= Jeremy Fikac =

American baseball player (born 1975)

- Pitcher
- Born: April 8, 1975 (age 51); Shiner, Texas, U.S.
- Batted: Right Threw: Right

MLB debut
- August 16, 2001, for the San Diego Padres

Last MLB appearance
- June 19, 2004, for the Montreal Expos

MLB statistics
- Win–loss record: 7–10
- Earned run average: 4.49
- Strikeouts: 116
- Stats at Baseball Reference

Teams
- Minor League; Idaho Falls Padres (1997–1998); Rancho Cucamonga Quakes (1998–2000); Mobile BayBears (2000–2001); Portland Beavers (2001); Sacramento Rivercats (2003); Edmonton Trappers (2004); Fresno Grizzlies (2005); Major League; San Diego Padres (2001–2002); Oakland Athletics (2003); Montreal Expos (2004)

Jeremy Joseph Fikac (born April 8, 1975) is an American former Major League Baseball relief pitcher who played for the San Diego Padres (2001–2002), Oakland Athletics (2003), and Montreal Expos (2004).

== Early life ==
Fikac was born on April 8, 1975 to Robert and Marian Fikac in Shiner, Texas.

Fikac played as a second baseman for the Shiner Comanches while a freshman at Shiner High School. He moved to Somerville High School for the 1990-1991 school year, where he played tennis, football, and baseball. He also played on the Somerville Yeguas basketball team, continuing there his junior year. He graduated from Somerville in 1993.

Following high school, he enrolled at Blinn Junior College. While a student there, he played for the Shiner Clippers community team. He attended Hill College in 1996, playing on their baseball team, scoring the winning run in the 14th Junior College State Baseball Tournament. In 1997, he pitched for Texas State University.

He graduated Texas State in May 2008 with a degree in Sports science.

== Career ==
He began playing in the minor leagues with the Idaho Falls Padres, then played two seasons for the Rancho Cucamonga Quakes, before opening the 2000-2001 season with the Mobile BayBears. He also played for the Portland Beavers in 2001. Fikac had been selected in the 19th round of the 1998 Major League Baseball draft by the San Diego Padres as a right-handed pitcher. On 12 August 2001, Fikac was promoted from the Southern League to play for the Padres.

He became the first San Diego pitcher to strikeout the first three batters of his Major League career, and the third Padres relief pitcher to win his debut game. He held the record for the longest strikeout streak in Padres history, having prevented anyone from scoring for 16.0 frames from August 16 to September 19, until Kevin Cameron surpassed his record in 2007. Hitters opposing the Padres while Fikac was on the pitch had a .165 batting average, though Fikac did also tie Willie Blair's record of the second-most home runs in a season allowed by a Major League relief pitcher.

The San Diego Madres, a support group for the Padres, named Fikac Player of the Month for October 2001 in recognition of the support he provided to the United States Navy after the September 11 attacks.

A cyst was discovered under Fikac's index finger during spring training in 2002, and he had scar tissue removed from his palm that year. Fikac also underwent ten weeks of rehab for his elbow while playing for the Padres. He was listed as injured for part of that season, with discussions in February of possibly replacing him with Steve Reed and having Fikac begin the season in the minor leagues. He was optioned to the BayBears for 11 days after a loss to the Baltimore Orioles on June 9.

The Athletics acquired his contract on January 2, 2003. No one from the opposing team scored during Fikac's first two innings in his debut for the team. Fikac was optioned to Sacramento on May 11. He was recalled from Sacramento on September 14. They did not renew his contract for 2004. He had an ERA of 4.50 in the 14 games he played in Oakland in 2003.

USA Baseball invited Fikac to try out for their roster for the 2004 Summer Olympics. He developed tendinitis in his right elbow during the tryouts, leading the Athletics to ask for him to be allowed to leave the qualifying team.

A free agent after the Athletics did not offer a 2004 contract, Fikac signed with the Montreal Expos. After the Expos won at Olympic Stadium on April 25, 2004, Fikac was optioned to Edmonton, from whom his contract had been purchased earlier in the year. Out of the 19 games he pitched, the April 25 game was Fikac's only game appearance in which the Expos won that season. The San Francisco Giants contracted him to play for their Triple-A affiliate in 2005. He also served as a relief pitcher for the Giants, winning their game against the Athletics on March 31, 2005.

In 2006, Fikac played for the Schulenburg Merchants, a team in the South Central Texas Amateur League. He also played for the CMC Steelers, who won the opening game of the 2006 National Baseball Congress World Series with Fikac pitching.

After seven years in MLB, he returned to his alma mater as a volunteer assistant coach in 2008, working as the hitting instructor. In 2012, after the departure of assistant coach Derek Matlock (hired at West Virginia University), Fikac was promoted to pitching coach.

Sam Houston State University placed Fikac on a short list of six potential new baseball coaches when David Pierce was hired by Tulane University.

In 2015, Fikac was named interim coach when Texas State announced that Ty Harrington would be going on temporary leave.

Fikac served as agent for Donnie Hart in 2019, and for Louis Head in 2021.

=== Charity golf ===
Fikac played in the 25th, 26th, and 27th Heartland Alliance-Maverick Engineering Bluebonnet Youth Ranch celebrity golf benefit tournaments. His team ranked second in 2006, fourth in 2007, and first in 2008.

== Sources ==
- "Around the Horn: National League – Padres 6, Mets 5". The Vindicator. Vol. 112, no. 351. August 17, 2001. p. C5 – via Google Books.
- "Clippers sweep doubleheader". The Victoria Advocate. Vol. 150, no. 8. May 15, 1995. p. 2B – via Google Books.
- "Dallimore is 10th-inning hero for SF". Marysville Appeal Democrat. Vol. 153, no. 250. April 2, 2005. p. B1 – via NewspaperArchive.com.
- "Expos sign third baseman Tony Batista". Saipan Tribune. Vol. 13. Associated Press. December 28, 2003. p. 26 – via Internet Archive.
- "Fikac joins Texas State baseball staff". US Fed News Service (Press release). February 7, 2008. ProQuest 469635106.
- "Jeremy Is One". Shiner Gazette. Vol. 84, no. 16. April 15, 1976. p. 8 – via NewspaperArchive.com.
- "Marlins Sign Benitez, and the Mariners Retain Garcia". The New York Times. December 21, 2003. p. SP8. Gale A111493895.
- Oakland Athletics 2004 Media Guide. Fresno: Dumont Printing. 2004 – via Internet Archive.
- "Owners show leeway in luxury tax". St Petersburg Times. June 12, 2002. p. 5C. Gale A87133026.
- "Scoreboard: Transactions – Baseball – American League". Ludington Daily News. Vol. 114, no. 33. Associated Press. December 22, 2003. p. B2 – via Google Books.
- "The Scoreboard: Transactions – Baseball – National League". Ellensburg Daily Record. Vol. 103, no. 81. April 5, 2004. p. 6 – via Google Books.
- "Scores and More: Transactions – Baseball – National League". The Union Democrat. Vol. 144, no. 242. June 12, 1998. p. 3C – via Google Books.
- "Sign-Up Sheet, Etc". The Victoria Advocate. Vol. 162, no. 230. December 30, 2007. p. C3 – via Google Books.
- "Sports Briefs". New Jersey Record. October 19, 2003. p. S04. Gale A109030543.
- "SWT ousts SHSU, faces UTSA in final". The Victoria Advocate. Vol. 152, no. 10. May 17, 1997. p. 3B – via Google Books.
- "Transactions: College". Yuma Sun. Vol. 118, no. 316. February 20, 2015. p. D3. ISSN 1538-0955 – via NewspaperArchive.com.
- "UPI NewsTrack Sports". United Press International. September 25, 2003. Gale A440299996.
- Beilue, Jon Mark (May 21, 1997). "River Road superintendent to enjoy 'once-in-a-lifetime deal' this weekend". Amarillo News Globe. Vol. 88, no. 171. pp. 1D, 5D – via NewspaperArchive.com.
- Bloomquist, Wes (July 13, 2008). "Schulenburg's Fikac handcuffs Rosebuds in SCTAL semifinal". The Victoria Advocate. Vol. 163, no. 57. p. C1 – via Google Books.
- Carmody, Kevin (May 13, 1996). "OC blows baseball lead against Hill at state". Odessa American. p. 1D – via NewspaperArchive.com.
- Dewan, John; Nistler, Tony, eds. (2002). The Scouting Notebook 2002. Morton Grove, IL: Stats Inc. Publishing. ISBN 1-884064-99-X – via Internet Archive.
- Ebner, Paul (August 14, 2001). "Fikac gets called up to San Diego". The Victoria Advocate. Vol. 156, no. 99. pp. B1–B2 – via Google Books.
- Ebner, Paul (October 13, 2008). "Fikac rides teams coattails to victory". The Victoria Advocate. Vol. 163, no. 148. p. C1 – via Google Books.
- Ebner, Paul (October 10, 2006). "McLish's team takes klean corp title". The Victoria Advocate. Vol. 161, no. 165. p. C1 – via Google Books.
- Ebner, Paul (October 8, 2007). "Opening Bluebonnet event finishes with packed leaderboard". The Victoria Advocate. Vol. 162, no. 148. p. C1 – via Google Books.
- Feeney, Darren; Nolan, J.P., eds. (March 24, 2020). San Diego Padres 2020 Media Guide. Phoenix: Prisma – via Internet Archive.
- Forman, Mike (July 2, 2008). "All-State Material: Shiner's Condel, other area players honored by Texas High School Baseball Coaches Association". The Victoria Advocate. Vol. 163, no. 49. pp. C1–C2 – via Google Books.
- Forman, Mike (August 18, 2006). "Golden opportunity: Weimar grad Janecka signs with UT-Pan American". The Victoria Advocate. Gale A149677898.
- Forman, Mike (May 27, 1990). "Shorthorns Edge Past Comanches". The Victoria Advocate. Vol. 145, no. 20. p. 5B – via Google Books.
- Froehlich, Leopold; Hodak, George (May 2002). "Baseball 2002". Playboy. pp. 108–110, 147–156.
- Ham, Charlie (November 21, 1991). "Somerville Basketball – Looking For Experience". Caldwell Burleson County Citizen Tribune. Vol. 107, no. 11. p. 6 – via NewspaperArchive.com.
- Henninger, Thom; Nistler, Tony; Zminda, Don, eds. (2005). The Scounting Notebook 2005. Sporting News Books. ISBN 978-0-89204-768-0 – via Internet Archive.
- Hoornstra, J.P. (March 10, 2019). "New Dodger pitcher Donnie Hart was helped by a fortuitous sidestep". Los Angeles Daily News. ProQuest 2189418723.
- Hulet, Marc (March 11, 2002). "National League West set for race". Spoke. Vol. 34, no. 9. Conestoga College. p. 8 – via Internet Archive.
- Hurd, Rick (April 2, 2003). "Tejada, A's are no mere distractions, blast the Mariners". Contra Costa Times. p. K1926. Gale A99544518.
- Hyde, Connor (June 16, 2014). "Search for new baseball coach underway". The Houstonian. ProQuest 1535819018.
- Johnson, Tresa (April 4, 1991). "Yeuas back with strong racket attack". The Yegua Beat. Vol. 1, no. 1. p. 1 – via NewspaperArchive.com.
- Kepner, Tyler (August 17, 2001). "An Unlikely Home Run Sinks the Mets". The New York Times. p. D2. Gale A77272647.
- Krasovic, Tom (January 28, 2002). "N.L. (Baseball) – San Diego Padres". The Sporting News. Vol. 226, no. 4. pp. 58–60. Gale A82885064.
- Krasovic, Tom (February 18, 2002). "N.L. (Spring Training Baseball) – San Diego Padres". The Sporting News. Vol. 226, no. 7. Gale A83144022.
- Lexa, Jim (April 7, 1997). "Fikac lets bat do talking at collegiate level". Amarillo Daily News. Vol. 88, no. 133. p. 5D – via NewspaperArchive.com.
- Miedema, Laurence (January 2, 2003). "A's acquire Fikac". The Mercury News. Tribune Content Agency. p. K2774. Gale A96476644.
- Miller, Warren; Tobin, Leah; Picciolo, Bret; Coughlan, Ben, eds. (2008). San Diego Padres 2008 Media Guide. Tempe, AZ: Ben Franklin Press – via Internet Archive.
- Orts, Jason (August 2, 2006). "Fikac leads Steelers to World Series win". Seguin Gazette-Enterprise. Vol. 117, no. 227. p. 5 – via NewspaperArchive.com.
- Roebuck, Matt; Sewell, Marty; Perrina de Diego, Christina; McKinsey, Meghan; Whelan, Robert; Alvarez, Jon Erik; Blaco, Christina; Munoz, Emmanuel; Armella, Maria (February 28, 2011). Florida Marlins 2011 Media Guide. Miami: Florida Marlins – via Internet Archive.
- Sickels, John (2002). STATS Minor League Scouting Notebook 2002. Morton Grove, IL: Stats Inc. Publishing. ISBN 1-931584-00-1 – via Internet Archive.
- Slavik, Coy (September 4, 2002). "Trip to Mobile was right move to bolster Fikac's confidence". The Victoria Advocate. Vol. 157, no. 120. p. 1B-2B – via Google Books.
- Slusser, Susan (January 20, 2003). "A.L. reports. (Insider: baseball) – Oakland Athletics". The Sporting News. Vol. 227, no. 3. pp. 52–53. Gale A96555210.
- Stuart, Jeffrey (2008). Blue Mondays: The Long Goodbye of the Montreal Expos. Baltimore: PublishAmerica. ISBN 1-60474-295-X – via Internet Archive.
- Topkin, Marc (April 24, 2021). "A Jim Morris sequel? Not quite. But Louis Head is a good story, too". Tampa Bay Times. ProQuest 2517763493.
- Turner, Pat (June 20, 2014). "Growing problem: Season–ending injury increasingly common". New Braunfels Herald-Zeitung. p. 7A – via NewspaperArchive.com.
- Zuckerman, Mark (June 12, 2002). "Batista's homer in 10th bails out Orioles' relievers against Padres". The Washington Times. p. C05. Gale A87104402.
