= Lynching of Irving and Herman Arthur =

1920 crime in Paris, Texas, United States

- Part of Jim Crow era
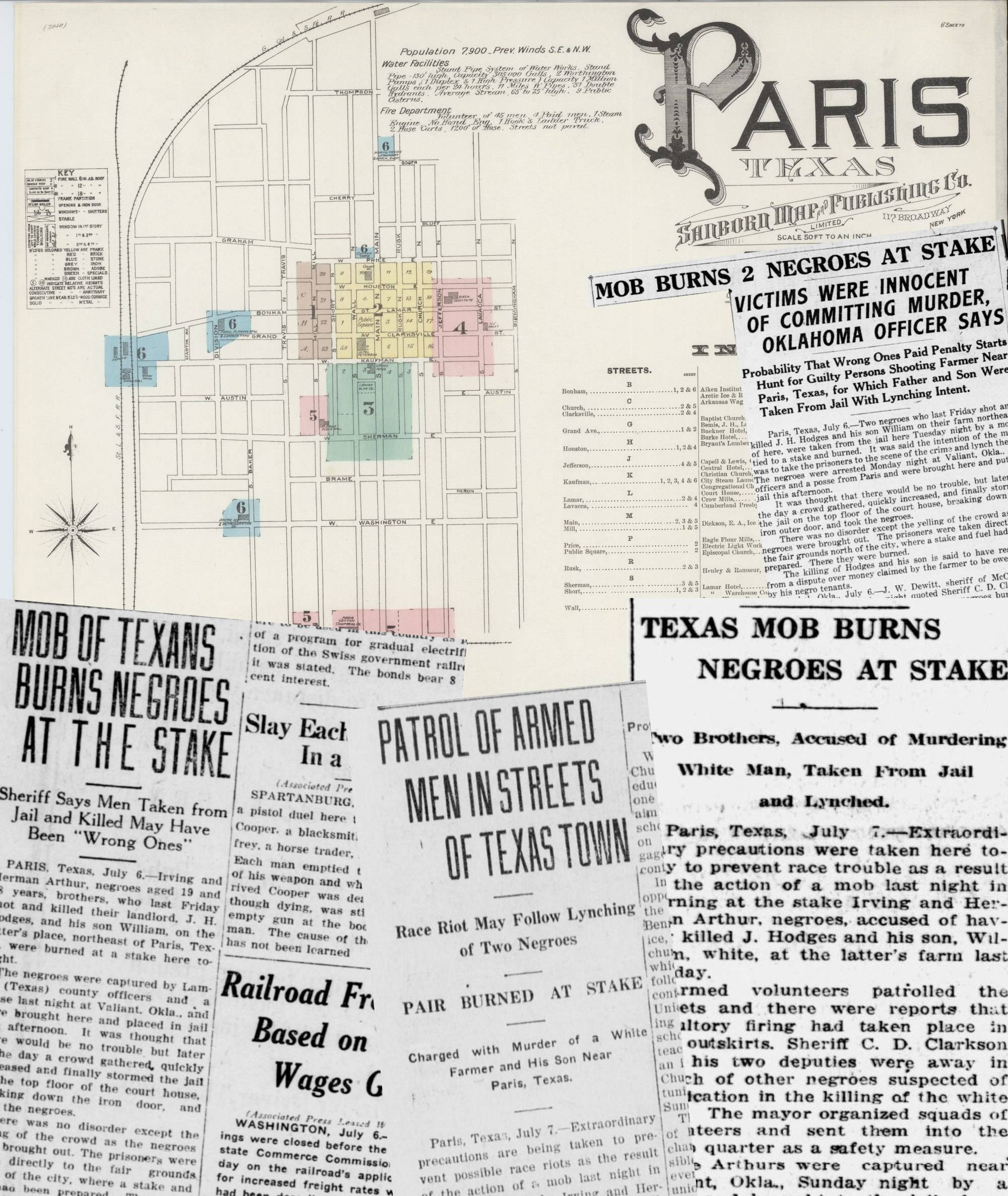
- July 7, 1920, coverage of the lynchings
- Date: July 6, 1920
- Location: Paris, Texas
- Participants: White mob from Paris, Texas
- Deaths: 2

African Americans Irving "Ervie" Arthur (1903–1920) and his brother Herman Arthur (1892–1920), a World War I veteran, were lynched—burned alive—at the Lamar County Fairgrounds in Paris, Texas, on July 6, 1920. The event extended and amplified regional and national flashpoints for justice. It happened just a year after the racial violence of 1919's Red Summer. The family was attacked by some of the town's white population and were forced to flee to the north, mostly settling in Chicago. This and other attacks on Black Americans encouraged civil rights groups to fight against lynchings in the United States. Media outlets reported on the 100-year-old anniversary but the memorial events were scaled down due to the COVID-19 pandemic.

== Background ==
The Arthur brothers (né Charles)—stepsons of Scott Arthur, a sharecropper tenant of the Hodges' farm—were accused of fatally shooting, on July 2, 1920, the landlord, John Henry Hodges (1859–1920) and his son, William M. Hodges (1886–1920), during a dispute. William Hodges' death certificate indicates that he died of both a knife and gunshot wound. The prevailing story was that the Arthurs refused Hodges' demand to work beyond noon Saturdays and full-Sundays—to pay a debt.

This account was chronicled in a letter from a Paris citizen, who requested anonymity, to James Weldon Johnson, Acting Secretary of the NAACP, who, in turn, forwarded it for publishing in newspapers that included the New York Age and Negro World. The letter explained that, (paraphrasing) against the usual custom in Paris, Hodges compelled the Arthurs to work all day Saturday, which they did for a period; and, on Sundays, they washed and ironed their clothes. Sometime during the summer of 1920, the Arthurs refused to work past noon Saturdays and all-day Sunday. As a result John Hodges and his son, Will, went to their home on June 29, 1920, and took their dinner off the stove and threw it into the yard, then kicked their stove and furniture into the yard. During this time, Will Hodges held a gun on the Arthurs. He also compelled the boys to pull off their shoes and clothes and their sisters to pull off their dresses and give them to him, claiming that they were in debt to him. When the Arthurs attempted to move from the farm, permanently, three days later, the Hodges appeared again. This time, they fired a gun towards the family as they were packing a borrowed truck. One of the Arthur sons slipped into the house, retrieved a gun, and returned fire, killing John and Will Hodges.

With a tip from "Pitt" McGrew (née James McGrew; 1875–1943), Herman and Ervie Arthur were arrested the morning of July 6, 1920, in Valliant, Oklahoma, by McCurtain County Deputy Sheriff Weaver and the City Marshall of Valliant, who brought them to Hugo, and at about noon, placed them in the Choctaw County Jail. At about 1:45 pm, the captors left with their prisoners for the Lamar County jail in Paris. When they reached the Red River, about fifteen automobiles were waiting at the south bank, but no one attempted to take the prisoners. They reached their destination at 3 pm. McGrew, who was African American, has been chronicled as notorious and disliked by the African American community.

Notice of Herman and Ervie Arthur's impending lynching was openly advertised, to wit: "Niggers caught. Black brutes who killed Hodges will be burned in the fair grounds. Be on hand." Shortly after their arrival, several hundred men approached the jail with a pinch bar and the leaders battered the outer door. The jailer and two guards, all heavily armed, were inside the jail. After some "parlaying," the jailer proposed that if twelve of the mob came forward as a committee, he would surrender the keys. At 7:30 pm, July 6, 1920, twelve men took Herman and Ervie Arthur from the jail and dragged them out to North Main, to the fairgrounds. At 8:00 pm, the Arthur brothers were burned alive at the fairground in Paris while a mob of 3,000 watched.

According to the NAACP letter, members of the mob dragged the charred remains behind an automobile for hours through the streets of an African-American neighborhood—up West Sherman Street and down 7th Street SW, between Sherman and Washington Streets, past Will Hodges' residence—while screaming, "Here are the barbecued Niggers, all you Niggers come out and see them and take warning". One witness remembered it as a "regular parade of seventeen cars and a truck, all filled with armed men". According to the Dallas Morning News of July 8, 1920, Pine Bluff Street was "the general dividing line between the two sections."

Meanwhile, the three sisters—ages 14, 17, and 20—were being held at the Lamar County jail under the pretense of "protection". While the Arthur brothers' remains were being dragged through Paris, the sisters were severely beaten ... taken to the basement, stripped of all their clothing, and then reportedly raped by 20 white men. After being raped, they were given bacon, molasses, and a sack of flour and told to leave the building.

None of the mob members were masked, but, according to a claim by some newspapers, none could be identified due to the darkness.

As was reported by the McCurtain Gazette, July 10, 1920, Ernest Christian Steen (1892–1960), office deputy for Choctow County, and Sheriff Ben Fitzgerald (né Robert Benjamin Fitgerald; 1886–1967) were present when the Arthurs were burned to death. He said he was within 50 feet (15 m) of the pyre and would never again witness such a scene, saying it was too terrible.

With respect to the assaults on the three sisters, in 2018, historian Hollie A. Teague wrote, "It is difficult to imagine a scenario in which some of those twenty White men were not jailers, police officers, or sheriff deputies. Indeed, it is impossible to imagine a scenario in which those officials would not at least be aware of the prolonged assault taking place or who was participating in it. Yet, not only was the assault allowed to continue, no arrests were made [immediately] afterward. This stands in stark contrast to the reaction that followed attacks on white women or children".

The next day, July 7, 1920, McCurtain County Sheriff John William DeWitt (1872–1933) of Valliant told the news media that Lamar County Sheriff William Everett "Eb" Clarkson (1875–1945) had confided in him—while in Idabel the night before searching for those whom he thought were the actual killers—that he was sure that one, if not both, of the lynched Arthur brothers would have been found innocent. Clarkson insisted that one of the lynched victims was not the murderer and that the other could not be identified. There was also a claim that the Arthur brothers likely acted in self-defense following two armed provocations, both by William Hodges (accompanied by his father), who allegedly, during the second incident, fired the first gunshots. Herman Arthur, a World War I veteran, (Note: Many African Americans served during WWI in segregated units (see also Military history of African Americans – World War I)) was reportedly a skilled marksman.

== Ensuing protests, disciplinary actions, and criminal proceedings ==
The NAACP sent a telegram to Acting Governor Willard Arnold Johnson (1862–1923) on July 8, 1920, protesting the lynching and urged the Governor to take immediate action to apprehend and punish members of the mob.

A policeman identified as being part of the mob was dismissed from the Paris Police Department.

In Paris, Sixth Judicial District Court Judge Ben H. Denton (né Benjamin Harrison Denton; 1854–1940) ordered a special grand jury to investigate the burning of the Arthur brothers. On July 26, 1920, the jury returned five bills of indictment, all for first degree murder. Those indicted were:

Wilbur Carter Clough (1896–1974)
Charles William Luckey (1876–1959), granted bond
Thomas Lempe Dobbs (1869–1939), jailed on default of bail
Ernest Lee Coggins (1889–1950)
Thomas Brooks Holderness (1869–1952)

On October 30, 1920, Judge Denton ordered the cases of the five defendants to be transferred to Fifty-Ninth District Court at Sherman, under Judge Silas Hare (1862—1931), son of late State Representative Silas Hare (1827–1908). All were acquitted.

In the case of the State v. Tom Dobbs, Judge Hare, on January 14, 1922, instructed a jury to acquit Dobbs on the grounds that the State failed to connect the defendant to the crime.

In the case of the State v. Ernest Coggins, the case was "passed" January 11, 1922, when called by the Fifty-Ninth District Court in Sherman—Judge Frank Edward Wilcox (1865–1938), presiding—due to defense counsel's claim that Coggins was ill at home in Paris. "Passed" meant that the case was called and nothing happened. A passed case is not a dismissal. Rather, it leaves the court an option to schedule a court hearing, later. Coggins was a World War I veteran—a U.S. Navy enlistee—and a fireman for Paris.

"After the bodies had been burned to a crisp" [sic], Wilbur Clough, dressed in khakis, identified himself as being in charge of the U.S. Government Recruiting Office in Paris and climbed halfway up a telephone pole near the one to which the Arthurs had been bound and announced, "We have done what we came here to do. The negroes have been burned to death and we can go to our homes."

== Scott and Violet Arthur family photo ==
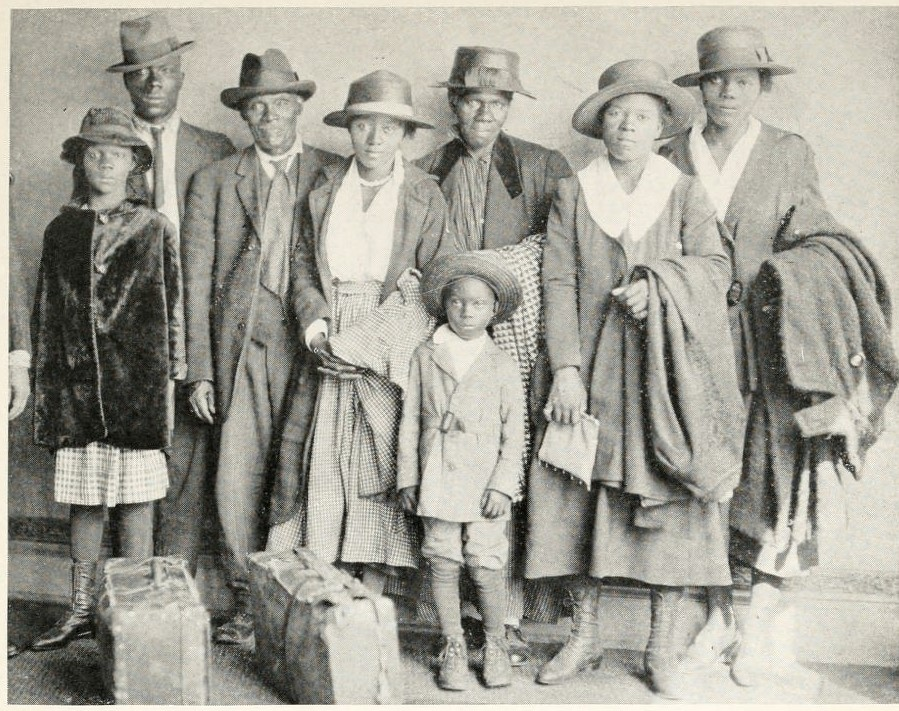
Chicago Defender, September 4, 1920 Photo by William E. Woodard (1889–1961) Scott and Violet Arthur family, after leaving Paris Child standing, front center: Ervin Hill (1914–1989) – grandson (wearing knickers) Seven standing behind child, left to right: (i) Millie Arthur (1907–1975) – daughter; (ii) Andrew Arthur; (iii) Scott Arthur (1836–1937) – father; (iv) Millie Arthur (1907–1975) – daughter; (v) Violet Arthur (née Charles; 1860–1951) – mother; (vi) Eula Arthur (1902–1976) – daughter; (vii) Mary Lee Arthur (1905–1977) – daughter.

The family photo was arranged by the Chicago Defender, who originally published it September 4, 1920, with the following caption:

Facing starvation, Scott Arthur and his family, driven from home like dogs, girls assaulted, sons burned at the stake by Paris, TX mob, arrive in Chicago without money and homeless! They were taken in charge by Dr. W. W. Lucas, secretary of the Co-Operative Society of America, who discovered them in the Polk Street Station Monday.

Rev. Dr. Lucas (né William W. Lucas; 1865–1926) posed with the family in the photo, but was cropped out (see his arm at the far left). The photo has endured for one hundred and five years—having been published in government reports, history books, and online; but the Arthur family has rarely been identified.

== Red Summer of 1919 ==
The year before the lynching of Irving and Herman Arthur saw several incidents of civil unrest that spiked during the so-called American Red Summer of 1919, with terrorist attacks on black communities and white oppression in over three dozen cities and counties. In most cases, white mobs attacked African American neighborhoods. In some cases, black community groups resisted the attacks, especially in Chicago and Washington, D.C. Most deaths occurred in rural areas during events like the Elaine massacre in Arkansas, where an estimated 100 to 240 black people and five white people were killed. Also in 1919 were the Chicago Race Riot and Washington D.C. race riot which killed 38 and 39 people respectively, and with both having many more non-fatal injuries and extensive property damage reaching up into the millions of dollars.

== 100-year remembrance ==
On July 7, 2020, a group of about 20—which included descendants of Scott Arthur (1836–1937) and Violet Arthur (née Charles; 1860–1951), parents of the Arthur brothers, and descendants of the Hodges—while donning face masks and maintaining social distancing for protection against COVID-19, met for the first time in a remembrance ceremony at the Red River Valley Veterans Memorial in Paris.

On the Arthur family side, attendees included Janese Walton-Roberts, 47, grandniece of Herman and Ervie Arthur, and great–granddaughter of Scott and Violet Arthur—by way of Mary Lee Arthur (1905–1977) (her grandmother and one of Herman and Arvie's seven sisters) and Mary Lue Sims (1932–2001) (her mother) (nephew and nieces of Herman and Ervie Arthur). On the Hodges family side, attendees included Melinda Watters, great-granddaughter of Vinckley Meadows Hodges (1881–1948), one of John H. Hodges' five children. The Remembrance was the idea of Watters. The 2020 COVID crisis kept away most Paris residents due to fears of the disease and social distancing restrictions.

Although Walton-Roberts grew up in Chicago she now lives in Killeen, Texas. She was reported as saying, "If anything comes out of this, then it was worth it to go back". Walton-Roberts didn't know of any descendants of the Hodges family until she stumbled across a letter written by a Hodges descendant who apologized for her family's role in the lynching. Walton-Roberts noted, "The city never offered any type of apology ... I appreciate it because her letter was something that needed to happen."

According to the Chicago Tribune, as of 2020 there are three living grandchildren of Scott and Violet Arthur—by way of their mother, Mary Lee Arthur: Rufus Arthur Sims, 86, of Chicago's West Side; Dorothy Williams, 93, of Country Club Hills, a Chicago suburb, and Annie Violet Sims, 84, of Atlanta. None of the three were able to attend. But Rufus, reflecting on the 100-year remembrance, expressed to the Chicago Tribune that the story harbored over the years by his family has been particularly painful. Rufus, though, was pleased that it was being told—the remembrance was momentous. "It was a beautiful thing to bring everything out, especially with the way things are going [in America] at this particular time", said Rufus. "My uncles were burned up, burned alive in a field because they fought back. A lot of people lost their lives for fighting back. It's important for the younger generation to understand that".

Paris has been the site of 12 documented lynchings since 1892. The Arthur brothers were the last.

== National memorial ==
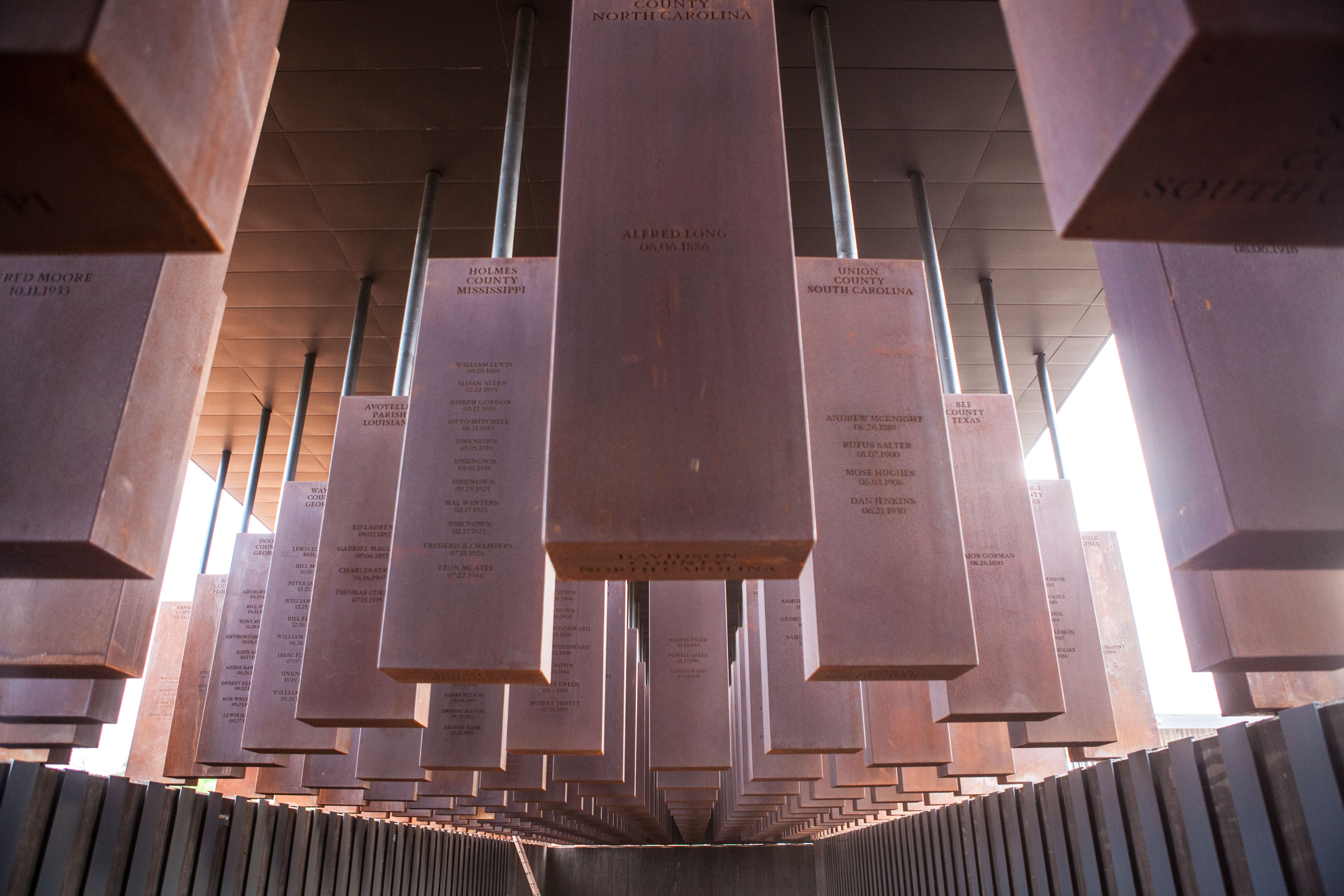
Memorial Corridor, National Memorial for Peace and Justice

The National Memorial for Peace and Justice opened in Montgomery, Alabama, on April 26, 2018, in a setting of 6 acres (2.4 ha). Featured among other things, is a sculpture by Kwame Akoto-Bamfo of a mother with a chain around her neck and an infant in her arms. On a hill overlooking the sculpture is the Memorial Corridor which displays 805 hanging steel rectangles, each representing the counties in the United States where a documented lynching took place and, for each county, the names of those lynched. For Lamar County, Irving and Herman Arthur are memorialized as lynching victims.

== Herman Arthur's service in the U.S. Armed Forces ==
During World War I, Herman Arthur enlisted in the U.S. Army. He was inducted April 29, 1918, at Mount Pleasant, Texas, and trained for a little over a month with the 11^{th} Company, 3^{rd} Battalion, 165^{th} Depot Brigade at Camp Travis—a World War I training camp in San Antonio that existed from 1917 to 1924, then was absorbed by Fort Sam Houston. (see Camp Travis photos at Wikimedia Commons) On July 14, 1918, Arthur was transferred to the Army Corps of Engineers and attached to Company A (about 224 men), 537^{th} Engineers Service Battalion an all-African American unit that mobilized at Camp Travis. The 537^{th} was one of 53 Engineers Service Battalions (Nos. 505 thru 567, with some gaps) composed entirely of African Americans. Each Battalion had about 1008 men.

On July 15, the 537^{th} Engineers Service Battalion—(i) Field and Staff, (ii) Headquarters Detachment, (iii) Medical Detachment, and (iv) Companies A thru D; 878 total personnel—departed from the Army's Hoboken Port of Embarkation aboard the USS Great Northern to Brest, France, to serve on the Western Front of the European theatre as part of the American Expeditionary Forces. The Battalion's mission was: "Service of supply, general construction to September 17, 1918; then 1^{st} Army on road and miscellaneous duties."

Although the Armistice of November 11, 1918, took effect at 11 am, Company A and the entire 537^{th} remained in Europe. On June 28, 1919, Company A, with Private Arthur, departed Brest, France, aboard the USS Mount Vernon and arrived in the Hoboken Port of Embarkation, July 5, 1919—a year and one day before being burned alive with his younger brother. Private Arthur was honorably discharged July 14, 1919, at Camp Mills—following the July 1919 demobilization of the 537^{th}. Capt. Willis Dhu Aine Peaslee (1887–1960), an electrical engineer and graduate of Stanford, was the Commander of Company A.

== See also ==
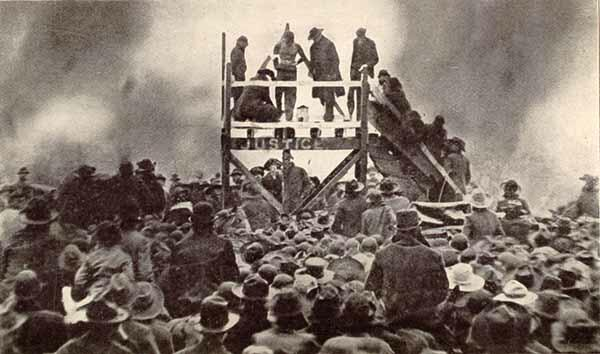
Photo of public lynching of Henry Smith in Paris, Texas in 1893

- Lynching of Henry Smith, Paris, Texas (February 1, 1893)
- Longview race riot, Texas (July 10–12, 1919)
- Port Arthur Race Riot, Texas (July 15, 1919)
- Lynching of Chilton Jennings in Gilmer, Texas (July 24, 1919)
- Texarkana, Texas, race riot of 1919 (August 6, 1919)
- African-American veterans lynched after World War I
- Anti-lynching movement
- Hate crime laws in the United States
- Jessie Daniel Ames (1883–1972), Texas anti-lynching activist
- Extrajudicial and retribution killing

== Bibliography ==
=== References ===
News media

- "Case Against Texan Man for Burning Negro Passed". The Austin American. Vol. 8, no. 219. Austin: American Publishing Company. January 14, 1922. p. 1, col. 7 (of 8). ISSN 2473-5434. OCLC 15153583 – via Newspapers.com.
- "Paris Citizens Say Never Again – Over 300 Sign Up to Lead War Against Lynching of Negros". Beaumont Enterprise. Vol. 23, no. 23. Beaumont. January 14, 1922. p. 3. ISSN 2333-4800. OCLC 869385895 – via GenealogyBank.com.
- "Patrol of Armed Men In Streets Of Texas Town". Bennington Evening Banner. Bennington, Vermont: Frank E. Howe (ed.). July 7, 1920. pp. 1–6. ISSN 2331-7884. OCLC 32328856 – via Chronicling America.
- "Mob of Texans Burns Negroes". Bisbee Daily Review. Bisbee, Arizona: W.B. Kelly. July 7, 1920. pp. 1–8. ISSN 2157-3255. OCLC 11363144 – via Chronicling America.
- Bills, E. R. (né Eddie Ray Bills II) (July 5, 2016). "The Worst Lynching in Texas History". Dissident Voice. dissidentvoice.org; Santa Rosa, California.
- Byrd, Klark (July 7, 2020). "Arthur Family Remembrance". The Paris News. Paris, Texas. OCLC 14201756.
- Chicago Defender (The) (September 4, 1920). "Eight Victims of Lynch Law". Vol. 15, no. 26. photo by William E. Woodard (1889–1961), Defender staff photographer. Chicago: Robert S. Abbott. p. 1. ISSN 0745-7014.
1. Via Newspapers.com.
Photo caption: "Facing starvation, Scott Arthur and his family, driven from home like dogs, girls assaulted, sons burned at the stake by Paris, Texas, mob, arrive in Chicago without money and homeless!"
- "Protest Filed Against Lynching of Two Negros". The Colorado Springs Gazette. Vol. 46, no. 15, 732. July 8, 1920. p. 2 (col 3, bottom). ISSN 1531-2607. OCLC 43768598 – via GenealogyBank.com.
- "Suspect in Paris Lynching Ordered Acquitted by Jury". The Courier-Gazette. Rockland, Me: Porter & Fuller. January 14, 1922. OCLC 9352226.
- "No More Trouble Expected at Paris". Dallas Morning News. Vol. 35, no. 283. July 8, 1920. p. 1, col 3). OCLC 25174115 – via GenealogyBank.com.
- "Man Acquitted of Murder". Fort Worth Star-Telegram. January 14, 1922. ISSN 0889-0013. OCLC 60616134.
- Glanton, Dahleen (July 13, 2020). "After 100 years, Paris, Texas, Confronts Lynching That Sent a Family to Chicago". Chicago Tribune. ISSN 1085-6706. OCLC 60639020. Archived from the original on July 13, 2020.
- Glanton, Dahleen (February 12, 1998). "Running North: A Family History". Tempo – Chicago Tribune. ISSN 2165-171X. OCLC 60639020.
- The Grand Rapids Press (April 6, 1976). "Obituary" – "Griffin – Mrs. Eula Griffin". p. 2 (section C; columns 5 [bottom] & 6 [top]). LCCN sn83-16673, LCCN 2020-221313; ISSN 2574-8378 (print), ISSN 2691-9419; OCLC 9975013 (all editions).
1. Via GenealogyBank.com (digital image 32 of 55).
2. Via Newspapers.com (digital image 32 of 55).
- "Captain Peaslee in France With U.S. Forces". Morning Union. Grass Valley and Nevada City, California. July 14, 1918. p. 2 (col. 2, top) – via Newspapers.com. (OCLC 28146135; LCCN sn93053278)
- "Mob Burns 2 Negroes at Stake". The Tribune. Great Falls, Montana. July 7, 1920. pp. 1–12. ISSN 2378-833X. OCLC 11299783 – via Chronicling America.
- Henderson, Nia-Malika (April 26, 2018). "This New Lynching Memorial Rewrites American History". CNN.
- "Paris Burn Fest Most Horrible Atrocity in Annals of Texas Lynchings in Texas: Leading Citizens Were There". Houston Informer. Houston, Texas: Clifton Frederick Richardson, Sr. (1892–1939) (publisher and editor). July 26, 1920. OCLC 10549554.
- Jarrett, Vernon (February 10, 1980). "Remembering Black Chicago – An Old Photo Comes to Life". Chicago Tribune. ISSN 2165-171X. OCLC 60639020.
- "Two Lynched Not Guilty? – After Their Death, Sheriff Declares Mistake Had Been Made and Starts on Trail of Another Pair for Farmers' Murder – Vol. 83, No. 162". Kansas City Times. Kansas City, Missouri: William Rockhill Nelson. July 7, 1920. OCLC 8322727.
- Madewell, Mary (July 7, 2020). "Remembrance Ceremony: Descendants of Families Linked to 100-Year-Old Lynching Met for First Time". The Paris News. Paris, Texas. OCLC 14201756.
- "Two Negroes Burned To Death At Paris, Texas". McCurtain Gazette. Vol. 14, no. 41. Idabel, Indian Territory, Choctaw Nation: DeWitt & Henderson. July 10, 1920. pp. 1–8. OCLC 12110732.
- "Christian America Is There Any Justice Within Your Power? – How Long Will You Burn Human Beings at the Stake? – What Will Be Your End?". The Negro Star. Vol. 8, no. 12. Wichita, Kansas: (editor & publisher: Hollie Turner Sims; 1884–1953). July 16, 1920. p. 1. ISSN 2642-7621. OCLC 664611331 – via Newspapers.com.
- "Texas Mob Burns Negroes At Stake". New Britain Herald. New Britain, Connecticut: Herald Pub. Co. July 7, 1920. pp. 1–12. ISSN 2643-4954. OCLC 8783515 – via Chronicling America.
- New York Age (September 4, 1920). "How Arthur Boys Were Lynched and Three Young Sisters Raped" — "Hitherto Unpublished Facts About Mob Outrage at Paris, Texas, July 6" — "Officer of the Law Assaults Innocent Girls". Vol. 33, no. 50. New York. p. 1 – via Fultonhistory.com. LCCN sn83-30005; ISSN 2998-1379; OCLC 9274417 (all editions).
1. Via Fultonhistory.com (PDF) (see Fultonhistory.com).
- "Patrols Guard Paris, Texas". New York Evening Mail. New York City, NY, U.S.: Edward Rumely. July 7, 1920. OCLC 9368496.
- "Texans Seek to Punish Mob for Stake Burning". New York Evening Mail. New York City, NY, U.S.: Edward Rumely. July 10, 1920. OCLC 9368496.
- New York Times (The). LCCN sn00-61556; ISSN 0362-4331, ISSN 1553-8095 (online); OCLC 1645522 (all editions).
1. "For Action on Race Riot Peril; Radical Propaganda Among Negroes Growing, and Increase of Mob Violence Set Out in Senate Brief for Federal Inquiry" — "The War's Responsibility". "Reds Inflaming Blacks". "Industrial Clashes" — I. "The Facts – 1919". II. "The Failure of the States". III. "A National Problem". IV. "Consequences of Lynching". V. "The Danger". Vol. 69, no. 22534. October 5, 1919. p. 10 (section 10). Retrieved October 15, 2020.
  1. Via NYTimes blog.
  2. Via TimesMachine (digital image 112 of 142).
  3. Pdf via TimesMachine (PDF).
  4. Permalink via TimesMachine.
  5. Via Newspapers.com.
  6. ProQuest 100359007
- "Scouring the Country in Search for Two Negros Who Murdered Farmer and Son". Paris Morning News. Vol. 51, no. 304. North Texas Publishing Company. July 3, 1920. p. front page (top right). OCLC 14201756 – via Newspapers.com.
- Steely, Skipper (pseud. of Thomas Brazelton Steely; born 1946) (September 1, 1997). "Pain Still Haunts After Healing of Time". The Paris News. Paris, Texas. OCLC 14201756.
- "Two Negros Burned at Paris". Soper Democrat. Soper, Oklahoma, California. July 14, 1918. pp. 1 & 4. OCLC 35147419 – via Newspapers.com.
- Timmons, Patrick (January 13, 2006). "My Ancestors' Violence" (PDF). The Texas Observer. Vol. 98, no. 1. Austin: Texas Democracy Foundation. pp. 8–9, 19. ISSN 0040-4519. OCLC 61313286.
- McCoy, Cory (February 26, 2020). "Gohmert Votes Against Making Lynching a Federal Hate Crime, Citing Preference for Death Penalty". Tyler Morning Telegraph. Tyler, Texas.

Books, journals, magazines, and papers

- Chapman, David Lynn (born 1948) (August 1973). Lynching in Texas (PDF) (M.A. thesis). Texas Tech University. OCLC 466141758. OCLC 797961552 (all editions).
- Ginzburg, Ralph (1988) [1962]. "Letter From Texas Reveals Lynching's Ironic Facts". 100 Years of Lynchings (270 pps.). Baltimore: Black Classic Press. LCCN 61-15821, LCCN 90-167936; ISBN 978-0-9331-2118-8OCLC 5294697 (all editions).
1. Via Internet Archive.
2. Via Google Books (limited preview).
- Teague, Hollie A. (Publications by Hollie Teague at ResearchGate) (July 5, 2018). Teague, Hollie A. (2018). "Black and Blue in North Texas: The Long Neglected History of Anti-Black Police Violence in North Texas, 1880–1930". Journal of Black Studies. 49 (8). SAGE Publications: 756–781. doi:10.1177/0021934718785631. ISSN 1552-4566. LCCN 77022565. OCLC 1799971. S2CID 149506941.
- Annual Report of the Chief of Engineers United States Army. Vol. Part 1 of 3. U.S. War Department, Office of the Chief of Engineers, Document 941. September 30, 1919. p. 41.
- Best, Wallace DeNino (2007). Passionately Human, No Less Divine: Religion and Culture in Black Chicago, 1915–1952. Princeton University Press. ISBN 9780691133751.

Government and genealogical archives

- "Veterans Administration Master Index, 1917–1940". FamilySearch (free database with images). Searching: "Ernest Lee Coggins," August 24, 1918; citing Military Service, NARA microfilm publication 761939 (St. Louis: National Archives and Records Administration, 1985); Affiliate Film No. 41A; Digital Folder No. 105157995; Image No. 06489.
- "Texas Deaths, 1890–1976". FamilySearch (database with images). Texas State Board of Health, Department of Vital Statistics, Standard Certificate of Death (Form D), Registered No. 149, No. 655, re: "Wm. Hodges," date of death: July 2, 1920, Paris, Lamar County, Texas; citing certificate number 23360, Texas – Bureau of Vital Statistics, Office of the State Registrar, Austin; FHL Digital Folder No. 005164757, Image No. 00671.
- "Texas, World War I Records, 1917–1920". FamilySearch (free database with images). Searching: "Herman Arther" (sic), April 29, 1918; citing Military Service, Mount Pleasant, Texas, Texas Military Forces Museum, Austin. OCLC 946607820.
- "United States Census, 1900". FamilySearch (free database with images). Searching "Scott Arthur, Justice Precinct 1 (excluding Pittsburg town), Camp County, citing enumeration district 13, Sheet 29A, Family 539, NARA microfilm publication T623 (Washington, D.C., 1972). FHL microfilm 1241618; Digital Folder No. 4112122; Image No. 61; Indexing Project (Batch) No. N00743-0; Record No. 2846.
- "United States Census, 1910". FamilySearch (free database with images). Searching "Harmon Arthur in household of Scott Arthur," Justice Precinct 1, Titus, Texas, citing enumeration district 133, Sheet 1A, Family 6, NARA microfilm publication T624 (Washington, D.C., 1982). FHL microfilm 1375607; Digital Folder No. 5157480; Image No. 56; Indexing Project (Batch) No. N03566-2; Record No. 2430.
- "Lists of Incoming Passengers, 1917–1938". (searching: "Herman Arthur") (textual records, 360 Boxes. National Archives Index "NAI:" 6234465). Records of the Office of the Quartermaster General, 1774–1985, Record Group 92. National Archives at College Park. Lists of Outgoing Passengers, 1917–1938. Textual records. 255 Boxes. NAI: 6234477. Records of the Office of the Quartermaster General, 1774–1985, Record Group 92. National Archives at College Park. (accessible via Ancestry.com, Army Transport Service, Passenger Lists, 1910–1939 [online]. Lehi, Utah).
