= Baytown Sun =

Newspaper published in Baytown, Texas

The Baytown Sun

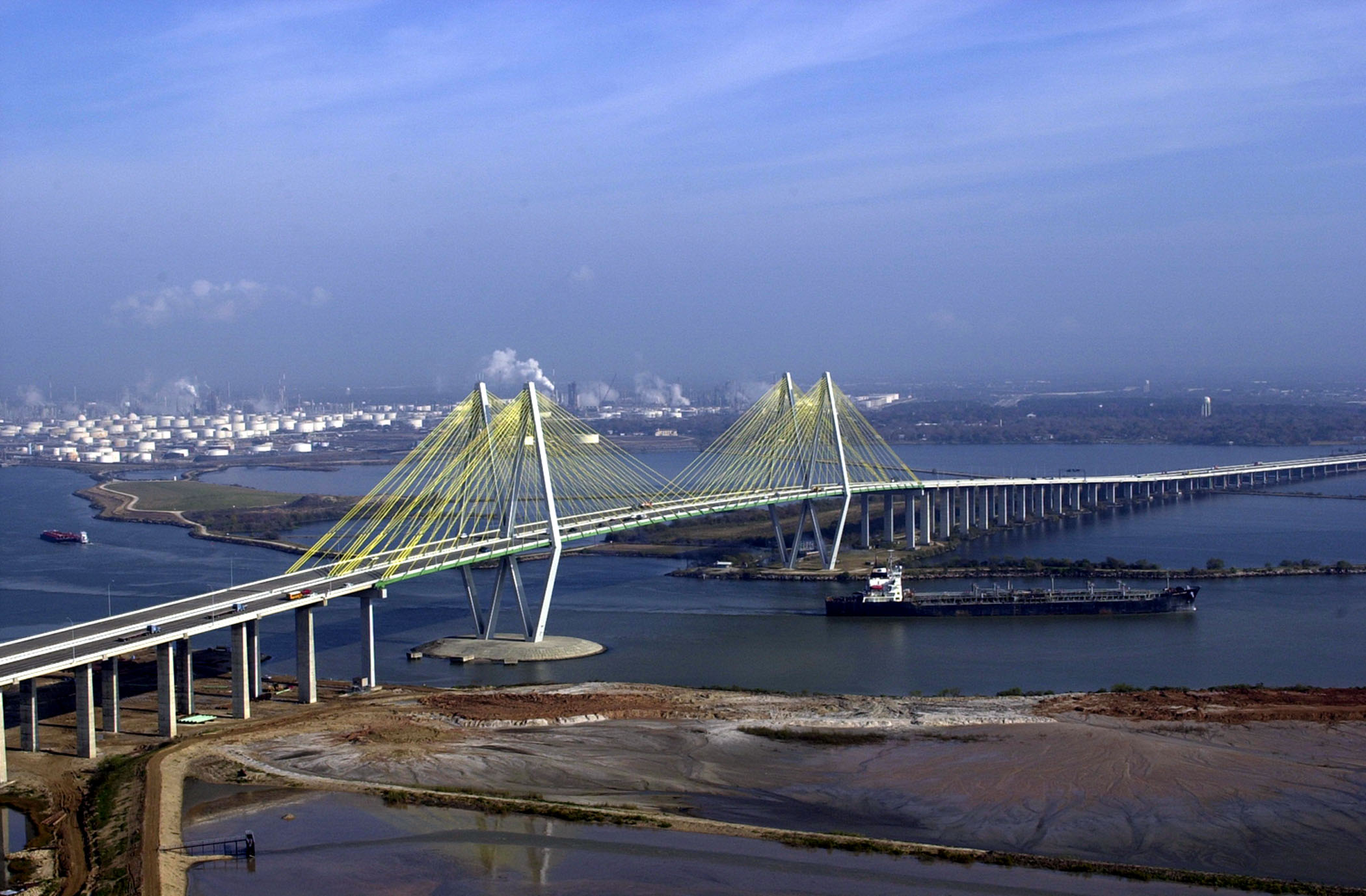
- The Fred Hartman Bridge, named after longtime Baytown Sun editor, Fred Hartman
- Type: Daily newspaper
- Format: Broadsheet
- Owner: Southern Newspapers Inc.
- Publisher: Carol Skewes
- Editor: David Bloom
- Founded: 1919
- Language: English
- Headquarters: Baytown, Texas
- Circulation: 4,598 (as of 2023)
- Sister newspapers: Galveston County Daily News, Brazosport Facts, The Lufkin Daily News
- Website: baytownsun.com

The Baytown Sun, is a newspaper published in Baytown, Texas, United States. It was first published 1919 as the Goose Creek Gasser. The paper is owned by Southern Newspapers Inc., a news-media company based in Houston, Texas.

== History ==
The Baytown Sun was founded in Goose Creek, Texas, as the weekly publication, Goose Creek Gasser, in 1919. By 1928, the paper was operating under the name Daily Tribune. Due to the economic pressures caused by the Great Depression, in 1931 the Daily Tribune merged with newspapers in the nearby communities of Pelly and Baytown. The new newspaper was named the Daily Sun and was published in the Daily Tribune's hometown of Goose Creek. During the mid-1940s the towns of Baytown, Goose Creek and Pelly voted to incorporate into one city, with Baytown being the surviving name. Therefore, in 1949 to better identify with the new community it served, the paper was given its current name, Baytown Sun.

=== Halloween killer ===
In December 1985, the Baytown Police Department received five letters from someone identifying themselves as "Madman" and claiming to have been the killer in the Halloween murder of a local 11-year-old girl. Each letter contained a riddle which when answered, the author stated, would eventually reveal the killer's name. However, if the police answered incorrectly, another child would be killed on Christmas. In an unusual request, the letters also demanded the answers to the riddles be printed on front page of the Baytown Sun. When the Baytown police approached then Sun publisher Leon Brown with the request to publish the answers on the front page, he agreed, stating: "Police Chief Wayne Henscey said their publication could very well save a life. I was convinced, as were my editors, that the Sun's cooperation was a life or death situation..."

== See also ==
- Galveston Bay Area
- Wanda Garner Cash
