= Henry Smith (lynching victim) =

African American who was lynched in the U.S.

Lynching of Henry Smith
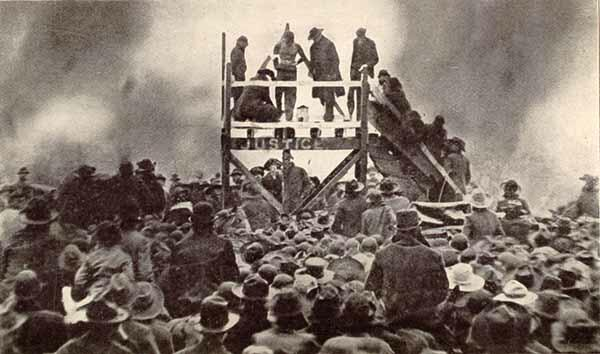
- The lynching of Henry Smith, Paris, Texas, February 1, 1893
- Date: February 1, 1893
- Location: Paris, Texas
- Participants: White mob from Paris, Texas
- Deaths: 1

Henry Smith (d. February 1, 1893) was an African-American youth who was lynched in Paris, Texas. Smith allegedly confessed to murdering the three-year-old daughter of a law enforcement officer who had allegedly beaten him during an arrest. Smith fled, but was recaptured after a nationwide manhunt. He was then returned to Paris, where he was turned over to a mob and burned at the stake. Smith's lynching was covered by The New York Times and attracted national publicity.

== Background ==
The lynching of Henry Smith was part of a broader pattern of public lynchings in the rural South between 1890 and 1940. These lynchings were driven by racial grievances, used public torture as a spectacle, and involved levels of cruelty that the criminal justice system had long disavowed. They scandalized public opinion in liberal states, while defiance of liberal norms strengthened the appeal for whites in the rural South.

Henry Smith was a handyman in Paris, Texas. One day in early 1893, he was seen acting drunk and disorderly, and Deputy Henry Vance was sent to arrest Smith. Smith resisted, and Vance "was forced to use his club" to subdue him. On Thursday, January 26, 1893, Henry Vance's three-year-old daughter disappeared from the front of the boarding house where her family lived. Witnesses said that they saw Smith "picked up little Myrtle Vance ... and ... carry her through the central portion of the city. En route through the city, several people asked him what he was doing with the child." One of the witnesses Smith spoke to was the mayor of Paris. Smith claimed that he was taking her to her mother or the doctor. Smith returned home on Friday morning. His wife asked him about "that white child". Smith replied: "I ain't seen no white child and don't have nothing to do with white folks." Smith left and was not seen again until he was captured in Arkansas.

=== Search and discovery of Myrtle Vance's body ===
About 2:00 p.m. on Friday, January 27, 1893, a search party formed at the courthouse and found the child's body covered by leaves in Gibson's pasture. When the girl was found dead on the side of a road, the townspeople were furious. Rumor spread that the victim had suffered severe injuries from rape and physical mutilation. However, an investigation by journalist Ida B. Wells revealed it to be her opinion that the rape accusation was false:

As a matter of fact, the child was not brutally assaulted as the world has been told, as an excuse for the awful barbarism of that day. Persons who saw the child after her death have stated, under the most solemn pledge to truth, that there was no evidence of such an assault as was published at that time; only a slight abrasion and discoloration were primarily noticeable about the neck.

However, Doctors Chapman and Baldwin, who were the examiners of the three-year-old murdered child, stated that the child died from wounds she suffered from being "outraged", a word used in place of rape during the time and that the abrasions and wounds about the rest of her body were not significant. The child's bloody underclothes were found some feet away from the body.

Report of Physicians Who Examined the Body of the Child.

SWORN STATEMENT

Of the Physicians Who Examined Myrtle Yance, the victim.

On the 26th day of January 1893, by request of A. Cate, mayor of Paris, and J. C. Hunt, Justice of the Peace Precinct No. I, Lamar County, Texas, examined the dead body of Myrtle Vance, aged about three years. We found the body in a semi-rigid state and based our opinion on the fact that death had occurred not more than six or eight hours previous. The chest, abdomen, and lower extremities were covered with blood and bruises under the angle of each jaw, giving evidence of an effort at strangulation and abrasion in front of the left ear. Found complete laceration of the perineum, extending an inch and a half up the rectum. The posterior part of the vagina ruptured, connecting the abdominal cavity with the vagina, parts bruised and mutilated, unmistakable evidence of rape, hair from the mons-veneris of the negro being found on the pudendum of the baby, held by the clotted blood.

J. B. CHAPMAN, M. D., City Health Officer.

wo S. BALDWIX, M. D.

=== Manhunt and capture ===
The search for the alleged murderer captured the public imagination, and railroad companies offered free transportation to anyone involved in the manhunt. Smith was tracked east through Reno and Detroit, Texas. On January 31, he was captured near his hometown in Hempstead County, Arkansas, at the unincorporated flag station, Clow, Arkansas, 50 miles from the Texas border. Search party members from Paris immediately identified Smith.

Initially denying any involvement in the murder, Smith finally confessed on the train to Paris. He said that he was drunk and was motivated by revenge against the child's father. Smith said that he spent the night sleeping in the pasture next to the dying child, killing her by suffocation when he awoke the next morning.

=== Return to Paris ===
Newspapers described the murder of Myrtle Vance as the most atrocious killing in the history of Texas. Shortly after Smith's capture, residents decided to take the law into their own hands to make "the punishment fit the crime" and allow the victim's family to participate.

When the train transporting Smith arrived at the stop at Texarkana, Arkansas, it was met by a mob estimated at 5,000. A committee from Paris urged "that the prisoner not be molested by the Texarkana people, but that the guard be allowed to deliver him" to the citizens of Paris. The mob agreed.

When Smith realized what was awaiting him, Smith begged the police officers guarding him to shoot him instead of taking him to meet his fate at the hands of the mob. The city's mayor ordered all the bars closed the night before Smith's arrival, and disorderly crowds were broken up. Schools were closed on the day of his arrival. They said that "it was not in the power of all the officers in Texas to save him ... they could not if they [wanted to] ... as they themselves were virtually prisoners in the hands of the committee from Paris." Smith repeatedly asked his guards to shoot him and not turn him over to the mob. Smith's train arrived in Paris at 1 PM on February 1. "A committee demanded Smith of [City Marshall] Shanklin. He told them that he could not. They pointed to the great multitude of armed, angry men and told him those men were there to take Smith at all hazards. Shanklin submitted and went away, seeing resistance was useless and there would be a bloody riot."

== Lynching ==
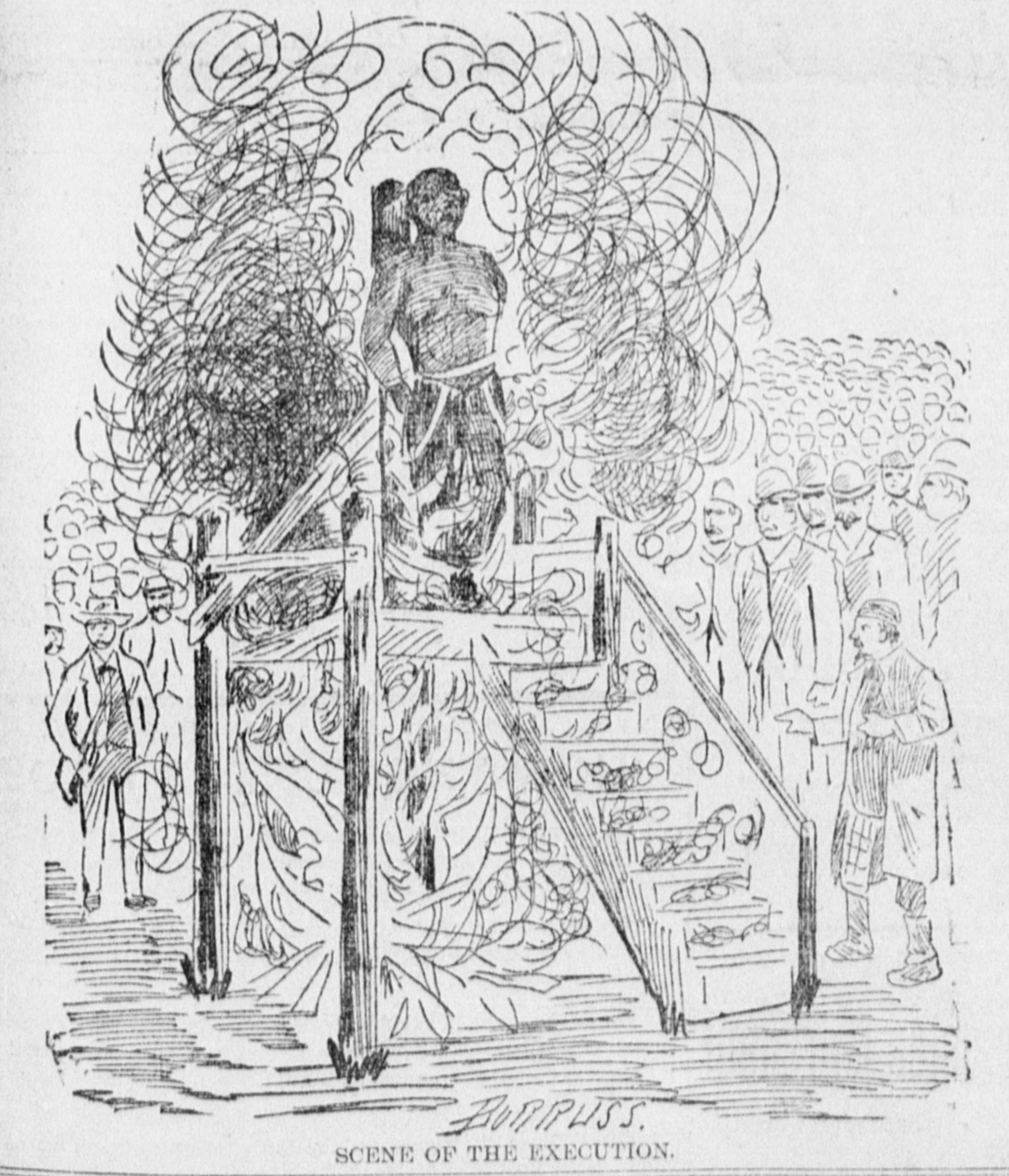
A sketch of Smith being burned, from the front page of the Fort Worth Gazette the following day.

A large crowd of from 5,000 to 15,000 people took Smith from his captors and placed him on a mule cart. They paraded Smith through town and to an open stretch of prairie between the cemetery and railroad tracks. There, organizers had built a 10-foot scaffold painted with the word "Justice".

Smith was tied up and tortured for 50 minutes by Henry Vance, Vance's 15-year-old son, and Vance's brother-in-law. The men placed hot irons under Smith's feet, burned his trunk and limbs, burned both eyes out with hot irons, and then shoved a hot iron down his throat. A February 2 article in the New York Sun reported: "Every groan from the fiend, every contortion of his body was cheered by the thickly packed crowd." The February 2 edition of the Boston Daily Globe deemed Smith's grotesque execution "White Savagery" and claimed, "Civilization Seemingly a Failure in Texas."

Finally, the crowd poured coal oil (kerosene) over Smith and set the scaffold on fire. According to some newspaper accounts, Smith remained alive during the burning. After the rope binding, Smith fell off the scaffolding and attempted to get away, but onlookers kicked him back into the flames. After the fire reduced Smith's body to a brittle cinder, members of the crowd sifted through the ashes to collect Smith's bones and shards of wood as souvenirs. On February 6, the governor of Texas, Jim Hogg, referred to the lynching of Henry Smith as a "terrible holocaust" and railed against mob violence in the state.

On February 8, the bullet-riddled body of William Butler, Smith's stepson, was found hanging from a tree.

== Aftermath ==
=== Governor James S. Hogg ===
Shortly before Smith's arrival in Paris, Texas Governor James S. Hogg in Austin sent separate wires to the County Attorney in Paris and to local law enforcement urging them to prevent a lynching.

To the county attorney, Paris: Your conduct in having Smith arrested deserves special commendation. See that he has a fair trial in the courts to the end that he may he legally punished. Take all steps necessary to protect him from violence. This is due to your community and to the State. To the sheriffs of Lamar and Bowie Counties: Use all lawful means to see that Henry Smith is protected from mob violence and is brought to trial for his crime before lawful authority. Mobs must not be permitted to try prisoners in Texas.

Sheriff D. S. Hammond of Lamar County wired the Governor back saying: "I am helpless. Have no support." Lamar County Assistant County Attorney E. A. McCuistion responded: "Officers are helpless. An enraged public stands waiting for the prisoner, who is expected at 1 o'clock."

The Governor responded to the Sheriff Hammond:

If you need help call for it. By all means protect the majesty of the law and the honor of Texas and your people from committing murder.

He also wrote to ACA McCuistion:

Wire those in charge of the prisoner not to bring him to Paris. Guard him safely and use every effort to prevent the mob from reaching him.

Sheriff Hammond replied to the Governor: "Henry Smith has arrived and is in charge of from 5,000 to 10,000 enraged citizens. I am utterly helpless to protect him." Shortly afterwards, ACA McCuistion wired the Governor: "All is over: death by hot iron torture – diabolical affair."

Hogg issued the following orders to the offices of the County Attorney and law-enforcement offices:

To the county attorney of Lamar County: Do your whole duty and prosecute every person engaged in the reported lynching of one Henry Smith, at Paris. By all means preserve the names of the offenders and witnesses to the end that the guilty parties may be prosecuted.

To the sheriff of Lamar County, Paris, Texas: Discharge your sworn duty as an officer of the State faithfully and fearlessly. Promptly make complaint before the proper officers against every person known to have been engaged in the lynching of the negro, Henry Smith, at Paris, on yesterday, and report the names of all witnesses to the district and county attorney, to the end that all guilty persons may be effectively prosecuted.

To N. P. Doak, district attorney, Clarksville, Texas: In the lynching of the negro, Henry Smith, in Paris, on yesterday, the laws of the State have been openly defied. Every good citizen is interested in maintaining and enforcing the laws of the land. Either law and order or anarchy must prevail, and there can be no compromise or middle ground. Mob law in Texas must be stamped out. It is believed and expected that you will promptly, diligently and persistently inquire into and ascertain who are the guilty parties, and faithfully and fearlessly prosecute them. Any assistance needed will be promptly rendered.

The Paris Daily News argued that by the time Gov. Hogg started wiring officials (shortly before Smith's train was expected to arrive), it was not possible to prevent his lynching, even if they had wanted to do so. They opined that Gov. Hogg's orders were "looked upon as a joke. It is not believed that he means it. It is impossible to embody into a wired special to The News the various phases of public sentiment, all drifting in one direction."

But on February 6, Gov. Hogg sent an open letter to the Texas legislature urging them to stiffen the state laws against lynching. He wanted to allow the family of the victim to sue for damages, to make the local sheriff ineligible to run for re-election if a prisoner is taken from his custody and harmed, and to allow for changes of venue when there is a risk of mob violence. His letter concluded:

When passion in its wild rush for blood overrides the law and tramples down the Constitution, a precedent for anarchy is set, marking the way for the destruction of this Government. Patriotic action on the line of wisdom and justice now becomes necessary to prevent its spread. Repeated overt criminal acts in this State have sounded the warning. The power rests with your honorable bodies to encourage anarchy by silence or to crush it by suitable action. Strengthen the laws, supply the means, and if the Executive fails to perform his duties fully, under all circumstances, then let him stand condemned as a criminal himself before the civilized world.

=== Facts in the Case tract ===
The Paris Daily News produced a tract entitled The Facts in the Case of the Horrible Murder of Little Myrtle Vance and its Fearful Expiation at Paris, Texas, February 1^{st}, 1893. The book was written by James Pleasant, uncle of the child, with the corroboration of his brother Henry Vance. The copyright of the tract was signed over to Henry Vance and the proceeds of its sale were intended for the Vance family. It included photographs related to the murder and the lynching, official communications between Gov. Hogg and local Lamar County officials, and editorial comments (pro and con) from various newspapers.

== Bibliography ==
=== References ===
- "Torture in Texas – Savage Cruelty Visited Upon a Negro Miscreant – Put to an Excruciating Death". Aurora Daily Express. Vol. 11, no. 3, 223. Aurora, Illinois. February 2, 1893. p. 2, col. 2 – via Google News Archive.
- Bills, E. R. (né Eddie Ray Bills II) (2015). Black Holocaust: The Paris Horror and a Legacy of Texas Terror. Fort Worth, Texas: Eakin Press. ISBN 9781681790176. OCLC 922702180.
- "Burned at the Stake – Terrible Punishment for Negro Murderer – Henry Smith Tortured by Use of White Hot Irons – Oil-Fed Flames Ended His Sufferings – Father of His Victim His Executioner – Best Citizens of Paris, Tex., Aid in the Affair". Boston Daily Globe. Vol. 43, no. 33. February 2, 1893. pp. 1 (col. 8) & 8 (col. 8) – via Newspapers.com.
- "Paris Holocaust – Rev. King's Story Denounced". Dallas Morning News. Vol. 8, no. 139. February 16, 1893. p. 6, col. 6 (top) – via GenealogyBank.com.
- "Branded, Blistered, Burned, – [illegible]ed, Was the Form of Rapist-Murderer-Savage Fiendish Negro, Henry Smith – Caucasian Vengence Barbarity". Fort Worth Gazette. Vol. 17, no. 81. Democrat Publishing Company. February 16, 1893. p. 1 – via Portal to Texas History.
- Garland, David (2010). Peculiar Institution: America's Death Penalty in an Age of Abolition. Cambridge, Massachusetts: The Belknap Press of Harvard University Press.
- "The Paris Horror". Galveston Daily News. Vol. 51, no. 318. February 5, 1893. p. 8, col. 6 – via Portal to Texas History.
- Giddings, Paula (2008). Ida – A Sword Among Lions: Ida B. Wells and the Campaign Against Lynching. Amistad, and imprint of HarperCollins. ISBN 9780060519216. OCLC 149167871.
- Vance, Henry (1893). The Facts in the Case of the Horrible Murder of Little Myrtle Vance and Its Fearful Expiation at Paris, Texas, February 1^{st}, 1893, With Photographic Illustrations. Paris, Texas: P. L. James (publisher). LCCN 01000615. OCLC 1081072569 – via Library of Congress.
- "Another Negro Burned – Henry Smith Dies at the Stake – Drawn Through the Streets on a Car – Tortured for Nearly an Hour With Hot Irons and Then Burned – Awful Vengeance of a Paris (Texas) Mob". The New York Times. Vol. 42, no. 12, 931. February 2, 1893. p. 1, col. 5. ISSN 0362-4331 – via TimesMachine.
- Osofsky, Gilbert (1967). The Burden of Race: A Documentary History of Negro-white Relations in America (1^{st} ed.). Harper & Row. pp. 181–184. OCLC 1089588238 – via History Matters (website), George Mason University. ""Burned at the Stake: A Black Man Pays for a Town's Outrage", The Sun (New York City, February 2, 1893) – "The cause of the crime was that Henry Vance when a deputy policeman, in the course of his duty was called to arrest Henry Smith for being drunk and disorderly. The Negro was unruly, and Vance was forced to use his club."
- "Burned at the Stake: A Black Man Pays for a Town's Outrage". The Sun. New York City. February 2, 1893. p. 1, col. 5 – via History Matters (website), George Mason University.
- Wells, Ida B. (1894). The Red Record: Lynchings In the United States: 1892–1893–1894 (Pamphlet). Chicago: Donohue & Henneberry, printers, binders, and engravers. ISBN 9781504017305. OCLC 35692609. "Respectfully submitted to the Nineteenth Century civilization in 'the Land of the Free and the Home of the Brave'"
- Williamson, Joel (1984). The Crucible of Race. Oxford University Press. ISBN 9780195033823. OCLC 995878129.
