= Judy Barbour =

Judy Barbour is a cookbook author and former food columnist for the Bay City Tribune. The publisher of multiple works on the foods of the Western United States, particularly Wyoming, Texas, and Colorado, Barbour worked alongside her husband in running multiple restaurants, a hunting lodge, and a flight program for hunters. A former model and beauty title winner, she also spent her time working on original clothing lines involving leather outfits and incorporating Native American styles.

== Childhood and education ==
Born Judy Rhea as a fifth generation Texan, Barbour attended Wharton High School and was the salutatorian of her class before earning a Bachelor's degree at the University of Houston in education.

== Career ==
Barbour was a professional model who performed and won multiple beauty titles in contests. Working with her husband on his big-game hunting in addition to his farming and ranching, she went to Jackson, Wyoming in November 1975 to get a pilot license for both commercial and industrial piloting. She completed her private license in the summer of 1976 and the commercial license by the fall of the same year, while practicing with her family's Cessna 310. The purpose of the license was so she could fly other hunters out to the western woods of Wyoming for their hunting trips. She also worked as owner and chef for the four restaurants she ran alongside her husband in Bay City, Texas.

The couple spent half the year in Texas and the other half in Wyoming because of their split enterprises in both locations. In 1978, Barbour published the book Elegant Elk, Delicious Deer, a cookbook on how to prepare different types of wild game and aimed at women who are married to hunters. During her time spent in both locations, Barbour worked on designing leather clothing in styles similar to the Native Americans of Wyoming. The popularity of her designs led to a personal cottage industry with four employees helping her source fabrics and complete dresses. The couple's first restaurant named Barry's was established in 1984 in Bay City as a barbeque restaurant, which later expanded to steak and seafood and also features a wild array of taxidermized animals that her husband had hunted.

She published another book in 1988 called Cowboy Chow that featured recipes from her restaurants and from various recipes she found while traveling across the Western United States. The book was shaped like a cowboy boot and the cover was printed on leather with a red bandana print covering the book. Published through the Cookbook Resources publishing house, Cowboy Chow was involved through Barbour's publisher in the lawsuit Barbour v. Head against cookbook author James Head for the publication of an internet magazine that included Barbour's recipes without approval or attribution. The judge ruled in Barbour's favor, creating a legal decision that, under certain circumstances, individual recipes had copyright protection.

She followed up this work in 1989 with the book Wonderful Wyoming: Facts and Food that not only served as a cookbook of Wyoming traditional meals, but also history about the region. The book's release was timed to coincide with the centennial of Wyoming becoming a state. The hunting business Barbour and her husband owned in Jackson Hole, Wyoming was eventually sold in the early 1990's so they could focus on their restaurants in Texas. They then rehoused and loaned out the collection of taxidermized animals that had been kept at the hunting lodge. Barbour later worked as a recipe writer and food history journalist for the Bay City Tribune for eighteen years, in total publishing around 2,500 recipes across 500 articles.

== Bibliography ==
- — (1978). Elegant Elk, Delicious Deer. J. Barbour Books. ISBN 9780686331780.
- — (1988). Cowboy Chow. J. Barbour Books. p. 77. ISBN 9780961174606.
- — (1989). Wonderful Wyoming: Facts and Foods. J. Barbour Books. p. 64. ISBN 9780961174613.
- — (1990). Colorado Foods and More. Rendezvous Ventures. p. 63. ISBN 9780961174620.
- — (1992). Gathering of the Game. J. Barbour Books. p. 138. ISBN 9780961174699.
- —; Barbour, Barry (2005). Trophy Hunters' Wild Game Cookbook. Cookbook Resources, LLC. p. 184. ISBN 9781931294751.
- —; Barbour, Barry (2007). Cowboy Cattle Drive. J. Barbour Books. ISBN 9780961174668.

== Personal life ==
She married Barry Barbour on January 31, 1958 and they had two sons together.
