= The Paris News =

Newspaper in Paris, Texas

Paris News
- The Paris News (August 26, 2018 issue)
- Type: Daily newspaper
- Format: Broadsheet
- Owner: Southern Newspapers
- Publisher: Kelsey Graham
- Editor: Evan Grice (Managing)
- Founded: 1869
- Headquarters: 5050 Loop 286 SE; Paris, Texas 75460; United States
- Circulation: 3,032 (as of 2023)
- Website: theparisnews.com

The Paris News is a newspaper based in Paris, Texas, covering the Northeast Texas counties of Lamar, Delta, Red River and Fannin, plus Choctaw County, Oklahoma. It publishes three days a week (Tuesdays, Thursdays, and Sundays). It is owned by Southern Newspapers Inc.

== History ==
The paper traces its roots to The North Texan, founded in 1869 by Addison Harvey Boyd (1835–1984), and a newspaper published by his younger brother, Austin Pollard Boyd (1843–1902). The younger Boyd bought the North Texan and merged the publications, running a daily newspaper known as the Paris Morning News until his death in 1902. One of A.P. Boyd's sons, Sayers James Boyd (1879–1934), became editor and publisher.

In 1916, a devastating fire destroyed most of Paris' downtown area, including the newspaper office and all records. Sayers continued as publisher until early April 1920, when he sold the paper the North Texas Publishing Company, whose principal shareholders were Paris business people – Harry Thomas Warner (1870–1925), former managing editor of the Houston Post, became editor. In 1929, the nascent Harte-Hanks newspaper company bought the Morning News as one of its first acquisitions. The publication schedule was changed and it was renamed the Paris Evening News soon thereafter, and changed its name to the Paris News in 1937.

Harte-Hanks sold the newspaper to Worrell Communications in 1986, which in turn dealt it to Southern Newspapers three years later.

A. G. "Pat" Mayse (né Andy Granville Mayse; 1889–1955) served as publisher from 1929 until his death. He was succeeded by Walter Willet Bassano, Jr. (1907–1996), his son-in-law, who was publisher until 1972. Walter's son, Pat Mayse Bassano (born 1942), took the post beginning in 1974 until Michael David Graxiola (born 1954) was installed in the post when Southern Newspapers bought the newspaper. The company moved Graxiola to the Kerrville Daily Times in 2009, bringing in Patrick Hardin Graham (born 1968). Graham then became publisher of the Galveston County Daily News August 29, 2011, and was replaced by J. D. Davidson (né Jon Douglas Davidson; born 1968). Davidson was replaced by Relan Walker in 2017, and she was succeeded by Clay Carsner in February 2021.

In 2026, Carsner left The Paris News and was replaced by Kelsey Graham as Publisher.
