= Angleton Times =

Local newspaper in Angleton, Texas

Angleton Times was a newspaper headquartered in Angleton, Texas.

The newspaper, initially based in Velasco, Texas, was established in 1892. Originally it was published five times per week. The Houston Chronicle stated that the publication was established in Angleton in 1893, and the Handbook of Texas stated that the publication moved to that city circa 1894. Its publication frequency became five times per week after the move.

== Decline and closure ==
At the end of its life, Southern Newspapers Inc. owned the publication. Circa 1999 the newspaper reduced its publishing schedule to two days per week, Wednesday and Saturday. In 2004 the Angleton Times had 1,100 subscribers; that year the Brazosport Facts had an Angleton circulation of 4,000, and there were 730 people/entities who/which subscribed to both newspapers.

The newspaper closed in 2004. At the time it had 14 employees, with six being part-time and the rest being full-time. Russell Burnett Jr. was the publisher at the time of closing. The newspaper owners gave severance packages to the majority of employees while The Facts gave jobs to the other five. The latter publication obtained the reader list of the Angleton Times, and the former Angleton Times office became the Angleton office of The Facts.
