= Carmage Walls =

American newspaper businessman

Benjamin Carmage Walls (October 28, 1908 - November 22, 1998) was a newspaperman in the United States. He owned numerous community newspapers and founded Southern Newspapers.

== Biography ==
Walls was born October 28, 1908, in Crisp County, Georgia, moving to Orlando, Florida, while still young where he attended high school. He got started with the newspaper business when a stranger approached him as child and asked if he wanted a job "stuffing newspapers". He took the job and worked up from being a "stuffer" inserting sentimental sections in the main newspaper until he was a "right-hand man" of the head man Charles E. Marsh. From this start he went on to purchase and invest in newspaper businesses over large parts of the U.S. from Texas up to Ohio. Walls was known nationally for his newspaper operations from around the 1930s.

During his 60 some odd years in the newspaper business he owned various papers. He opposed George C. Wallace's segregationist policies.

The Southern Newspaper Publishers Association presented a Carmage Walls Commentary Prize. As of 2022 Southern Newspapers underwrites the prize. Southern Newspapers' CEO is his daughter Lissa Walls Cribb

In June 1953 he wrote a letter laying out some of his newspaper business philosophies starting by stating "wealth cannot be made by doing nothing" and declaring that newspapers are a "semi-public utility".

== Death and recognition ==
Walls died aged 90 at his Houston home on November 22, 1998, and was survived by his wife, Martha Anna Walls, four children, a sister and a brother. After his death his widow and daughter carried forward his work in 2012 they owned and managed 15 newspaper operations, mostly in Texas.

In 2008 he was inducted into the Alabama Newspaper Hall of Honor, then in 2012 he was inducted into the Texas Newspaper Hall of Fame.
