= Southern Newspapers =

Southern Newspapers Inc. (SNI) is a publishing holding company headquartered in Houston, Texas. The company was founded as Southern Newspapers, Inc., of Tennessee in 1967 by Carmage Walls. Its flagship paper, the Galveston County Daily News is the oldest newspaper in Texas, founded in 1842.

== Publications ==
The company owns several publications, primarily in Texas.

=== Current publications ===
The April 19, 1842 front page of The Daily News, forerunner to the Galveston County Daily News.

- Bay City Tribune (1845) , Bay City, Texas
- Baytown Sun (1949) , Baytown, Texas
- Brazosport Facts (1913) , Brazoria County, Texas
- The Daily Sentinel (1899) , Nacogdoches, Texas
- Fort Payne Times-Journal , Fort Payne, Alabama
- The Galveston County Daily News (1842) , Galveston, Texas
- Kerrville Daily Times (1908) , Kerrville, Texas
- Lufkin Daily News (1906) , Lufkin, Texas
- New Braunfels Herald-Zeitung (1852) , New Braunfels, Texas
- The Paris News (1869) , Paris, Texas
- Sand Mountain Reporter , Albertville, Alabama
- Scottsboro Daily Sentinel , Scottsboro, Alabama
- Seguin Gazette (1888) , Seguin, Texas
- Walton Tribune , Monroe, Georgia

=== Defunct publications ===
- Angleton Times (1893–2004) - absorbed by the Brazosport Facts
- Del Rio News-Herald (1929–2020) - discontinued
- Texas City Sun (1912–2004) - absorbed by the Galveston County Daily News
- Weekly Post (1986–2010) - absorbed by sister paper, the Fort Payne Times-Journal.
