= Wharton Independent School District =

School district in Texas, United States

Wharton High School

Location
- 1 Tiger Avenue; Wharton, (Wharton County), Texas 77488; United States
- 29.3286°N 96.0840°W

Information
- Type: Public high school
- Principal: Diana Bell
- Staff: 43.03 (FTE)
- Enrollment: 584 (2023-24)
- Student to teacher ratio: 13.57
- Colors: Blue and red
- Nickname: Tigers

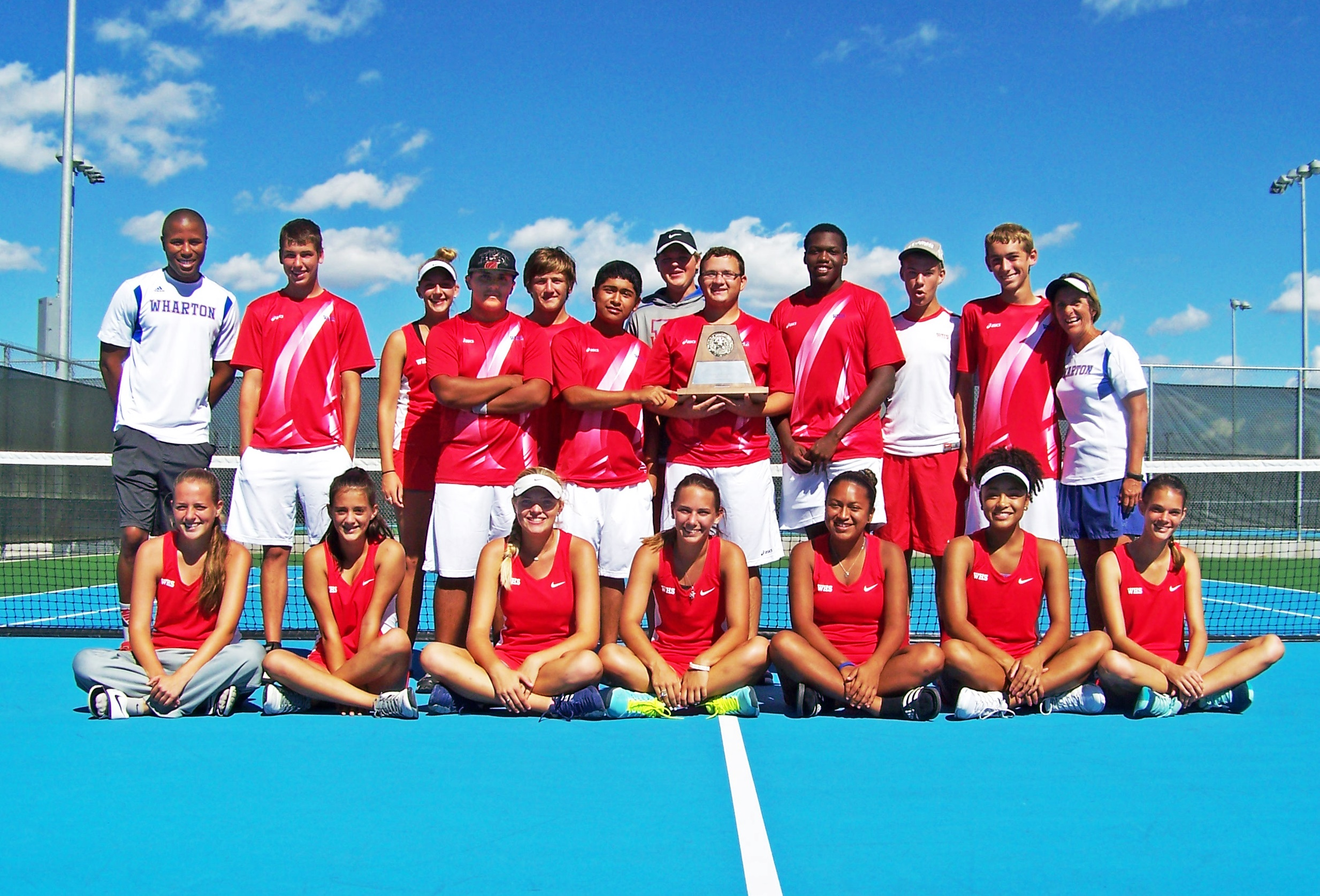
The Wharton ISD Wharton High School Tennis Team is the District 27 and Area Team Tennis Champions, and the Region IV 4A Team Tennis Runner-up.

Wharton Independent School District is a public school district based in Wharton, Texas (USA). Wharton ISD's motto is "Preparing Today for a Competitive Tomorrow."

The district includes Wharton and a portion of Hungerford.

In 2014, the Wharton Independent School District was rated "Met Standard" by the Texas Education Agency.

== Schools ==
- Wharton High School (Grades 9–12)
- Wharton Junior High School (Grades 6–8)
- Wharton Elementary School (Grades 3–5)
- Sivells Elementary School (Grades PK-2)

== Notable alumni ==
- Kellen Heard, former NFL player
- Jim Kearney, former NFL player
- Lamar Lathon, former NFL player
- Leroy Mitchell, former NFL player
- Willie Parker, former NFL player
- Harrison Stafford, former NFL player
- Judy Barbour, cookbook author
