= The Daily Sentinel (Texas) =

Daily newspaper based in Nacogdoches, Texas, USA

- Type: Daily newspaper
- Format: Broadsheet
- Owner: Southern Newspapers Inc.
- Publisher: Rick Craig
- Editor: Josh Edwards
- Founded: 1899
- Headquarters: 3500 North St Ste 4, Nacogdoches, TX 75961; United States
- Circulation: 2,622 (as of 2023)
- Website: www.dailysentinel.com

The Daily Sentinel is a daily newspaper based in Nacogdoches, Texas, USA.

== History ==
Cox Newspapers bought the paper in 1989. They sold it, along with the nearby East Texas daily Lufkin Daily News, to Southern Newspapers in 2009.

It changed from afternoon to morning publication in 1996.
