= Somerville Independent School District =

School district in Texas, United States

Address
- 625 8th Street Somerville, Texas, 77879; United States

District information
- Type: Public
- Grades: PK–12
- Schools: 3
- NCES District ID: 4840770

Students and staff
- Students: 536 (2023–2024)
- Teachers: 48.26 (on an FTE basis) (2023–2024)
- Staff: 44.49 (on an FTE basis) (2023–2024)
- Student–teacher ratio: 11.11 (2023–2024)

Other information
- Website: www.somervilleisd.org

Somerville Independent School District is a small, rural, public school district based in Somerville, Texas, United States. The district serves students in southern Burleson County.

== History of Somerville ISD ==
In 1903, the Somerville Independent School District was established, and a two-story K-12 public school was built by 1905. The mascot for the school became the Yegua Indian, and the school colors became orange and black. Later, in 1928, another school building was constructed for high school students only.

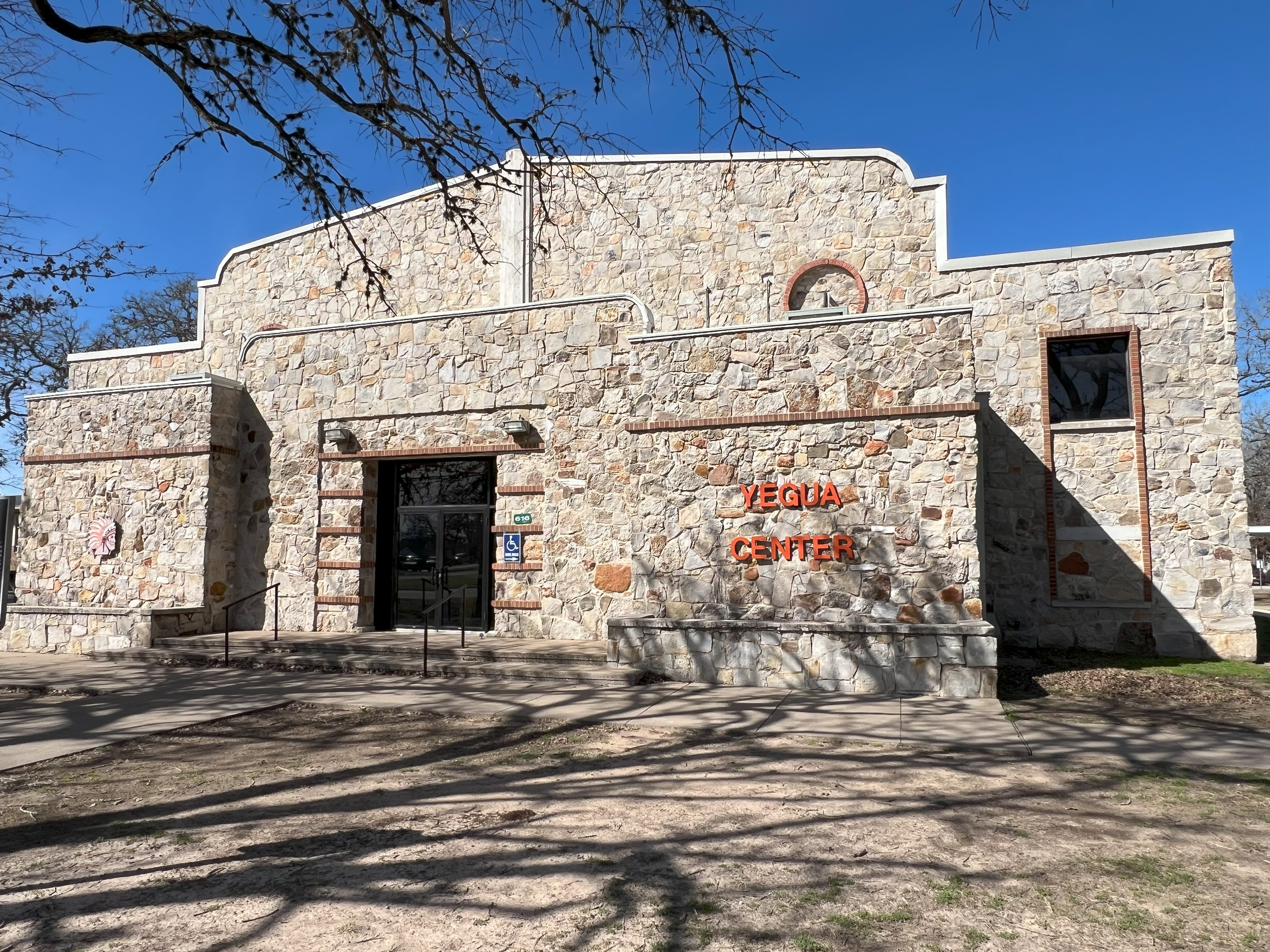
Historic Landmark

== History of Yegua Stadium and Yegua Center ==
In later years, the local school board began working with the Works Projects Administration (WPA) to build a football stadium. The WPA was established as a relief measure during the Great Depression; the greatest single area of WPA spending in Texas was construction. The first impact of the WPA creation was economic since the small communities were able to locally employ their own able, skilled, and unskilled workers. Today, many individuals and communities still value their WPA schools and school-related projects as part of their heritage. They continue to use and preserve these sturdy and aesthetically beautiful buildings, gyms, and athletic fields. The Somerville School Board consisting of M. V. Carson, C. F. Hardt, C. V. Welch, C. J. Keese, C. N. Bellenger, Nello Strickland, and Gus Giesenschlag, along with Superintendent of Schools D. W. Cox worked with Travis Broesche, architect, and Joseph Hahn, WPA Superintendent, to do construction for the Somerville Independent School District. One of the projects to be built was a football stadium, which was to be built using heavy stone quarried in the nearby Yegua Creek bottom. On October 3, 1938, a WPA Project Proposal, addressed to the Works Progress Administration of Houston, Texas, was prepared. Stated on the form was a request that the proposal be reviewed and that a formal application be made for an allotment of funds for the building of a native rock gymnasium and auditorium with a stage, locker rooms, shower rooms, and lecture rooms, as well as construction of a lighted softball and football field in Somerville, Texas. The amount requested and approved was $37,852.20. The three applications were approved, and construction began. At the July 2, 1940, school board meeting, the board accepted the project as being completed. In a conversation with Bill Neinast, Class of 1946, he stated, “The stone for both the gym and football stadium came from the Friedrich Amandus Neinast hill in Washington County. The supervisor of the men was Joe Hahn, who had no previous experience as a stone mason nor, I think, any experience in the building trades.” Mr. O. B. Lewis, who was born in 1911, wrote his memoirs of Somerville and included the following in his writing: “A WPA project was the fence on the football field and the gym building made of rock. A crew of about thirty men was used to load the rocks on flatbed trucks and then haul them to the building site. There were at least one hundred men used to build this rock fence, stadium, and gym. None of these men had ever done this type of work before; their pay was about $2.00 per day. The total cost of this project was less than $3,000. I have heard Clyde Welch, who was on the school board at that time, give the cost of this work, and that money was for the steel beams used in the gym.” The following was stated in a copy of the 1939 The Burleson County Ledger: “At present, Somerville has a school system with facilities adequate for a town much larger than Somerville. The school district is also engaged in a building program to the extent of about sixty thousand dollars under a WPA project. The plan provides for a gymnasium-auditorium with all other rooms and equipment necessary for a physical education program. This project will also give Somerville one of the best-lighted and equipped athletic fields in this section of the country.” The lengths of the four walls of the football stadium are as follows: south and north walls—approximately 555 feet; east and west walls—approximately 295 feet. The four heights of the walls are approximately seven feet except for the wall backing the stands, which extends to approximately 18 feet. At one time, the local school board was concerned about the safety of the south wall because of a crack, and the wall appeared to be leaning. Several members of the Somerville Historical Society attended a school board meeting in February 1988 to express their concerns about the wall possibly being torn down. They stated the purpose of the Historical Society was to preserve and made several suggestions to save the south wall. While these members were in agreement that something needed to be done, they asked the school board to do what they could to preserve the wall for posterity. The board made a motion to preserve the football stadium and to authorize the securing of professional help in preserving the stadium. At the July 26, 1988, school board meeting, it was reported that a visual inspection had been made of the stadium, and Mr. Bob Segner and Mr. James Marsh of Texas A&M Construction Department made suggestions to repair the wall. A portion was cut out, reinforced, and rebuilt as close to the original as possible. Several suggestions were also made to make the wall structurally safe. At the June 1989 board meeting, the board was informed that the stadium wall was complete, and the area below the press box on the west side of the stadium had also been secured. The main purpose of the football stadium was, of course, to have a place to teach students to play football and then to host football games. Although a practice field was built several years later in another location, the Rock remains the site of all home football games. In the 1950’s, baseball was also played at the football stadium. In a conversation with Donald Lee Strickland, Class of 1945, who was the coach at that time, he verified that the baseball team did play there. He said, “Home plate was about where the 30-yard line is on the football field. There wasn’t another place to play baseball, and so they played on the football field for several years.” In a conversation with Frank Maldonado, Sr., Class of 1950, he, too, remembered baseball being played there as he was on the team. He remembered all those who played on the team with him and the positions they each played. Other school events that have been held at the football stadium include powder puff football games and high school graduation ceremonies. Burleson County youth football games continue to be played in the stadium. The football field has always been open to the public, also. An annual event in Somerville is the Sunrise Service on Easter morning. Members of all congregations are invited to attend this service. In an interview with Gloria Sager, Class of 1947, concerning the football stadium, she stated that in the 1940s, these services were held at the football stadium, and huge crowds would gather to participate in the Easter service. An event of historical significance also was held at the Somerville football stadium. A milestone in the history of Burleson County was reached when Lake Somerville was completed and opened to the public. Community leaders from Burleson and Washington Counties worked diligently for this project. On September 22, 1962, Vice-President Lyndon B. Johnson and Representative Homer Thornberry turned the first spades of dirt for the $17 Million Somerville Dam and Reservoir Project. H. H. Baker, a large landowner along the Yegua who had worked tirelessly for the project, was the master of ceremonies for the program, which was held in Yegua Stadium in Somerville. Vice President Johnson gave a speech to approximately 4,000 persons in attendance at the football stadium concerning the groundbreaking of this project. Vice President Johnson flew into Easterwood Airport in College Station, Texas, before being driven to Somerville to deliver his speech. Also in attendance was his wife, Lady Bird Johnson. Both at the airport and at the football stadium, Vice-President and Mrs. Johnson signed autographs for their many fans. They enjoyed a barbecue lunch at the American Legion Hall across the street from the football stadium in Somerville. At the April 15, 2015, Somerville School Board Meeting, the board, consisting of Bryan Crook, James Douglas, Linda Pinkerton, Melissa Tharp, Joe Gonzales, Stanley Smith, and Jason Urbanosky, discussed the wishes of the Somerville Ex-Students Association to pursue designating the Yegua Center and the Football Stadium with historical markers to preserve the history of each structure. Following Superintendent Charles Camarillo’s recommendation that the Board take action to approve this request, the Board voted to unanimously approve the request. The football stadium holds much significance for the Somerville community. Bill Neinast states, “I hold those WPA structures in Somerville in awe. They were built by unskilled labor more than 75 years ago and are still straight, strong, and useful.” In an interview with KBTX News, Superintendent Charles Camarillo stated, “People come to play at the Rock. It’s unique, and people and teams that come here for the first time comment on how unique it is. It’s probably one of a kind; you don’t find these anymore, back when times were tough and people persevered. A lot of memories are tied to this place.” Tim Edwards, Class of 1963, played football at the Rock during his high school years. The 1962 team that Tim was a part of won both district and bi-district honors. Tim went on to become a head football coach; he coached for 27 years, and on May 31, 1997, he was inducted into the Hurst-Euless-Bedford Sports Hall of Fame. He received many other honors throughout his coaching career. When asked about his feelings about the Somerville football field, he stated, “The field has been a place the community has gathered to support the students, bands, cheerleaders, Homecoming Courts, and teams for many years. It is very dear to everyone who has been a part of any of these groups as well as the entire community.” Somerville Ex-Students gather at the field every year for Homecoming. During pregame ceremonies, the members of the class celebrating their 50th anniversary of their high school graduation are introduced and walk out on the field, along with officers of the Ex-Students Association. Many memories are recalled about this special place.

== Schools ==
- Somerville High School (Grades 8-12)
- Somerville Intermediate School (Grades 5-7)
- Somerville Elementary School (Grades PK-4)

== Texas Education Agency ratings ==
In 2022, the Texas Education Agency rated Somerville ISD with an overall score of 85 out of 100 and a "B" rating. This rating measures how much students are learning in each grade and whether or not they are ready for the next grade. It also shows how well a school or district prepares their students for success after high school in college, the workforce, or the military.

== Demographics ==
As of 2022, the demographics of Somerville ISD by race/ethnicity were 17.9% - African American, 35.1% - Hispanic, and 39.4% - White. Somerville ISD serves a student population where 72.6% were identified as Economically Disadvantaged, and 9.4% were Emergent Bilingual/English Learners.
