= Times-Journal =

The Times-Journal
- The Times-Journal; June 4, 2008
- Type: Daily newspaper
- Format: Broadsheet
- Owner: Southern Newspapers
- Publisher: Tricia Dunne
- Managing editor: Emily Kirby
- Founded: 1878
- Language: English
- Headquarters: 811 Greenhill Blvd. NW; Fort Payne, Alabama, 35967
- Circulation: 5,000 (Tuesday, Thursday and Saturday)
- Website: times-journal.com

The Times-Journal newspaper is published twice a week in Fort Payne, Alabama and serves the DeKalb County, Alabama region. The Times-Journal was a Southern Newspapers publication for 60 years before selling to Patrick Graham in 2019, along with sister papers in Albertville and Scottsboro. The Times-Journal resulted from the merger in 1959 of the Fort Payne Journal, first published in 1878, and the Times-New Era. The latter newspaper was the product of the 1951 merger of The DeKalb Times and The Collinsville New Era.

In 2008, of the 25 daily newspapers published in Alabama, the Times-Journal had the nineteenth highest daily circulation.

The Times-Journal won numerous awards from state newspaper associations, such as the Alabama Press Association and the Associated Press Managing Editors.

== Weekly Post ==
The Weekly Post was a weekly newspaper published in Rainsville, Alabama, by Southern Newspapers and serving the DeKalb County, Alabama region. It was founded in 1986 by Carey and Teri Baker. In 2010 the Times-Journal absorbed the smaller Weekly Post.
