= The Lufkin Daily News =

Newspaper in the city of Lufkin, Texas, United States

- The July 27, 2005 front page of The Lufkin Daily News
- Type: Daily newspaper
- Format: Broadsheet
- Owner: Southern Newspapers Inc.
- Publisher: Rhonda Overbey
- Editor: Josh Havard
- Founded: 1906
- Language: English
- Headquarters: 300 Ellis; Lufkin, TX 75904; United States
- Circulation: 3,825 (as of 2023)
- Website: LufkinDailyNews.com

The Lufkin Daily News is a newspaper in the city of Lufkin, Texas, United States.

== History ==
The Lufkin Daily News was the first daily newspaper in Lufkin, founded in 1906 by Charles L. Schless, who came to the city from Chicago to begin the afternoon publication. In 1909, he organized local stockholders to form a company and bought the Lufkin Tribune, a weekly in operation since 1887. Schless left Lufkin in 1912, and the company hired H.A. McKelvey to run the paper. McKelvey left the paper after a short time, with former Tribune chief George E. Watford returning to Lufkin in 1913 and buying the newspaper. He changed its publication schedule from daily to bi-weekly (Tuesday/Saturday), changed the name to The Lufkin News, and moved the newspaper offices to "Cotton Square" on Lufkin Avenue. W.C. Binion Sr. became a partner in the enterprise in 1914. The partners announced in April 1915 that circulation had doubled, and the newspaper began again publishing as an afternoon daily, The Lufkin Daily News, in November. The owners doubled their capital stock in 1920 and bought a new press.

In 1934, Lufkin business people J.H. Kurth, W.C. Trout, Mrs. S.W. Henderson Sr., and S.W. Henderson Jr. bought the paper. The new owners moved the newspaper from Cotton Square to new facilities on East Lufkin Avenue the next year. Co-editors C.S. Boyles Jr. and Jack McDermott introduced a Sunday edition that year, discontinuing the Saturday edition. Publisher W.R. "Beau" Beaumier took over the paper in 1943 after coming Lufkin two years earlier to head the local chamber of commerce. The paper changed its name to The Lufkin News after moving to a "spacious, modernistic" complex at Ellis and Herndon streets in 1959. The paper was sold to Waco-based chain Newspapers Inc. three years later by the Kurth, Trout, and Henderson families. Tom Meredith came from Waco to become publisher in 1965 after Beaumier's death, and Lufkin native Joe Murray was named editor in 1969, succeeding Bill Bogart. Murray would later become publisher/editor, restoring the name The Lufkin Daily News in 1982. The newspaper moved to cold type in 1974. Newspapers Inc. sold its holdings to Atlanta-based Cox Enterprises in 1976.

Bill E. Martin was hired as publisher in 1989, who named Phil Latham editor early in his tenure. After Cox moved Martin to the Longview News-Journal, Glenn McCutchen was named publisher in 1993. The newspaper changed to morning publication in 1996. Belinda Gaudet followed McCutchen as publisher in 1997 after he succeeded Martin in Longview. Longtime East Texas newsman Gary Borders was publisher from 2003 to 2007, then replaced by Tim Hobbs. Managing editor Andy Adams was promoted to editor in 2007.

In May 2009, Cox divested most of its newspaper holdings, selling The Lufkin Daily News and The Daily Sentinel of Nacogdoches to Houston-based publishing company Southern Newspapers Inc. Greg Shrader became publisher at that time. Janice "Neice" Bell followed Shrader as publisher in 2015, and Jenniffer Ricks became publisher exactly a year later. In the fall of 2019, Keven Todd came on board as president and publisher of the media company.

== Awards ==
The newspaper was awarded a Pulitzer Prize in 1977 for Public Service for an obituary of a local man who died in Marine training camp, which grew into an investigation of that death and a fundamental reform in the recruiting and training practices of the United States Marine Corps.
