= Brazosport Facts =

The Facts
- Type: Daily newspaper
- Format: Broadsheet
- Owner(s): Southern Newspapers Inc.
- Publisher: Yvonne Mintz
- Editor: Yvonne Mintz
- Managing editor: Michael Morris
- Founded: 1913
- Language: English
- Headquarters: 720. S. Main, Clute, Texas, 77531, United States
- Circulation: 7,874 (as of 2023)
- ISSN: 1065-7886
- Website: thefacts.com

The Brazosport Facts is the largest daily newspaper for Brazoria County, Texas, a part of the Greater Houston area. The newspaper is owned by Southern Newspapers Inc., and began in 1913.

== History ==
The paper was started by printer Roy Ruffin as the Freeport Facts months after the 1912 founding of Freeport, Texas by the Freeport Sulphur Company. One year later, the paper was acquired by C.P. Kendall, Sr. who also owned newspapers in Port Aransas, and the Angleton Times in Angleton.

A 1932 Freeport hurricane destroyed the Facts building and killed 40 people.

Separate area newspapers, the Brazoria County Review, Velasco World, and West Columbia Light were acquired by businessman W.D. Johnston. In 1949, he then merged the papers into The Daily Review.

In 1951, Southern Newspapers Inc. bought an interest in The Daily Review. The next year, it purchased the Freeport Facts. Merging the acquisitions into The Daily Facts-Review, Southern Newspapers later changed the name to Brazosport Facts. It eventually became the largest daily newspaper for the entire area.

In August 1976, the Facts moved its headquarters from Freeport to neighboring Clute, Texas where it remains today.

It absorbed employees from the competitor Angleton Times in 2004, along with the publication's reader list. The former Angleton Times office became the Angleton office of the Brazosport Facts. In 2004 The Facts had an Angleton circulation of 4,000 while the Angleton Times had 1,100 subscribers; there were 730 people/entities who/which subscribed to both newspapers.

The newspaper led the move to consolidate the town of Velasco into Freeport in 1957. The newspaper has also supported Brazosport College and its Brazosport Center for the Arts and Sciences.

== Awards ==
- 1982 Penney-Missouri Award General Excellence
