= The Victoria Advocate =

American daily newspaper

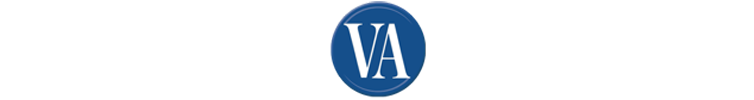
- Type: Daily newspaper
- Format: Broadsheet
- Owner: Carpenter Media Group
- General manager: Clarice Touhey
- Founded: 1846
- Headquarters: 101 W. Goodwin Ave., Suite 1200; Victoria, Texas 77901; United States
- Circulation: 12,804 (as of 2023)
- OCLC number: 1167990499
- Website: www.victoriaadvocate.com

The Victoria Advocate is a daily newspaper independently published in Victoria, Texas. It is the second-oldest paper in Texas and the oldest west of the Colorado River, dating back to May 8, 1846, following the Battle of Palo Alto during the Mexican War. The paper serves the communities of the Victoria metropolitan area.

== History ==
The paper was founded in 1846 by publishers John D. Logan and Thomas Sterne of Van Buren, Arkansas, as a weekly publication named the Texan Advocate. The two men had previously founded the Frontier Whig two years earlier, and like the Whig, the Advocate was associated with the Whig Party during its initial stages. Famed journalist John Henry Brown was briefly employed as an editor for the paper in its first year. After the publication was renamed the Texian Advocate, ownership changed hands several times during the 1850s.

In 1859, it was bought by Sam Addison White, who renamed the paper The Victoria Advocate and aligned it with the Democratic Party. Although the paper's ownership frequently changed in the next century, it remained supportive of the Democratic Party. As the city of Victoria grew in the latter part of the 19th century, the paper acted as a medium for citizens to voice their concerns for the changes. Under pressure, a daily format was released in 1897 by publisher James McDonald. He sold the paper to George Henry French in 1901, who remained for the next forty years. During that time, the paper prospered, increasing its size to about six to eight pages on average, and the circulation to 2,200 by 1942. Morris Roberts and a number of leading citizens purchased the paper in October 1942. In April 1961, Roberts purchased all stock and became sole owner of the Advocate. He shared ownership with his son, John M. Roberts, who serves as Chairman and daughter Catherine R. McHaney, who is secretary-treasurer.

Victoria Advocate Publishing Company began acquiring other papers in 2012 and changed its name to M. Roberts Media in 2015.

In July 2024, the newspaper announced it will switch from carrier to postal delivery.

In 2024, the paper's owner was acquired by Carpenter Media Group.
