= Bay City Tribune =

- Type: Biweekly newspaper
- Format: Broadsheet
- Owner: Southern Newspapers
- Editor: Kavan Van Hal
- General manager: Brittany Price
- Founded: 1845; 181 years ago
- Headquarters: 2901 Carey Smith Blvd., Bay City, 77414, United States
- Circulation: 2,087 (as of 2023)
- Website: baycitytribune.com

The Bay City Tribune is a newspaper based in Bay City, Texas, covering the Matagorda County area. It publishes twice a week, on Wednesday and Sunday. It is owned by Southern Newspapers.

== History ==
The Tribune is the second-oldest newspaper in Texas. Established on August 23, 1845, as a weekly, the newspaper moved from Matagorda to Bay City when the location of the county seat was changed in 1894.

It was published as both a daily and weekly from 1904 to 1959, when the weekly ceased publication. The newspaper converted to twice-weekly publication in 2002.

Carey Smith Sr. bought the Tribune in 1919 and owned it until his death in 1937. He was succeeded by son Carey Smith Jr., who led the paper until it was bought by Southern Newspapers in 1958. Southern president Glenn J. Sedam then became publisher, a position he held until 1981.
