= Seguin Gazette =

Texas Newspaper

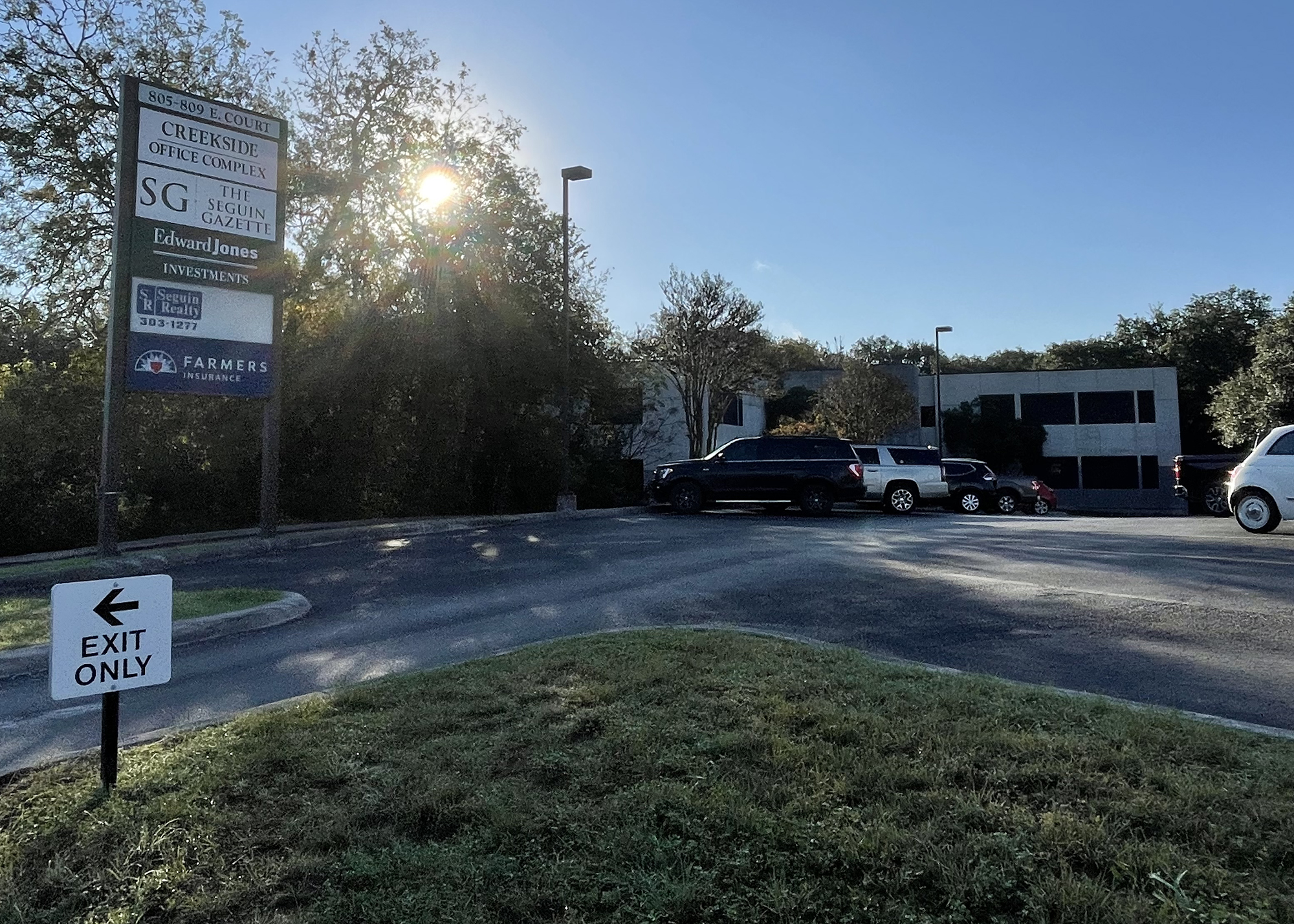
- The Seguin Gazette is now operating in the Creekside Office Complex, 805 E. Court St. Suite 200.
- Type: Daily newspaper
- Format: Broadsheet
- Owner: Southern Newspapers
- Publisher: Elizabeth Bark Englehardt
- Editor: Felicia Frazar
- Founded: 1888
- Headquarters: 805 E. Court St. Suite 200, Seguin, Texas, 78155, United States
- Circulation: 2,791 (as of 2023)
- Website: seguingazette.com

The Seguin Gazette is a newspaper based in Seguin, Texas, covering the Guadalupe County area of Central Texas. It publishes twice a week — Wednesdays and Sundays. It is owned by Southern Newspapers Inc.

== History ==
The Seguin Enterprise began publication in 1888 and the Guadalupe Gazette-Bulletin traces its origins to 1890. The Gazette-Bulletin changed its name to the Seguin Gazette in 1952. In 1979, publisher John C. Taylor of the Gazette and Enterprise publisher Otha L. Grisham agreed to a merger, but in effect, Taylor and the Gazette soon took over the operations and Grisham retired. The new combined daily newspaper was called Seguin Gazette-Enterprise.

Southern Newspapers bought the paper in 1984. In 1999, it moved from afternoon to morning publication. The newspaper changed its name to the Seguin Gazette in 2011.
