= New Braunfels Herald-Zeitung =

Coordinates: 29.7007°N 98.1441°W

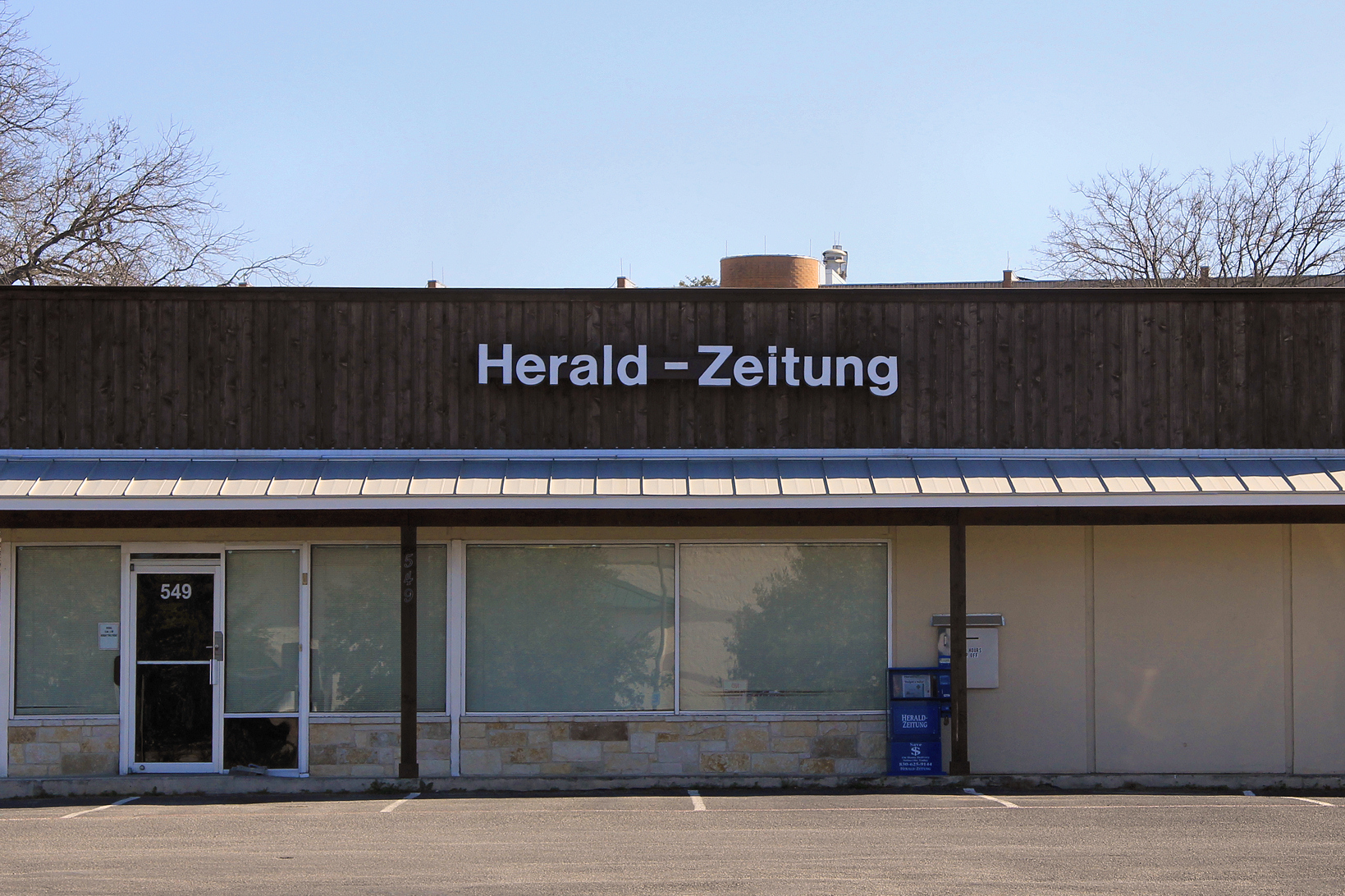
- Offices of the New Braunfels Herald-Zeitung
- Type: Daily newspaper
- Format: Broadsheet
- Owner: Southern Newspapers
- Publisher: Melania Bell
- Editor: Terry Cringle Jr.
- Founded: 1852
- Headquarters: 549 Landa St., New Braunfels, 78130, United States
- Circulation: 4,966 (as of 2023)
- Website: herald-zeitung.com

The New Braunfels Herald-Zeitung is a newspaper based in New Braunfels, Texas, covering the Comal County area of Central Texas. It publishes five days a week (excluding Sunday and Monday). It is owned by Southern Newspapers.

== History ==
Early Texas German settler and botanist Ferdinand Lindheimer was the first editor when the newspaper began as the weekly German-language publication Neu-Braunfelser Zeitung in 1852. The enterprise, begun to boost the reputation of the city and attract settlers, was backed by political activist Adolph Douai.

Subsequent editors throughout the 19th century included Anselm Eiband, Ernest Koebig and Ludolph LaFrentz. After the Zeitung Publishing Company formally organized to run the paper in the late 19th century, G.F. Oheim bought the property in 1899 and was editor/publisher until the time of his death in 1947.

Oheim's son, Frederic, succeeded him as owner/editor and added English-language content in 1948 in response to declining numbers of German-language subscribers. In 1954, the newspaper became the Zeitung-Chronicle after merging with the Comal County Chronicle.

The weekly English-language New Braunfels Herald (est. 1892), under the long-time leadership of Charles Scruggs, bought the Zeitung-Chronicle in 1957 and the German-language portion was dropped. The company continued to publish both newspapers separately once a week.

In 1967, the separate editions were dropped and the merged newspaper published as the English-only weekly Herald and Zeitung. The name was changed to Herald-Zeitung in 1979. Taylor Communications bought the newspaper in 1980, when it became a five-day daily. They sold the Herald-Zeitung to Southern Newspapers in 1984, and it became a morning newspaper in 1986.

Charles Scruggs' son, Claude, led the paper from the time of the merger until 1986. He was followed by Susan Haire and then editor/publisher David Sullens (1991–96). Under publisher Doug Toney (1996-2012), the Herald-Zeitung won over 100 statewide awards across all departments.

A serious flood damaged the company's offices, archives and Goss press in 1998, leading to a relocation of the printing facilities.

A Saturday edition was added in 2000.
