= Kerrville Daily Times =

The Kerrville Daily Times
- Type: Daily newspaper
- Format: Broadsheet
- Owner: Southern Newspapers Inc.
- Publisher: John Wells
- Editor: Jeanette Eastwood Nash
- Founded: 1926
- Language: English
- Headquarters: 301 Junction Highway, Suite 101; Kerrville, Texas, 78028; USA
- Circulation: 4,141 (as of 2023)
- OCLC number: 14366504
- Website: http://dailytimes.com

The Kerrville Daily Times, formerly the Kerrville Times and Centerpoint News, is a local and regional newspaper published in Kerrville, Texas, United States serving the hill country, Kerrville, and Kerr County. It was first published in 1926, although the original printing equipment had been used at a prior newspaper since 1908 and was later purchased in Centerpoint, Texas by the Starke family and moved to Kerrville to begin production of a regional newspaper in Kerr County. It currently serves as the newspaper of record for the City of Kerrville as well as Kerr County.

== History ==
- 1908 Centerpoint News is founded
- 1926 Printing equipment moved to Kerr County, changed name to "The Kerrville Times" publishing periodically
- 1949 Became daily newspaper, name changes to "The Kerrville Daily Times"
- 1976 Weekend edition begins print
- 2004 Sam P. Braswell, who spent much of his life working in the newspaper business and co–owned and operated the Kerrville Daily Times from 1948 to 1955, has died. He was 93.

== Today ==
In 2008 the Kerrville Daily Times celebrated their 100th anniversary, citing the original date of the Centerpoint newspaper, and announced a daily readership of 20,000. The Kerrville Daily Times also runs a website to complement their paper. The Kerrville Daily Times is owned by Southern Newspapers Inc.

== See also ==
- Kerrville, Texas
