= Somerville High School (Texas) =

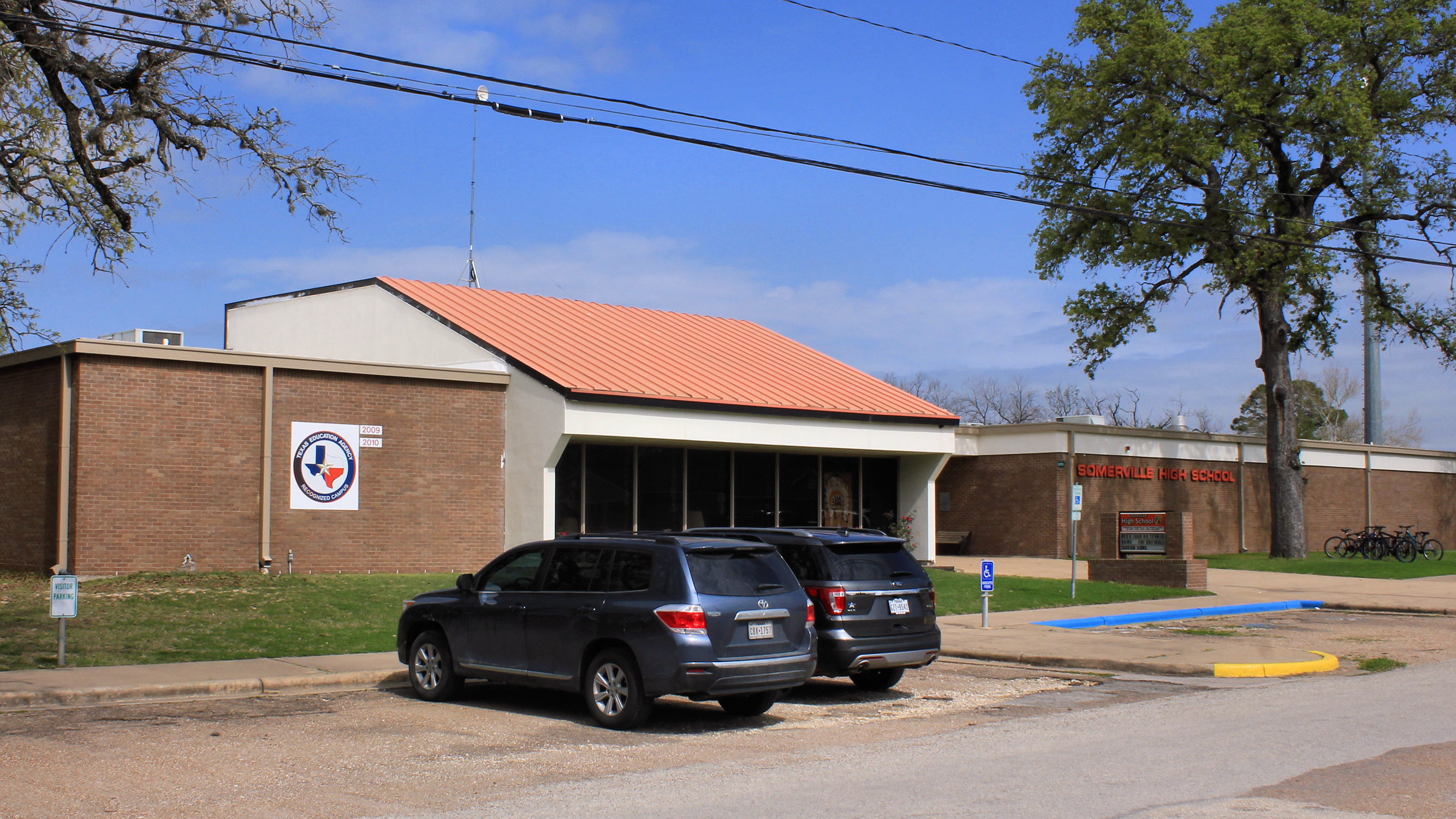

Location
- 570 8th Street; Somerville, Texas 77879; United States; 30.341933°N 96.534937°W

Information
- Type: Public high school
- School district: Somerville Independent School District
- Principal: Jennifer Wood
- Teaching staff: 20.92 (FTE)
- Grades: 7-12
- Enrollment: 199 (2023–2024)
- Student to teacher ratio: 9.51
- Colors: Orange and black
- Athletics conference: UIL Class 2A
- Team name: Yeguas
- Website: Official website

Somerville High School is a public high school located in Somerville, Texas (USA). It is the sole high school in the Somerville Independent School District and is classified as a 2A school by the UIL. For the 2024-2025 school year, the school was given a "D" by the Texas Education Agency.

== Athletics ==
The Somerville Yeguas compete in the following sports:

- Baseball
- Basketball
- Cross Country
- Football
- Golf
- Softball
- Tennis
- Track and Field
- Volleyball
