= GenealogyBank =

Online genealogical service

- Company type: Private
- Available in: English
- Founded: 2006
- Headquarters: Naples, Florida
- CEO: Dan Jones
- Industry: Family history website Genealogy research
- Products: Genealogybank.com
- Website: www.genealogybank.com
- Current status: Active

GenealogyBank.com is an online subscription genealogical service that provides access to records useful in family history research. GenealogyBank is one of the largest collections of digitized U.S. newspapers, dating back to 1690. In addition to digital newspaper archives, GenealogyBank also offers other online genealogy resources including the Social Security Death Index, obituaries, government publications, and historical books.

== History ==
GenealogyBank was founded in 2006, as a subsidiary of NewsBank offering a consumer product for family history researchers. Since 1972, NewsBank has served as a newspaper reference tool for libraries. GenealogyBank leverages NewsBank's existing newspaper reference tool into a web based searchable database for genealogists. Most of the records are unique to GenealogyBank and difficult to find on microfilm or in print today. In addition to the newspaper database, GenealogyBank also provides web access to other genealogy collections, which users can search simultaneously or individually.

== Record Collections ==
- Recent U.S. Obituaries (1977–present): Approximately over 130 million recent obituaries and death notices.
- Historical Books (1801-1900): Includes family genealogies, local histories, funeral sermons and biographies.
- Historical Documents (1789-1980): Military records, casualty lists, Revolutionary and Civil War pension requests, widow's claims, orphan petitions and land grants are in this collection. Also included is the U.S. Congressional Serial Set – 13,800 volumes of reports, documents, and journals from the U.S. Senate and House of Representatives from 1817 to 1980. Additionally, the American State Papers, legislative and executive documents from 1789 to 1838 are searchable.

In 2008, GenealogyBank added the Social Security Death Index (SSDI). Access to the SSDI is free and SSDI can also be found at other sites including FamilySearch and RootsWeb.

In 2015, over 450 additional historic newspaper titles were added to GenealogyBank's database, dating back to the 1700s and included millions of birth and marriage notices, and news stories.

GenealogyBank partnered with FamilySearch in 2015 to digitize thousands of newspaper obituaries. The database is updated constantly as soon as new records are available.

== Awards and recognition ==
- Family Tree magazine 101 Best Websites – 2013
- ProGenealogists - 50 Most Popular Genealogy Websites for 2011
