= The Daily News (Texas) =

Newspaper in Galveston, Texas

- Texas' Oldest Newspaper
- April 19, 1842, front page of The Daily News
- Type: Daily newspaper
- Format: Broadsheet
- Owner(s): Southern Newspapers Inc., Galveston Newspapers, Inc.
- Publisher: Michelle Robinson
- Editor: Michael A. Smith
- Managing editor: Laura Elder
- Photo editor: Jennifer Reynolds
- Founded: April 11, 1842
- Language: English
- Headquarters: 8522 Teichman Road; P.O. Box 628; Galveston, Texas, 77553; United States
- Circulation: 16,171 (as of 2023)
- OCLC number: 55942695
- Website: galvnews.com

The Daily News, formerly the Galveston County Daily News and Galveston Daily News, is a newspaper published in Galveston, Texas, United States. It was first published April 11, 1842, making it the oldest newspaper in the U.S. state of Texas. The newspaper founded The Dallas Morning News on October 1, 1885, as a sister publication. It currently serves as the newspaper of record for the City of Galveston as well as Galveston County.

== History ==
On April 11, 1842, George H. French began publication of the Daily News, as a single broadsheet paper. At the time, Texas was an independent Republic, with Sam Houston serving as president, and Galveston was its largest port and primary city. By 1843, Willard Richardson was named editor of the paper and in 1845 decided to purchase the growing publication. The News continued to grow and became a "major voice in the Republic of Texas", and was one of the first papers in the US with a dedicated train to manage its circulation in cities across the Republic and later the U.S. state of Texas.

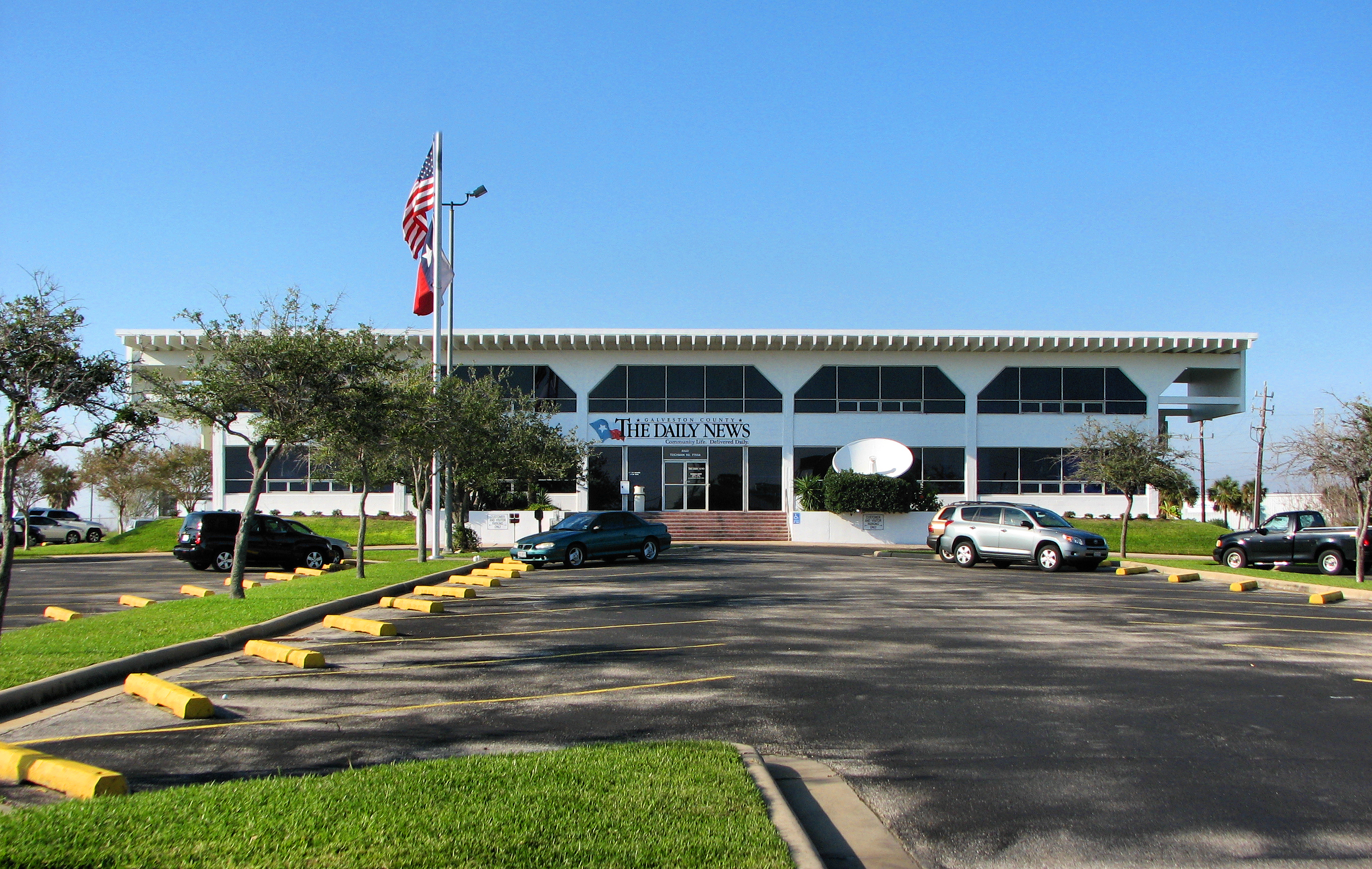
The Daily News main office in Galveston

During the Civil War, the Daily News was briefly published in Houston, after Galveston was occupied by Union forces, but it had returned by 1866.

Alfred Horatio Belo, joined the staff in 1865 and purchased the paper in 1875. By 1885, Belo saw the need for a strong independent publication in Dallas, and sent staff there to establish a satellite publication, The Dallas Morning News. In 1923, William Lewis Moody Jr., a prominent banker and insurance man purchased the paper from A. H. Belo. In 1963 the Moody Foundation chose to sell the paper to William P. Hobby Jr., owner of the Houston Post. The Hobbys, who also owned the competing Galveston Tribune, chose to discontinue that publication and convert the Daily News into a daily evening publication. In June 1967 Galveston Newspapers Inc., purchased the paper and changed The News to daily morning format.

On Sunday November 7, 2004, The Daily News absorbed the Texas City Sun, a smaller sister publication that had been founded in 1912 and was based in Texas City, Texas.

== Awards ==
The paper has won first place awards from the Associated Press and the Texas Press Association in editorial writing, headline writing and general excellence, as well as breaking news articles.

== Today ==
In November 2011 the paper dropped the "Galveston County" moniker and returned to its original name, The Daily News. It is currently published by Galveston Newspapers Inc., and owned by the Carmage B. Walls family. The Wallses also operate the Houston, Texas–based media group Southern Newspapers Inc.

It is Southern Newspapers' flagship publication and has a circulation of 33,000 in 2008. It has a weekday circulation of approximately 14,200 and a weekend circulation of approximately 14,900.

== See also ==
- List of newspapers in Texas
