= List of newspapers in Texas =

This is a list of newspapers in Texas, United States.

== Daily, weekly, and other newspapers ==
Newspapers listed in the 2023 Texas Newspaper Directory
| Title | City | Ownership | Year founded | Publication days | Circulation (2023) | Note |
|---|---|---|---|---|---|---|
| Abernathy Advocate | Abernathy | | 2017 | Friday | 298 | |
| Abilene Reporter-News | Abilene | USA Today Co. | 1881 | Daily (ex Sat) | 4,499 | |
| Albany News | Albany | | 1875 | Thursday | 849 | |
| The Community News | Aledo | | 1995 | Friday | 1,778 | |
| Alice Echo-News Journal | Alice | CherryRoad Media | 1894 | Sunday / Wednesday | 493 | |
| Alpine Avalanche | Alpine | | 1891 | Thursday | 2,047 | |
| Alvin Sun & Advertiser | Alvin | Times Media Group | 1892 | Sunday | 280 | |
| Amarillo Globe-News | Amarillo | USA Today Co. | 1926 | Daily (ex Sat) | 4,935 | |
| The Progress | Anahuac | Granite Media Partners | 1901 | Wednesday | 467 | |
| Andrews County News | Andrews | Scott Wood and Scott Wesner | 1934 | Sunday / Thursday | 884 | |
| Western Observer | Anson | | 1883 | Wednesday | 1,919 | |
| Aransas Pass Progress | Aransas Pass | Times Media Group | 1909 | Wednesday | 1,319 | |
| Archer County News | Archer City | | 1908 | Thursday | 922 | |
| Athens Daily Review | Athens | CNHI | 1901 | Tuesday / Thursday / Saturday | 1,578 | |
| Cass County Citizens Journal-Sun | Atlanta | Times Media Group | 1879 | Wednesday | 2,671 | |
| Austin American-Statesman | Austin | Hearst Communications | 1871 | Daily (ex Sat) | 28,987 | |
| Austin Business Journal | Austin | American City Business Journals | 1981 | Friday | 6,776 | |
| West Austin News | Austin | | 1986 | 2nd & 4th Thursday | 858 | |
| Azle News | Azle | Hyde Media Group, LLC | 1959 | Wednesday | 1,932 | |
| Baird Banner | Baird | Danny Tabor | 1997 | Wednesday | 310 | |
| Runnels County Register | Ballinger | CherryRoad Media | 1886 | Thursday | 991 | |
| Bandera Bulletin | Bandera | Granite Media Partners | 1945 | Wednesday | 1,466 | |
| Tribune Progress | Bartlett | | 1886 | Wednesday | 392 | |
| Bastrop Advertiser | Bastrop | USA Today Co. | 1853 | Wednesday / Friday | 601 | |
| The Bay City Tribune | Bay City | Southern Newspapers | 1845 | Sunday / Wednesday | 2,087 | |
| Baytown Sun | Baytown | Southern Newspapers | 1919 | Sunday / Tuesday / Thursday | 4,598 | |
| The Beaumont Enterprise | Beaumont | Hearst Communications | 1880 | Daily | 5,925 | |
| Beeville Bee-Picayune | Beeville | McElvy Media Group | 1886 | Thursday | 1,990 | |
| The Bellville Times | Bellville | | 1879 | Thursday | 2,901 | |
| The Belton Journal | Belton | David Tuma | 1866 | Thursday | 3,306 | |
| Big Lake Wildcat | Big Lake | Masked Rider Publishing, Inc. | 1925 | Thursday | 941 | |
| Big Sandy-Hawkins Journal | Big Sandy | | 1948 | Wednesday | 769 | |
| Big Spring Herald | Big Spring | Horizon Publications, Inc. | 1904 | Daily (ex Sat) | 1,401 | |
| Blanco County News | Blanco | Scott Wesner | 1883 | Wednesday | 1,228 | |
| Boerne Star | Boerne | Granite Media Partners | 1906 | Sun print / Wed digital replica | 2,770 | |
| Booker News | Booker | | 1927 | Thursday | 497 | |
| Borger News-Herald | Borger | Horizon Publications, Inc. | 1926 | Daily (ex Mon Sat) | 435 | |
| The Bowie News | Bowie | | 1922 | Wednesday / Saturday | 3,717 | |
| Kinney County Post | Brackettville | | 2010 | Thursday | 957 | |
| Brady Standard-Herald | Brady | | 1909 | Wednesday | 1,460 | |
| Breckenridge American | Breckenridge | Times Media Group | 1920 | Wednesday | 503 | |
| Brenham Banner-Press | Brenham | Hartman Newspapers, L.P. | 1866 | Sunday / Tuesday / Thursday | 3,121 | |
| Brownfield News | Brownfield | Scott Wood and Scott Wesner | 1904 | Sunday / Wednesday | 1,207 | |
| The Brownsville Herald | Brownsville | AIM Media Texas | 1892 | Daily | 6,283 | |
| Brownwood Bulletin | Brownwood | CherryRoad Media | 1900 | Sunday / Wednesday / Friday | 4,275 | |
| The Eagle | Bryan | Lee Enterprises | 1889 | Daily | 7,729 | |
| Buffalo Express | Buffalo | | 2000 | Wednesday | 1,252 | |
| Burkburnett Informer Star | Burkburnett | Daniel Walker | 1908 | Thursday | 845 | |
| Burnet Bulletin | Burnet | Times Media Group | 1873 | Wednesday | 4,412 | |
| Citizens Gazette | Burnet | | 1991 | Wednesday | 516 | |
| Burleson County Tribune | Caldwell | L.M. Preuss III | 1884 | Thursday | 2,688 | |
| The Cameron Herald | Cameron | Times Media Group | 1860 | Thursday | 1,290 | |
| The Canadian Record | Canadian | | 1893 | Thursday | 1,519 | |
| Canton Herald | Canton | Van Zandt Newspapers, LLC | 1882 | Thursday | 1,304 | |
| Van Zandt News | Canton | Van Zandt Newspapers, LLC | 1982 | Sunday | 1,752 | |
| The Canyon News | Canyon | Hearst Communications | 1896 | Sunday / Thursday | 652 | |
| Carrizo Springs Javelin | Carrizo Springs | | 1884 | Wednesday | 1,430 | |
| The Panola Watchman | Carthage | M. Roberts Media | 1873 | Sunday / Wednesday | 1,668 | |
| Hill Country News Weekender | Cedar Park | Fenice Community Media Group | 2000 | Thursday | 1,989 | |
| Celina Record | Celina | | 1902 | Sunday | 130 | |
| The Light and Champion | Center | Times Media Group | 1877 | Thursday | 1,164 | |
| Centerville News | Centerville | | 1980 | Wednesday | 1,306 | |
| The Red River Sun | Childress | Hicks Media Group | 2014 | Friday | 915 | |
| Clarendon Enterprise | Clarendon | | 1878 | Thursday | 747 | |
| The Claude News | Claude | | 1890 | Friday | 439 | |
| Cleburne Times-Review | Cleburne | CNHI | 1904 | Tuesday / Thursday / Saturday | 1,329 | |
| The Clifton Record | Clifton | Times Media Group | 1895 | Wednesday | 1,015 | |
| The Facts | Clute | Southern Newspapers | 1913 | Daily (ex Sun Mon) | 7,874 | |
| Clyde Journal | Clyde | Danny Tabor | 1972 | Wednesday | 1,000 | |
| Coleman Chronicle & Democrat-Voice | Coleman | Scott Wood | 1881 | Thursday | 1,188 | |
| Colorado City Record | Colorado City | | 1905 | Thursday | 2,049 | |
| Colorado County Citizen | Columbus | Granite Media Partners | 1857 | Wednesday | 2,219 | |
| The Banner Press Newspaper | Columbus | | 1985 | Thursday | 1,536 | |
| The Comanche Chief | Comanche | | 1873 | Thursday | 2,504 | |
| The Comfort News | Comfort | Bob Barton Jr. and Don Trepaignier | 1904 | Thursday | 1,050 | |
| The Courier | Conroe | Hearst Communications | 1892 | Daily | 2,560 | |
| Cooper Review | Cooper | Ashley Colvin | 1880 | Thursday | 806 | |
| Copperas Cove Leader-Press | Copperas Cove | David Tuma | 1894 | Tuesday / Friday | 3,280 | |
| Coastal Bend Legal & Business News | Corpus Christi | | 1981 | Daily (ex Sat Sun) | 87 | |
| Corpus Christi Caller-Times | Corpus Christi | USA Today Co. | 1883 | Daily (Ex Sat) | 6,878 | |
| Corsicana Daily Sun | Corsicana | CNHI | 1895 | Tuesday / Saturday | 1,606 | |
| Crane News | Crane | | 1879 | Thursday | 900 | |
| Houston County Courier | Crockett | Polk County Publishing | 1890 | Thursday | 3,563 | |
| Cross Plains Review | Cross Plains | | 1908 | Thursday | 770 | |
| Foard County News | Crowell | | 1891 | Thursday | 433 | |
| Zavala County Sentinel | Crystal City | Annie Lee Amescua, Nelly Fernandez, Juan Fernandez | 1911 | Wednesday | 1,651 | |
| The Cuero Record | Cuero | Times Media Group | 1894 | Wednesday | 1,769 | |
| The Dalhart Texan | Dalhart | Scott Wood and Scott Wesner | 1901 | Tuesday / Friday | 1,166 | |
| Daily Commercial Record | Dallas | E. Nuel Cates Jr. | 1888 | Daily (ex Sun Sat) | 135 | |
| Dallas Business Journal | Dallas | American City Business Journals | 1977 | Friday | 7,849 | |
| The Dallas Examiner | Dallas | | 1986 | Thursday | 5,000 | |
| Texas Jewish Post | Dallas | | 1947 | Thursday | 2,279 | |
| The Dallas Morning News | Dallas | Hearst Communications | 1885 | Daily | 137,262 | |
| De Leon Free Press | De Leon | | 1890 | Thursday | 978 | |
| Wise County Messenger | Decatur | | 1880 | Wednesday / Friday | 4,130 | |
| Denton Record-Chronicle | Denton | Denton Media Company | 1903 | Daily eEdition / print Saturday | 3,780 | |
| Denver City Press | Denver City | | 1939 | Thursday | 997 | |
| Focus Daily News | DeSoto | Focus Newspapers of DFW | 1987 | Daily (ex Mon Sat) | 14,996 | |
| The Devine News | Devine | | 1897 | Wednesday | 2,475 | |
| The Free Press | Diboll | Hicks Media Group | 1952 | Thursday | 339 | |
| The Castro County News | Dimmitt | Brett Wesner | 1924 | Thursday | 797 | |
| News-Dispatch | Dripping Springs | Something More Media | 1981 | Thursday | 877 | |
| The Dublin Citizen | Dublin | Brett Wesner | 1990 | Thursday | 1,265 | |
| Moore County News-Press | Dumas | | 1927 | Sunday / Thursday | 2,705 | |
| Eastland County Today | Eastland | | 1925 | Thursday | 1,275 | |
| Eden Echo | Eden | | 1906 | Thursday | 231 | |
| Jackson County Herald-Tribune | Edna | Times Media Group | 1906 | Wednesday | 1,613 | |
| El Campo Leader-News | El Campo | Hartman Newspapers, L.P. | 1885 | Wednesday / Saturday | 2,635 | |
| Eldorado Success | Eldorado | Masked Rider Publishing, Inc. | 1901 | Thursday | 957 | |
| Electra Star-News | Electra | | 1907 | Thursday | 870 | |
| Elgin Courier | Elgin | Granite Media Partners | 1890 | Wednesday | 1,743 | |
| El Paso Times | El Paso | USA Today Co. | 1881 | Daily (ex Sat) | 9,625 | |
| Rains County Leader | Emory | | 1887 | Thursday | 1,424 | |
| The Ennis News | Ennis | Fackelman Newspaper Group | 1891 | Sunday | 2,056 | |
| Freestone County Times | Fairfield | | 2002 | Wednesday | 2,132 | |
| Freestone County Recorder-Chronicle | Fairfield | Times Media Group | 2026 | Thursday | 1,161 | Formed by merger of Fairfield Recorder and Teague Chronicle |
| Falfurrias Facts | Falfurrias | | 1906 | Thursday | 1,966 | |
| The Farmersville Times | Farmersville | C&S Media, Inc. | 1885 | Thursday | 1,273 | |
| State Line Tribune | Farwell | | 1911 | Thursday | 1,161 | |
| The Ellis County Press | Ferris | | 1992 | Thursday | 2,096 | |
| The Flatonia Argus | Flatonia | | 1877 | Thursday | 897 | |
| Wilson County News | Floresville | WCN, Inc. | 1973 | Wednesday | 5,332 | |
| Floyd County Hesperian-Beacon | Floydada | Paragraph Ranch, LLC | 1896 | Thursday | 1,110 | |
| Forney Messenger | Forney | | 1896 | Thursday | 2,083 | |
| Jeff Davis County Mountain Dispatch | Fort Davis | | 1983 | Thursday | 1,177 | |
| Hudspeth County Herald | Fort Hancock | | 1956 | Friday | 346 | |
| Fort Stockton Pioneer | Fort Stockton | Granite Media Partners | 1908 | Thursday | 1,293 | |
| Commercial Recorder | Fort Worth | | 1903 | Daily (ex Sat Sun) | 230 | |
| Fort Worth Business Press | Fort Worth | | 1988 | Monday bi-weekly | 2,117 | |
| Fort Worth Star-Telegram | Fort Worth | McClatchy | 1906 | Daily (ex Sat) | 43,342 | |
| Tarrant County Commercial Record | Fort Worth | E. Nuel Cates Jr. | 2016 | Tuesday / Thursday | 12 | |
| Franklin News Weekly | Franklin | | 1970 | Thursday | 645 | |
| Fredericksburg Standard-Radio Post | Fredericksburg | Times Media Group | 1907 | Wednesday | 5,850 | |
| Friendswood Reporter News | Friendswood | Jim Foreman | 1971 | Wednesday | 1,352 | |
| Friona Star | Friona | | 1925 | Thursday | 726 | |
| The Eagle Press | Fritch | | 1988 | Friday | 940 | |
| Borden Star | Gail | | 1972 | Wednesday | 286 | |
| Gainesville Daily Register | Gainesville | CNHI | 1890 | Tuesday / Friday | 1,108 | |
| The Daily News | Galveston | Southern Newspapers | 1842 | Daily (ex Sun Mon) | 16,171 | |
| Gatesville Messenger | Gatesville | Hyde Media Group, LLC | 1881 | Wednesday / Saturday | 2,351 | |
| Sunday Sun | Georgetown | Sun Publishing Co., Inc. | 1974 | Sunday | 6,263 | |
| Williamson County Sun | Georgetown | Sun Publishing Co., Inc. | 1877 | Wednesday | 6,271 | |
| Giddings Times & News | Giddings | L.M. Preuss III | 1888 | Thursday | 4,593 | |
| Gilmer Mirror | Gilmer | | 1877 | Thursday | 1,483 | |
| Gladewater Mirror | Gladewater | Bardwell Ink, LLC | 1928 | Wednesday | 467 | |
| Glen Rose Reporter | Glen Rose | CherryRoad Media | 1887 | Friday | 937 | |
| Goldthwaite Eagle | Goldthwaite | | 1894 | Wednesday | 1,702 | |
| Goliad Advance-Guard | Goliad | McElvy Media Group | 1854 | Thursday | 789 | |
| Gonzales Inquirer | Gonzales | Fenice Community Media Group | 1853 | Thursday | 1,758 | |
| The Graham Leader | Graham | Times Media Group | 1876 | Saturday | 1,452 | |
| Hood County News | Granbury | Hyde Media Group, LLC | 1886 | Wednesday / Saturday | 5,580 | |
| Grand Saline Sun | Grand Saline | | 1894 | Thursday | 350 | |
| The Messenger | Grapeland | | 1899 | Sunday / Thursday | 2,204 | |
| Herald-Banner | Greenville | CNHI | 1869 | Tuesday / Thursday / Saturday | 1,845 | |
| Groesbeck Journal | Groesbeck | Times Media Group | 1892 | Thursday | 1,550 | |
| The Groom News | Groom | | 1925 | Thursday | 515 | |
| Trinity County News-Standard | Groveton | Polk County Publishing | 1928 | Thursday | 1,644 | |
| Hallettsville Tribune-Herald | Hallettsville | L.M. Preuss III | 1875 | Wednesday | 2,484 | |
| Hamilton Herald-News | Hamilton | | 1875 | Thursday | 1,403 | |
| The Hamlin Herald | Hamlin | | 1905 | Thursday | 1,137 | |
| Valley Morning Star | Harlingen | AIM Media Texas | 1911 | Daily | 6,510 | |
| Robertson County News | Hearne | | 1889 | Thursday | 3,392 | |
| The Enterprise | Hebbronville | | 1926 | Wednesday | 870 | |
| Sabine County Reporter | Hemphill | | 1883 | Wednesday | 1,438 | |
| Waller County Express | Hempstead | | 2019 | Tuesday | 1,829 | |
| The Henderson News | Henderson | Hartman Newspapers, L.P. | 1930 | Sunday / Wednesday | 2,106 | |
| Clay County Leader | Henrietta | Daniel Walker | 1932 | Thursday | 984 | |
| Hereford Brand | Hereford | Blackmon Publishing | 1901 | Wednesday / Saturday | 1,195 | |
| Hico News Review | Hico | | 1895 | Thursday | 902 | |
| Highlands Star / Crosby Courier | Highlands | | 1955 | Thursday | 3,100 | |
| Hillsboro Reporter | Hillsboro | | 1963 | Monday / Thursday | 2,665 | |
| Hondo Anvil Herald | Hondo | | 1886 | Thursday | 3,051 | |
| Daily Court Review | Houston | | 1889 | Daily (ex Sat Sun) | 2,125 | |
| Houston Business Journal | Houston | American City Business Journals | 1971 | Friday | 9,414 | |
| Houston Chronicle | Houston | Hearst Communications | 1901 | Daily | 142,785 | |
| Jewish Herald-Voice | Houston | Jeanne F. Samuels, Vicki Samuels Lev and Matt Samuels | 1908 | Thursday | 3,296 | |
| The Huntsville Item | Huntsville | CNHI | 1850 | Tuesday / Thursday / Saturday | 1,313 | |
| Idalou Beacon | Idalou | | 1952 | Friday | 447 | |
| Ingleside Index | Ingleside | Times Media Group | 1953 | Wednesday | 632 | |
| West Kerr Current | Ingram | | 2003 | Thursday | 1,132 | |
| The Irving Rambler | Irving | | 2003 | Saturday | 2,592 | |
| Jacksboro Herald-Gazette | Jacksboro | Times Media Group | 1880 | Wednesday | 626 | |
| Jacksonville Progress | Jacksonville | CNHI | 1910 | Tuesday / Saturday | 1,067 | |
| The Jasper Newsboy | Jasper | Hearst Communications | 1865 | Wednesday | 570 | |
| Jefferson Jimplecute | Jefferson | Marion County Media | 1848 | Friday | 714 | |
| Johnson City Record-Courier | Johnson City | Scott Wesner | 1880 | Wednesday | 751 | |
| Junction Eagle | Junction | | 1882 | Wednesday | 1,243 | |
| The Karnes Countywide | Karnes City | McElvy Media Group | 1891 | Wednesday | 1,361 | |
| Katy Times | Katy | Fenice Community Media Group | 1912 | Thursday | 1,525 | |
| The Kaufman Herald | Kaufman | Hartman Newspapers, L.P. | 1886 | Thursday | 2,423 | |
| Hill Country Community Journal | Kerrville | | 2005 | Wednesday | 3,187 | |
| Kerrville Daily Times | Kerrville | Southern Newspapers | 1910 | Tuesday / Thursday / Saturday | 4,141 | |
| Kilgore News Herald | Kilgore | M. Roberts Media | 1930 | Wed online / Sat print | 1,077 | |
| Killeen Daily Herald | Killeen | Frank Mayborn Enterprises | 1890 | Daily | 5,681 | |
| Kingsville Record | Kingsville | | 1906 | Thursday | 1,816 | |
| The East Texas Banner | Kirbyville | | 1906 | Wednesday | 1,090 | |
| Hays Free Press | Kyle | Something More Media | 1903 | Wednesday | 1,978 | |
| The Fayette County Record | La Grange | | 1922 | Tuesday / Friday | 5,098 | |
| Bay Area Observer | La Porte | | 2009 | Thursday | 1,203 | |
| La Vernia News | La Vernia | WCN, Inc. | 1969 | Thursday | 790 | |
| Lake Travis View | Lakeway | USA Today Co. | 1986 | Wednesday | 633 | |
| Lamesa Press Reporter | Lamesa | Scott Wood and Scott Wesner | 1905 | Sunday / Wednesday | 1,715 | |
| Lampasas Dispatch Record | Lampasas | | 1906 | Tuesday / Friday | 2,252 | |
| Laredo Morning Times | Laredo | Hearst Communications | 1881 | Daily | 5,034 | |
| The Leonard Graphic | Leonard | | 1890 | Thursday | 710 | |
| Levelland & Hockley County News-Press | Levelland | Brett Wesner | 1928 | Sunday / Wednesday | 3,428 | |
| Lexington Leader | Lexington | | 1997 | Thursday | 1,200 | |
| The Vindicator | Liberty | Granite Media Partners | 1887 | Thursday | 1,743 | |
| Lindale News | Lindale | Rambler Texas Media | 1900 | Thursday | 791 | |
| Lindsay Letter | Lindsay | Scott Wood | 2007 | Friday | 410 | |
| The Lamb County Leader-News | Littlefield | Brett Wesner | 1918 | Sunday / Wednesday | 1,351 | |
| Polk County Enterprise | Livingston | Polk County Publishing | 1904 | Sunday / Thursday | 4,725 | |
| The Llano News | Llano | Scott Wesner | 1889 | Wednesday | 1,546 | |
| Lockhart Post-Register | Lockhart | | 1872 | Thursday | 2,008 | |
| Longview News-Journal | Longview | M. Roberts Media | 1871 | Online daily / print Wed / Fri / Sun | 9,512 | |
| Lubbock Avalanche-Journal | Lubbock | USA Today Co. | 1900 | Daily (ex Sat) | 7,260 | |
| Lufkin Daily News | Lufkin | Southern Newspapers | 1907 | Wednesday / Friday / Saturday | 3,825 | |
| Luling Newsboy and Signal | Luling | L.M. Preuss III | 1878 | Thursday | 783 | |
| The Monitor | Mabank | Van Zandt Newspapers, LLC | 1974 | Sunday / Thursday | 1,579 | |
| Madisonville Meteor | Madisonville | Granite Media Partners | 1894 | Wednesday | 1,028 | |
| The Highlander | Marble Falls | Times Media Group | 1959 | Friday | 5,048 | |
| The Big Bend Sentinel | Marfa | West Texan Media Group | 1926 | Thursday | 2,753 | |
| The Marlin Democrat | Marlin | MTimes Media Group | 1890 | Wednesday | 624 | |
| Marshall News Messenger | Marshall | M. Roberts Media | 1877 | Online daily / print Wed / Fri / Sun | 2,837 | |
| Mason County News | Mason | Scott Wesner | 1877 | Wednesday | 1,847 | |
| The Monitor | McAllen | AIM Media Texas | 1909 | Daily | 13,607 | |
| McGregor Mirror & Crawford Sun | McGregor | | 1892 | Thursday | 772 | |
| Collin County Commercial Record | McKinney | E. Nuel Cates Jr. | 1982 | Tuesday / Thursday | 40 | |
| Menard News and Messenger | Menard | | 1936 | Thursday | 800 | |
| The Mercedes Enterprise | Mercedes | | 1908 | Wednesday | 1,945 | |
| Meridian Tribune | Meridian | Times Media Group | 1893 | Wednesday | 574 | |
| The Mexia News | Mexia | Times Media Group | 1899 | Wednesday / Saturday | 1,360 | |
| The Miami Chief | Miami | | 1899 | Thursday | 359 | |
| Midland Reporter-Telegram | Midland | Hearst Communications | 1929 | Daily (ex Sun Mon) | 8,707 | |
| Greenwood Ranger | Midland | David Butler | 2022 | Thursday | 400 | |
| Midlothian Mirror | Midlothian | CherryRoad Media | 1882 | Thursday | 426 | |
| Miles Messenger | Miles | Donna Glass | 1903 | Thursday | 387 | |
| Wood County Monitor | Mineola | Phil and Lesa Major | 1876 | Thursday | 1,477 | |
| Palo Pinto Press | Mineral Wells | CherryRoad Media | 2022 | Friday | 750 | |
| Progress Times | Mission | | 1972 | Friday | 3,605 | |
| The Monahans News | Monahans | Smokey and Laura Briggs | 1931 | Thursday | 1,970 | |
| Moulton Eagle | Moulton | L.M. Preuss III | 1914 | Thursday | 480 | |
| Mount Pleasant Tribune | Mount Pleasant | Times Media Group | 1873 | Wednesday | 1,528 | |
| Muenster Enterprise | Muenster | Scott Wood | 1936 | Friday | 1,050 | |
| Muleshoe Journal | Muleshoe | Hearst Communications | 1919 | Thursday | 360 | |
| The Knox County News-Courier | Munday | Hicks Media Group | 1971 | Friday | 297 | |
| Murphy Monitor | Murphy | C&S Media, Inc. | 2005 | Thursday | 707 | |
| The Daily Sentinel | Nacogdoches | Southern Newspapers | 1899 | Wednesday / Saturday | 2,622 | |
| The Monitor | Naples | | 1886 | Thursday | 958 | |
| Navasota Examiner | Navasota | Granite Media Partners | 1894 | Wednesday | 3,254 | |
| Hometown Journal | Needville | | 1962 | Wednesday | 700 | |
| Bowie County Citizens Tribune | New Boston | Times Media Group | 1885 | Wednesday | 1,421 | |
| New Braunfels Herald-Zeitung | New Braunfels | Southern Newspapers | 1852 | Daily (ex Sun Mon) | 4,966 | |
| New Ulm Enterprise | New Ulm | | 1910 | Thursday | 854 | |
| Newton County News | Newton | | 1884 | Wednesday | 1,155 | |
| Nocona News | Nocona | | 1905 | Thursday | 1,438 | |
| The Normangee Star | Normangee | | 1912 | Wednesday | 1,075 | |
| O’Donnell Index-Press | O'Donnell | | 1923 | Wednesday | 219 | |
| Odessa American | Odessa | AIM Media Texas | 1940 | Daily eEdition; print Sun / Wed | 4,182 | |
| Olney Enterprise | Olney | | 1908 | Thursday | 703 | |
| The Orange Leader | Orange | Boone Newspapers | 1875 | Wednesday / Saturday | 931 | |
| Ozona Stockman | Ozona | | 1913 | Wednesday | 720 | |
| Paducah Post | Paducah | | 1906 | Monday | 300 | |
| The Concho Herald | Paint Rock | Donna Glass | 1890 | Thursday | 64 | |
| Palacios Beacon | Palacios | | 1907 | Wednesday | 1,490 | |
| Palestine Herald-Press | Palestine | CNHI | 1849 | Tuesday / Thursday / Saturday | 1,880 | |
| The Pampa News | Pampa | | 1906 | Tuesday / Thursday / Saturday | 1,934 | |
| Panhandle Herald/White Deer News | Panhandle | | 1887 | Thursday | 885 | |
| The Paris News | Paris | Southern Newspapers | 1869 | Sunday / Tuesday / Thursday | 3,032 | |
| Pearland Reporter News | Pearland | Jim Foreman | 1971 | Wednesday | 1,349 | |
| Frio-Nueces Current | Pearsall | Craig Garnett | 1896 | Thursday | 1,877 | |
| Pecos Enterprise | Pecos | Smokey and Laura Briggs | 1887 | Thursday | 1,876 | |
| Perryton Herald | Perryton | | 1917 | Thursday | 2,400 | |
| The Advance News Journal | Pharr | | 1978 | Wednesday | 3,695 | |
| Pilot Point Post-Signal | Pilot Point | Lewis Newspapers, Inc. | 1878 | Friday | 1,700 | |
| Plainview Herald | Plainview | Hearst Communications | 1889 | Wednesday / Friday / Saturday | 1,289 | |
| Pleasanton Express | Pleasanton | | 1909 | Wednesday | 4,275 | |
| Port Aransas South Jetty | Port Aransas | | 1971 | Thursday | 3,636 | |
| The Port Arthur News | Port Arthur | Boone Newspapers | 1897 | Wednesday / Friday / Saturday | 2,529 | |
| Port Isabel / South Padre Press | Port Isabel | Fackelman Newspaper Group | 1952 | Thursday | 1,154 | |
| Port Lavaca Wave | Port Lavaca | Something More Media | 1890 | Wednesday | 2,096 | |
| The News of San Patricio | Portland | McElvy Media Group | 1908 | Thursday | 1,109 | |
| The Post Dispatch | Post | Hicks Media Group | 1926 | Friday | 303 | |
| The International | Presidio | West Texan Media Group | 1986 | Thursday | 564 | |
| The Princeton Herald | Princeton | C&S Media, Inc. | 1970 | Thursday | 1,258 | |
| Quanah Tribune-Chief | Quanah | | 1889 | Friday | 507 | |
| Valley Tribune | Quitaque | | 1926 | Wednesday | 688 | |
| Crosby County News | Ralls | | 1985 | Friday | 501 | |
| Raymondville Chronicle & Willacy Co. News | Raymondville | | 1920 | Wednesday | 2,337 | |
| Refugio County Press | Refugio | McElvy Media Group | 1959 | Thursday | 591 | |
| Riesel Rustler | Riesel | | 1896 | Friday | 239 | |
| Observer/Enterprise | Robert Lee | | 1898 | Friday | 1,391 | |
| Rockdale Reporter | Rockdale | | 1873 | Thursday | 2,721 | |
| The Rockport Pilot | Rockport | Hartman Newspapers, L.P. | 1869 | Wednesday / Saturday | 2,610 | |
| Fort Bend Herald | Rosenberg | Hartman Newspapers, L.P. | 1888 | Sunday / Tuesday / Thursday | 3,366 | |
| Double Mountain Chronicle | Rotan | | 1907 | Friday | 1,241 | |
| Round Rock Leader | Round Rock | USA Today Co. | 1877 | Wednesday and Friday | 25 | |
| The Rowena Press | Rowena | Donna Glass | 1936 | Thursday | 38 | |
| Roxton Progress | Roxton | | 1976 | 1st & 3rd Thursdays | 337 | |
| Royse City Herald Banner | Royse City | CNHI | 2002 | Thursday | 162 | |
| Cherokeean Herald | Rusk | | 1850 | Wednesday | 1,321 | |
| The Sachse News | Sachse | C&S Media, Inc. | 2005 | Thursday | 1,051 | |
| The Saint Jo Tribune | Saint Jo | | 1898 | Friday | 442 | |
| Salado Village Voice | Salado | | 1979 | Thursday | 1,237 | |
| San Angelo Standard-Times | San Angelo | USA Today Co. | 1884 | Daily (ex Sat) | 4,143 | |
| Hart Beat | San Antonio | | 2008 | Monday / Wednesday / Friday | 356 | |
| San Antonio Business Journal | San Antonio | American City Business Journals | 1987 | Friday | 4,058 | |
| San Antonio Express-News | San Antonio | Hearst Communications | 1865 | Daily | 58,624 | |
| San Augustine Tribune | San Augustine | | 1916 | Thursday | 1,945 | |
| San Benito News | San Benito | Fackelman Newspaper Group | 1929 | Friday | 919 | |
| San Marcos Daily Record | San Marcos | Times Media Group | 1912 | Sunday / Wednesday | 2,824 | |
| San Saba News & Star | San Saba | Brett Wesner | 1873 | Thursday | 1,328 | |
| Schulenburg Sticker | Schulenburg | | 1894 | Thursday | 1,795 | |
| The Sealy News | Sealy | Granite Media Partners | 1887 | Thursday | 1,234 | |
| Seguin Gazette | Seguin | Southern Newspapers | 1888 | Sunday / Wednesday | 2,791 | |
| Seminole Sentinel | Seminole | Scott Wood and Scott Wesner | 1907 | Sunday / Wednesday | 1,316 | |
| Baylor County Banner | Seymour | | 1895 | Thursday | 893 | |
| County Star-News | Shamrock | Blackmon Publishing | 1993 | Thursday | 1,545 | |
| San Jacinto News-Times | Shepherd | Polk County Publishing | 1904 | Thursday | 1,185 | |
| Herald Democrat | Sherman | CherryRoad Media | 1879 | Daily (ex Mon Sat) | 4,518 | |
| The Shiner Gazette | Shiner | L.M. Preuss III | 1892 | Thursday | 1,492 | |
| The Bee | Silsbee | Hicks Media Group | 1919 | Wednesday | 1,064 | |
| Caprock Courier | Silverton | Paragraph Ranch, LLC | 2010 | Thursday | 985 | |
| The Slatonite | Slaton | Scott Wood and Scott Wesner | 1911 | Thursday | 1,379 | |
| Smithville Times | Smithville | USA Today Co. | 1895 | Wednesday | 217 | |
| The Snyder News | Snyder | Scott Wood and Scott Wesner | 1950 | Wednesday / Saturday | 2,541 | |
| Devil’s River News | Sonora | Masked Rider Publishing, Inc. | 1890 | Thursday | 900 | |
| The Hansford County Reporter-Statesman | Spearman | | 1907 | Thursday | 742 | |
| Springtown Epigraph | Springtown | Hyde Media Group, LLC | 1964 | Thursday | 906 | |
| The Texas Spur | Spur | Paragraph Ranch, LLC | 1909 | Thursday | 1,102 | |
| Stamford American | Stamford | Callie Lovvorn | 1900 | Monday | 212 | |
| The Stamford Star | Stamford | | 2006 | Friday | 1,386 | |
| Martin County Messenger | Stanton | David Butler | 1925 | Thursday | 806 | |
| Stephenville Empire-Tribune | Stephenville | CherryRoad Media | 1871 | Wednesday / Saturday | 2,163 | |
| Sherman County Gazette | Stratford | | 2021 | Thursday | 177 | |
| Sulphur Springs News-Telegram | Sulphur Springs | Times Media Group | 1899 | Wednesday | 2,945 | |
| Sweetwater Reporter | Sweetwater | Horizon Publications, Inc. | 1881 | Tuesday / Thursday / Saturday | 735 | |
| Lynn County News | Tahoka | | 1903 | Thursday | 543 | |
| Taylor Press | Taylor | Granite Media Partners | 1913 | Sunday / Wednesday | 1,457 | |
| Temple Daily Telegram | Temple | Frank Mayborn Enterprises | 1907 | Daily | 7,850 | |
| The Terrell Tribune | Terrell | Van Zandt Newspapers, LLC | 1898 | Saturday | 791 | |
| Texarkana Gazette | Texarkana | WEHCO Media | 1875 | Daily | 2,476 | |
| The Post Newspaper | Texas City | | 2002 | Sunday / Wednesday | 843 | |
| The Progress | Three Rivers | McElvy Media Group | 1928 | Thursday | 867 | |
| Throckmorton Tribune | Throckmorton | Callie Lovvorn | 1886 | Monday | 198 | |
| Swisher County News | Tulia | Blackmon Publishing | 2009 | Thursday | 865 | |
| Tyler Morning Telegraph | Tyler | M. Roberts Media | 1877 | Online daily / print Wed / Fri / Sun | 8,055 | |
| Uvalde Leader-News | Uvalde | Craig Garnett | 1879 | Sunday / Thursday | 3,472 | |
| Valley Mills Progress | Valley Mills | | 1989 | 2nd & 4th Wednesday | 580 | |
| Van Alstyne Leader | Van Alstyne | CherryRoad Media | 1892 | Friday | 315 | |
| The Van Horn Advocate | Van Horn | | 1910 | Thursday | 81 | |
| Vega Enterprise | Vega | | 1948 | Thursday | 690 | |
| Vernon Daily Record | Vernon | Daniel Walker | 1908 | Wednesday | 1,094 | |
| Victoria Advocate | Victoria | M. Roberts Media | 1846 | Online daily / print Wed / Fri / Sun | 12,804 | |
| Vidor Vidorian | Vidor | | 1959 | Wednesday | 1,531 | |
| Waco Tribune-Herald | Waco | Lee Enterprises | 1892 | Daily | 12,621 | |
| The Waxahachie Sun | Waxahachie | | 2018 | Sunday / Wednesday | 1,105 | |
| Waxahachie Daily Light | Waxahachie | CherryRoad Media | 1867 | Wednesday / Saturday | 1,141 | |
| Weatherford Democrat | Weatherford | CNHI | 1895 | Tuesday / Saturday | 1,463 | |
| Weimar Mercury | Weimar | | 1888 | Thursday | 1,212 | |
| The West News | West | | 1889 | Thursday | 1,755 | |
| Wharton Journal-Spectator | Wharton | Hartman Newspapers, L.P. | 1889 | Wednesday / Saturday | 2,108 | |
| The Wheeler Times | Wheeler | | 1933 | Thursday | 592 | |
| White Oak Independent | White Oak | Bardwell Ink, LLC | 1990 | Thursday | 163 | |
| Whitesboro News-Record | Whitesboro | | 1877 | Friday | 1,110 | |
| The Whitewright Sun | Whitewright | | 1884 | Thursday | 543 | |
| Times Record News | Wichita Falls | USA Today Co. | 1907 | Daily (ex Sat) | 4,779 | |
| Wills Point Chronicle | Wills Point | Van Zandt Newspapers, LLC | 1879 | Friday | 703 | |
| Wimberley View | Wimberley | Times Media Group | 1976 | Thursday | 2,110 | |
| The Hometown Press | Winnie | | 1991 | Wednesday | 1,355 | |
| The Seabreeze Beacon | Winnie | | 2015 | Tuesday | 812 | |
| Winnsboro News | Winnsboro | Scott Wood | 1908 | Thursday | 1,383 | |
| Tyler County Booster | Woodville | Polk County Publishing | 1930 | Thursday | 3,426 | |
| The Wylie News | Wylie | C&S Media, Inc. | 1948 | Wednesday | 2,645 | |
| Yoakum Herald-Times | Yoakum | L.M. Preuss III | 1892 | Wednesday | 1,138 | |
| Zapata County News | Zapata | | 1976 | Thursday | 757 | |

== Publications not listed in newspaper directory ==
- Allen American
- Austin Chronicle
- Community Impact Newspaper
- Fort Worth Weekly
- Forward Times
- Houston Press
- Lake Travis View
- The Leader
- Marion County Herald
- McKinney Courier-Gazette
- Pflugerville Pflag
- San Antonio Current
- Trinity Standard
- La Voz de Houston
- Westlake Picayune
- Wood County Democrat
- Zavala County Sentinel

== College newspapers ==
- The Battalion – Texas A&M University
- The Baylor Lariat – Baylor University
- The Brand – Hardin-Simmons University
- The Collegian – Houston Baptist University
- The Daily Campus - Southern Methodist University
- The Daily Cougar – University of Houston
- The Daily Texan – University of Texas at Austin
- The Daily Toreador – Texas Tech University
- The Dateline Downtown – University of Houston–Downtown
- The East Texan – East Texas A&M University
- The Flame – Texas A&M University–Victoria
- Hilltop Views – St. Edward's University
- The Houstonian – Sam Houston State University
- The Logos – University of the Incarnate Word
- The Mercury – The University of Texas at Dallas
- The Mesquite – Texas A&M University-San Antonio
- North Texas Daily – University of North Texas
- The Pacer – Angelina College
- The Paisano – University of Texas at San Antonio
- The Pine Log – Stephen F. Austin State University
- The Prospector – University of Texas at El Paso
- Ram Page – Angelo State University
- The Rattler – St. Mary's University
- Rice Thresher – Rice University
- The Shorthorn – University of Texas at Arlington
- The Signal – University of Houston–Clear Lake
- TCU Daily Skiff – Texas Christian University
- Trinitonian – Trinity University
- University Press – Lamar University
- The University Star – Texas State University

== Foreign-language newspapers ==
| Title | Locale | Year est. | Frequency | Notes |
|---|---|---|---|---|
| Al Día | Dallas | | | Spanish |
| Buena Suerte Spanish Newspaper | Houston, Austin, Dallas, San Antonio | | | Spanish |
| El Dia | Houston | | | Spanish |
| El Diario de El Paso | El Paso | | | Spanish |
| Diario La Estrella | Fort Worth | | | |
| El Hispano News | Dallas | | | Spanish |
| Mach Song | Houston | | | Vietnamese |
| La Opinión | Jacksonville | | | Spanish |
| El Periodico USA | McAllen | | | Spanish |
| Rumbo de San Antonio | San Antonio | | | Spanish |
| The Texas Telegraph | Dallas | | | Russian |

== Defunct newspapers ==
| Title | Locale | Year est. | Year ceased | Notes |
|---|---|---|---|---|
| Argyle Sun | Argyle | 1986 | 2013 | Was owned by Sun Newspapers |
| Arlington Daily News | Arlington | 1966 | 1989 | |
| Arlington News-Texan | Arlington | | | Also known as Arlington News, Daily News Texan |
| Arlington Morning News | Arlington | 1996 | 2003 | Belo competitor to McClatchy-owned Citizen-Journal |
| Austin Citizen | Austin | 1964 | 1981 | |
| Austin Press | Austin | 1981 | 1982 | |
| Austin Sun | Austin | 1974 | 1978 | Counterculture/alternative newspaper |
| Austin Times Herald | Austin | 1960 | 1963 | |
| Austin Tribune | Austin | | | |
| Brazos Pilot | Bryan | 1877 | 1913) | |
| Bryan Daily Eagle and Pilot | Bryan | 1909 | 1918 | |
| Cedar Creek Pilot | Gun Barrel City | | 2011 | |
| Cleveland Advocate | Cleveland | 1917 | 2021 | |
| Corpus Christi Star | Corpus Christi | | | |
| Steel Country Bee | Daingerfield | 1965 | 2026 | Merged with the Mount Pleasant Tribune in 2026 |
| Dallas Dispatch | Dallas | | | |
| Dallas Dispatch-Journal | Dallas | 1906 | 1938 | |
| Dallas Herald | Dallas | | | |
| Dallas Journal | Dallas | 1914 | 1942 | |
| Dallas Times Herald | Dallas | 1879 | 1991 | |
| Del Rio News-Herald | Del Rio | 1884 | 2020 | |
| Dripping Springs Century News | Dripping Springs | 1990 | 2026 | Merged with the Wimberley View |
| East Bernard Express | East Bernard | 1949 | 2026 | Merged with the Wharton County Leader-Journal |
| Edinburg Review | Edinburg | | | Closed by Gannett in June 2020 |
| El Democrata Fronterizo | Laredo | 1896 | 1920 | |
| El Paso Herald-Post | El Paso | | | |
| El Paso Herald-Post | El Paso | | | |
| Fairfield Recorder | Fairfield | | 2026 | Merged with the Teague Chronicle in 2026 to form the Freestone County Recorder-Chronicle |
| Fort Sam Houston News Leader | San Antonio | | 2016 | Consolidated into JBSA Legacy |
| Fort Worth Press | Fort Worth | | | |
| Houston Evening Journal | Houston | | 1885 | |
| Houston Morning Chronicle | Houston | | 1885 | |
| Houston Post | Houston | 1880 | 1995 | Began as Houston Daily Post |
| Houston Press | Houston | 1911 | 1964 | |
| Jewish Monitor | Fort Worth | 191? | 1921 | |
| La Feria News | La Feria | 1923 | 2025 | |
| Lackland Tailspinner | San Antonio | | 2016 | Consolidated into JBSA Legacy |
| The Lone Star | El Paso | 1881 | 1886 | |
| Merkel Mail | Merkel | 1890 | 2020 | |
| Mineola Monitor | Mineola | 1876 | 2016 | Merged with the Wood County Democrat in 2016 to form the Wood County Monitor |
| Mineral Wells Index | Mineral Wells | 1900 | 2020 | |
| Pittsburg Gazette | Pittsburg | 1884 | 2026 | Merged with the Mount Pleasant Tribune in 2026 |
| Peoples Press | Port Arthur | 1932 | 1941 | |
| Randolph AFB Wingspread | San Antonio | | 2016 | Consolidated into JBSA Legacy |
| The Rosebud News | Rosebud | 1893 | 2026 | Merged with the Marlin Democrat in 2026 |
| San Antonio Gazette | San Antonio | 1904 | 1911 | |
| San Antonio Evening News | San Antonio | 1918 | 1984 | |
| San Antonio Light | San Antonio | 1881 | 1993 | |
| Teague Chronicle | Teague | | 2025 | Merged with the Fairfield Recorder in 2026 to form the Freestone County Recorder-Chronicle |
| Texas City Sun | Texas City | | | |
| Thorndale Champion | Thorndale | 1898 | 2026 | Merged with the Cameron Herald in 2026 |
| Valley Town Crier | McAllen | | | Closed by Gannett in June 2020 |
| The Western Advocate | Austin | February 1843 | February 1844 | |
| The White Man | Jacksboro | 1860 | 1861 | |
| Yorktown News-View | Yorktown | 1895 | 2026 | Merged with the Cuero Record in 2026 |

== See also ==
- Texas media
  - List of radio stations in Texas
  - List of television stations in Texas
  - Media of cities in Texas: Abilene, Amarillo, Austin, Beaumont, Brownsville, Dallas, Denton, El Paso, Fort Worth, Houston, Killeen, Laredo, Lubbock, McAllen, McKinney, Midland, Odessa, San Antonio, Waco, Wichita Falls
- Journalism:
  - Category:Journalists from Texas
  - Press Women of Texas
  - Journalism schools:
    - University of Texas Moody College of Communication, in Austin
    - Texas Christian University Schieffer College of Communication, Dept. of Journalism (est. 1927), in Fort Worth
    - Texas State University School of Journalism and Mass Communication, in San Marcos
    - University of Houston Valenti School of Communication
    - University of North Texas Mayborn School of Journalism, in Denton
- Texas literature
U.S. newspapers

Comprehensive

- Lists of newspapers
- List of newspapers in the United States

Frequency

- List of free daily newspapers in the United States
- List of weekly newspapers in the United States

Circulation

- List of international newspapers originating in the United States
- List of national newspapers in the United States
- List of newspapers in the United States by circulation

Foreign language

- List of French-language newspapers published in the United States
- List of German-language newspapers published in the United States
- List of Spanish-language newspapers published in the United States

Specialty

- List of African-American newspapers in the United States
- List of alternative weekly newspapers in the United States
- List of business newspapers in the United States
- List of family-owned newspapers in the United States
- List of Jewish newspapers in the United States
- List of LGBTQ periodicals in the United States
- List of student newspapers in the United States
- List of supermarket tabloids in the United States
- List of underground press in the United States

Other

- List of defunct newspapers of the United States

== Bibliography ==
- S. N. D. North; United States Department of the Interior (1884). "Catalogue of Periodical Publications: Texas". History and Present Condition of the Newspaper and Periodical Press of the United States. Washington, D.C.: Government Printing Office. OCLC 1850475.
- James T. Haley, ed. (1895), "Newspapers: Texas", Afro-American Encyclopaedia, Nashville: Haley & Florida, hdl:2027/inu.30000029292855, OCLC 219597043
- "Texas". American Newspaper Directory. New York: George P. Rowell. 1900. pp. 1007+. hdl:2027/umn.31951002273861a.
- F. B. Baillio (1916). History of the Texas Press Association. Dallas: Southwestern Printing Company.
- Eugene C. Barker (1917). "Notes on Early Texas Newspapers, 1819-1836". Southwestern Historical Quarterly. 21 (2): 127–144. JSTOR 30234745.
- "Texas". American Newspaper Annual & Directory. Philadelphia: N. W. Ayer & Son. 1922. pp. 949+. hdl:2027/umn.31951001295695n.
- History of the Texas Press and the Texas Press Association (Dallas: Harben-Spotts, 1929)
- Federal Writers' Project (1940), "Newspapers and Radio", Texas: A Guide to the Lone Star State, American Guide Series, New York: Hastings House, pp. 120–124, hdl:2027/mdp.39015002677667 – via HathiTrust
- Works Progress Administration (1941). Texas newspapers, 1813-1939: A union list of newspaper files available in offices of publishers, libraries, and a number of private collections. Houston.
- John Melton Wallace (1966), Gaceta to Gazette: A Check List of Texas Newspapers, 1813-1846
- G. Thomas Tanselle (1971). "General Studies: Texas". Guide to the Study of United States Imprints. Harvard University Press. p. 881. ISBN 978-0-674-36761-6. (Includes information about newspapers)
- Marilyn M. Sibley, Lone Stars and State Gazettes: Texas Newspapers before the Civil War (College Station: Texas A&M University Press, 1983)
- M. Buchholz (1990). "Racial References in the Texas Press, 1813-1836". Journalism Quarterly. 67 (3): 586–591. doi:10.1177/107769909006700314. S2CID 143333222.
- James McEnteer (1992). Fighting Words: Independent Journalists in Texas. University of Texas Press. ISBN 978-0-292-73616-0.
- Charlene Rose Vandini (2000). It's Not about the Money: Small-town Newspapering in Texas. Eakin Press. ISBN 978-1-57168-434-9.
- News in Texas: Essays in Honor of the 125th Anniversary of the Texas Press Association. University of Texas Press. 2005.
