= List of newspapers in Houston =

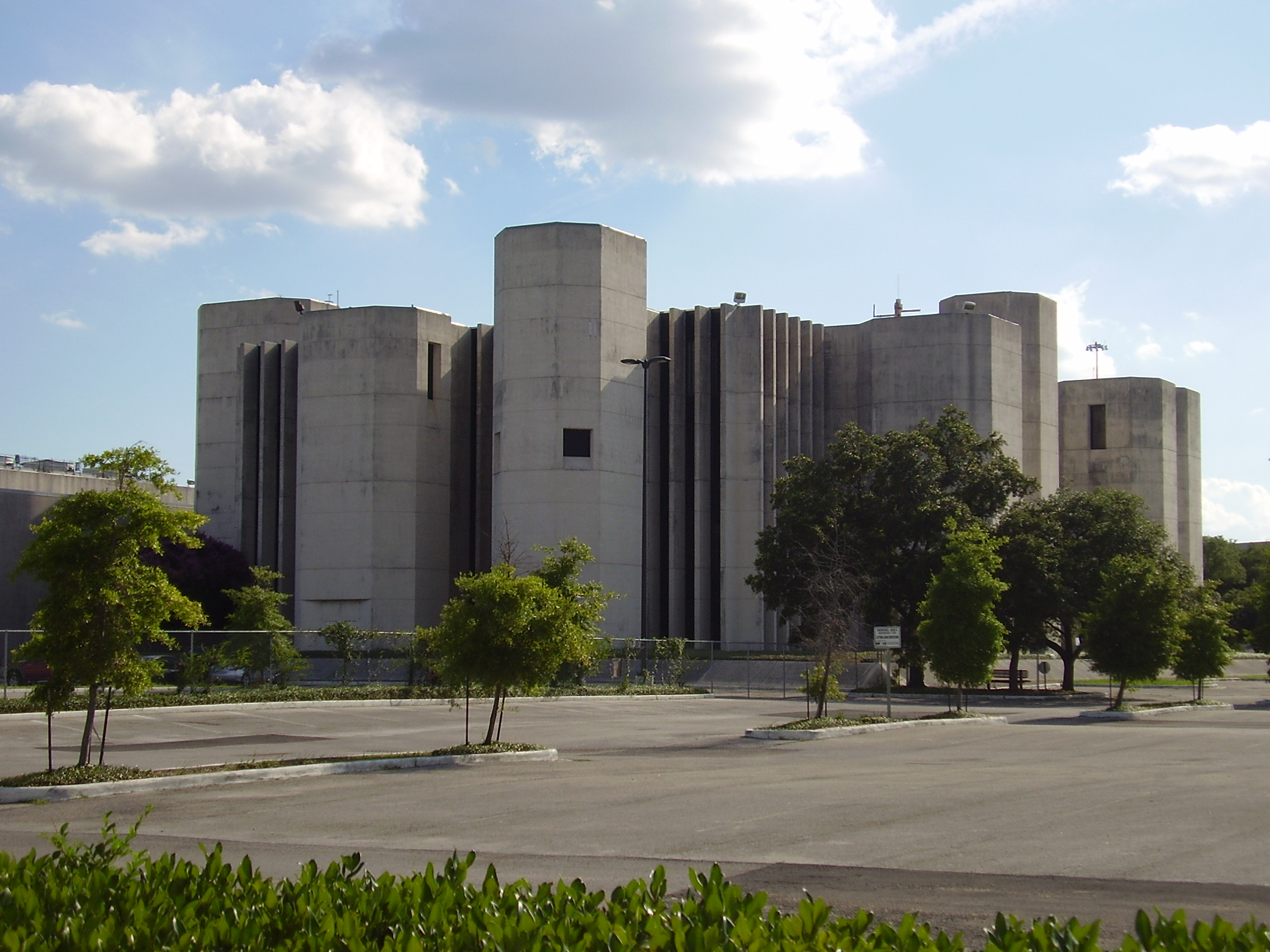
The current Houston Chronicle headquarters, formerly the Houston Post headquarters

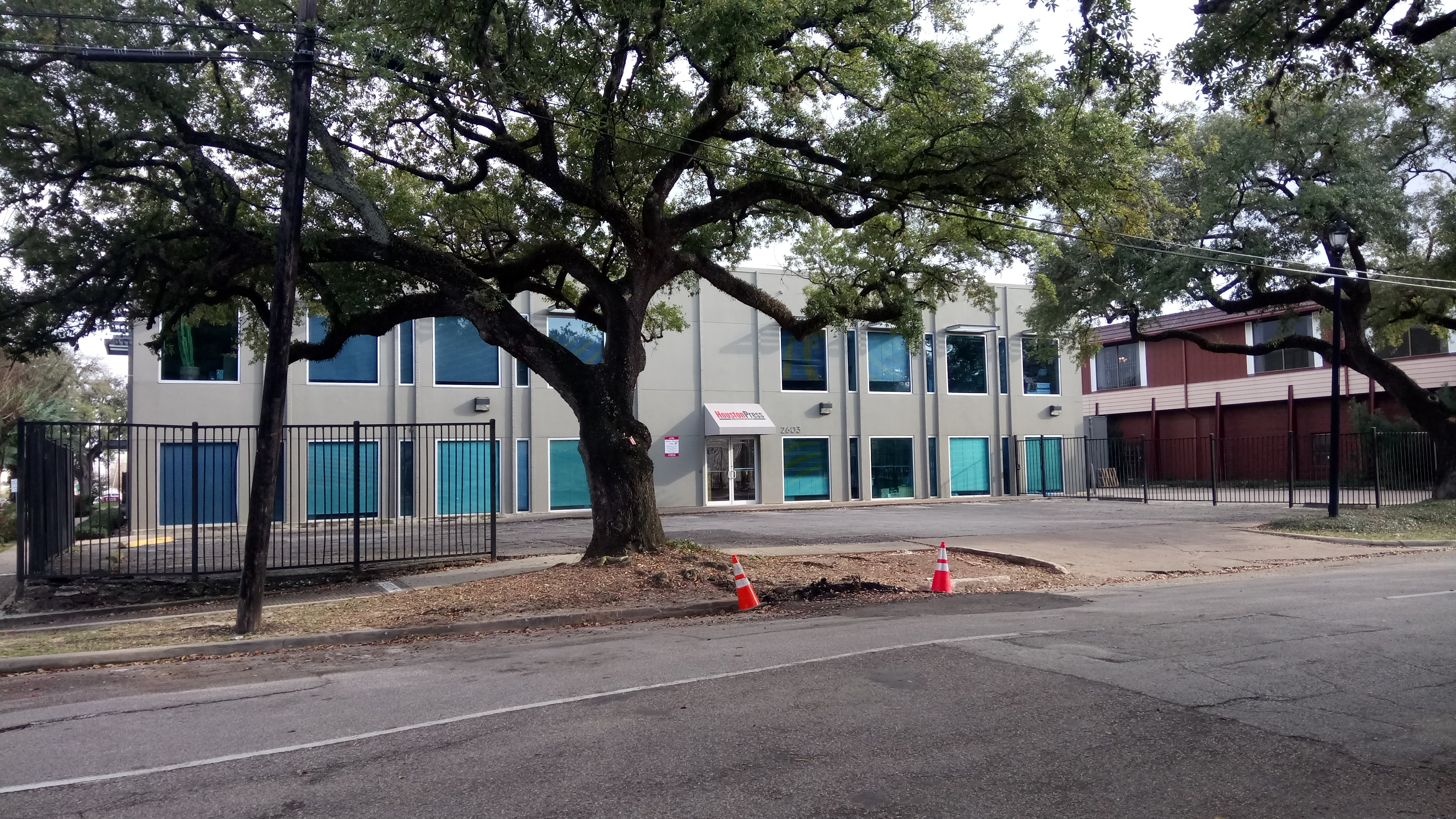
Former Houston Press headquarters in Midtown Houston

== Partial list of area newspapers ==
- Baytown Sun
- Chron.com
- The Collegian (Houston Christian University)
- Community Impact Newspaper
- The Courier (Montgomery County's only daily newspaper)
- The Daily Cougar
- Galveston County Daily News
- Houston Business Journal
- Houston Chronicle
- Houston Defender
- Houston Forward Times
- Houston Press (online only since November 2017)
- The Leader (The Heights, Garden Oaks, Oak Forest, and North Houston)
- Mach Song (national Vietnamese paper)
- La Prensa de Houston
- Rice Thresher

Defunct:

- Bellaire Examiner
- El Día
- Free Press Houston
- Houston NewsPages
- Houston Post
- Houston Voice (LGBTQ newspaper)
- La Gaceta Mexicana
- La Voz de Houston
- Memorial Examiner
- Public News
- River Oaks Examiner
- Sports Edition Magazine
- Telegraph and Texas Register
- The National Outreach (national newspaper)
- West University Examiner

== African-American newspapers ==
Several African-American-owned newspapers are published in Houston. Allan Turner of the Houston Chronicle said that the papers "are both journalistic throwbacks — papers whose content directly reflects their owners' views — and cutting-edge, hyper-local publications targeting the concerns of the city's roughly half-million African-Americans." By 2011 many of the African-American newspapers began to establish presences on the World Wide Web.

== Alternative newspapers ==
There was an underground newspaper called Space City, cofounded by Thorne Dreyer, which operated circa 1971 for around three and a half years. It was operated by a committee of half men and half women. A Ku Klux Klan group attacked the office with a bomb around 1971.

== See also ==
- News media in Houston
- Texas media
  - List of newspapers in Texas
  - List of radio stations in Texas
  - List of television stations in Texas
  - Media of cities in Texas: Abilene, Amarillo, Austin, Beaumont, Brownsville, Dallas, Denton, El Paso, Fort Worth, Killeen, Laredo, Lubbock, McAllen, McKinney, Midland, Odessa, San Antonio, Waco, Wichita Falls
- Texas literature

== Bibliography ==
- Christopher H. Sterling, ed. (2009). "Houston". Encyclopedia of Journalism. Sage. ISBN 9780761929574.
- The Portal to Texas History: Houston County
