= People's Press =

People's Press may refer to:

== Publications ==
- Peoples Press (Port Arthur, Texas)
- Peoples Press (Port Neches, Texas)
- People's Press, an online newspaper from Mauritius
- Donegal People's Press, County Donegal, Ireland
- Owatonna People's Press, Owatonna, Minnesota, United States
- Shanghai People's Press, China

== Publishers ==
- People's Press (Denmark), Denmark
- People's Press (Beijing), China
- People's Press Printing Society, United Kingdom
- Yunnan People's Press
