= The News Herald =

Several newspapers are named The News Herald or The News-Herald, including:

- Borger News-Herald
- News Herald - Port Clinton, Ohio
- News-Herald - Perkasie, Pennsylvania
- Roanoke-Chowan News-Herald
- The Marshfield News-Herald
- The News Herald (North Carolina)
- The News Herald (Panama City)
- The News-Herald - Franklin, Pennsylvania
- The News-Herald - Owenton, Kentucky
- The News-Herald - Vancouver
- The News-Herald (Ohio) – in Lake County, Ohio
- The News-Herald (Oil City, Pennsylvania)
- The News-Herald (Southgate, Michigan)
- Today's News-Herald - Lake Havasu City, Arizona
