= Austin Press =

Former weekly newspaper in Austin, Texas

The Austin Press was a weekly newspaper published in Austin, Texas for less than a year from September 1981 to May 1982.

The newspaper provided notable coverage of a 1981 Travis County Jail riot and lawsuit, Barton Creek environmental coverage regarding chemicals found in the water, protests about the local landfill, the extension of Mopac Expressway, and local economic local development in the downtown and Rainey areas.

After the late 1981 demise of the city's second daily newspaper, the Austin Citizen, the Press considered moving to daily publication to fill its void and compete with the establishment daily Austin American-Statesman.

Austin Press writers included Winston Bode, Carin Pratt, Kim McCormick, Karen-Ann Broe, David Chapin, John Havens, Joanna London, Stephen Morgan, Kevin Phinney, and Leslie Whitaker. Gary Entress (Note: Spelled "Garry" in some sources.) was the newspaper's publisher.

Early in the newspaper's run, Entress touted his newspaper as having "a reputation for good, aggressive reporting and writing, free from influence from special interests". It was editorially left-leaning.
