= Austin Citizen =

Texas newspaper

- Type: Newspaper
- Format: Daily (from 1976) Broadsheet
- Publisher: (1964) Young Gentlemen's Excelsior Coffee Colloquium (1965–1971) Colorado Publishers (1971–c. 1981) Austin Pub. Co.
- General manager: Thomas Reay
- Founded: January 13, 1964; 62 years ago
- Ceased publication: October 1981; 45 years ago
- Political alignment: Conservative
- City: Pflugerville, Texas (1964–1965); Austin, Texas (1965–1981)
- Circulation: 14,500 (as of 1981)
- Price: 25 cents (c. 1980)

The Austin Citizen was a newspaper published in Austin, Texas from 1964 to 1981.

== Overview ==
The Citizen readership base was in West Austin, and said to be "well educated, well-to-do, and civic-minded." A commentary in the Austin Chronicle noted it was editorally "a voice for the conservative and business community", once featuring a column by Ronald Reagan. The paper's financial backers were Republicans.

== Publication history ==
The paper began as a weekly paper called The Travis County Citizen, based in Pflugerville from 1964 to 1965 and then moved to Austin, becoming known variously as The Citizen, The Citizen-Guide, and Citizen News before it became known as the Citizen in 1971, eventually moving to three-times-weekly publication.

Upon changing to daily publication schedule on April 1, 1976, Texas Monthly noted: "No paper has attempted to go daily in a major Texas city in more than 50 years". The Dallas Morning News considered buying the Citizen in 1979. After trying to stay afloat by raising its price to 25 cents and printing in a smaller tabloid format, it folded in October 1981. At that time, the Citizen was an afternoon publication issued five days a week with a circulation of about 14,500 and 80 employees; it was led by Thomas Reay as general manager and executive editor with John F. Warren as publisher.

== Features and contributors ==
During its weekly days, the Citizen featured a front-page column by Wray Weddell, called an "industry-boosting editor" by the progressive Texas Observer. Michael Eakin of the counterculture Austin Sun newspaper opined in 1974 that Weddell had "completely polarized" the issue of economic growth in Austin, saying: "He has people thinking in terms of growth or no growth ... There are alternatives and we want people to be aware of them." Further reflecting on the two newspapers publishing in the city at that time, Eakin noted that "you do not have a paper which deals with primarily local issues read by a really broad-based group of people."

According to a 1978 Texas Monthly article, however, the Citizen boasted strong municipal government coverage, with a local public affairs consultant saying the paper "blows the Statesman away on city reporting", including besting the larger, establishment daily on sewage dumping into the Colorado River, city staffing problems, and misuse of public funds.

Other Citizen staff included arts and entertainment writer John Bustin, lifestyles writer Carolyn Bengston, photographer Robert Godwin, and editorial cartoonist Roger "Rabbi" Moore.
