= Public News (Houston) =

Newspaper in Houston, Texas, US

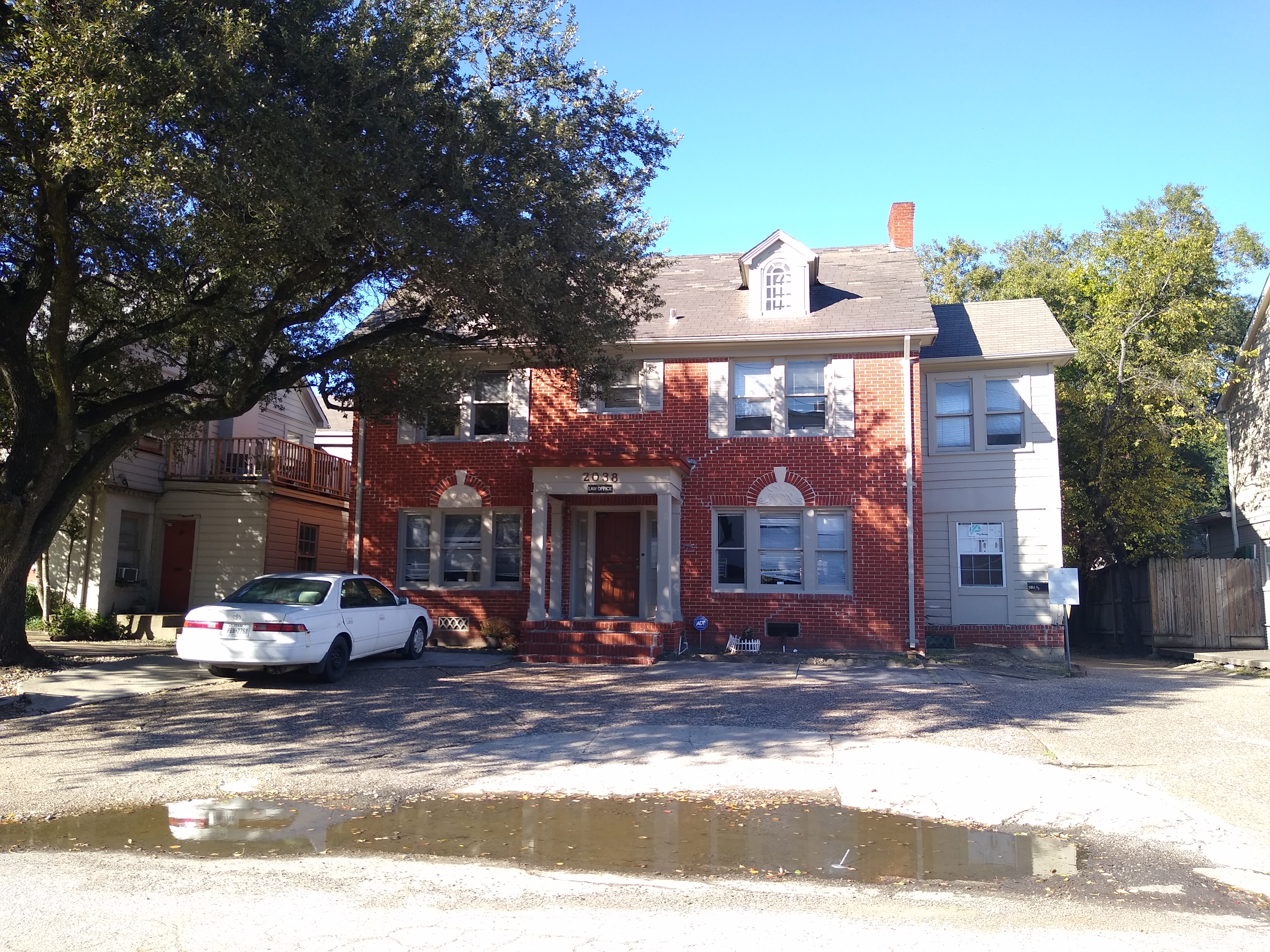
- 2038 Lexington, PN World Headquarters headquarters 1992-1998
- Type: Print publication/Online publication
- Format: Print/Online
- Owner(s): Richard Tomcala (1982-circa 1984); Bert Woodall (circa 1984-1998)
- Founder: Richard Tomcala
- Founded: 1982
- Ceased publication: 1998
- Language: English
- Headquarters: Houston, TX
- Circulation: 47,000 (1997)
- Website: publicnews.com at the Wayback Machine (archive index)

Public News (PN) was an alternative newsweekly in Houston, Texas established in February 1982. The paper ceased publication in July 1998, with its advertising base and paid circulation acquired by the Houston Press, part of the New Times Media alternative newspaper chain. It was headquartered at 2038 Lexington in Houston. For most of its history, the owner was Bert Woodall. In 1997 the circulation was 47,000. It was published each Wednesday, and distributed for free. It had a focus on the arts, including music. The paper ranged in size from 12 to 56 pages, but most editions ran to 36 pages. It had a cooperation agreement with the Alternative Weekly Network (AWN), but was not a member of the New Times-dominated Association of Alternative Newsmedia (AAN).

Jim Sherman, who wrote articles for the newspaper in the 1980s, described it as "the only publication that a lot of people that are alienated by the mainstream media thought had any integrity" and that "It was almost like the tribal drums of the inner loop counter-culture for 16 years." [sic] Marty Racine of the Houston Chronicle wrote that "the uneven Public News has a fiercely independent if Houston-Proud spirit that puts it in a category of its own." Claudia Kolker, from the same newspaper, wrote that many Houstonians thought of the Public News as being their "community property" even while admitting that it "had many flaws".

== History ==
Richard Tomcala created the publication as a flier in 1982 to advertise a nightclub, Rock Island/The Island, and this morphed into a newspaper. Bert Woodall came to the publication in early 1983 as a volunteer and, June 1984, bought the publication in two increments, spending $25,000 (about $77474.38 inflation-adjusted) for the first 51% and additional funds for the remainder six months after the initial purchase. He borrowed the initial payment from his parents, who owned newspapers in several East Texas towns.

Woodall, who was born in Kansas, grew up in Jacksonville, Texas. He arrived in Houston in 1973 and, after working as a laborer for a period—including almost a year as printer for the Greensheet, followed by a brief stint with Fischer Bros. Circus—enrolled at University of Houston in Fall of 1974. He graduated from UH with a political science degree and worked while studying. He graduated in December 1979, and worked for UH until April 1983 as activities advisor and coordinator of Sundry School, a program on non-credit courses.

Public News evolved throughout its history, from its beginnings covering mainly the punk rock scene in Houston, to a general purpose alternative weekly with a determined focus on Houston—Houston-based musicians, artists, theater groups, the club scene, and feature stories with a local slant. (Film, concert, record and book reviews were the sole departures from the local-only commitment.) PN also featured the semi-snarky weekly Public Noise column, Red Connelly's Sports for Heretics, several Houston-based cartoonists and many photographers. The paper also presented a unique opportunity for non- and pre-professional journalists to learn the craft, and dozens of writers saw their work published during the paper's run.

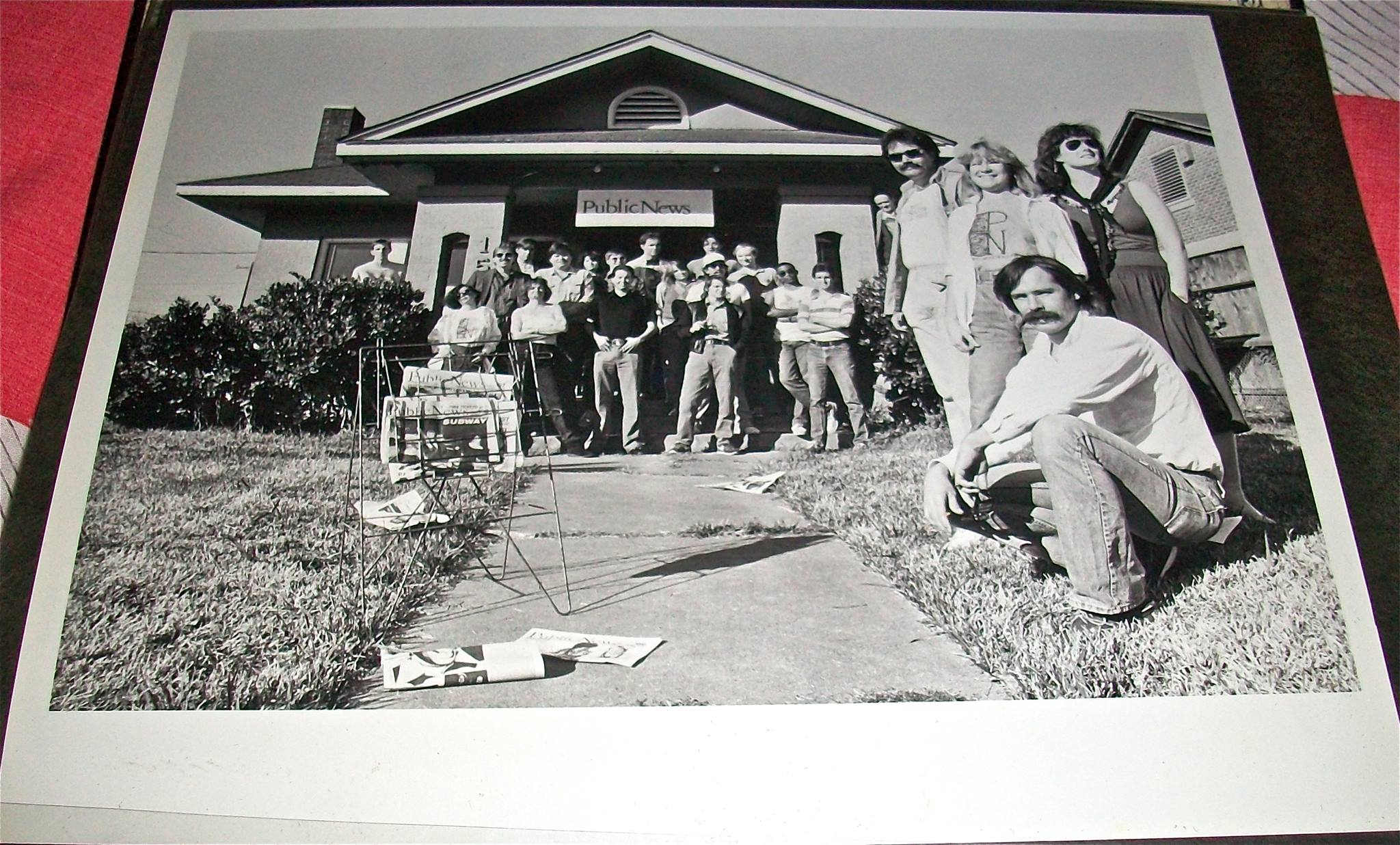
Public News staff pictured at 1540 W. Alabama, Houston, Texas upon publication of PN #200

Perhaps Public News' greatest distinction throughout its 14-year run was curating and publishing a near-comprehensive calendar of public event. This calendar attracted many of PN's readers and also helped foster a considerable share of the paper's advertising base.

Woodall's management of the paper was not untroubled. In a final editorial he acknowledged his alcoholism, and admitted to being "stoned" through much of his tenure. In an interview, though, Woodall said "We might not have been in business if I'd been sober all along. I might not have been crazy enough to stay with it." Long-time PN columnist Richard Connelly said much the same thing in a 2009 retrospective in Houston Press. "The incomparable Bert Woodall admitted he probably would have never kept the enterprise going if he had been sober enough to grasp the financial folly of it."

Finances at Public News were always precarious. In 1986, Internal Revenue Service (IRS) obligations nearly put the paper out of business. Music venue The Red Lion held an all-day benefit for PN. A number of bands played for free, with artist/musician Beans Barton serving as MC, auctioning off T-shirts all day. Thus rescued, Woodall was able to discharge a tax debt of roughly $6,000. When the paper was liquidated in 1998, the paper had about $70,000 debt to the IRS. $70,000 of the purchase price (about $138270.72 inflation-adjusted) went to pay accumulated tax debt and money owed to the printer, Mirror Publishing, in League City.

According to Woodall, the paper's fate was sealed due to two advertising quarters revenue insufficient cover printing costs. At the same time, the Internal Revenue Service (IRS) wanted him to pay the agency $20,000 (about $39505.92 inflation-adjusted) each month to discharge existing tax debts. Woodall asked the owners of the Houston Press, New Times Media, to take over the paper's assets and he declined an offer from the New Times for a loan that would allow him to continue publication; Woodall cited financial issues as the reason he declined the offer. New Times was interested in obtaining Public News' advertising relationships and lists as well as the physical assets.

On July 8, 1998, the final Public News edition was released, and the publication was liquidated the following day. Houston Press essentially paid the paper to cease publication. Woodall wrote a final editorial, in which he stated "I am not and will likely never be a very good businessman." The Houston Press acquired the assets of Public News, including its advertising information, circulation racks, circulation stops, computer equipment, and equipment for production, in exchange for an undisclosed sum which resolved all of the IRS debt. Most of the paper's equipment and furnishing were distributed to the displaced staffers, and newspaper racks were given to Leisure Learning Unlimited, a non-credit class program operated by Ted Weisgal, a long time friend of Woodall.

Woodall declined to disclose the final price, but insisted that he did not make a lot of money from it. Three employees of Public News' sales department were offered advertising sales jobs at Houston Press, and two accepted their job offers. Three employees of Public News' sales department were offered jobs, and two began working for the Houston Press upon acceptance of their job offers. The administrative employees, numbering nine, lost their jobs. Administrative and editorial employees, full and part-time writers, photographers and contractors lost their jobs. At its end Public News had 37 employees on the payroll and around a dozen independent contractors.

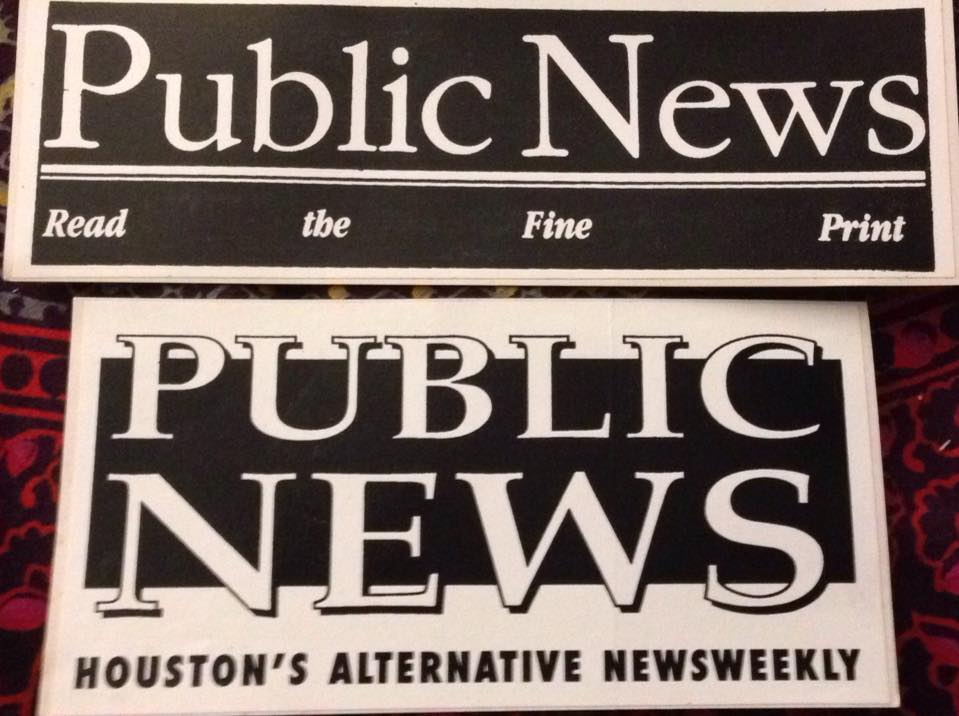
PN bumper stickers, 1983 and 1986

== Contents ==
The paper offered a steady diet of reviews, previews and features primarily spotlighting music, movies, art, theater, records, and books. Regular columns were featured, most notably the Public Noise column, written by a series of PN Music Editors, and a "sports" column by Red Connelly. The publication's orientation broadened along with its circulation, but the paper essentially remained true to its counter-culture roots. Public News from the beginning exhibited a liberal editorial bent. Houston Press feature writer and music critic, Brad Tyer, described Woodall's editorials as "the only out-and-out leftist, I'm-a-liberal editorials around." Kolker stated "Some say Woodall's own writing was the most distinctive feature." Kolker described Connelly's columns as "saucy" and that some community members regarded his Sports for Heretics as "peak PN."

Public News "World Headquarters" was at 2038 Lexington from 1993 to 1998. From 1985 through 1992 the paper was housed at 1540 W. Alabama. Not counting six weeks in Richard Tomcala's Castle Court apartment, PN was published for its first three years out of the old Fannin Hotel at Isabella and Fannin streets.

== See also ==
- List of newspapers in Houston
