= Austin American-Statesman =

Daily broadsheet newspaper in Texas

- Front page of the Austin American-Statesman, May 30, 2024
- Type: Daily newspaper
- Format: Broadsheet
- Owner: Hearst Communications
- Founded: 1871; 155 years ago (as the Democratic Statesman)
- Headquarters: 8000 Metropolis Drive Building A. STE. 100; Austin, Texas 78744
- Circulation: 17,000 Digital Subscribers: 26,455 Daily; 33,699 Sunday; (as of 2022)
- ISSN: 1553-8451
- Website: statesman.com

The Austin American-Statesman is the major daily newspaper for Austin, the capital city of the U.S. state of Texas. It is owned by Hearst Communications. The distribution of the following The New York Times, The Washington Post, Associated Press, and USA TODAY international and national news, but also incorporates Central Texas coverage, especially in political reporting. The paper covers the area's music scene, especially the annual South by Southwest Music Festival, and co-sponsors Austin events such as the Capital 10K, one of the largest 10K runs in the U.S., and the Season for Caring charity campaign. In the Austin market, the Statesman competes with the Austin Chronicle, an alternative weekly.

== Circulation ==
In 2009, the Austin American-Statesman ranked 60th in circulation among daily newspapers, according to the Audit Bureau of Circulations. Figures from Scarborough Research show the Statesman — in print and online – reaches 68% of Central Texans in an average week.

Following a national trend among daily newspapers, the Statesman has seen drastic circulation declines in recent years. Austin is one of America's most internet-connected cities, though not ranked in the 25 largest "connected" cities, and in a related trend, the Statesman's daily circulation ranks among those cities seeing drops of 5% or more in recent reports. As compared to a U.S. national decline of 2.1%, the Statesman's daily circulation in the most recent six-month reporting period fell 5.6% to 173,527. Its Sunday circulation fell 5.5% to 215,984. Austin is the 11th-largest city (and the 35th-largest metropolitan area) in the U.S.

== Politics ==
The Statesman endorsed George W. Bush in the 2000 and 2004 presidential elections, and Republican governor Rick Perry along with every other Republican incumbent in 2006. In the 2008 presidential election, however, the paper endorsed Barack Obama. The Statesman also provides coverage of Libertarian Party and Green Party matters.

== History ==
Founded as the triweekly Democratic Statesman in 1871, the newspaper was originally allied with the state Democratic party during Reconstruction. It began daily publication as a morning paper in 1873. After absorbing the Austin Tribune in 1914, it published as the afternoon Austin Statesman and Tribune, then became an evening paper and changed its name to the Austin Evening Statesman in 1916.

A rival paper, the morning Austin American, began in 1914. Waco-based newspapermen Charles E. Marsh and E.S. Fentress bought the American in 1919 and the Evening Statesman in 1924. Merged under one company, the morning and evening papers published separately during the week and combined for a Sunday Austin American Statesman edition. The company continued separate titles until 1973, when all products became the American-Statesman, with four editions daily.

Cox Enterprises acquired the Statesman when it bought the Waco newspaper company in 1976. In 1987, the Statesman moved to morning-only publication. In 2008, Cox put the Statesman up for sale with most of its other newspaper holdings to pay down debt. A year later, the company pulled the paper off the market, citing a lack of suitable offers.

The newspaper was part of the subsidiary Cox Media Group, which joined the corporation's television, radio, and newspaper assets under one umbrella in 2008.

The Statesman was named Texas Associated Press Managing Editors' Newspaper of the Year in 2013, 2014, and 2016, besting Houston, San Antonio, and Dallas.

In 2015, ¡Ahora Sí! was named the best Spanish-language newspaper in the country for its circulation size by the National Association of Hispanic Publishers.

On March 6, 2018, the sale of the Statesman to GateHouse Media from Cox Media Group was announced. Upon taking over in April, GateHouse said the Statesman would be the "flagship" of the expanding chain, noting its existing 240-employee design and editing hub in Austin.

In August 2019, New Media Investment Group, the parent entity of GateHouse Media, announced it had agreed to buy Gannett (the longtime parent company of USA Today, the Arizona Republic, the Detroit Free Press, and several other newspapers), and operations would continue under the Gannett rather than GateHouse name, at the Gannett headquarters outside Washington, DC, but under New Media's CEO. The acquisition of Gannett by New Media Investment Group was completed on November 19, 2019. Gannett sold the Austin American-Statesman in February 2025 to Hearst Communications.

In March 2022, The Statesman moved to a six-day printing schedule, eliminating its printed Saturday edition.

== Community weeklies ==
The Austin American-Statesman publishes these community weeklies:

- The Bastrop Advertiser
- Smithville Times
- Westlake Picayune
- Lake Travis View
- Round Rock Leader
- Pflugerville Pflag

== See also ==
- List of newspapers in Texas
