= Texas literature =

Literature about the history and culture of Texas

Texas literature is literature about the history and culture of Texas. It ranges broadly in literary genres and dates from the time of the first European contact. Representative authors include Mary Austin Holley and Katherine Anne Porter.

== Literature through the nineteenth century ==
=== Non-fiction ===
Mary Austin Holley

The earliest works relating to Texas were written in Spanish and were primarily historical in nature. Authors and works include:

- Álvar Núñez Cabeza de Vaca — Relación (1542)
- Alonso de Benavides — Memorials (1630–34)
- Isidro de Espinosa - Chronicle (1746)
- Anthony Ganilh — Ambrosio de Letinez (1838)

The first English book which was solely about Texas was Texas (1833) by Mary Austin Holley, cousin of Stephen F. Austin. It was expanded in 1836 and retitled History of Texas.

A later author in this period, John Crittenden Duval, was dubbed the "Father of Texas Literature" by J. Frank Dobie. Duval wrote Early Times in Texas (serial form, 1868–71; book, 1892) and Adventures of Big-Foot Wallace (1872).

=== Fiction ===
Fiction about Texas was written starting in the early 19th century and consisted primarily of romantic historical novels. The Alamo figured prominently in many of these works by authors such as Augusta Evans Wilson and Jeremiah Clemens.

== 1900 to the present ==
=== Non-fiction ===
Two seminal writers who wrote about Texas in the Western tradition are J. Frank Dobie and Walter Prescott Webb. Other non-fiction writers about Texas include Tom (Thomas Calloway) Lea, Paul Horgan, and J. Evetts Haley.

=== Fiction ===
One of the most notable early 20th century works of Texas fiction was The Log of a Cowboy (1903) by Andy Adams. It was written in response to the immensely popular novel by Owen Wister, The Virginian, which had been published a year earlier.

Joseph A. Altsheler wrote a trilogy of Texas fiction in his series The Texan Star (1912), The Texan Scouts (1913), and The Texan Triumph (1913).

Noteworthy authors of the 1930s include Edward Anderson, whose novel Thieves Like Us (1937) has been filmed twice: first in 1949 by RKO Radio Pictures as They Live by Night, later in 1974 MGM/UA studios released Thieves Like Us, directed by Robert Altman. This period also included the work of pulp magazine authors, such as Robert E. Howard and Jim Thompson.

Born in Indian Creek, Katherine Anne Porter is arguably the finest 20th century short-story writer from the state. Her childhood home in Kyle was dedicated as a National Literary Landmark in 2002.

Post-World War II authors of fictional accounts of Texas include Elmer Kelton and Larry McMurtry. Cormac McCarthy and Gloria Anzaldúa are contemporary writers whose work is set in the state.

== See also ==
- Texas Institute of Letters
- Handbook of Texas
- Category:Texas literature
- List of newspapers in Texas
- Southern literature (United States)
