= Jefferson Jimplecute =

- Join Industry, Manufacturing, Planting, Labor, Energy, Capital (in) Unity Together Everlastingly.
- Type: Weekly newspaper
- Format: Broadsheet
- Owner: Marion County Media
- Founder: Ward Taylor
- Publisher: Austin Lewter & Hugh Lewis
- Editor: Hugh Lewis & Austin Lewter
- Founded: 1848
- Language: English
- Headquarters: 115 N. Polk Street; Jefferson, Texas 75657
- Circulation: 714 (as of 2023)
- Website: jimplecute.com

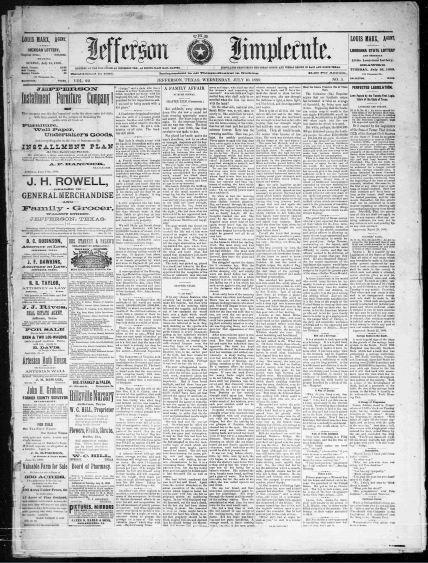
Jefferson Jimplecute Front Page from 1889

The Jefferson Jimplecute is a weekly newspaper published in the city of Jefferson, Texas. It is the newspaper of record and the county seat newspaper serving Marion County. It was founded in 1848 by Ward Taylor and is the fifth-oldest newspaper in the state. It is owned and published by Marion County Media.

== Name ==
A Mental Floss article listed it as one of "14 Wonderfully Odd American Newspaper Names". The origin of the paper's unusual name is not certain since the original publisher did not leave any clues. Several theories as to the source of the name have been floated, among them:

1. A mythical creature, "composed of elements of a dragon, an Indian, an armadillo, and a lion."
2. A slang term meaning "sweetheart."
3. An acronym for the motto "Join Industry, Manufacturing, Planting, Labor, Energy, Capital (in) Unity Together Everlastingly" is the most widely accepted theory. This is the paper's motto and appears in the paper's masthead.

== History ==
Archived editions of the Jimplecute are available at the Library of Congress as part of Chronicling America.

In June 2015, the Jimplecute's entire staff quit over a pay dispute, announcing plans to start a rival publication. At the time, Bob Palmer, publisher, owner, and editor of the Jimplecute, indicated that the loss of his staff would not impact the paper's delivery, stating about his former employees, "the Jimplecute will go out on time; we'll have a paper this week. It's a free country. They can go do whatever they want to do."

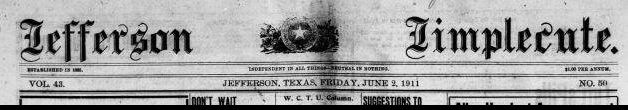
Jefferson Jimplecute Front Page Header from 1911

In 2020, the newspaper gained national attention when it published an obituary that blamed United States President Donald Trump, Texas Governor Greg Abbott, and others for the death of a man from complications of COVID-19.

On Friday, July 17, 2020, the paper's digital portal (www.jimplecute1848.com), as well as their Facebook account, went offline without any advance warning or announcement.

On August 21, 2020, it was announced that two former Jimplecute editors - V. Hugh Lewis, publisher of the online Marion County Herald, and Austin Lewter, a community newspaper publisher - purchased the publication from Strube-Palmer Media. Lewis and Lewter, both having been editors of the Jimplecute at varying times in its past, partnered to acquire the publication and now operate it as co-publishers.
