= El Hispano News =

Dallas Latinx-interest newspaper

- Type: Weekly newspaper
- Format: Broadsheet
- Publisher: Lupita Colmenero
- Founded: 1986
- Language: Spanish
- Headquarters: 2102 Empire Central Dallas, TX 75235
- Circulation: 15,000
- Website: elhispanonews.com

El Hispano News is a Spanish language newspaper circulated throughout the Dallas-Fortworth area. The Hispanic-oriented newspaper was established in 1986 in Dallas, Texas, and serves its Spanish-speaking community. The paper originally began as a twelve-page tabloid until it changed its format to broadsheet in 1987 and began circulating 15,000 copies. By 1993, the paper had launched a Hispanic Total Market Coverage program. The program resulted in 90 percent coverage of the Hispanic market. The program includes a special edition issue, circulating 75,000 copies during holidays largely celebrated by the Hispanic community.

== Resources ==
El Hispano News
