= Peoples Press (Port Arthur, Texas) =

The Peoples Press OCLC 49565998 was a weekly newspaper in Port Arthur, Texas, published from 1932 until 1941. Its circulation was reported as 1,500 for 1933-39 and 2,500 for 1940–41. The editor was Carl White, who was previously the editor of Peoples Press in Port Neches from 1925 until 1931.
