= Houston County Courier =

- Publisher: Kelli Barnes
- Editor: Chris Edwards
- Founded: 1890
- Headquarters: 107 South 7th St. Crockett, TX 75835-1694
- Circulation: 3,563 (as of 2023)
- Website: easttexasnews.com

Houston County Courier is a newspaper based out of Crockett, Texas. It is a division of East Texas News and a publication of Polk County Publishing Company.

== History ==
The Courier began operations in 1890 under the name The Crockett Weekly Courier. The newspaper was established by W. B. Page under publisher Giles M. Haltom.

In 1958, the Courier merged with the Crockett Democrat to form the Courier Democrat. In 1960, the paper became the Houston County Courier.
