= Beeville Bee-Picayune =

- Type: Weekly newspaper
- Owner(s): South Texas News, Inc.
- Publisher: Dennis Wade
- Editor: Dylan Dozier
- Founded: 1886
- Language: English
- Headquarters: 111 N. Washington, Beeville, Texas United States
- Circulation: 1,990 (as of 2023)
- ISSN: 0889-8618
- Website: Official website

Beeville Bee-Picayune is a weekly newspaper based in Beeville, Texas.

== History ==
In February 2020, the paper was sold by Beeville Publishing Co., Inc. to Coastal Bend Publishing, an affiliate of McElvy Media Group. Other papers included in the deal were the Advance-Guard Press, the News of San Patricio, the Progress and Karnes Countywide.

In October 2023, the newspaper was sold to South Texas News, Inc.
