= Ambrosio de Letinez =

Ambrosio de Letinez is an early Texan novel held by the consensus of scholars to be written by Anthony Ganilh, a French-American Catholic missionary priest. It was first issued in 1838 as Mexico versus Texas, a Descriptive Novel, most of the Characters of which are Living Persons, and later republished as Ambrosio de Letinez, or the First Texian Novel, Embracing a Description of the Countries Bordering on the Rio Bravo, With Incidents of the War of Independence.

== Question of authorship ==
Most scholarship places Fr. Anthony Ganilh of the Diocese of Bardstown, who had departed from the United States of America in 1835, following a meeting with the Mexican Liberal ideologist José María Luis Mora in Cincinnati, Ohio hoping to establish a blanket factory in Mapimí, Mexico following failed literary ventures and legal issues. However, this pursuit seems to have failed, as despite the lack of documentation of Ganilh's time, evidence points to Ganilh to have returned to Bardstown with priestly faculties granted to him by the Bishop of the Diocese of Linares (presently, Monterrey) on the onset of the Pastry War. It seems that Ganilh did return to Texas in 1840 between the publication of the first and second publication to deliver an edition of his novel to deliver a copy to Sam Houston, the first President of the Republic of Texas.
