= Katy Times =

Texas newspaper

- Type: Weekly newspaper
- Owner: Hartman Newspapers LP
- Publisher: Susan Rovegno
- Founded: 1913
- Headquarters: 5319 E. Fifth Street, Katy, Texas
- Circulation: 1,525 (as of 2023)
- Website: katytimes.com

The Katy Times is a local newspaper that serves the city of Katy, Texas and surrounding suburban neighborhoods. Its tagline is "Serving as the news source for the Greater Katy Area since 1913."

== History ==
The Katy Times was first published in 1913 by John C. Adams under its original name, The Brookshire Times. At the time, the newspaper mostly covered news in the city of Brookshire, Texas and not Katy, Texas as Brookshire was much older and larger than Katy. However, as Katy was experiencing rapid growth, the two cities soon began to share news.

In September 1914, ownership of the newspaper transferred to Adolph Baylis Anderson and his wife, Pat Anderson, when they bought the newspaper. Upon the death of Pat Anderson in 1934, Mary Anne Ernstes was hired to help out Mr. Anderson. Ernstes became publisher in 1944 and eventually bought the newspaper in 1949 when Mr. Anderson died. The paper was moved to Ernstes' hometown of Katy in the late 1950s. In April 1973, The Brookshire Times was sold to Tri-County Newspapers and titled The Times. The newspaper received its current day name in 1984.

As of 2019, it publishes 5,000 copies weekly on Thursday. Fenice Community Media announced an agreement to purchase the Katy Times from Hartman Newspapers LP in July 2019 after Hartman Newspapers announced that it planned to cease the newspaper's print operation on July 25. Fenice President and Chief Operating Officer Scott Coleman announced that Karen Lopez would take over as publisher of the Katy Times.

== Awards ==
The Katy Times has won numerous awards in its division for different categories from the Texas Press Association's Better Newspaper Contest. Coverage in the Katy Times includes News, Sports, Opinion, Obituaries, Education, Classifieds, and Special Sections. The newspaper ranked second place for Sports Coverage in 2011 and 2016. In 2014, the Katy Times ranked second place for Headline Writing. In 2015, the newspaper was awarded third place for Editorial, third place for Headline Writing, and fourth place for Community Service. The Katy Times has also won several awards from the Texas Gulf Coast Press Association in 2018, including second place for News Writing, third place for Special Section, second place for Feature Writing, third place for Sports Coverage, as well as honorable mentions for Sports Photos and General Excellence.
