= Houston Press =

Online newspaper in Houston, Texas, US

- Type: Online publication
- Format: Online
- Owner: Unknown
- Founder(s): Chris Hearne and John Wilburn
- Publisher: Stuart Folb
- Editor: Margaret Downing
- Founded: 1989
- Language: English
- Headquarters: Houston, Texas
- Circulation: 43,810 (as of June 2016)
- Website: www.houstonpress.com

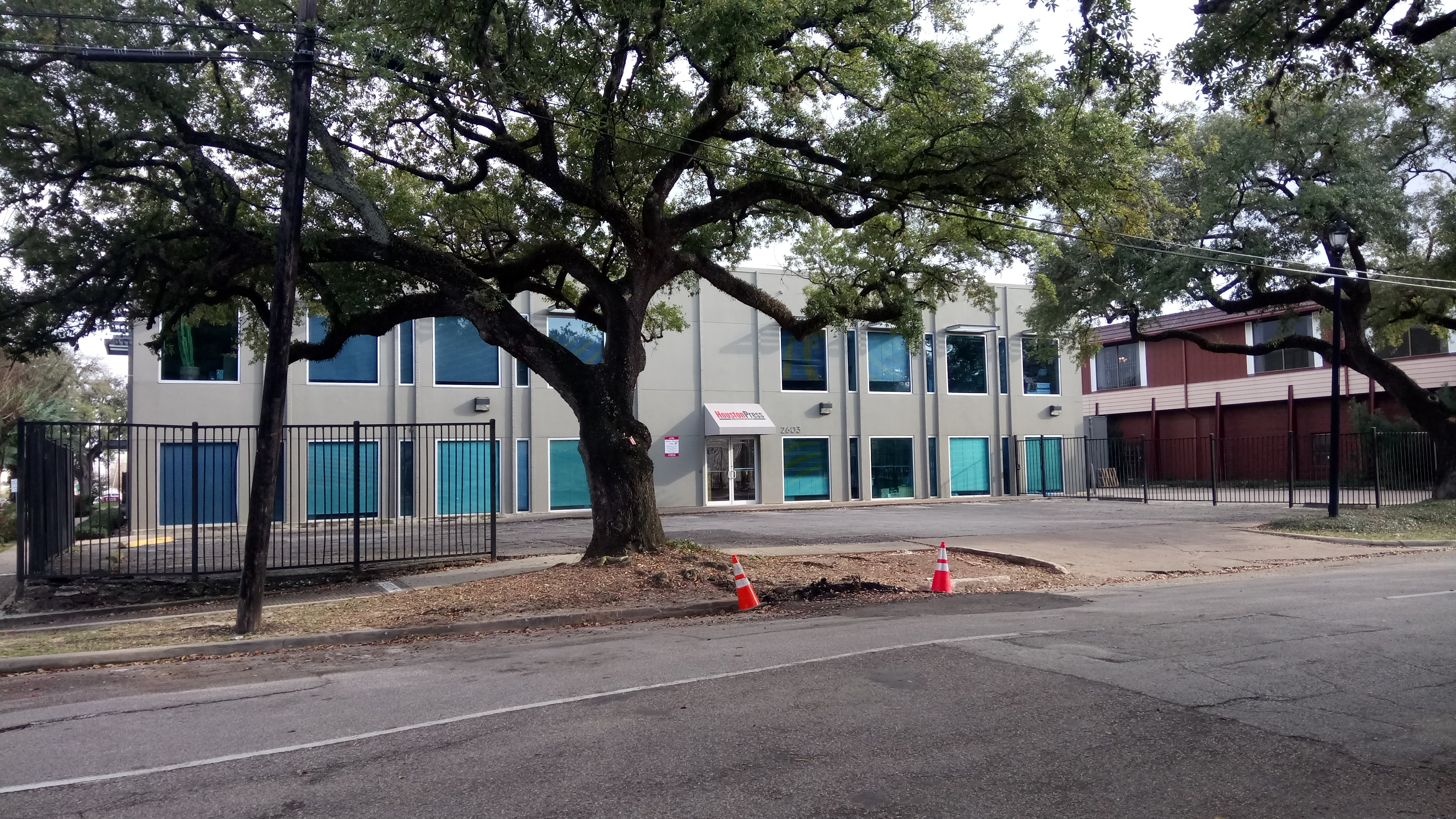
Former Houston Press headquarters in Midtown Houston

The Houston Press is an online newspaper published in Houston, Texas, United States. It is headquartered in the Midtown area. It was also a weekly print newspaper until November 2017.

The publication is supported entirely by advertising revenue and is free to readers. It reports a monthly readership of 1.6 million online users. Prior to the 2017 cessation of the print edition, the Press was found in restaurants, coffee houses, and local retail stores. New weekly editions were distributed on Thursdays.

== History ==
The alt-weekly Houston Press was founded in 1989 by John Wilburn, Chris Hearne (founder of Austin's Third Coast Magazine) and Kirk Cypel (a vice president of a Houston-based investment group) conceived of this news and entertainment weekly after rejecting a business plan to relaunch Texas Business Magazine.

Hearne and John Wilburn, who previously managed the Sunday magazine of the Dallas Morning News, jointly established the magazine. Hearne was the paper's first publisher and Cypel served as the organization's business advisor. Although the paper faced early challenges, the landscape changed when Hearne and Cypel engineered a buyout of 713 Magazine, a key competitor. Once in control of 713, they stopped its publication and converted advertisers to the Houston Press. Thereafter, the Houston Press's advertising and circulation grew dramatically. Prior to the establishment of the Houston Press, the city did not have a major alternative weekly publication. Its original cover story was about the election of the Mayor of Houston.

For the newspaper's first five years, Niel Morgan served as the investor, and therefore the owner; Morgan was a real estate developer. Due to Wilburn's desire to get mainstream advertising, he chose not to run sexually oriented advertising. After Wilburn and Morgan found themselves disagreeing over aspects of the paper, Wilburn quit. In the period before 1993 the Houston Press experienced financial difficulties. That year, Morgan sold the paper to New Times Media.

Sexually oriented advertising appeared after the sale. The paper's fortunes improved due to the dot-com bubble of 1997–2001 and the increase in advertising; it was one of the first alternative weeklies in the United States to establish a website. In 1998 Houston Press acquired the assets of an alternative paper, Public News, that was ceasing operations. Employees of Public News' sales department began working for the Houston Press. That year Margaret Downing became the primary editor. There were 23 reporters and editors in 1998. Michael Hardy stated in the Texas Observer that the "heyday" of the paper was around 2004.

Advertising-related income declined due to the rise of persons reading articles online, as well as the establishment of Craigslist. In 2005, New Times acquired Village Voice Media, and changed its name to Village Voice Media. In September 2012, Village Voice Media executives Scott Tobias, Christine Brennan and Jeff Mars bought Village Voice Media's papers and associated web properties from its founders and formed Voice Media Group. The paper's fortunes declined, as Backpage, which separated from Village Voice Media, had contributed significant funding.

On November 3, 2017, Voice Media Group announced that it would cease printing of the Press, moving to online-only publication, and that the paper would only use freelance journalists. Voice Media Group cited Hurricane Harvey as the final factor behind the cessation, and Downing stated that a recession in the oil industry and the decline of revenue from advertising contributed to the decision. The majority of the Press employees, including nine full-time editorial staff members and at least six employees on the advertising staff, lost their jobs. Downing and publisher Stuart Folb continued, along with a small advertising staff and marketing manager. The online-only scenario was a compromise reached by Downing and Folb with the owners, who initially wished to completely shut the paper down.

In 2021, Voice Media Group sold the Houston Press to an anonymous buyer.

== Content ==
Hardy stated that the Houston Press, known for its coverage of the culture of Houston, was like a "court jester" compared to the Houston Chronicle being the "king" of Houston's journalism industry; he added "Its music and arts listings were more comprehensive and reliable than those of the Chronicle, which often seemed painfully out of touch, and it had the best critics in the city." He added that "The Press established a reputation for punching above its weight" in regards to investigative journalism, citing how an article led to the exoneration of Roy Criner.

The publication included John Nova Lomax's articles on the cityscape and music as well as Robb Walsh's articles on the cuisine of Houston.

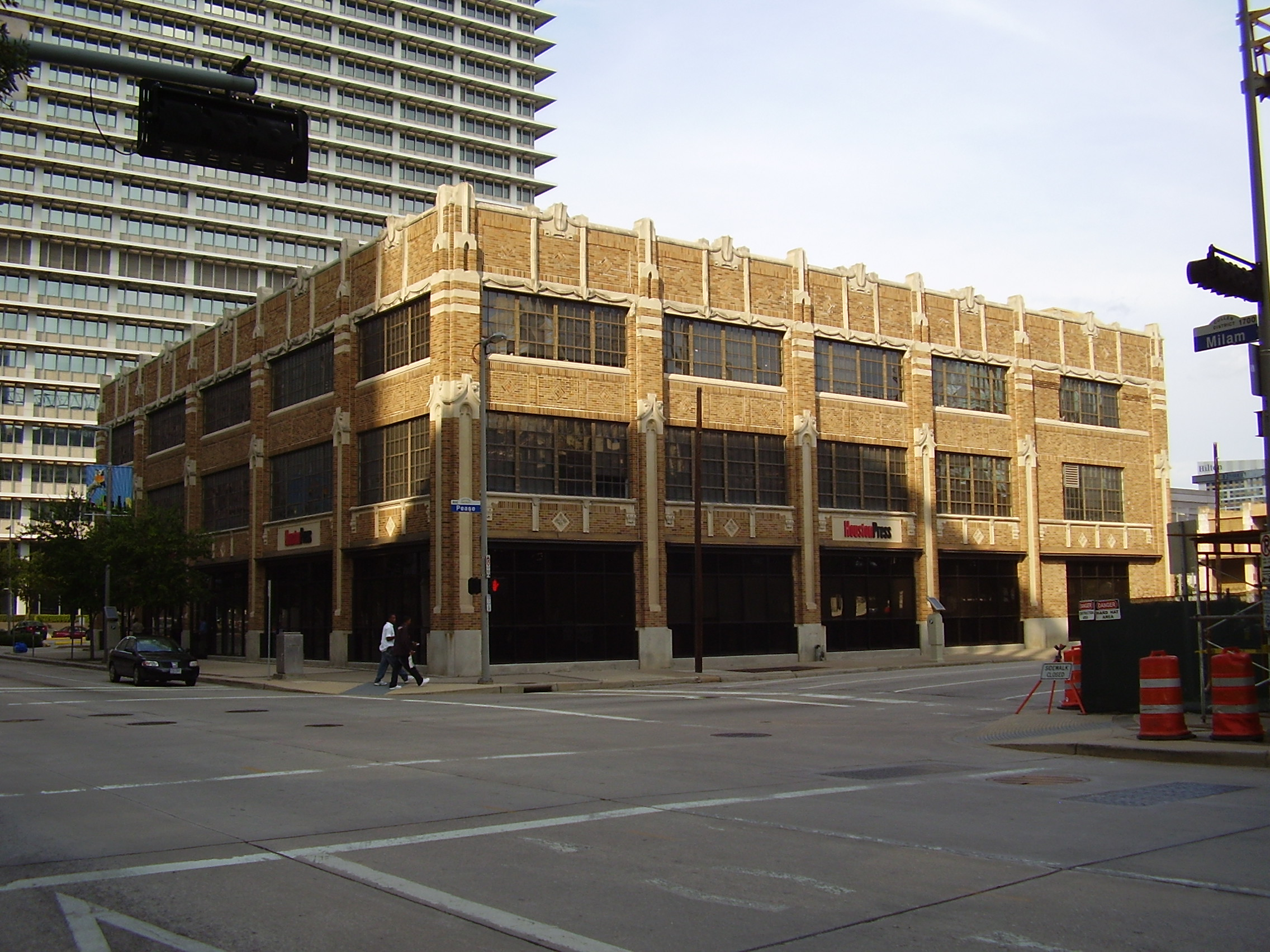
Former Houston Press headquarters in Downtown Houston

== Headquarters ==
The headquarters of the Houston Press are located in Midtown Houston on McGowen Street.

Prior to 1998, the Houston Press was located in Suite 1900 of the 2000 West Loop South building in Uptown Houston, off of the 610 Loop West Loop. In 1998, it moved to a new location in Downtown Houston, which became the Houston Press building and was originally built in 1927. That building is in close proximity to the ExxonMobil Building.

Shelor Motor Company was the building's first occupant and used it as an automobile showroom. Beginning in the 1960s, the facility served as the Gillman Pontiac dealership building. In 1994 Suzanne Sellers painted a 50-foot (15 m) by 240-foot (73 m) trompe-l'œil mural around two of the building's sides. It is visible from Leeland, Milam, and Travis streets. In 2008 the Houston Press building received damage from Hurricane Ike since the hurricane caused water to go through the parking area on the building's roof into the offices. In 2010 the Houston Press installed new energy efficient windows in place of the original glass windows on the facility's second and third floors. On the weekend after Friday October 25, 2013 the Houston Press was scheduled to move to its new offices in Midtown, then on 2603 LaBranch Street.

== See also ==
- List of newspapers in Houston
