= Sweetwater Reporter =

- Type: Daily newspaper
- Format: Broadsheet
- Owner: HPC of Texas
- Publisher: Rick Nunez
- Editor: Joseph Grant
- Founded: 1881
- Headquarters: 112 West Third, Sweetwater, Texas, 79556, United States
- Circulation: 735 (as of 2023)
- OCLC number: 14918688
- Website: www.sweetwaterreporter.com

The Sweetwater Reporter is a newspaper based in Sweetwater, Texas, covering the Nolan County area of West Texas. Owned by Horizon Publications Inc., it publishes an evening paper Sunday through Friday.

== History ==
The newspaper was founded in 1881, the same year as its city and county, as the Sweetwater Advance, by Charles Edwin Gilbert, founder of the nearby Abilene Reporter. It later published as the Nolan County Review and became the daily Reporter in 1911 under publisher John W. Millsaps and his partner W.A. Perry. In 1930, it was purchased by Harte-Hanks, which sent publisher Millard Cope to run the paper.

In 1973, Donrey Media Group bought the paper and it was sold to Community Newspaper Holdings (CNHI) in 1998. In 2001, CNHI put the Reporter up for sale along with 30 other properties, including fellow West Texas papers the Big Spring Herald and Borger News-Herald. Horizon Publications bought the three West Texas papers in 2003.
