= Sports Edition Magazine =

- Categories: Local magazine
- Frequency: Monthly
- Country: USA
- Based in: Houston
- ISSN: 1941-3564 (print); 1937-8114 (web)

Sports Edition & Entertainment Magazine is a monthly magazine published in the first week of each month in Houston, Texas.

The magazine is distributed throughout the Houston Area and covers Houston sports, such as the Houston Texans, Houston Astros, Houston Rockets, Houston Comets, Houston Dynamo, and Houston Aeros. It also covers outdoors, hunting, fishing, boating, cycling, running, exercise, health and high school sports.
