= Elgin Courier =

Newspaper in Elgin, Texas

The Elgin Courier
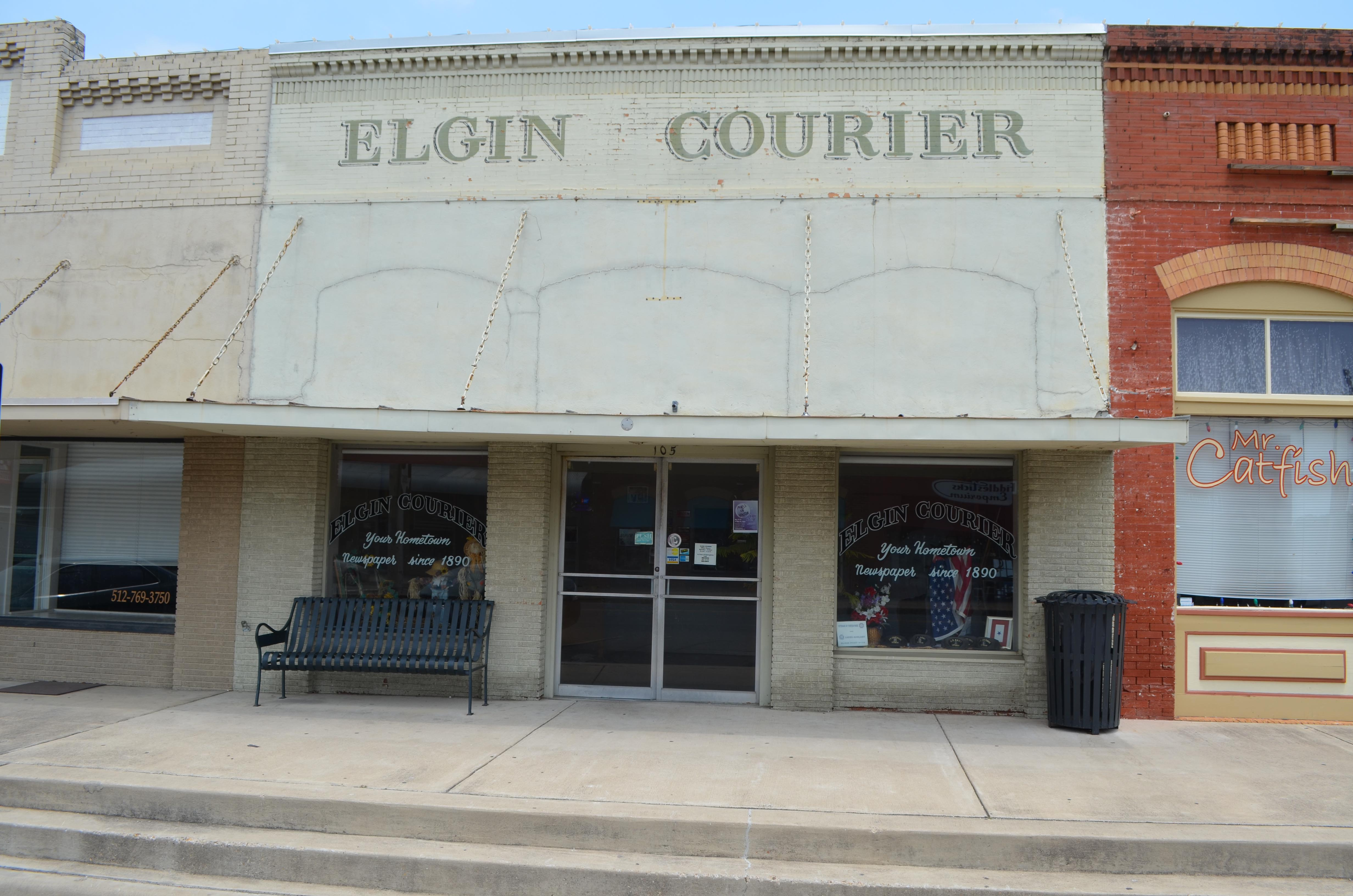
- The Elgin Courier building
- Type: Weekly newspaper
- Format: Broadsheet
- Owner(s): Granite Publications, Inc.
- Publisher: Marie Ott
- Editor: Julianne Hodges
- Founded: 1890
- Circulation: 1,743 (as of 2023)
- Website: elgincourier.com

The Elgin Courier is a newspaper in Elgin, Texas, United States.

== History ==
Founded by Miles Hill, the paper has been published on a weekly basis since 1890. Though it was not the first paper in Elgin –prior to 1890. there was The Meteor, The Times, and others – it has long been the paper of record for not just Elgin, but much of the surrounding communities of McDade, Coupland, and other areas in Bastrop County, along with The Bastrop Advertiser and media from the larger city of Austin.

The paper was purchased by Julian O. Smith in 1901, who published it until 1948, and saw it through a period of major growth. The Courier is owned by Blackland Publications, which also owns local Texas papers such as the Hill Country News, Taylor Press, and others.
