= Marion County Herald =

- Type: Weekly newspaper
- Format: Broadsheet
- Founder: V. Hugh Lewis II
- Publisher: V. Hugh Lewis II
- Founded: June 15, 2015
- Headquarters: 115 N. Polk St., Suite B Jefferson, Texas 75657
- City: Jefferson, Texas
- Country: United States
- Website: www.marioncoherald.com

The Marion County Herald (formerly Marion County Herald) is a weekly community newspaper in Jefferson, Texas. It was founded by employees of another newspaper, the Jefferson Jimplecute, who left in a dispute over pay. The first issue came out on June 19, 2015. The paper was distributed free of charge initially but restricted to paying readers starting with the third edition. The paper stopped printed versions in October 2015, moving to an online only format. The paper's focus is on local news in Marion County, Texas.

On August 21, 2020, it was announced that V. Hugh Lewis, publisher of the Marion County Herald, and Austin Lewter, a community newspaper publisher, purchased the Jefferson Jimplecute from Strube-Palmer Media. Lewis and Lewter, both having been editors of the Jimplecute at varying times in its past, partnered to acquire the publication and now operate it as co-publishers.
