= Zavala County Sentinel =

American newspaper

- Type: Weekly newspaper
- Format: Broadsheet
- Owner(s): Annie Lee Amescua, Nelly Fernandez, Juan Fernandez
- Editor: Annie Lee Amescua, Nelly Fernandez, Juan Fernandez
- Founded: 1913
- Headquarters: 202 E. Nuece St. Crystal City, Texas 78839
- Circulation: 1,651 (as of 2023)
- Website: www.zcsentinel.com

The Zavala County Sentinel is a weekly local newspaper circulated throughout Zavala County, Texas and part of Uvalde County, Texas. The Crystal City-based newspaper was founded by J. H. Hardy in La Pryor, Texas, and began operations in May 1913. The newspaper circulates through Crystal City, Uvalde, Batesville, and La Pryor.

== Origin ==
John Hatcher Hardy established the newspaper in La Pryor, Texas in May 1913. In July 1926, the paper moved to Crystal City, Texas. In 1954, the newspaper was purchased by Dale Barker. In 2000, the paper was purchased by Amelia and Tomas Aguilar from the Barker family. In 2010, the newspaper was owned by Rick Sanchez and Jerry Mata until 2018. The paper is currently under the ownership of Annie Lee Amescua, Nelly Fernandez and Juan Fernandez.
