= Mount Pleasant Tribune =

American newspaper

- Type: Weekly newspaper
- Format: Broadsheet
- Owner: Times Media Group
- Editor-in-chief: Alicia Venter (Senior Managing Editor)
- Founded: 1941
- Headquarters: 411 W. Ferguson Road. Mount Pleasant, TX 75686; United States
- Circulation: 900 (as of 2023)
- Website: tribnow.com

Mount Pleasant Tribune (formerly Mount Pleasant Daily Tribune) is a weekly newspaper based in Mount Pleasant, Texas, United States, serving the city of Mount Pleasant, Texas, as well as all of Titus County, Camp County and Morris County. It is owned by Times Media Group.

== History ==
The paper traces its roots back to a paper called The Patron, published in 1872 by W. J. Johnson. The paper changed named many times; it was called The Times Review in 1883 and consolidated with The Daily Hustler in 1924, to form The Daily Times.

C. E. Palmer and his associates with The Texarkana Gazette started a daily paper in 1939 called the Mount Pleasant Daily News. In 1940, the name was changed to the Titus County Tribune, and became a weekly publication.

J. Frank Palmer and his two sons purchased the Titus County Tribune in 1941, and in 1972 purchased The Daily Times, merging the papers into the Mount Pleasant Daily Tribune. In 1960, the Daily Times broke with 41 years of tradition to endorse a Republican, Richard Nixon, over the Democratic nominee, John F. Kennedy.

In 2014, Granite Publications bought the newspaper from Bob Palmer. The Daily Tribune was one of only thirteen family-owned and operated newspapers in Texas as of 2012. Granite Publications ended the daily frequency taking the paper to semi-weekly in January, 2017, Wednesdays and Saturdays. In August 2017 the Tribune was acquired by Northeast Texas Publishing, LP.

In 2024, the Tribune changed to a weekly newspaper, publishing on Wednesdays.
