= Pilot Point Post-Signal =

Weekly newspaper in Pilot Point, Texas, US

- Type: Weekly newspaper
- Format: Broadsheet
- Owner(s): Lewis Newspapers, Inc.
- Publisher: David Lewis
- Editor: Abigail Allen
- Founded: 1878
- Language: American English
- Headquarters: Pilot Point, Denton County, Texas
- Country: United States
- Circulation: 1,700 (as of 2023)
- OCLC number: 17435498
- Website: postsignal.com

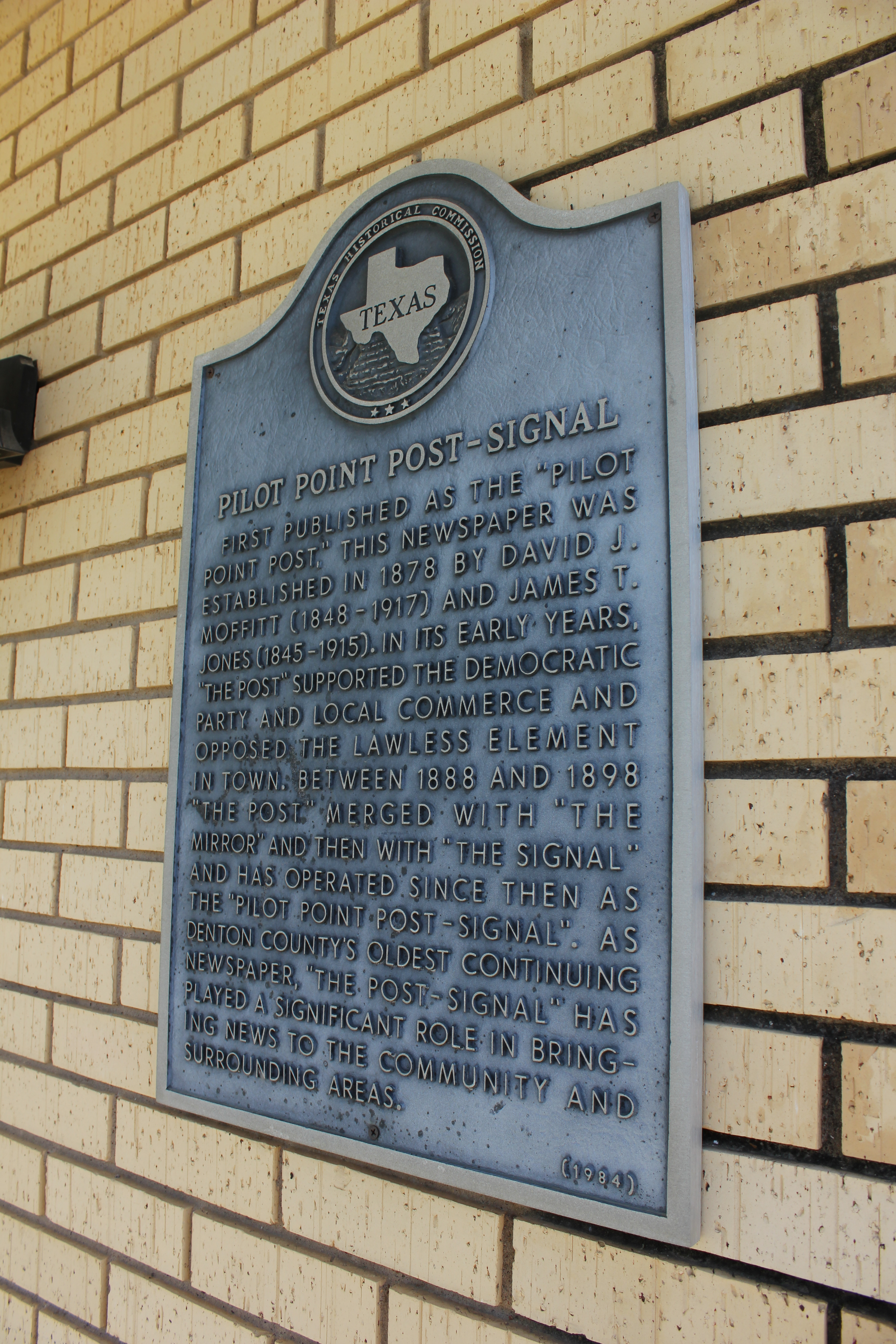
Pilot Point Post-Signal Texas Historical Marker

The Pilot Point Post-Signal (Post-Signal since 1980) is an American, English language weekly newspaper published in the town of Pilot Point in Denton County, Texas. The paper is owned by Lewis Newspapers, Inc. is published once a week on Friday.

== History ==
The Post-Signal is Denton County's oldest continuously published newspaper. The Pilot Point Post, owned and operated by David Jesse Moffitt and James Taliaferro Jones, began publishing in 1878 after several earlier attempts to establish a newspaper in the area had failed. By 1890, Moffitt had become the sole owner. Moffitt then began a new partnership with J.L. Harper, the founder of the Pilot Point Signal. In 1900, the papers combined and became known as the Pilot Point Post-Signal.

In 1970, the paper was purchased by Ralph Cole, who upgraded equipment and expanded circulation before selling the paper in 1974.

In 1974 the paper was purchased by its current owners, David and Pam Lewis. It is the official newspaper for the cities of Pilot Point, Aubrey, Krugerville, Providence Village, and Cross Roads, and has won more publishing awards than any weekly newspaper in the area.
