= Austin Times Herald =

American newspaper

The Austin Times Herald was a weekly newspaper published in Austin, Texas from 1960 to 1963.

The 24-page newspaper was published on an offset press in third-party commercial print shops and appeared on Thursdays.

Publisher J.A. Newborn Jr., who also founded Austin radio station KASE-FM, promised an "independent newspaper, standing for programs rather than parties". Newspaper staff included city editor Wray Weddell, statehouse columnist Hugh Williamson, sports editor Dick Fowler, and sports writers Curtis Bishop and Tom Murray. The advertising manager was George Atkins and the company vice president was Eugene M. Cain.

The Times Herald printed dispatches from the Chicago Tribune, New York Daily News and New York Herald-Tribune press services, North American Newspaper Alliance, Central Press, London Observer, Reuters, Australian News Service, Newspaper Enterprise Association and King Features. Syndicated columnists included Fulton Lewis Jr., Eric Sevareid and Ralph McGill.

The newspaper offices were initially located at the Commodore Perry Hotel.
