= Big Spring Herald =

Newspaper in Texas

- Type: Daily newspaper
- Format: Broadsheet
- Owner: HPC of Texas
- Publisher: Rick Nunez
- Founded: 1904
- Language: English
- Headquarters: 710 Scurry, Big Spring, Texas 79720, United States
- Circulation: 1,401 (as of 2023)
- Sister newspapers: Sweetwater Reporter, Borger News Herald, Guymon News Herald
- ISSN: 0746-6811
- Website: bigspringherald.com

The Big Spring Herald is a newspaper based in Big Spring, Texas, covering the Howard County area of West Texas. It published on weekday afternoons and Sunday mornings. It is owned by Horizon Publications Inc.

== History ==
The Herald was founded as a weekly in 1904 by brothers-in-law Tom Jordan and W.G. Hayden and became a daily in 1928. In 1929, Harte-Hanks Newspapers bought the paper.

In 2001, Community Newspaper Holdings put the Herald up for sale along with 30 other properties, including fellow West Texas papers the Borger News-Herald and Sweetwater Reporter. Horizon Publications bought the three West Texas papers in 2003.
