= Borger News-Herald =

Newspaper in Borger, Texas, USA

- Type: Daily newspaper
- Format: Broadsheet
- Owner: Horizon Publications
- Founder: David M. Warren Sr.
- Publisher: Rick Nunez
- Editor: Jessica Ozbun
- Founded: 1926
- Headquarters: 207 N. Main, Borger, Texas, 79007, United States
- Circulation: 435 (as of 2023)
- OCLC number: 14053261
- Website: borgernewsherald.com

The Borger News–Herald is a newspaper based in Borger, Texas, covering the Hutchinson County area of West Texas. Owned by Horizon Publications Inc., it publishes Monday through Saturday.

== History ==
The newspaper was founded as the Hutchinson County Herald in 1926 by David M. Warren Sr., who sold it to oilman Roy Whittenburg in 1946. In 1956, Whittenburg sold it to his brother-in-law, W. Glynn Morris. After Morris' retirement in 1977, Jimmy Allison became publisher

In 1978, Donrey Media Group bought the paper and Donald W. Reynolds became publisher. The company sold the newspaper to Community Newspaper Holdings (CNHI) in 1998. In 2001, CNHI put the News-Herald up for sale along with 30 other properties, including fellow West Texas papers the Big Spring Herald and Sweetwater Reporter. Horizon Publications bought the three West Texas papers in 2003.
