= Peoples Press (Port Neches, Texas) =

The Peoples Press was a weekly newspaper in Port Neches, Texas, published from 1919 to 1932 and owned by Peoples Press, Incorporated. Its circulation was reported as 800 in 1924 and 750 from 1925 to 1928.

== Editors ==
- Marvin Brown (1925)
- Carl White (1925–31) (also editor of another weekly newspaper of the same name in Port Arthur
- W. H. Fortney (1932)
