= Mach Song =

Bilingual Vietnamese–English newspaper

Mach Song (Vietnamese: Mạch Sống, literally "Life Stream") is a national monthly bilingual Vietnamese–English newspaper published in Houston, Texas. The paper has a readership of approximately 75,000 in 15 cities across the United States and is published by Boat People SOS—a national Vietnamese American 501(c)(3) nonprofit organization. Working through over 100 media partners, Mach Song Monthly can reach approximately half of the total Vietnamese households across the country, mainly in areas with large Vietnamese concentrations. Through Mach Song Monthly's own means of mass and small media, they can reach approximately one-fourth of the total Vietnamese households, focusing primarily on population segments not reached by their media partners. On certain issues, Mach Song Media mobilizes local faith and community organizations to reach deep into their constituencies. So far, they have worked with over 200 such organizations on various issues and have the capacity to reach 1,000 faith and community organizations in the Vietnamese communities across the US.

Boat People SOS has invested over 1 million dollars to develop its own network of Vietnamese-language mass media. This network includes Mach Song's monthly publication, radio programs, and its television programs. In the aftermath of Hurricane Katrina (2005), Mach Song monthly printed 50,000 additional copies for six months for distribution to hurricane victims. They similarly increased the circulation of Mach Song monthly after Hurricane Ike (2008).
