= Austin Sun =

Counterculture newspaper

The Austin Sun
- Type: Alternative
- Format: Biweekly Tabloid
- Founder(s): Jeff Nightbyrd and Michael Eakin
- Publisher: Austin Sun Pub. Co.
- Managing editor: J. David Moriarty
- Founded: October 17, 1974; 51 years ago
- Ceased publication: June 29, 1978; 47 years ago
- Relaunched: 2016
- City: Austin, Texas

The Austin Sun was a biweekly counterculture newspaper that was published in Austin, Texas, between 1974 and 1978.

The publication was similar in nature to Rolling Stone during the latter's formative years. The Austin Sun was instrumental in advancing the careers of many musical artists, including Stevie Ray Vaughan, Joe Ely, Marcia Ball, and Butch Hancock. It also covered the first American performances of Elvis Costello, at the Armadillo World Headquarters; and the Sex Pistols, in San Antonio.

The Austin Sun was notable for being the newspaper that started the careers of many persons who later became well-known in journalism and other media. Core former Sun staff members were involved with the publications LA Weekly and The Austin Chronicle.

== Publication history ==
The Austin Sun was co-founded by Jeff Nightbyrd (formerly Jeff Shero), who had been the editor of The Rat in New York City and associated with The Rag underground newspaper in Austin. Nightbyrd established the paper with Michael Eakin, (Note: Michael Eakin was murdered in Houston in 1979. His murder remains unsolved.) a former editor at The Daily Texan, the student newspaper of the University of Texas at Austin. They were later joined by J. David Moriarty as managing editor, and considered to be the only person at the paper with business expertise.

Unlike underground newspapers (and despite being so categorized by the Library of Congress), which published much counterculture social and political commentary by volunteer contributors, the Austin Sun was intended to be a commercially viable enterprise, with formal advertising programs and paid staff positions.

The paper's first issue was published on October 17, 1974.

Despite intentions of commercial viability, most staff members of the Austin Sun needed to have full-time jobs elsewhere to provide for themselves. Jeff Nightbyrd regularly offered employees stock in lieu of salaries, though the stock, being printed paper in relation to a private company, bore no relationship to the actual value of the business. (Note: As stated by Bill Hood, a former Austin Sun photographer and later the paper's art director.)

The Austin Sun published its last issue on June 29, 1978.

== Legacy ==
Following the cessation of publication of the Austin Sun in 1978, several of its writers — Michael Ventura, Ginger Varney, Bill Bentley, and "Big Boy" Medlin — relocated to Los Angeles, forming the core first editorial group of the LA Weekly, which commenced publication that same year. Some of those same writers, such as Ventura and Bentley, became key contributors to The Austin Chronicle when it commenced publication in 1981. Both the LA Weekly and the Austin Chronicle continue to publish; both also remain associated with persons who were originally with the Austin Sun.

The social and cultural impact of the Austin Sun is recognized through the publication being indexed by the Library of Congress. (Note: The Austin Sun is also included as part of the Alternative Press Collection of the University of California, Santa Barbara, as well as through ongoing reunion activities.)

A reunion of Austin Sun staff members was held in October 2009. A website was established by former staff members Bill Hood and Deborah Stall Nelson, where former staff members and readers of the Austin Sun regularly shared recollections and updates.

Protection of the Austin Sun name appears to have been lost, in that for many years the name was used by a news aggregation site run by the World News Network, with no evident association with the original Austin Sun ownership.

== 2016 relaunch ==
In June 2016, the Austin Sun was relaunched as a website in the spirit of the original publication. Founding Sun writers Bill Bentley, James BigBoy Medlin, and Michael Ventura were contributors to the new site, along with original art directors Dan Hubig and Carlene Brady. The relaunched Austin Sun has not been updated or posted new content since the spring of 2021.
