= The Bastrop Advertiser =

Bastrop Advertiser
- Type: Weekly newspaper
- Owner: Hearst Communications
- Editor: Andy Sevilla
- Founded: 1853
- Headquarters: 8000 Metropolis Dr., Building A. Suite 100 Austin, TX 78744
- Circulation: 601 (as of 2023)
- Website: statesman.com/bastrop

The Bastrop Advertiser is a weekly newspaper covering Bastrop, Texas, and wider Bastrop County. Founded in 1853, it is one of the oldest continually operating weeklies in Texas, and along with papers such as the Elgin Courier, is considered the newspaper of record for some of the small rural towns in the greater Austin region.
