= The Austin Chronicle =

American newspaper

- The Austin Chronicle (July 14, 2017)
- Type: Alternative weekly
- Format: Tabloid
- Owner: Austin Chronicle Corp.
- Editor: Kimberley Jones
- Founded: 1981
- Headquarters: 4000 N I H 35; Austin, Texas 78751; US
- Circulation: 65,000
- ISSN: 1074-0740
- OCLC number: 8620367
- Website: austinchronicle.com

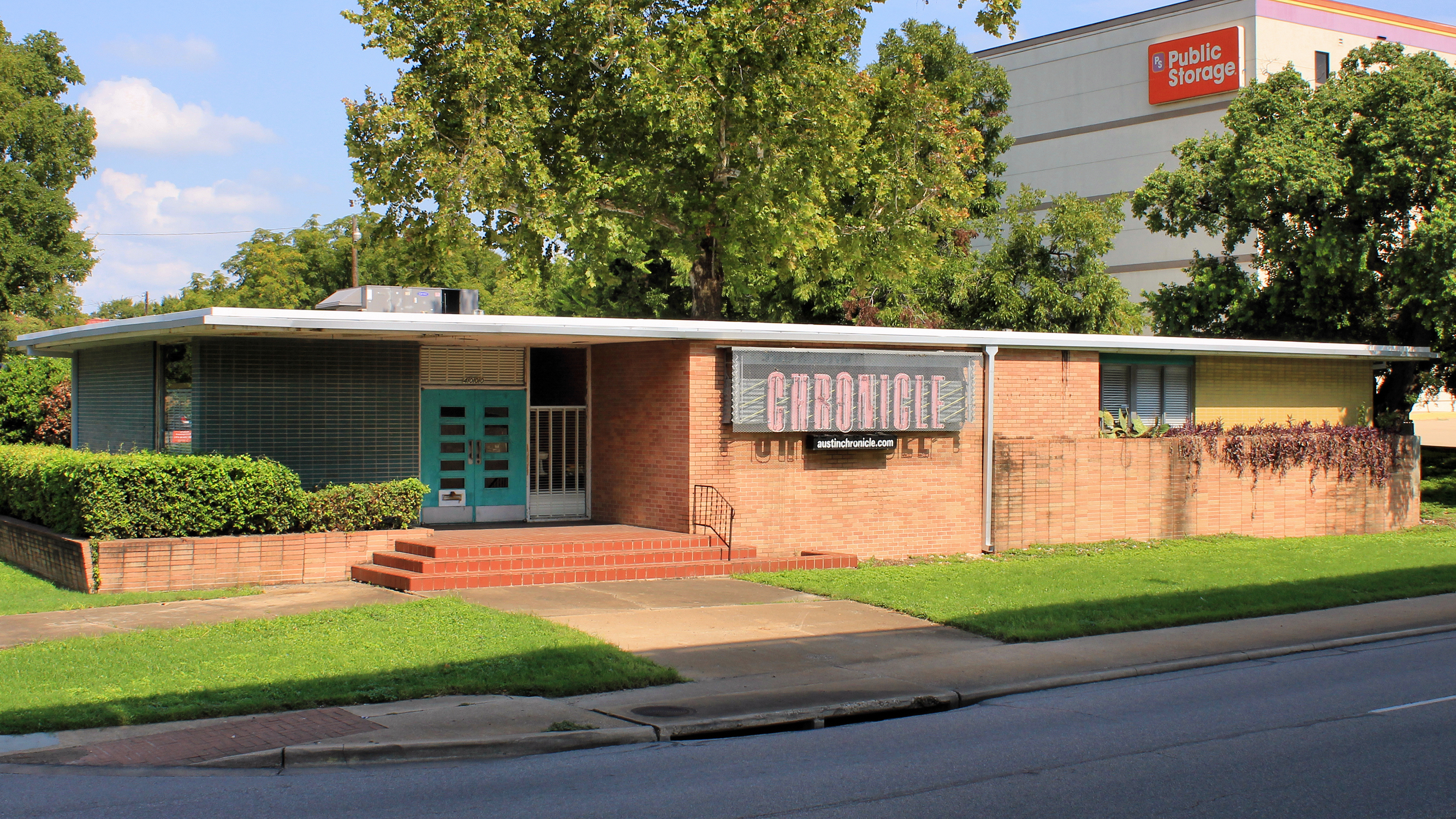
The Austin Chronicle headquarters

The Austin Chronicle is an alternative weekly newspaper published every Thursday in Austin, Texas, United States. The paper is distributed through free news-stands, often at local eateries or coffee houses frequented by its targeted demographic. In 2001, the newspaper reported a weekly readership of 545,500. It is part of the Association of Alternative Newsmedia and it emulates the typical publications of the 1960s counterculture movement.

== History ==
The Chronicle was co-founded in 1981 by Nick Barbaro and Louis Black, with assistance from others who largely met through the graduate film studies program at the University of Texas at Austin. Barbaro and Black are also co-founders of the South by Southwest Festival, although the festival operates as a separate company. The paper initially was published bi-weekly, and later weekly.

Its precursor in style and format was the Austin Sun, a bi-weekly that had ceased operations in 1978, after four years of publication. The first issue of the Chronicle was distributed on September 4, 1981.

With a progressive point of view and irreverent voice, the Chronicle covers local and state news as well as the Austin food, film, theater, art and music communities. The paper also has a number of annual features, including the "Best of Austin" Awards and "Best of Austin: Restaurants" Awards, cut-out masks for Halloween, and the April Fools' edition. The Chronicle produces the annual Austin Chronicle Hot Sauce Festival, normally held in early September.

In March 2025, Nick Barbaro, who was publisher for the past 43 years, retired. Cassidy Frazier has been named as the new publisher. Barbaro will remain as president of the Austin Chronicle Corporation.

== Characteristics of its working methods ==
It is a profit-oriented business that receives income from advertisements. The newspaper endorses electoral candidates and its reporters check official sources.
