= Frontier Town (radio show) =

Frontier Town was an American radio adventure serial syndicated by Bruce Eells Productions. The 30-minute programme's first known broadcast was in 1949, and the show ran for 47 episodes. Because it was syndicated, it aired on different stations on different days. For instance, in New York City, the first episode ran on WINS on March 5, 1949.

== Characters and story description ==
Chad Remington's quest to bring his father's killer to justice served as a springboard for a career as a crime fighting attorney in the small town of Dos Rios.

Remington was played initially by Jeff Chandler, billed as Tex Chandler. Halfway through the program's run, the role was assumed by Reed Hadley. Wild Bill Elliott was originally planned as the star according to an early news story. Remington's sidekick, Cherokee O'Bannon, was played by Wade Crosby using the speech patterns of W.C. Fields.

The series was written and directed by Paul Franklin. Ivan Ditmars and Bob Mitchell provided the background organ music.

== Opening intro ==
Each episode opened with the following text:

"Frontier Town, the saga of the roaring West (organ music) Frontier Town... (sounds of men whooping and horse beats) Here is the Adventure Story of the Early West, the tamed and the untamed, from Cheyenne to Calgary, from Dodge City to Poker Flats. These are the towns they fought to live in and lived to fight for, teeming crucibles of pioneer freedom. Frontier Town!"

== See also ==
- Death Valley Days
- Gene Autry's Melody Ranch
- Hopalong Cassidy (radio program)
- The Roy Rogers Show
