= Blodgett, Texas =

Unincorporated community in Texas, US

Blodgett
- Unincorporated community
- Location in Texas
- Coordinates: 33°04′06″N 95°06′32″W
- Country: United States
- State: Texas
- Texas: Titus
- Named for: John F. Blodgett
- Elevation: 410 ft (120 m)

Population (2000)
  - Total: 60
- USGS Feature ID: 1378020

Blodgett, formerly Liberty, is an unincorporated community in Titus County, Texas, United States.

== History ==
Blodgett is situated on a junction of Farm to Market Road 21 and 127. The town was established in the late 1800s, and was known as Liberty. A post office operated from September 22, 1903, to September 14, 1905, being rerouted to Winfield. The name was changed because of the existence of Liberty, Texas, and was renamed to Blodgett, after the first postmaster John F. Blodgett.

A church and school were constructed in the early 1900s. The church was destroyed by a tornado on April 9, 1919, and was rebuilt. The school was consolidated with the Mount Pleasant Independent School District by the 1960s. The town gained activity in the 1980s after Lake Bob Sandlin State Park opened nearby. As of 2000, the town has a population of 60.
