= Sam W. Russell =

American politician

Sam W. Russell (August 31, 1945 – May 14, 2014) was an American lawyer and politician.

Born in Mount Pleasant, Texas, to George Traylor Russell and Arlene Wilson Russell, he received his bachelor's degree from East Texas State University and his law degree from South Texas College of Law and then practiced law in Mount Pleasant, Texas. Russell served in the Texas House of Representatives from 1983 until 1992 as a Democrat. He resigned to become legislative liaison for Governor Ann Richards and later was a lobbyist in Austin, Texas. Russell moved back to Mount Pleasant and was elected Titus County, Texas county judge in 2006. He died in Mount Pleasant, Texas.
