= Mount Pleasant High School (Texas) =

Location
- 2110 N Edwards Ave. Mount Pleasant, (Titus County), Texas 75455; United States
- Coordinates: 33.17728°N 94.99028°W

Information
- School type: Public, High School
- School district: Mount Pleasant Independent School District
- Principal: Craig Bailey
- Teaching staff: 122.22 (FTE)
- Grades: 9–12
- Enrollment: 1,545 (2023–2024)
- Student to teacher ratio: 12.64
- Colors: Black; Gold
- Athletics conference: UIL Class AAAAA
- Mascot: Tigers/Lady Tigers
- Website: www.mpisd.net/mphs/

Mount Pleasant High School is a public high school located in Mount Pleasant, Texas (USA) and classified as a 5A school by the UIL. It is part of the Mount Pleasant Independent School District located in central Titus County. In 2015, the school was rated "Met Standard" by the Texas Education Agency.

The school serves students from Mount Pleasant, Winfield, and Millers Cove. Until the Winfield Independent School District dissolved in 2018 and merged into Mount Pleasant ISD, Mount Pleasant High was designated to serve high school students from Winfield ISD territory, including Winfield and Millers Cove.

== Athletics ==
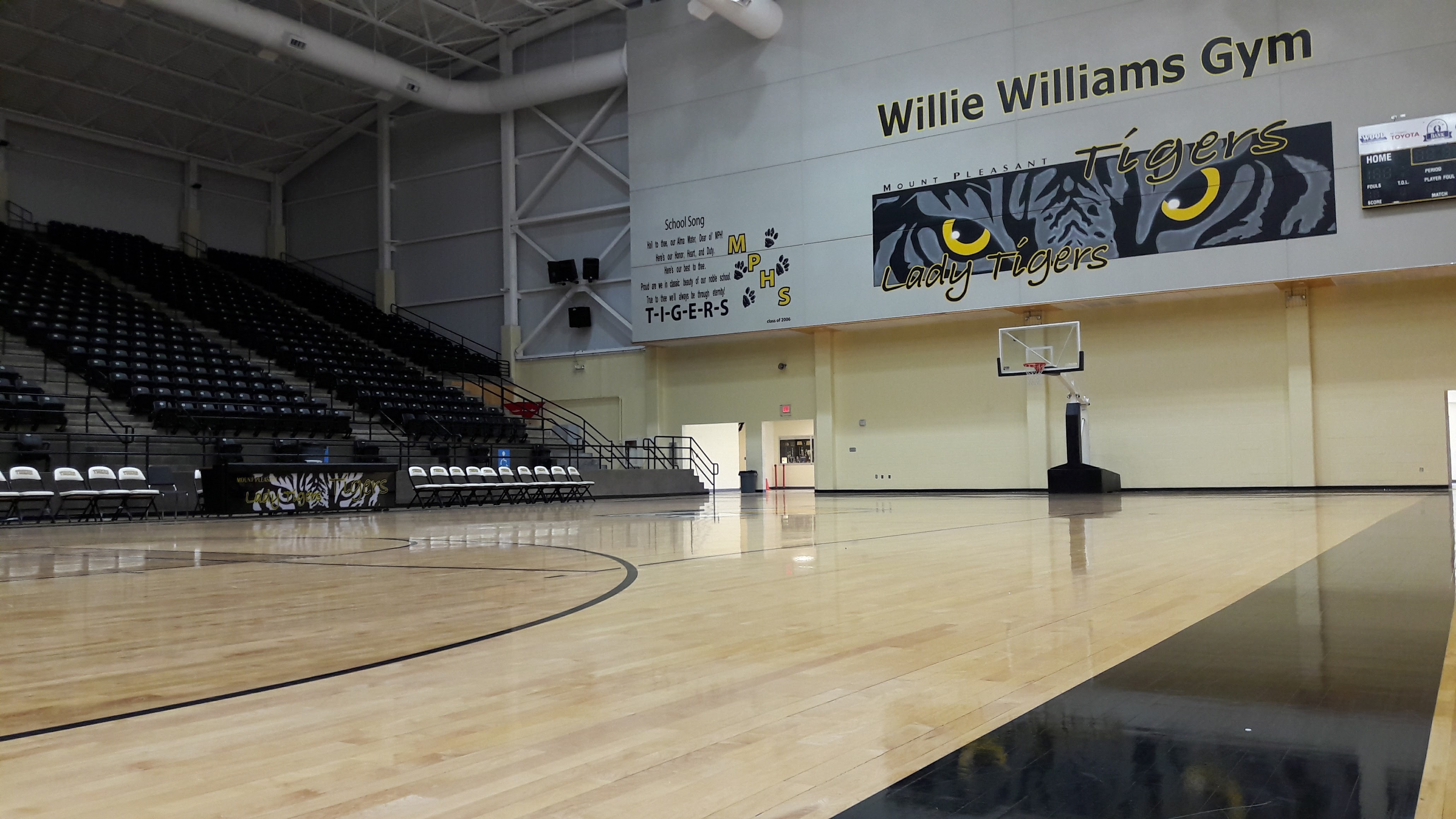
Willie Williams Gym in Mount Pleasant High School.

The Mount Pleasant Tigers compete in the following sports -

Cross Country, Volleyball, Football, Basketball, Swimming, Powerlifting, Soccer, Golf, Tennis, Track, Softball & Baseball

=== State Titles ===
- Baseball -
  - 1978(3A), 1993(4A)
- Boys Track -
  - 1972(3A) State Meet - First Place (team members: Gary Miracle, Barry Hamilton, Lewis Spencer, Billy Keefer, Amos Rockwell, Richard Rockwell, Randall Huggins, Johnny Greene)
  - 1972(3A) One-Mile Relay - First Place (team members: Amos Rockwell, Billy Keefer, Richard Rockwell, Lewis Spencer)

==== State Finalists ====
- Football -
  - 1973(3A)
- Soccer
  - 2006(4A) 2012(5A)
- Golf (individual competition)
  - 1972(3A)
    - Greg Heinz (1972 Region II, Class 3A Golf Medalist) [after tying Dave Parker of Stephenville in regulation play, Heinz claimed Medalist honors by winning the sudden-death playoff with a birdie on the first playoff hole]
- Golf (team competition)
  - 1971(3A) (team members: Jimmy Bedsole, Allen Clay, Greg Heinz, Philip Roach and George Toledo)
  - 1972(3A) (team members: Jimmy Bedsole, Greg Heinz, Rusty Hurse, Philip Roach and George Toledo)
- Tennis (doubles)
  - 1972(3A) (brothers Robin Roberts and Landy Roberts)
- Tennis (singles)
  - 1971(3A) (Gary Roberts)
- Track (220-Yard Dash)
  - 1972(3A) Third Place (Lewis Spencer)
- Track (440-Yard Relay)
  - 1971(3A) Fifth Place (team members: Barry Hamilton, Billy Keefer, Amos Rockwell, Jerry Shurtleff)
  - 1972(3A) Second Place (team members: Amos Rockwell, Barry Hamilton, Billy Keefer, Lewis Spencer)
- Track (High Jump)
  - 1972(3A) Fourth Place (Gary Miracle)
- Powerlifting (Boys)
  - 2016(5A) 15th place (Lifter: Pablo Gutierrez) 2017(5A) 21st place and 8th place (Pablo Gutierrez and Andrew Turner)

== Notable alumni ==
- Maury Buford, former NFL punter
- K.D. Cannon, former NFL receiver
- Louie Gohmert (1971), Member of the U.S. House of Representatives from Texas's 1st district.
- Michael Kopech, professional baseball player for the Chicago White Sox
- Barry Minter, former NFL linebacker
- Chaun Thompson, former NFL linebacker
