= Bridges Chapel, Texas =

Unincorporated community in Texas, US

Bridges Chapel
- Unincorporated community
- Location in Texas
- Coordinates: 33°15′39″N 95°02′49″W
- Country: United States
- State: Texas
- County: Titus
- Elevation: 420 ft (130 m)

Population (2000)
  - Total: 90
- USGS Feature ID: 2034758

Bridges Chapel is an unincorporated community in Titus County, Texas, United States.

== History ==
Bridges Chapel is situated on U.S. Route 271. It emerged after the American Civil War when a Methodist church was constructed. He town was named for Relious Bridges, who donated land for the church. A school was built in 1870, and another was built for Black children by 1932. They were later was consolidated with the Mount Pleasant Independent School District. By 2000, the town had a population of 90.
