= Winfield School District =

Winfield School District may refer to:

- Winfield Unified School District 465 (Kansas)
- Winfield R-IV School District (Missouri)
- Winfield Independent School District (Texas)
