= Cookville, Texas =

Cookville
- Unincorporated community
- Location within the state of Texas Cookville (the United States)
- Coordinates: 33°11′8″N 94°51′16″W
- Country: United States
- State: Texas
- County: Titus
- Elevation: 433 ft (132 m)
- Time zone: UTC-6 (Central (CST))
  - Summer (DST): UTC-5 (CDT)
- ZIP codes: 75558
- Area codes: 903, 430
- GNIS feature ID: 1333275

Cookville is an unincorporated community in eastern Titus County, Texas, United States. It lies along U.S. Route 67, east of the city of Mount Pleasant, the county seat of Titus County. Although Cookville is unincorporated, it has a post office, with the ZIP code of 75558, located at the junction of US 67 and Farm to Market Road 1000.
