= Marshall Springs, Texas =

Unincorporated community in Texas, US

Coordinates: 33°13′19″N 95°04′51″W

Marshall Springs is an unincorporated community in Titus County, in the U.S. state of Texas. Marshall Springs is seven miles northwest of the county seat, Mount Pleasant, located on two county roads, and with no reliable source of history, lacks a known population figure.
