= National Register of Historic Places listings in Titus County, Texas =

Location of Titus County in Texas

This is a list of the National Register of Historic Places listings in Titus County, Texas.

This is intended to be a complete list of properties and districts listed on the National Register of Historic Places in Titus County, Texas. There is one property listed on the National Register in the county.

This National Park Service list is complete through NPS recent listings posted March 21, 2025.

== Current listings ==
The publicly disclosed locations of National Register properties may be seen in a mapping service provided.

	Name on the Register	Image	Date listed	Location	City or town	Description
1	Hale Mound Site	Hale Mound Site	July 7, 1990 (#90000983)	Address restricted	Winfield	Smithsonian trinomial 41TT12

== See also ==
- National Register of Historic Places listings in Texas
- Recorded Texas Historic Landmarks in Titus County
