= Argo, Texas =

Unincorporated community in Texas, US

Argo
- Unincorporated community
- Location in Texas
- Coordinates: 33°15′18″N 94°53′42″W
- Country: United States
- State: Texas
- County: Titus
- Elevation: 374 ft (114 m)

Population (1990)
  - Total: 26
- USGS Feature ID: 1380819

Argo is an unincorporated community in Titus County, Texas, United States.

== History ==
Argo is situated on Farm to Market Road 1001. The town emerged in the 1880s. A post office operated from 1895 to 1907. It operated in the general store of the first postmaster, James S. Rountree. By 1890, the town was used as a trading center for farmers north of Mount Pleasant. By 1990, the population was 26.
