= Vivian Fowler =

Vivian Fowler may refer to:

- Vivian Fowler Elementary, part of the Mount Pleasant Independent School District, in Mount Pleasant, Texas
- Vivian Fowler Memorial College for Girls, in Lagos, Nigeria
