= Chapel Hill Independent School District =

Chapel Hill Independent School District may refer to:

- Chapel Hill Independent School District (Smith County, Texas)
- Chapel Hill Independent School District (Titus County, Texas)
