= Titus County, Texas =

County in Texas, US

- County
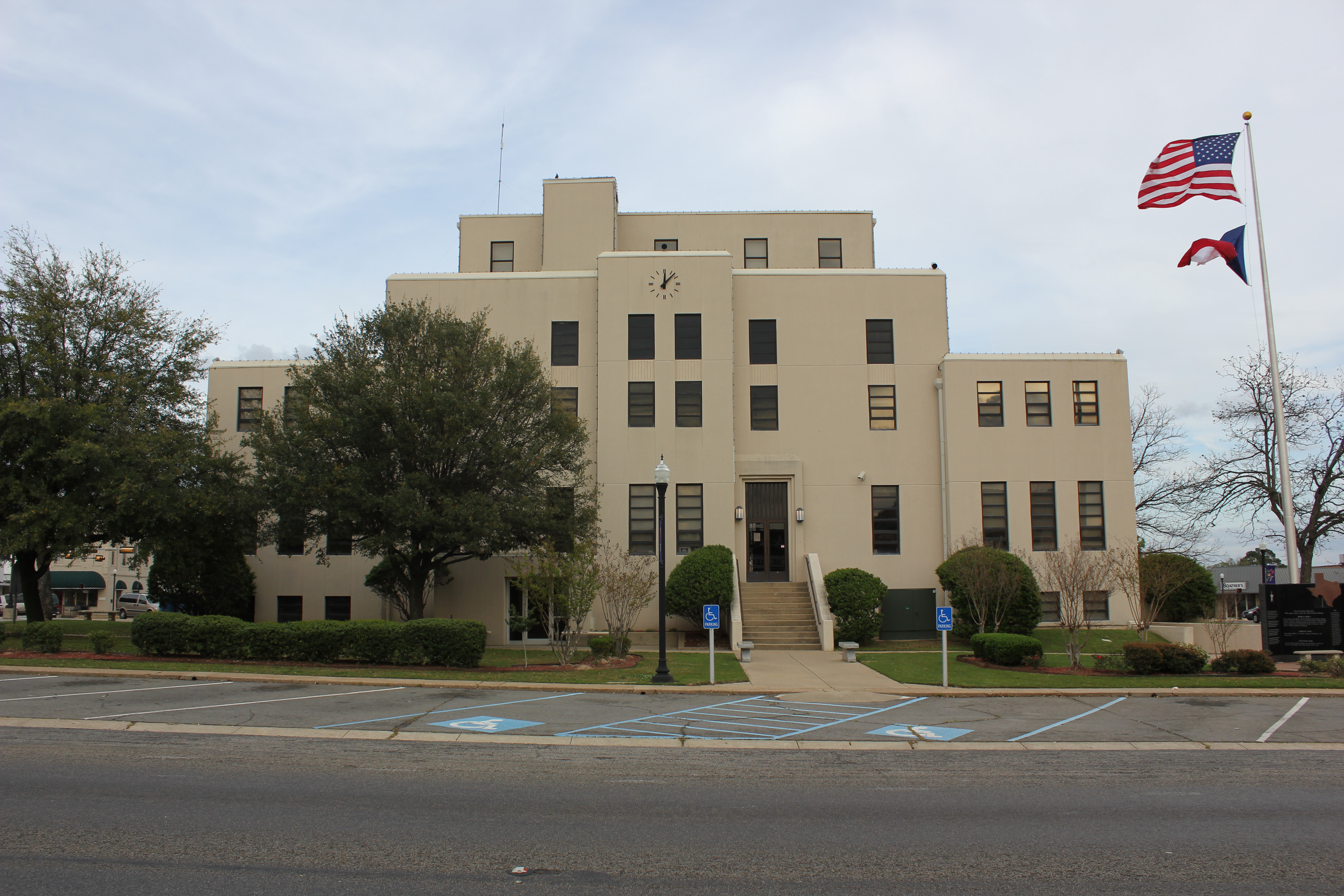
- The Titus County Courthouse (1895) in Mount Pleasant

- Seal

- Location within the U.S. state of Texas
- Coordinates: 33°13′N 94°58′W
- Country: United States
- State: Texas
- Founded: 1846
- Named for: Andrew Jackson Titus
- Seat: Mount Pleasant
- Largest city: Mount Pleasant

Area
  - Total: 426 sq mi (1,100 km^{2})
  - Land: 406 sq mi (1,050 km^{2})
  - Water: 20 sq mi (52 km^{2}) 4.6%

Population (2020)
  - Total: 31,247
  - Estimate (2025): 31,563 ▲
  - Density: 77.0/sq mi (29.7/km^{2})
- Time zone: UTC−6 (Central)
  - Summer (DST): UTC−5 (CDT)
- Congressional district: 1st
- Website: www.co.titus.tx.us

Titus County is a county located in the northeastern region of the U.S. state of Texas. As of the 2020 census, its population was 31,247. Its county seat is Mount Pleasant. The county is named for Andrew Jackson Titus, an early settler. Titus County comprises the Mount Pleasant micropolitan statistical area along side neighboring Camp County.

== Geography ==
According to the U.S. Census Bureau, the county has a total area of 426 square miles (1,100 km^{2}), of which 20 square miles (52 km^{2}) (4.6%) are covered by water.

=== Major highways ===
- Interstate 30
- U.S. Highway 67
- U.S. Highway 271
- State Highway 11
- State Highway 49
- Loop 96
- Spur 134
- Spur 185

=== Adjacent counties ===
- Red River County (north)
- Morris County (east)
- Camp County (south)
- Franklin County (west)

== Communities ==
=== Cities ===
- Mount Pleasant (county seat)
- Talco
- Winfield

=== Town ===
- Miller's Cove

=== Unincorporated communities ===
- Argo
- Blodgett
- Bridges Chapel
- Cookville
- Green Hill
- Maple Springs
- Marshall Springs
- Midway
- Monticello
- Wilkinson
- White Oak

== Demographics ==
Historical population
Census	Pop.	Note	%±
1850	3,636		—
1860	9,648		165.3%
1870	11,339		17.5%
1880	5,959		−47.4%
1890	8,190		37.4%
1900	12,292		50.1%
1910	16,422		33.6%
1920	18,128		10.4%
1930	16,003		−11.7%
1940	19,228		20.2%
1950	17,302		−10.0%
1960	16,785		−3.0%
1970	16,702		−0.5%
1980	21,442		28.4%
1990	24,009		12.0%
2000	28,118		17.1%
2010	32,334		15.0%
2020	31,247		−3.4%
2025 (est.)	31,563	▲	1.0%
U.S. Decennial Census; 1850–2010 2010–2020

=== Racial and ethnic composition ===
Titus County, Texas – Racial and ethnic composition Note: the US Census treats Hispanic/Latino as an ethnic category. This table excludes Latinos from the racial categories and assigns them to a separate category. Hispanics/Latinos may be of any race.
Race / Ethnicity (NH = Non-Hispanic)	Pop 1980	Pop 1990	Pop 2000	Pop 2010	Pop 2020	% 1980	% 1990	% 2000	% 2010	% 2020
White alone (NH)	17,792	18,128	16,782	15,904	13,410	82.98%	75.51%	59.68%	49.19%	42.92%
Black or African American alone (NH)	2,965	3,188	2,970	3,000	2,884	13.83%	13.28%	10.56%	9.28%	9.23%
Native American or Alaska Native alone (NH)	33	96	96	125	101	0.15%	0.40%	0.34%	0.39%	0.32%
Asian alone (NH)	30	23	120	229	262	0.14%	0.10%	0.43%	0.71%	0.84%
Native Hawaiian or Pacific Islander alone (NH)	x	x	3	9	3	x	x	0.01%	0.03%	0.01%
Other race alone (NH)	14	18	13	23	73	0.07%	0.07%	0.05%	0.07%	0.23%
Mixed race or Multiracial (NH)	x	x	174	245	834	x	x	0.62%	0.76%	2.67%
Hispanic or Latino (any race)	608	2,556	7,960	12,799	13,680	2.84%	10.65%	28.31%	39.58%	43.78%
Total	21,442	24,009	28,118	32,334	31,247	100.00%	100.00%	100.00%	100.00%	100.00%

=== 2020 census ===
As of the 2020 census, the county had a population of 31,247. The median age was 36.0 years. 27.5% of residents were under the age of 18 and 15.3% of residents were 65 years of age or older. For every 100 females there were 94.6 males, and for every 100 females age 18 and over there were 92.9 males age 18 and over.

The racial makeup of the county was 51.8% White, 9.6% Black or African American, 1.2% American Indian and Alaska Native, 0.9% Asian, <0.1% Native Hawaiian and Pacific Islander, 20.5% from some other race, and 15.9% from two or more races. Hispanic or Latino residents of any race comprised 43.8% of the population.

49.3% of residents lived in urban areas, while 50.7% lived in rural areas.

There were 10,845 households in the county, of which 38.5% had children under the age of 18 living in them. Of all households, 52.6% were married-couple households, 16.0% were households with a male householder and no spouse or partner present, and 26.2% were households with a female householder and no spouse or partner present. About 22.7% of all households were made up of individuals and 10.5% had someone living alone who was 65 years of age or older.

There were 12,013 housing units, of which 9.7% were vacant. Among occupied housing units, 69.6% were owner-occupied and 30.4% were renter-occupied. The homeowner vacancy rate was 1.5% and the rental vacancy rate was 7.9%.

=== 2000 census ===
As of the 2000 census, there were 28,118 people, 9,552 households, and 7,154 families residing in the county. The population density was 68 people per square mile (26 people/km^{2}). There were 10,675 housing units at an average density of 26 units per square mile (10 units/km^{2}). The racial makeup of the county was 88.8% White, 10.10% Black or African American, 1.10% other. 40.6% of the population were Hispanic or Latino of any race.

There were 9,552 households, out of which 39.10% had children under the age of 18 living with them, 59.00% were married couples living together, 11.40% had a female householder with no husband present, and 25.10% were non-families. 22.10% of all households were made up of individuals, and 11.10% had someone living alone who was 65 years of age or older. The average household size was 2.88 and the average family size was 3.36.

In the county, the population was spread out, with 30.30% under the age of 18, 9.80% from 18 to 24, 28.00% from 25 to 44, 19.50% from 45 to 64, and 12.50% who were 65 years of age or older. The median age was 32 years. For every 100 females there were 97.80 males. For every 100 females age 18 and over, there were 94.00 males.

The median income for a household in the county was $32,452, and the median income for a family was $37,390. Males had a median income of $26,466 versus $18,238 for females. The per capita income for the county was $15,501. About 14.90% of families and 18.50% of the population were below the poverty line, including 25.10% of those under age 18 and 14.10% of those age 65 or over.

== Politics ==
United States presidential election results for Titus County, Texas
Year	Republican		Democratic		Third party(ies)	
Year	No.	%	No.	%	No.	%
1912	70	5.58%	943	75.14%	242	19.28%
1916	189	12.86%	1,164	79.18%	117	7.96%
1920	508	28.30%	1,094	60.95%	193	10.75%
1924	348	17.89%	1,589	81.70%	8	0.41%
1928	469	28.99%	1,149	71.01%	0	0.00%
1932	75	2.88%	2,523	96.96%	4	0.15%
1936	77	3.94%	1,872	95.90%	3	0.15%
1940	255	6.47%	3,686	93.53%	0	0.00%
1944	265	8.53%	2,612	84.07%	230	7.40%
1948	379	12.41%	2,339	76.56%	337	11.03%
1952	1,887	37.51%	3,142	62.45%	2	0.04%
1956	1,971	45.78%	2,301	53.45%	33	0.77%
1960	2,216	44.80%	2,701	54.61%	29	0.59%
1964	1,687	32.32%	3,528	67.60%	4	0.08%
1968	1,572	27.22%	2,317	40.12%	1,886	32.66%
1972	3,671	68.07%	1,703	31.58%	19	0.35%
1976	2,603	38.16%	4,205	61.64%	14	0.21%
1980	3,747	48.66%	3,872	50.29%	81	1.05%
1984	5,069	58.08%	3,631	41.61%	27	0.31%
1988	4,247	49.27%	4,357	50.55%	16	0.19%
1992	3,024	34.32%	3,625	41.15%	2,161	24.53%
1996	3,438	43.37%	3,725	46.99%	765	9.65%
2000	4,995	61.64%	3,008	37.12%	100	1.23%
2004	5,709	64.10%	3,173	35.62%	25	0.28%
2008	6,028	65.20%	3,145	34.02%	72	0.78%
2012	6,084	68.71%	2,648	29.91%	122	1.38%
2016	6,511	69.13%	2,597	27.57%	311	3.30%
2020	7,570	71.81%	2,856	27.09%	115	1.09%
2024	7,861	76.96%	2,275	22.27%	78	0.76%

United States Senate election results for Titus County, Texas1
Year	Republican		Democratic		Third party(ies)	
Year	No.	%	No.	%	No.	%
2024	7,545	74.50%	2,386	23.56%	197	1.95%

United States Senate election results for Titus County, Texas2
Year	Republican		Democratic		Third party(ies)	
Year	No.	%	No.	%	No.	%
2020	7,426	71.57%	2,748	26.48%	202	1.95%

Texas Gubernatorial election results for Throckmorton County
Year	Republican		Democratic		Third party(ies)	
Year	No.	%	No.	%	No.	%
2022	5,701	77.86%	1,535	20.96%	86	1.17%

Titus County was formerly represented in the Texas State Senate by Bill Ratliff, a Republican politician who served from 2001 to 2003 as Lieutenant Governor of Texas. Prior to 2000, Titus County was mostly dominated by the Democratic Party at the presidential level, only voting for Republican candidates before then in the midst of 49-state landslides in 1972 and 1984. From 2000 on, it has become solidly Republican at the presidential level along with the rest of East Texas.

Titus County is located within District 5 of the Texas House of Representatives. Titus County is located within District 1 of the Texas Senate.

== Education ==
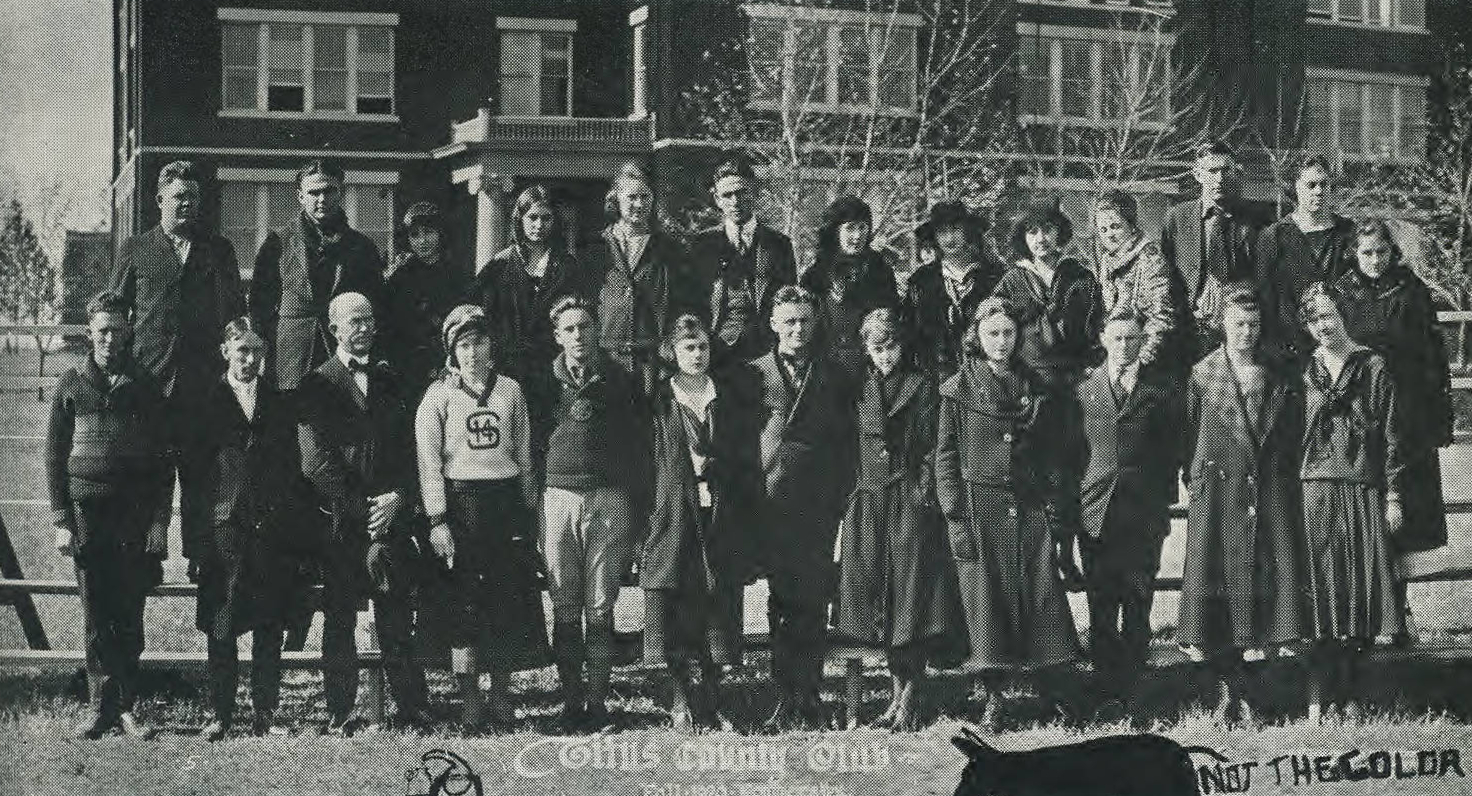
The Titus County Club at East Texas State Normal College in 1921

The following school districts serve Titus County:

- Chapel Hill ISD
- Daingerfield-Lone Star ISD (mostly in Morris County)
- Harts Bluff ISD
- Mount Pleasant ISD
- Pewitt CISD (mostly in Morris County, small portion in Cass County)
- Rivercrest ISD (partly in Red River County, small portion in Franklin County)

Until its closure, Winfield ISD served Winfield and Miller's Cove. Winfield ISD closed in 2018 and consolidated with Mount Pleasant ISD.

In addition, Northeast Texas Community College serves Titus County, as well as neighboring Morris and Camp counties.

== See also ==
- National Register of Historic Places listings in Titus County, Texas
- Recorded Texas Historic Landmarks in Titus County
