= Midway, Titus County, Texas =

Unincorporated community in Texas, US

Midway
- Unincorporated community
- Location in Texas
- Coordinates: 33°16′02″N 94°56′44″W
- Country: United States
- State: Texas
- County: Titus
- Elevation: 387 ft (118 m)

Population (2000)
  - Total: 110
- GNIS feature ID: 1374922

Midway is an unincorporated community in Titus County, Texas, United States.

== History ==
Midway is situated on Farm to Market Road 1402, and was settled by the 1930s when its school was built. It was named for being midway between Gladewater and Mount Sylvan. As of 2000, the population was 110.
