= Green Hill, Texas =

Unincorporated community in Texas, US

Green Hill
- Unincorporated community
- Location in Texas
- Coordinates: 33°14′53″N 94°59′46″W
- Country: United States
- State: Texas
- County: Titus
- Elevation: 404 ft (123 m)
- GNIS feature ID: 1378380

Green Hill, or Greenhill, is an unincorporated community in Titus County, Texas, United States.

== History ==
Green Hill is situated on Farm to Market Road 2152, and was settled in the 1850s. It was named for pastor E. H. Green. A post office operated from 1857 to 1860, and reopened from 1872 to 1907. By 1933, it had a population of 75.
