= The Gene Autry Show =

American Western television series (1950–1956)

- Title card
- Also known as: Melody Ranch
- Genre: Western
- Directed by: George Archainbaud; D. Ross Lederman
- Starring: Gene Autry; Champion; Pat Buttram; Bob Woodward
- Theme music composer: Gene Autry; Ray Whitley
- Opening theme: "Back in the Saddle Again"
- Ending theme: "Back in the Saddle Again"
- Country of origin: United States
- Original language: English
- No. of seasons: 5
- No. of episodes: 91

Production
- Running time: 25 minutes
- Production company: Flying 'A' Productions

Original release
- Network: CBS
- Release: July 23, 1950 – August 7, 1956

Related
- The Adventures of Champion; Gene Autry's Melody Ranch; Buffalo Bill, Jr.

The Gene Autry Show is an American western/cowboy television series which aired for 91 episodes on CBS from July 23, 1950 until August 7, 1956, originally sponsored by Wrigley's Doublemint chewing gum.

== Overview ==
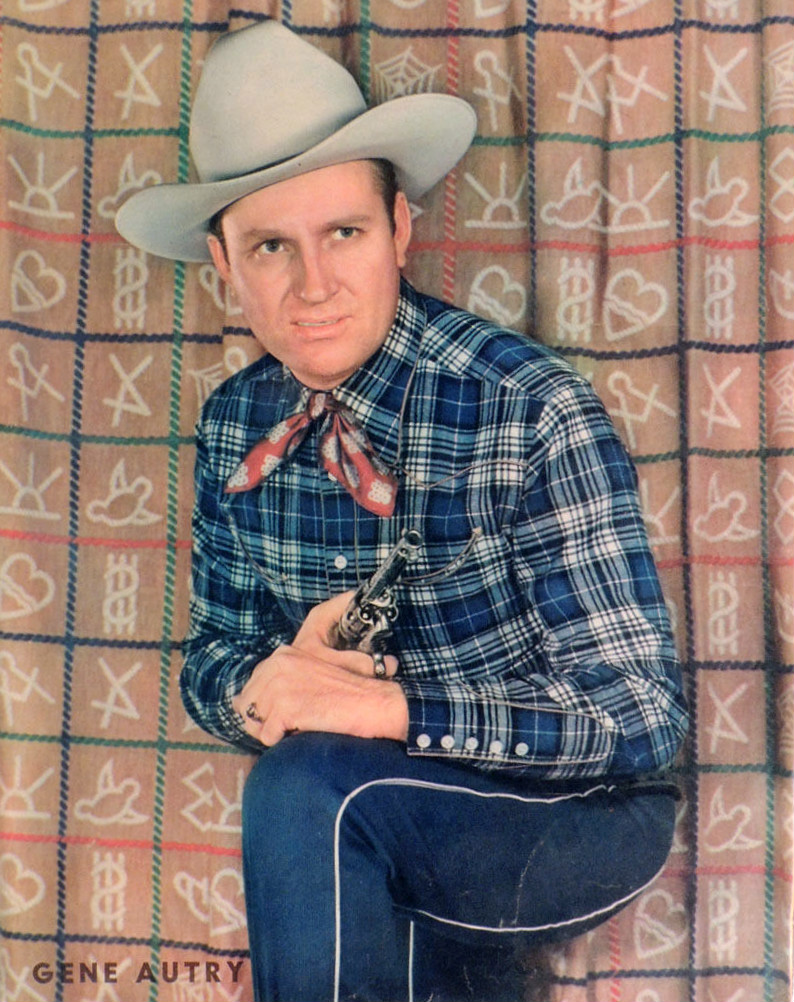
Gene Autry

Series star Gene Autry had already established his singing cowboy character on radio and films. Now he and his horse Champion were featured in a weekly television series of western adventures. Gene's role changed almost weekly from rancher, to ranch hand, to sheriff, to border agent, etc. Gene's usual comic relief and sidekick, Pat, was played by Pat Buttram.

On September 12, 1950, Pat Buttram, Gene Autry's longtime sidekick, was seriously injured while filming an upcoming episode that went into production after "The Fight at Peaceful Mesa," called "The Peacemaker." A small prop antique cannon blew up when a powder charge prematurely exploded in the cabin where the scene was being shot on location in the high desert town of Pioneertown, California, where the program filmed. Autry was blown out of the cabin, which was destroyed from the blast. He emerged stunned from the explosion but without injury. Two others, sound boom-man Johnny Loomis and Johnny Brousseau, Autry's driver for years, both suffered injuries. Loomis was cut in the abdomen and Brousseau suffered a laceration on his kneecap. Buttram, on the other hand, sustained critical injuries to his chest and stomach from the full force of the blast when jagged metal ripped the front of his chest. He was rushed to a hospital in nearby 29 Palms, with Autry at his side, and was given four blood transfusions, with more scheduled and plasma being flown in for him, due to his injuries. Dr. Ince gave the 36-year-old actor "a 50-50 chance to live." Two days later, he was removed from the critical list and doctors expected him to recover from his severe injuries.

Buttram remained hospitalized for 10 weeks before he was discharged. As a result, during the first season, other actors filled in as Gene's sidekick—Alan Hale, Jr., who played a bad guy in several shows of Seasons 1 and 2, twice as Tiny; Chill Wills twice as Sheriff Chill Wills; and Fuzzy Knight four times as Sagebrush—in the last eight programs of the season while Buttram recovered. "The Peacemaker" was retooled with new footage shot of Wills playing comic relief in place of Buttram and was broadcast as the fourth to the last program of the season. A prop antique cannon similar to the one involved in the huge explosion that occurred and injured Buttram is used new scenes with Wills near the end of the program. Unrelated to Buttram's absence during the program's last eight episodes of the first season, Dick Jones was cast in ten episodes of The Gene Autry Show and acted in two other Flying A Productions, The Range Rider and Buffalo Bill, Jr.

On Saturday, December 1, 1950, Buttram returned to work rejoining Autry as a regular on his popular CBS radio network program, Gene Autry's Melody Ranch, and was back working with Autry at the start filming of the television show's second season.

== Production ==
Autry established his own production company, Flying A Productions, and acted as executive director for the series.

All 91 episodes of "The Gene Autry Show" were filmed between 1950 and 1955 in Pioneertown, California, founded by a group of Hollywood personalities in 1946 as a permanent 1880s town for filming movies and later television shows. On September 1, 1946, Roy Rogers broken ground for the first buildings, assisted by the Sons of the Pioneers from whom the town takes its name. More than 200 movies and television programs, as well as unknown number of productions for background shots, were filmed there in its history.

The theme song Back in the Saddle Again was written by Autry and Ray Whitley and sung by Autry.

Initially the show was broadcast on Sundays from 7 to 7:30 p.m. Eastern Time. In July 1953 it was moved to Tuesdays from 8 to 8:30 p.m. E. T. In September 1954, It was moved to Saturdays from 7 to 7:30 p.m. E. T.

Episodes were syndicated by CBS Television Film Sales.

== Critical response ==
A review in TV Guide in 1954 said that episodes of the show were entertaining for young viewers but were "in too much of a rut for the majority of their elders". The review added, "This weekly triumph of good over evil makes for beneficial viewing for the kids, and maybe that's Autry's sole aim." It noted Pat Buttram's appeal to young viewers and added, "Others in the cast are uniformly competent."

== Spin-offs ==
The Gene Autry Show had two spin-offs, The Adventures of Champion and Annie Oakley.

== Home media ==
Timeless Media Group has released all five seasons on DVD in Region 1, fully restored and uncut.

On December 10, 2013, Timeless Media released The Gene Autry Show- The Complete series.

DVD name	Ep #	Release date
The Complete First Season	26	June 7, 2011
The Complete Second Season	26	November 22, 2011
The Complete Third and Fourth Seasons	26	April 10, 2012
The Complete Fifth Season	13	May 21, 2013
The Complete Series	91	December 10, 2013
