= Maple Springs, Texas =

Unincorporated community in Texas, US

Maple Springs
- Unincorporated community
- Location in Texas
- Coordinates: 33°21′20″N 95°00′20″W
- Country: United States
- State: Texas
- Texas: Titus
- Elevation: 338 ft (103 m)

Population (2000)
  - Total: 25
- USGS Feature ID: 1380137

Maple Springs is an unincorporated community in Titus County, Texas, United States.

== History ==
Maple Springs is situated on Farm to Market Road 71, and was settled in the 19th century. By the mid-1930s, it had a school, church and store. The school closed by the end of World War II. By 2000, the population was 25.
