= Harts Bluff Independent School District =

School district in Texas

Location
- Mount Pleasant, Texas United States

District information
- Type: Public School
- Grades: PK-12
- Superintendent: Dr. Bobby Rice

Students and staff
- Athletic conference: UIL Class 2A
- District mascot: Bulldogs
- Colors: Blue & Gold

Harts Bluff Independent School District (HBISD) is a public school district in Titus County, Texas (USA). Named after the Harts Bluff Farm to Market Road, the district is surrounded by the Mount Pleasant Independent School District.

It serves a section of the Mount Pleasant city limits.

Harts Bluff ISD operates three campuses:

- Harts Bluff Early College High School (Grades 9-12)
- Harts Bluff Middle School (Grades 6-8)
- Harts Bluff Elementary School (Grades PK-5)

== History ==
The Nevill's Chapel Common School District and the Oak Grove Common School District merged into Harts Bluff ISD in 1959 due to declining enrollment in Oak Grove. The campus was built equally between the two consolidated schools. The Midway School District later merged into Harts Bluff ISD.

In 2009, the school district was rated "recognized" by the Texas Education Agency.
