= The Eno Crime Club =

American radio mystery drama series (1931–1947)

The Eno Crime Club is an American radio mystery drama that was broadcast from February 9, 1931, until June 30, 1936, first on CBS and later on the Blue Network. The sponsor was Eno "Effervescent" Salts. It was also broadcast in Canada on CFRB. In 1933, the title was changed to Eno Crime Clues. The program was revived as Crime Club with no sponsor on Mutual on December 2, 1946, until it ended on October 2, 1947.

== Background ==
The Eno Crime Club was one of the first mystery programs. In the show's early years it, The Shadow, and The Adventures of Sherlock Holmes gained in popularity among radio programs, displacing dance orchestras, which had been high in ratings.

== Format ==
Radio historian John Dunning described the show as "a detective series, early and primitive." He added, "Its novel adaptations unfolded in the classic tradition, with locked-room mysteries and many clues throughout."

Spencer Dean, known as the Manhunter, solved heinous crimes, with the program using the expression "another Manhunter mystery". Dean's partner was Danny Cassidy, and Dean's love interest was Jane Elliott. As each episode opened, the announcer issued an invitation to listeners: "Match wits with the Manhunter; see how great a sleuth you really are. Listen carefully; you can solve the puzzle from the clues given in tonight's episode."

== Cast ==
Edward Reese and Clyde North portrayed Spencer Dean. Dean's partner, Danny Cassidy, was initially played by Walter Glass, who was succeeded by Jack MacBryde. Helen Choate portrayed Jane Elliott. The supporting cast included Georgia Backus, Ray Collins, Adele Ronson., Arline Blackburn, Linda Carlon-Reid, Brian Donlevy, Helene Dumas, Gloria Holden, Elaine Melchior, Ralph Sumpter, and Ruth Yorke.

== Production ==
Producers of The Eno Crime Club included Doug Coulter and William Bacher. Directors included Carlo De Angelo and Jay Hanna. Writers included Stewart Sterling and Albert G. Miller. Preparation for each 30-minute episode included three hours of rehearsal. It began with the director leading the cast in reading through the script, followed by "a run-through at the microphone". Addition of sound effects and some revisions of the script preceded the dress rehearsal, which occurred shortly before the episode was broadcast.

Joseph Dis Stephany and Eugene Eubanks headed another version of the program for CBS's Pacific Coast network in 1932. It originated from KFRC in San Francisco on Wednesdays and Thursdays from 8:30 to 9 p.m. Pacific Time.

The Eno Crime Club sounded a slowly struck gong three times between scenes, which was "a notable exception" to a pattern found in other radio mystery dramas of its era. They typically used a "musical interlude between scenes, passing in its musical atmosphere from the tempo of one scene to that of the next."

When the program was on NBC it originated from WJZ in New York City.

In 1934, William G. Smith obtained film rights to The Eno Crime Club material with plans to produce a film in Hollywood in association with Charles C. Burr.

== Episodes ==
Partial List of Episodes of The Eno Crime Club
Date	Episode	Notes
July 6, 1931	"Lawless Lady"	Story by Leslie Charteris
August 10, 1931	"Meet the Tiger"	Charteris's character The Saint "encounters a murderous opponent".
September 28, 1931	"The Patient in Room Eighteen"	Story by Mignon G. Eberhart
October 28, 1931	"Murder Gone Mad"	Story by Philip MacDonald.
December 9, 1931	"The Heaven-Sent Witness"	Story by J. S. Fletcher
May 18, 1932	"The Green Archer"	Story by Edgar Wallace.
August 9, 1932	"Angels of Doom"	Featured Charteris's character Simon Templar.
March 14, 1933	"Concerto for Two Guns"	Sigmund Spaeth, known as the "Tune Detective", helped Dean to solve a case.

== Schedule ==
The Eno Crime Club began as a daily 15-minute broadcast on CBS at 6:45 p.m. Eastern Time on February 9, 1931, but it was moved several times as the year went on. In January 1932 it became a 30-minute show on Tuesdays and Thursdays at 9:30 p.m. E. T., with each week's episodes forming a two-part story. On November 9, 1932, it was changed to one broadcast per week on Wednesdays at 9:30 p.m. E. T. The December 21, 1932, episode was the show's last on CBS.

The Blue Network began carrying the program on January 3, 1933, with episodes broadcast on Tuesdays and Wednesdays at 8 p.m. E. T. In September 1934, the Wednesday segment was dropped, with the Tuesday broadcast remaining.

The 30-minute sustaining version began on Mutual on December 2, 1946, on Mondays at 8 p.m. E. T. On January 2, 1947, it was moved to Thursdays at 10 p.m. E. T.

== Critical response ==
Vincent Terrace wrote in his book Radio Programs, 1924-1984: A Catalog of More Than 1800 Shows that crimes solved on the program "require intellect, not brawn, to solve" and that the series was "more talk than action".
