= James Titus =

American politician and farmer (1775–1843)

Member of the Mississippi Territorial Council
- In office c. 1814 – August 15, 1817

Member of the Alabama Territorial Council
- In office August 15, 1817 – 1819

Member of the Texas Senate
- In office 1842 – November 21, 1843

Personal details
- Born: December 10, 1775 Botetourt County, Colony of Virginia, Thirteen Colonies
- Died: November 21, 1843 (aged 67)
- Children: 12, including Andrew Jackson Titus

Military service
- Allegiance: United States
- Branch/service: Army
- Rank: Captain
- Unit: 7th Mississippi Infantry Regiment

James "Jack" Titus (December 10, 1775 – November 21, 1843) was an American politician and farmer.

== Biography ==
Titus was born on December 10, 1775, in Botetourt County, Colony of Virginia, to Ebenezer and Rachel Mathews Bowen Titus. In 1870, his family moved to a 320-acre property near Fort Nashborough, given to his father in compensation for fighting in the American Revolutionary War.

In 1809, Titus and his family moved to the Mississippi Territory, and was appointed captain of the 7th Mississippi Infantry Regiment. By 1814, he was serving in the Mississippi Territorial Council, and also served as its last president before statehood.

When the Alabama Territory was established in 1817, Titus' position was transferred to the Alabama Territorial Council. Though, he was the only one of three members present at the meeting in St. Stephens. Of the other two councilors, Robert Beatty had resigned, and Joseph Carson had died. Still, Titus organized the body, nominated himself as president, and voted on bills. He and John Williams Walker were responsible for Alabama's statehood.

In 1837, he and his family moved to Red River County, Texas, and was elected to the independent Texas Senate in 1842, to replace Robert Potter, and served until his death in office on November 21, 1843. He was buried in Savannah Cemetery, in Avery, Texas. His son Andrew was also a politician.
