= Cass County Boys =

American Western music group

Cass County Boys was a Western music group that was active from the mid-1940s to the early 1950s.

== History ==
The Cass County Boys was formed in 1936 in Texas when accordionist Fred Martin (1916–2010) and guitarist Jerry Scoggins (1911–2004) were staff musicians on Dallas radio station WFAA. The pair were told to fill in airtime between programs and began performing together. They shortly invited bassist Bert Dodson (1915–1994) to join them. Dodson, at the time, was playing bass for the Light Crust Doughboys. Martin was from Cass County, Texas, and an announcer began calling them the "Cass County Kids."

They regularly performed on Gene Autry's Melody Ranch radio program and appeared in many Autry movies and ten of his TV shows during that period. Scoggins later went on to sing the theme song for the Beverly Hillbillies television program.

In 1996, the group was inducted to the Western Music Association Hall of Fame.

== Selected discography ==
=== Albums ===
- Round Up In The Sky (1951)

=== Singles ===
- "Great Grandad" / "Riding Down The Canyon," 1941
- Gene Autry With The Pinafores & The Cass County Boys, "Blue Canadian Rockies" / "Onteora (Great Land In The Sky)," 1951
- Bing Crosby With Cass County Boys, "Y'all Come" / "Changing Partners," 1954
- "Round Up In The Sky" / "The Cowboy's Heaven," Unknown
- That's My Home" / "Silver Stars, Purple Sage, Eyes Of Blue," Unknown
