= Barry Minter =

American football player (born 1970)

No. 92, 50
- Position: Linebacker

Personal information
- Born: January 28, 1970 (age 56); Mount Pleasant, Texas, U.S.
- Listed height: 6 ft 2 in (1.88 m)
- Listed weight: 245 lb (111 kg)

Career information
- High school: Mount Pleasant
- College: Tulsa
- NFL draft: 1993: 6th round, 168th overall pick

Career history
- Dallas Cowboys (1993)*; Chicago Bears (1993–2000); Cleveland Browns (2001)
- * Offseason or practice squad member only

Awards and highlights
- Strength & Conditioning All-American (1992)

Career NFL statistics
- Tackles: 479
- Sacks: 11.5
- Forced fumbles: 7
- Interceptions: 5
- Stats at Pro Football Reference

Barry Antoine Minter (born January 28, 1970) is an American former professional football player who was a linebacker in the National Football League (NFL) for the Chicago Bears and Cleveland Browns. He played college football for the Tulsa Golden Hurricane.

== Early life ==
Minter attended Mount Pleasant High School, where he lettered in football, basketball and track. As a junior, he earned All-state honors in the pole vault. As a senior, he received All-district honors in football and basketball.

While playing for the Tigers football team, Barry would often play tuba, in uniform, with the Goin' Gold Tiger Marching Band at halftime during games.

He accepted a football scholarship from the University of Tulsa, where he was redshirted as a freshman. Although he was recruited as a safety, he was converted into a linebacker in 1989. He was a backup during his first two seasons and underwent arthroscopic surgery on his left knee in 1990.

As a junior, he started 10 games at outside linebacker, becoming the defense best player, while ranking second on the team in tackles with 89 (56 solo), despite missing the eighth game of the season because of a left knee ligament sprain. He also compiled 5 sacks, 2 quarterback pressures, 11 tackles for loss, 3 passes defensed, 6 forced fumbles and 3 interceptions, including one returned for a 48-yard touchdown against the University of Kansas.

As a senior, he posted 119 tackles (2 for loss), 9 quarterback pressures, one sack and one interception that he returned for a 74-yard touchdown against the University of Texas at El Paso.

He was nicknamed "Deer" because of his acceleration, finishing his college career with 261 tackles (141 solo), 11 tackles for loss, 7 sacks, 12 quarterback pressures and 6 interceptions.

== Professional career ==
=== Dallas Cowboys ===
Minter was selected by the Dallas Cowboys in the sixth round (168th overall) of the 1993 NFL draft. On August 17, after former Cowboys defensive coordinator Dave Wannstedt became the head coach for the Chicago Bears, he was traded along with linebacker Vinson Smith and a sixth-round draft pick (#198-Carl Reeves), in exchange for linebacker John Roper, tight end Kelly Blackwell and safety Markus Paul.

It has been reported that Cowboys head coach Jimmy Johnson accepted the trade to help close friend Dave Wannstedt in his new job, with all of the players received eventually being waived.

=== Chicago Bears ===
Minter was used both as an outside and middle linebacker in nickel packages until 1996, when he became a starter at middle linebacker after Bryan Cox was lost for the season with a broken thumb and finished with 106 tackles. The next year, he led the team with 125 tackles and 6 sacks.

He led the team in tackles 4 straight years (1996–1999), until injuring his back in the second game of the 2000 season and being replaced in the starting lineup by rookie Brian Urlacher, who became an All-Pro and never relinquished the position back to him.

Minter was released because of salary-cap reasons on June 1, 2001.

=== Cleveland Browns ===
On August 12, 2001, the Cleveland Browns signed him as a free agent. He appeared in one game before being waived on September 20.
