= Miller's Cove, Texas =

Town in Titus County, Texas, United States

- Town
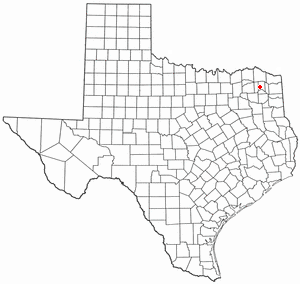
- Location of Miller's Cove, Texas

- Coordinates: 33°09′21″N 95°06′53″W
- Country: United States
- State: Texas
- County: Titus

Area
  - Total: 0.17 sq mi (0.43 km^{2})
  - Land: 0.16 sq mi (0.42 km^{2})
  - Water: 0.0039 sq mi (0.01 km^{2})
- Elevation: 446 ft (136 m)

Population (2020)
  - Total: 71
  - Density: 440/sq mi (170/km^{2})
- Time zone: UTC-6 (Central (CST))
  - Summer (DST): UTC-5 (CDT)
- Zip Code: 75457, 75493
- Area codes: 903, 430
- FIPS code: 48-48478
- GNIS feature ID: 2412997

Miller's Cove is a town in Titus County, Texas, United States. The population was 71 at the 2020 census.

== Geography ==
According to the United States Census Bureau, the town has a total area of 0.2 square mile (0.4 km^{2}), all land.

== Demographics ==
Historical population
Census	Pop.	Note	%±
1980	61		—
1990	75		23.0%
2000	120		60.0%
2010	149		24.2%
2020	71		−52.3%
U.S. Decennial Census; 2020 Census

As of the census of 2000, there were 120 people, 25 households, and 21 families residing in the town. The population density was 716.2 inhabitants per square mile (276.5/km^{2}). There were 33 housing units at an average density of 197.0 per square mile (76.1/km^{2}). The racial makeup of the town was 31.67% White, 3.33% African American, 0.83% Native American, 61.67% from other races, and 2.50% from two or more races. Hispanic or Latino of any race were 81.67% of the population.

There were 25 households, out of which 68.0% had children under the age of 18 living with them, 72.0% were married couples living together, 4.0% had a female householder with no husband present, and 16.0% were non-families. 8.0% of all households were made up of individuals, and none had someone living alone who was 65 years of age or older. The average household size was 4.80 and the average family size was 5.10.

In the town, the population was spread out, with 40.0% under the age of 18, 15.0% from 18 to 24, 30.8% from 25 to 44, 11.7% from 45 to 64, and 2.5% who were 65 years of age or older. The median age was 23 years. For every 100 females, there were 110.5 males. For every 100 females age 18 and over, there were 148.3 males.

The median income for a household in the town was $24,375, and the median income for a family was $26,250. Males had a median income of $19,773 versus $13,750 for females. The per capita income for the town was $7,892. There were 22.2% of families and 25.4% of the population living below the poverty line, including 29.4% of under eighteens and 57.1% of those over 64.

== Education ==
Since 2018, the Mount Pleasant Independent School District has operated public schools serving the town, including Mount Pleasant High School.

Prior to 2018, the Town of Miller's Cove was formerly served by the Winfield Independent School District for grades K–8, while Mount Pleasant ISD and its high school served the town at the high school level only. On July 1, 2018, Winfield ISD was consolidated into Mount Pleasant ISD, so that district now serves the community for all grades, K–12.

== See also ==
- List of municipalities in Texas
