= Andrew Jackson Titus =

American politician, soldier and planter (1814–1855)

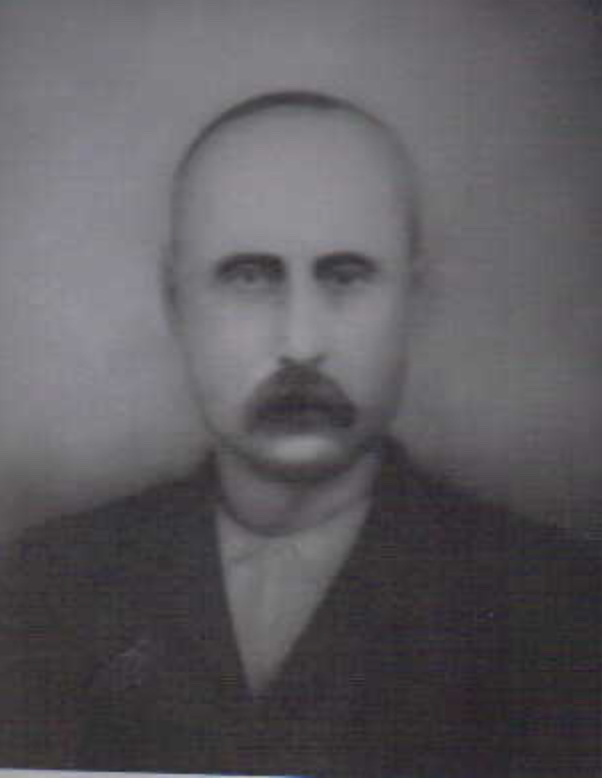

Member of the Texas House of Representatives
- In office 1851–1852

Personal details
- Born: March 12, 1814 Madison County, Mississippi Territory, US
- Died: April 9, 1855 (aged 41)
- Resting place: Savannah Cemetery, Avery, Texas, US
- Relations: James Titus (father)

Andrew Jackson Titus (March 12, 1814 – April 9, 1855) was an American politician, soldier, and planter. He was a member of the Texas House of Representatives.

== Biography ==
Titus was born on March 12, 1814, in Madison County, Mississippi Territory, to politician James Titus and Nancy Titus (née Edmondson). They moved to Tennessee in 1824, and married Jane Park Brown in Shelby County, on July 27, 1836.

In 1832, Titus and his father went to Texas to participate in the Choctaw Trail of Tears. He returned in 1839 with his family and settled near Clarksville. He was a Knights Templar of the Freemasons, and he established the A. J. Titus Lodge. In the early 1840s, he moved to Savannah, becoming its first postmaster in 1846. He served in the Mexican–American War, then represented Red River County in the Texas House of Representatives from 1851 to 1852. Politically, he championed Texas statehood, with The Monitor saying he "worked himself to death" in the effort to achieve statehood.

Titus died on April 9, 1855, aged 41, and is buried at Savannah Cemetery, in Avery, Texas. Titus County was named for him in 1846; he was an early settler of the county and constructed its first road.
