= Chaun Thompson =

American football player (born 1980)

No. 51
- Position: Linebacker

Personal information
- Born: May 22, 1980 (age 46); Mount Pleasant, Texas, U.S.
- Listed height: 6 ft 2 in (1.88 m)
- Listed weight: 250 lb (113 kg)

Career information
- High school: Mount Pleasant
- College: West Texas A&M
- NFL draft: 2003: 2nd round, 52nd overall pick

Career history
- Cleveland Browns (2003–2007); Houston Texans (2008–2009)

Career NFL statistics
- Total tackles: 231
- Sacks: 11.5
- Forced fumbles: 2
- Fumble recoveries: 2
- Pass deflections: 8
- Stats at Pro Football Reference

Chaun Thompson (born May 22, 1980) is an American former professional football player who was a linebacker for the Cleveland Browns and Houston Texans of the National Football League (NFL). He played college football for the West Texas A&M Buffaloes and was selected by the Browns in the second round of the 2003 NFL draft.

== Early life ==
Thompson attended Mount Pleasant High School in Mount Pleasant, Texas.

== College career ==
Thompson played college football at West Texas A&M University. He finished his career with the Buffaloes with 358 tackles, eight sacks, two forced fumbles, three fumble recoveries and three interceptions. In 2002, he earned Associated Press Little All-America honors and was also named the Lone Star Conference Linebacker of the Year. Thompson was inducted into the West Texas A&M Hall of Champions in 2012.

== Professional career ==
Thompson was selected by the Cleveland Browns in the second round, with the 52nd overall pick, of the 2003 NFL draft. He officially signed with the team on August 1, 2003. He played in 16 games his rookie year in 2003, recording 10 solo tackles and one assisted tackle. Thompson appeared in 16 games, starting 13, in 2004, totaling 43 solo tackles, 22 assisted tackles, 2.5 sacks, three pass breakups and one fumble recovery. He played in 16 games, starting 15, during the 2005 season, accumulating 63 solo tackles, 21 assisted tackles, five sacks, two forced fumbles, one fumble recovery and three pass breakups. He appeared in 16 games, starting two, for the Browns in 2006, recording 24 solo tackles, eight assisted tackles and two sacks. Thompson appeared in 16 games, no starts, during the 2007 season, totaling 15 solo tackles, six assisted tackles, one sack and one pass breakup. He became a free agent after the 2007 season.

Thompson signed with the Houston Texans on March 14, 2008. He played in 15 games, no starts, for the Texans in 2008, recording eight solo tackles, five assisted tackles, one sack and one pass breakup. He appeared in three games in 2009, accumulating three solo tackles and two assisted tackles, before being placed on injured reserve on September 30, 2009.

== NFL career statistics ==
Legend
**Bold**	Career high

Year	Team	Games		Tackles					Interceptions					Fumbles			
Year	Team	GP	GS	Cmb	Solo	Ast	Sck	TFL	Int	Yds	TD	Lng	PD	FF	FR	Yds	TD
2003	CLE	**16**	0	11	10	1	0.0	2	0	0	0	0	0	0	0	0	0
2004	CLE	**16**	13	65	43	**22**	2.5	2	0	0	0	0	**3**	0	**1**	0	0
2005	CLE	**16**	**15**	**84**	**63**	21	**5.0**	**10**	0	0	0	0	**3**	**2**	**1**	0	0
2006	CLE	**16**	2	32	24	8	2.0	3	0	0	0	0	0	0	0	0	0
2007	CLE	**16**	0	21	15	6	1.0	1	0	0	0	0	1	0	0	0	0
2008	HOU	15	0	13	8	5	1.0	0	0	0	0	0	1	0	0	0	0
2009	HOU	3	0	5	3	2	0.0	0	0	0	0	0	0	0	0	0	0
		98	30	231	166	65	11.5	18	0	0	0	0	8	2	2	0	0
