= Copper Canyon (film) =

1950 film

- Theatrical release poster
- Directed by: John Farrow
- Screenplay by: Jonathan Latimer
- Story by: Richard English
- Produced by: Mel Epstein
- Starring: Ray Milland; Hedy Lamarr; Macdonald Carey; Mona Freeman; Harry Carey Jr.
- Cinematography: Charles Lang
- Edited by: Eda Warren
- Music by: Daniele Amfitheatrof
- Production company: Paramount Pictures
- Distributed by: Paramount Pictures
- Release dates: October 23, 1950 (United States); November 15, 1950 (New York City)
- Running time: 84 minutes
- Country: United States
- Language: English
- Box office: $2.2 million (US rentals)

Copper Canyon is a 1950 American Technicolor Western film directed by John Farrow and starring Ray Milland and Hedy Lamarr.

== Plot ==
A group of copper miners who are Southern veterans are terrorized by local men led by deputy Lane Travis. The miners ask stage sharpshooter Johnny Carter to help them, under the impression that he is the legendary Colonel Desmond. Johnny's show comes to Coppertown and he romances lovely gambler Lisa Roselle, whom the miners believe is at the center of their troubles.

== Cast ==
- Ray Milland as Johnny Carter
- Hedy Lamarr as Lisa Roselle
- Macdonald Carey as Deputy Lane Travis
- Mona Freeman as Caroline Desmond
- Harry Carey Jr. as Lt. Ord
- Frank Faylen as Mullins
- Hope Emerson as Ma Tarbet
- Taylor Holmes as Theodosius Roberts
- Peggy Knudsen as Cora
- James Burke as Jeb Bassett
- Percy Helton as Scamper Joad
- Philip Van Zandt as Sheriff Wattling (as Philip van Zandt)
- Francis Pierlot as Moss Balfour
- Ernö Verebes as Professor
- Paul Lees as Bat Laverne
- Bobby Watson as Bixby (as Robert Watson)
- Georgia Backus as Martha Bassett
- Ian Wolfe as Mr. Henderson

== Production ==
Filming began on April 14, 1949, and concluded in early July of that year. Some scenes were shot on location near Sedona, Arizona and at Vasquez Rocks in Chatsworth, Los Angeles. Paramount postponed the release of this film to coincide with the release of the song "Copper Canyon".

== Adaptation ==
The film was adapted to comic-book form in Fawcett Comics' Copper Canyon (1950).
