= Georgia Backus =

American actress (1901–1983)

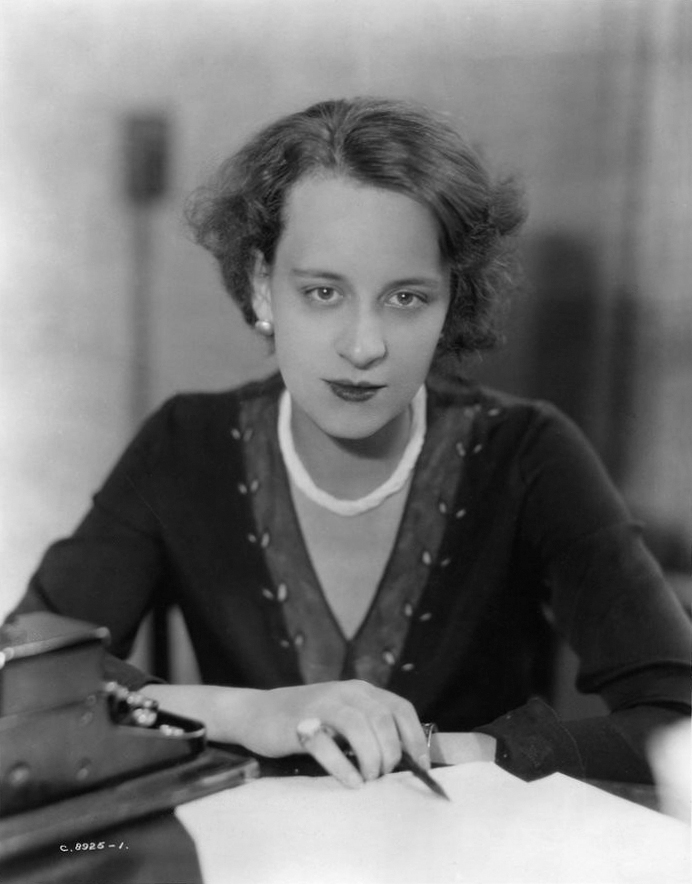
- Georgia Backus in 1930
- Born: October 13, 1901; Columbus, Ohio, U.S.
- Died: September 7, 1983 (aged 81); Sun City, California, U.S.
- Occupations: Actress, radio writer, radio director, radio producer

Georgia Belden Backus (October 13, 1901 – September 7, 1983) was an American character actress on stage, radio and screen. She was also a writer, director and producer of radio dramas. In 1930 she was named dramatic director of the Columbia Broadcasting System, to guide the development of the new art of the radio play. A member of the repertory company presenting Orson Welles's Mercury Theatre radio programs, she played supporting roles in some 30 films during the 1940s and 1950s. Her first screen credit was Citizen Kane (1941), in which she played the severe assistant in the Thatcher library. Her career was ended by the Hollywood blacklist.

== Biography ==
Georgia Belden Backus was born October 13, 1901, in Columbus, Ohio, to a theatrical family. She was named for her uncle, George Backus, a light comedic actor who performed in Florenz Ziegfeld's original stage production of Way Down East. She earned a place in a local stock company at the age of 14. She attended Smith College, and as a student at Ohio State University she toured the state as leading lady and manager of the campus dramatic society. After she received her degree she chose a career in the theatre.

While living in New York, Backus worked in stock theatre and on the Broadway stage and began to write plays and short stories. She was soon acting, writing and directing for radio. In 1930 CBS put Backus in charge of all of the network's dramatic presentations, to guide the development of the new art of the radio play. She put together an innovative team and announced three experimental dramas, beginning with Behind the Words: A Drama of Thoughts (December 26, 1930). She then directed a series titled The Columbia Experimental Dramatic Laboratory (1931–32), which would lay the foundation for the historic dramatic series, the Columbia Workshop. She was also an audition director for The March of Time and was a member of the show's prestigious ensemble cast. Backus was regularly featured on Arabesque, Brenthouse, The Eno Crime Club and The Palmolive Beauty Box Theatre

In 1935 Backus married Harmon J. Alexander, a radio writer whose credits include The Burns and Allen Show. In 1938 they moved to California, In 1939 she joined Orson Welles's Mercury Theatre repertory company on radio when production was moved to Los Angeles, performing on episodes of The Campbell Playhouse including "There's Always a Woman", "A Christmas Carol", "Come and Get It", "Theodora Goes Wild", "The Citadel", "Rabble in Arms" and "Huckleberry Finn". Her other regular roles on radio included A Date with Judy, The Story of Holly Sloan and NBC University Theatre.

Backus was also playing supporting roles in motion pictures. Her first credited role was in Citizen Kane (1941), as Miss Anderson, the severe attendant at the library of Walter Parks Thatcher. The following year she appeared in The Magnificent Ambersons and I Married a Witch. Her most widely noted role may have been as Mrs. Warren, the helpful neighbor with a garden in Cause for Alarm! (1951).

On September 19, 1951, Backus appeared under subpoena as an uncooperative witness before the House Un-American Activities Committee, which was investigating Communism in the motion picture industry. At a HUAC hearing May 7, 1953, Backus was one of more than 50 people named as Communists by director-producer-writer Robert Rossen. Her career was ended by the Hollywood blacklist.

Georgia Backus Alexander died September 7, 1983, in Sun City, California, and was buried at Forest Lawn Memorial Park.

== Filmography ==
Motion picture credits for Georgia Backus are listed by the AFI Catalog of Feature Films.

- Nobody's Children (1940) - Mrs. Wynn (uncredited)
- So Ends Our Night (1941) - Mrs. Kern (uncredited)
- Footlight Fever (1941) - Imogene - Secretary (uncredited)
- Repent at Leisure (1941) - Nurse (uncredited)
- Citizen Kane (1941) - Miss Anderson
- They Dare Not Love (1941) - German Secretary (uncredited)
- Blondie in Society (1941) - Angry Neighbor Who Had Pies (uncredited)
- You Belong to Me (1941) - Attendant (uncredited)
- Mr. District Attorney in the Carter Case (1941) - Mrs. Petherby (uncredited)
- Bedtime Story (1941) - Cashier (uncredited)
- The Lady is Willing (1942) - Nurse (uncredited)
- Shut My Big Mouth (1942) - Townswoman (uncredited)
- Take a Letter, Darling (1942) - Saleslady (uncredited)
- Not a Ladies' Man (1942) - Mrs. Roberts (uncredited)
- The Magnificent Ambersons (1942) - Matron (uncredited)
- Blondie for Victory (1942) - Mrs. Jones, Housewife of America (uncredited)
- The Talk of the Town (1942) - Townswoman (uncredited)
- I Married a Witch (1942) - Older Woman (uncredited)
- My Heart Belongs to Daddy (1942) - Miss Peel (uncredited)
- Lucky Jordan (1942) - Toyshop Clerk (uncredited)
- The Moon Is Down (1943) - Villager (uncredited)
- Standing Room Only (1944) - Guest at Ritchie Home (uncredited)
- Lady in the Dark (1944) - Miss Sullivan (uncredited)
- Suddenly, It's Spring (1947) - WAC Maj. Cheever
- Dream Girl (1948) - Edna
- Force of Evil (1948) - Sylvia Morse (uncredited)
- Too Late for Tears (1949) - Woman (uncredited)
- Song of Surrender (1949) - Mrs. Parry
- No Man of Her Own (1950) - Nurse (uncredited)
- Mother Didn't Tell Me (1950) - Mildred Tracy (uncredited)
- Copper Canyon (1950) - Martha Bassett
- Cause for Alarm! (1951) - Mrs. Warren
- Apache Drums (1951) - Mrs. Keon
- The Mark of the Renegade (1951) - Duenna Concepcion
