= Jack MacBryde =

American stage and radio actor

John N. MacBryde (1883–1966) was an American stage and radio actor. He is best known as the original voice of the Old Ranger on the radio series Death Valley Days (1930-1940s).

MacBryde's other roles on radio included:

- The Adventures of Leonidas Witherall - Sergeant McCloud
- Amanda of Honeymoon Hill - Joe Dyke
- The Eno Crime Club - Danny Cassidy

He also performed in vaudeville and acted on stage with a stock theater company headed by Pierre Watkin in Sioux City, Iowa.

MacBryde was married to Dorothy Redding.
