= Wilkinson, Texas =

Unincorporated community in Texas, US

Wilkinson
- Unincorporated community
- Location in Texas
- Coordinates: 33°20′54″N 94°57′06″W
- Country: United States
- State: Texas
- County: Titus
- Named for: Local family
- Elevation: 325 ft (99 m)

Population (2000)
  - Total: 150
- GNIS feature ID: 1376800

Wilkinson is an unincorporated community in Titus County, Texas, United States.

== Geography ==
Wilkinson is situated on the junction of Farm to Market Roads 71 and 1402.

== History ==
Wilkinson was settled in the 1870s, and was previously named New Bethlehem and Pad's Chapel, for settler Pad Harris. A post office operated from 1888 to 1914, and was named Wilkinson, after a local family. A newspaper Free Press was established in Wilkinson and was edited by district clerk J. Ab Ward. In 1896, the town's population was an estimated 600, but is inaccurate.

During the Interwar period, Wilkinson was nicknamed Sugar Hill. It originated from either settler Sug Harris, the town's abundance of sugar, or the women in the town being "sweet as sugar". Oil was discovered in Wilkinson in the 1930s. As of 2000, the town had a population of 150.
