= Jerry Scoggins =

American singer-songwriter

- Born: September 30, 1911; Mount Pleasant, Texas, United States
- Died: December 7, 2004 (aged 93) Westlake Village, California, United States
- Genres: Country
- Occupations: Singer; instrument; band leader
- Instruments: Guitar
- Formerly of: Cass County Boys

Jerry Scoggins (September 30, 1911 – December 7, 2004) was an American country/western singer, guitarist, and band leader. He performed on radio, in movies, and on television from the 1930s thru the 1980s. He was noted for his work with Gene Autry and Bing Crosby and especially for singing "The Ballad of Jed Clampett", the theme song to the 1960s sitcom The Beverly Hillbillies.

== Biography ==
Scoggins was born in Mount Pleasant, Texas in 1911. He sang and played guitar on Dallas radio stations in the early 1930s and in 1936 formed his own group, the Cass County Kids, with John Dodson and Fred Martin. Ten years later in 1946, country musician and cowboy Gene Autry changed their name to the Cass County Boys when he hired them to work on his Melody Ranch radio program. They appeared in 17 of his films and worked with him on radio and TV for 12 years while also appearing with Bing Crosby on early 1950s TV. In 1996 the Boys were inducted into Western Music Hall of Fame. They also received a Golden Boot Award from the Motion Picture and Television Fund.

In 1962, Scoggins was working as a stockbroker and singing on weekends when he was asked to sing the theme song for a new sitcom, called The Beverly Hillbillies. Lester Flatt and Earl Scruggs played guitar and banjo while he sang the lyrics. "The Ballad of Jed Clampett" was a smash hit on the charts, with Flatt singing on the single.

In 1993, a retired Scoggins learned that 20th Century Fox was making a film version of the series. He called their offices only to be told that they had had no idea he was still alive. The studio preferred Johnny Cash or Willie Nelson to sing the theme song, but the director, Penelope Spheeris, insisted on Scoggins getting the job, which he did. He figured he had probably sung the ballad over 1,000 times since the original recording.

Scoggins appeared on-camera, singing the ballad, in the 1993 TV special, The Legend of The Beverly Hillbillies.

== Death ==
Scoggins died in 2004, from natural causes, in his Westlake Village, California home. He was 93. Scoggins was interred at Pierce Brothers Valley Oaks Memorial Park, in Westlake Village, California.
