= Hopalong Cassidy (radio program) =

American radio program

- Genre: Western
- Running time: 30 minutes
- Country of origin: United States
- Language: English
- Syndicates: Commodore Productions; Mutual; CBS
- TV adaptations: Hopalong Cassidy
- Starring: William Boyd; Andy Clyde
- Written by: Howard Swart; Dean Owen; Harold Swanton
- Directed by: Ted Bliss
- Produced by: Walter and Shirley White; Charles Henry
- Original release: 1948 – December 27, 1952

Hopalong Cassidy is a radio western in the United States, featuring the character Hopalong Cassidy created by writer Clarence E. Mulford. It was syndicated via electrical transcription, beginning in 1948 and continuing into 1950. Its network broadcasts began on Mutual January 1, 1950, and ended on CBS December 27, 1952.

== Background ==
CBS produced an audition episode of a Hopalong Cassidy program that was broadcast in the summer of 1941 as part of Forecast, a series of pilots for potential programs. After that, little, if anything, was heard about a Hopalong Cassidy radio production until five years later. An item in Radio Life in 1946 commented, "Radio's gone western with a vengeance, as if you didn't know!" and reported that a radio version of the Cassidy movies would be heard "in the near future." That "near future" turned out to be two years.

== Format ==
The program has been classified as both a "juvenile adventure program" and a "western adventure drama." As was true of the movies and television programs featuring Hopalong Cassidy, "the character was much more civilized than the rough-cut character portrayed in the novels" by Clarence E. Mulford. In contrast, the revised Cassidy was described by radio historian John Dunning as "a knight of the range, a man of morals." A newspaper story about the program's debut on Mutual commented, "The radio broadcasts will be specially scripted to highlight the personality, mannerisms and unusual adventures of the steely-eyed, justice-dealing, gun-toting cowboy hero."

== Characters and cast ==
William Boyd played Hopalong Cassidy, as he had in the movies featuring that character. Dunning wrote: "Boyd had one of radio's perfect voices. His voice could do anything – comfort a bereaved widow one moment, scare the boots off her husband's killer the next. It was strong, virile, and straight to the point. And that Hoppy belly-laugh became famous. It was one of his trademarks."

Andy Clyde, "the resident old coot sidekick from the later movies" had his same role in the radio program. Each episode's opening referred to Clyde's character, California Carlson, as "'the same California you've laughed at a million times.'"

== Synergy of media ==
After a slow start (when producers Walter and Shirley White "were paying production costs for new episodes as money came in from initial clients"), the popularity of Hopalong Cassidy on radio began to increase. In 1948, a Hopalong Cassidy television series began, first shown on KTLA in Los Angeles, California. That series included both edited versions of Cassidy's movies and new episodes made for TV. "One medium fed on the other," Dunning wrote, and "for two years [Boyd] was as big a media hero as the nation had seen."

Both the radio and the television versions of Hopalong Cassidy benefited from the existing popularity the Cassidy character had developed through movies. The producers made good use of that popularity in promoting the syndicated program to stations and advertisers. An ad in the 1949 issue of Broadcasting Yearbook proclaimed:

"THIRTEEN YEARS OF MOTION PICTURE POPULARITY BEHIND IT! (NO OTHER RADIO SERIES CAN MAKE THIS CLAIM!) An action-packed film trailer will be shown in over 10,000 theatres announcing the radio series! "HOPALONG CASSIDY" comes to radio with a fabulous following ... a ready made audience for sponsors!

== See also ==
- Death Valley Days
- Gene Autry's Melody Ranch
- The Roy Rogers Show
