= Gene Autry's Melody Ranch =

Western variety radio show in the United States

- Gene Autry publicity photo
- Other names: Doublemint's Melody Ranch
- Genre: Country music
- Running time: 30 minutes
- Country of origin: United States
- Language: English
- Home station: CBS KNX Playhouse, Hollywood, CA
- Starring: Gene Autry
- Announcer: Wendell Niles; Tom Hanlon; Lou Crosby; Charles Lyon
- Original release: January 7, 1940 – May 16, 1956
- Audio format: Mono
- Opening theme: "Back in the Saddle Again"
- Sponsored by: Doublemint

Gene Autry's Melody Ranch is a Western variety radio show in the United States. A 15-minute pilot show aired on December 31, 1939. The program ran from January 7, 1940 to August 1, 1943, and from September 23, 1945 to May 16, 1956. The show's entire run was broadcast over the CBS radio network, sponsored by Doublemint gum. The approximately two-year interruption resulted from Autry's enlistment in the United States Army to serve in World War II. Initially titled Doublemint's Melody Ranch, the show's name was changed to Gene Autry's Melody Ranch in early 1941. Episodes were 30 minutes long except for a 15-minute version that ran from September 23, 1945 to June 16, 1946. The theme song was "Back in the Saddle Again".

In its early years the show was broadcast live before a studio audience from the CBS Columbia Square KNX Playhouse at Sunset and Gower in Hollywood and preserved on acetate disc. Later on it was taped prior to airtime, usually at KNX. When on tour, the show would originate through the facilities of local CBS affiliate stations. Sometimes it took place at a special event. In 1951 the program had an 8:00 p.m., Saturday night, 30 minute time slot. The show for August 11, 1951 originated from the Illinois State Fairgrounds at Springfield, Illinois. The guests were Governor of Illinois Adlai E. Stevenson II and 12-year-old 4-H Club member Shelby Jean Thomas of Kilbourne, Illinois.

== Background ==
The William Wrigley Jr. Company selected Autry's program for sponsorship after hearing an audition episode. The show replaced Gateway to Hollywood, which the company had sponsored. An item in the January 1, 1940, issue of Broadcasting magazine reported that the program "will feature Gene Autry, singing cowboy, and dramatics" and that it would be carried on 67 CBS stations.

== Format ==
Centering on the talent and popularity of the star, singing cowboy Gene Autry, each episode of the program "consisted of a Western adventure interspersed with interludes of music." John Dunning, in his reference book, Tune in Yesterday, summarized the format as follows:

His own show changed little over the years. It featured a slightly sophisticated version of his 1929 act—Autry stories and songs, projected in a campfire atmosphere. Autry told his listeners that his broadcasts were coming directly from his home, Melody Ranch, in the San Fernando Mountains. He surrounded himself with a cast of regular foot-stompers ... The music was decidedly Western, with heavy accordion emphasis. There was usually one "Cowboy Classic" by Autry. [Pat] Buttram's acts were inserted for comic relief and consisted mainly of back-and-forth banter with Autry ... The highlight of each show, at least for the juvenile listeners, came when Autry told a 10- to 15-minute story, fully dramatized, of some recent adventure.

An article in Movie-Radio Guide in 1941 gave a couple of examples of plots used on the show: "Sometimes they're initiating an eastern tenderfoot visiting the ranch; sometimes they're saving the school teacher and her children trapped in a ring of fire."

Two episodes of the program featured notable variations from the standard format. One involved the changing of the name of Berwyn, Oklahoma, to Gene Autry, Oklahoma. From there, on November 16, 1941, the Melody Ranch program aired as a part of the name-changing ceremony. An Oklahoma Gazette article from September 3, 2009, included the following information:

He is also the namesake of an Oklahoma town, population 99.

Born in Texas, Autry was raised north of the Red River near Ravia after his parents moved there in the 1920s. Autry's Flying A Ranch, where the famous cowboy kept his rodeo stock, was located adjacent to the town that was, at the time, known as Berwyn. In honor of the presence of cowboy royalty in its midst, the town was renamed Gene Autry in 1941.

To mark the occasion, Autry broadcast his Gene Autry's Melody Ranch radio show from the Flying A, and more than 35,000 people turned out for the festivities, which included Autry parading through the town atop a flatbed car. At the time, the population of the newly re-christened town was around 300 people, according to Mary Schutz, director of programs and publicity at the Gene Autry Oklahoma Museum there.

Three weeks later, on Sunday, December 7, 1941, from the CBS KNX Playhouse, Studio C, in Hollywood, the live broadcast of the Melody Ranch program was delayed for a 15-minute news update regarding the Japanese attack on Pearl Harbor which had commenced some six hours earlier in the morning at 7:48 a.m. Hawaiian Time. Probably not yet aware of the attack, everyone in the KNX studio was stunned. Somehow they managed to get through a shortened program after the cue was finally given to begin.

On December 21, 1941, a 45-minute Melody Ranch Christmas Special aired from the KNX Playhouse in Hollywood. The 45 minute format continued on into 1942 with a second drama added as the theme of the program quickly changed to support the war effort. The second drama was often about a historic U.S. Cavalry battle with the Indians or a similar historic event. The songs were a mix of Western and patriotic selections.

The other notable episode came July 26, 1942, when Autry took his oath of office to join the United States Army Air Forces during that day's broadcast of the Melody Ranch program which originated from the CBS WBBM Playhouse, Studio 10, in Chicago. There, at 4:02 minutes into the program, we hear Virginia Vass sing "Idaho". She was a regular vocalist on the Melody Ranch show at the time. In mid 2009, at the age of 93, Virginia recalled Gene Autry and his Melody Ranch show in an Out of the Past interview by Chuck Langdon and Lee Shephard.

The most significant change in the program was to come after Gene Autry's induction into the U.S. Army Air Forces. While the format remained the same it was the theme that was modified. The name of the show was changed to Sergeant Gene Autry retaining its same CBS timeslot. The show began to include Army Air Forces songs and the drama became Army Air Forces oriented as well. At first still originating at or through KNX in Los Angeles and WBBM in Chicago, soon the show began originating from various Army Air Forces bases through local CBS stations, often from one of Luke Field's facilities through CBS affiliate KOY in Phoenix as well as from various air fields in Texas and elsewhere. Personnel changed in the process using those then in the U.S. Army Air Forces. The members of the trio were now Eddie Dean, Jimmie Dean (brother of Eddie), and Dick Reinhart. Carl Cotner was also in the service and was still involved with the program. The program now included much talk about and interviews of Army Air Forces personnel and songs such as "Private Buckaroo", "Army Air Corps Song", and "I'll Trade My Horse and Saddle for a Pair of Wings". There was also still a cowboy song or two included as well as a Western Classic.

The program was introduced by Wrigley and at the end of the show handed back to Wrigley at KNX in Hollywood so they could do their gum commercials even though Doublemint gum was no longer available due to the government's rationing of sugar. The announcer would advise the audience that the program was not an endorsement of the Wrigley product by the U.S. Army Air Forces. In early August 1943, Gene Autry was transferred to the Air Transport Command. The last Sergeant Gene Autry Show aired August 1, 1943 from the Luke Field Recreation Hall near Phoenix. The program was replaced with a new Wrigley series, America in the Air, which premiered on August 8, 1943, featuring dramas portraying war-front events, and ran until the Autry series returned.

With World War II having ended, Gene Autry's Melody Ranch returned to the airwaves on September 23, 1945 as a 15-minute program, going to a 30-minute format on July 16, 1946. The Pinafores, joined the show in September 1945 followed by the Cass County Boys in November 1945. In 1953, the King Sisters, as the Gene Autry Blue Jeans, replaced the Pinafores. Eventually Wrigley cut back on the budget and the orchestra's violin section was replaced by an organ. Alvino Rey came on board about the same time. In late 1955 or early 1956 the Melody Ranch program was reduced to 25 minutes to make room for a five-minute news update. Carl Cotner, the Cass County Boys, Johnny Bond, Pat Buttram, and announcer Charlie Lyon continued to the end. The contract with Wrigley called for a new Melody Ranch episode each week. Occasionally it was necessary to substitute a previously aired transcribed episode and Wrigley made it known that this was unacceptable. When this happened again on May 6, 1956 Wrigley cancelled. A tribute program followed a week later on May 13, 1956 hosted by Pat Buttram and Charles Lyon.

== Reissues ==
In 1973, American Radio Programs reissued episodes of the program for use by radio stations. An item in Broadcasting reported, "Original transcriptions of the weekly half-hour show [were] reproduced on tape for syndication ..."

Beginning in the late 1990s, in cooperation with the Autry Qualified Trust and The Autry Foundation, Gene Autry's movies were fully restored and issued on DVDs by Image Entertainment as the Gene Autry Collection series. Offered through the Autry Museum of the American West, the DVD for each film includes excerpts from or else a complete Melody Ranch radio show. Typically the audio and video quality is excellent.

For example, the Gaucho Serenade DVD includes excerpts from the Melody Ranch show of June 2, 1940, location not stated, - Opening Theme: "Back in the Saddle Again", "Keep Rollin' Lazy Longhorns" (from Gaucho Serenade) by Autry, "Old Buckaroo, Goodbye" by Autry, Drama: "Ruckus in Moosehead", "I Only Want a Buddy, Not a Sweetheart" by Autry, Closing Theme: "Back in the Saddle Again". Also included are Doublemint gum pitches. Unfortunately three selections are left out - "Apple Blossoms and Chapel Bells" by Miss Nancy, "I Like Mountain Music" by Autry and Shorty Long, and "The Little Old Church in the Valley" by Autry and the Texas Rangers. Carefully edited, one does not suspect that the issue on DVD is not the complete show without comparing to the contents of the original show which information is not readily available.

In another example, the Ridin' on a Rainbow DVD, the complete show of March 23, 1941 from the CBS KNX Playhouse in Hollywood is included - Opening Theme: "Sing Me a Song of the Saddle", "Wonder Valley" by Autry, "Me and My Burro" by Jimmy Wakely Trio, "My Little Cow Pony" by Mary Lee, Drama: "Crazy Sanders at Demon Lake", "You Tell Me Your Dream, I'll Tell You Mine" by Autry, Closing Theme: "Sing Me a Song of the Saddle", plus the Doublemint gum pitches.

== Personnel ==
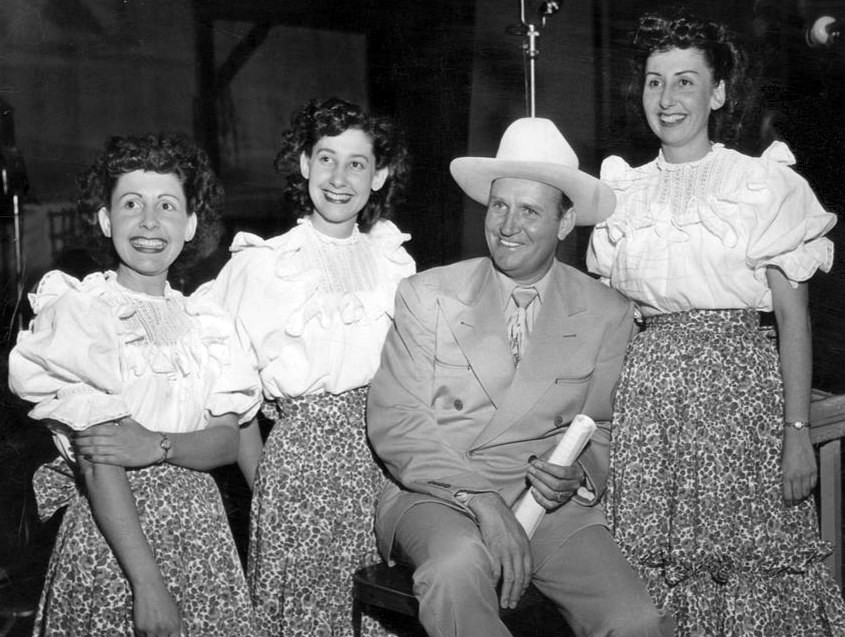
Gene Autry and the Pinafores, 1948

In addition to Autry, over the years people involved in the program included:

=== Cast ===
- Dorothy Ellers as Miss Nancy Mason - vocals (January 1940 - September 1940)
- Horace Murphy as Shorty Long - comedy (February 1940 - February 1943)
- Frank Nelson as Reno (May 1940 - October 1940)
- Mary Lee Wooters - vocals (September 1940 - March 1941)
- Johnny Bond - comedy, vocals (November 1940 - May 1956)
- Ella Sutton - vocals (May 1941 - December 1941)
- Virginia Vass - vocals (January 1942 - August 1942)
- Eddie Dean - vocals (April 1942 - April 1943)
- Nora Lou - vocals (August 1942)
- Colleen Summers (Mary Ford) - violin, vocals (July 1946 - November 1946)
- Smiley Burnette - comedy, vocals (July 1946 - March 1947)
- Pat Buttram - comedy (May 1948 - May 1956)
- Sara Berner as Chiquita - comedy (April 1949 - October 1949)
- Ruby Dandridge as Raindrop - comedy (August 1949 - April 1951)
- Norma Zimmer - vocal accompaniment
- Jim Boles - character actor
- Jerry Hausner - character actor
- Harry Lang - character actor
- Jack Mather - character actor
- Tyler McVey - character actor

=== Vocal groups ===
- Jimmy Wakely and the Rough Riders (Jimmy Wakely, Johnny Bond, and Dick Reinhart) (November 1940)
- The Jimmy Wakely Trio (Jimmy Wakely, Johnny Bond, and Dick Reinhart) (December 1940 - July 1941)
- The Pinafores (Eunice, Beulah, and Ione Kettle) (September 1945 - January 1953)
- The Cass County Boys (Jerry Scoggins, Bert Dodson, and Fred Martin) (November 1945 - May 1956)
- The King Sisters (Alyce, Marilyn, and Yvonne) as the Gene Autry Blue Jeans (1953 - 1956)

=== Musicians ===
- Frankie Marvin - steel guitar (December 1939 - 1955)
- Carl Cotner - violin
- Johnny Bond - acoustic guitar
- Merle Travis - guitar
- Jerry Scoggins - guitar
- Bert Dodson - bass
- Fred Martin - accordion
- Colleen Summers (Mary Ford) - violin, vocals (July 1946 - November 1946)
- Alvino Rey - electric guitar (1953 - 1956)

=== Orchestra ===
- Lou Bring - music director, orchestra leader (1940 - 1945)
- Paul Sells' Orchestra (1942 - 1946)
- Johnny Marvin - orchestra leader (d. 20 Dec 1944)
- Carl Cotner - music director, arranger, orchestra leader
- Carl Cotner's Orchestra (1947 - )
- Carl Cotner's Melody Ranch Hard-Way-Six with Alvino Rey

=== Announcers ===
- Ken Ellington (pilot show)
- Wendell Niles (January 1940 - )
- Tom Hanlon
- Lou Crosby(September 1945 - June 1948)
- John Jacobs (June 1948 - August 1948)
- Perry Ward (September 1948 - October 1948)
- Charles Lyon (February 1949 - May 1956)

=== Producers ===
- Tony Stanford ( - May 1941)
- Bradford Browne (May 1941 - )
- Bill Burch (July 1946 - )

== Melody Ranch television show ==
In September 1964, the television version of Gene Autry's Melody Ranch debuted on his Los Angeles television station, KTLA channel 5. The weekly 60-minute Melody Ranch program aired in color Saturday evenings and continued through the years into 1973 with summer reruns beginning in 1971. The cast included Carl Cotner, Johnny Bond, and Billy Mize sharing host duties, plus vocalists Cathie Taylor and Joan De Ville, the Jack Halloran Singers, and Carl Cotner's band. Gene Autry, by then retired as an entertainer, made only a few rare appearances on the program which featured many well known established and upcoming country music guest artists along with occasional Western guests including Rex Allen, Tex Ritter, Jimmy Wakely, and the Sons of the Pioneers.

== Related pages ==
- Gene Autry / Melody Ranch - Gene Autry's Melody Ranch in Placerita Canyon near Newhall, California
- Melody Ranch - 1940 Republic Pictures film with Gene Autry, Jimmy Durante, Ann Miller, Gabby Hayes, and Mary Lee
- The Gene Autry Show - CBS television series (1950-1956)

== See also ==
- Death Valley Days
- Hopalong Cassidy
- The Roy Rogers Show
