= Death Valley Days (radio program) =

US radio Western

- Other names: Death Valley Sheriff; The Sheriff
- Genre: Western
- Running time: 30 minutes
- Country of origin: United States
- Language: English
- TV adaptations: Death Valley Days
- Hosted by: Leo Cleary; Jack MacBryde; Tim Daniel Frawley; George Rand; Harry Humphrey; Harvey Hays; John White
- Announcer: George Hicks; Dresser Dahlstead; John Reed King
- Created by: Ruth Cornwall Woodman
- Written by: Ruth Cornwall Woodman; Ruth Adams Knight
- Directed by: Walter Scanlan; Florence Ortman
- Original release: September 30, 1930 – September 14, 1951
- Sponsored by: Pacific Borax Company; Procter & Gamble; American Chicle

Death Valley Days is a radio Western in the United States. It was broadcast on the Blue Network/ABC, CBS, and NBC from September 30, 1930, to September 14, 1951. It "was one of radio's earliest and longest lasting programs." Beginning August 10, 1944, the program was called Death Valley Sheriff, and on June 29, 1945, it became simply The Sheriff.

== Format ==
=== Death Valley Days ===
Radio's first Western, Death Valley Days "dramatized pioneer life in the United States." The program has been described as "the most successful of [the] early western dramas." It was said to present true stories of the old West, with "CBS [asserting] that because of its reputation for accuracy in broadcasting the dramatic history of the development of the West, Death Valley Days was recommended by teachers to their students wherever it was heard to supplement their studies at school." Radio historian John Dunning commented, "By 1940, the show's reputation for historical accuracy was well-established." That accuracy was attested to by the recognition received by the program. "Death Valley Days won awards from the Governors of California, Nevada, and Utah and historical societies including the Native Daughters of the Golden West, and from the University of Washington."

Each episode began with a bugle call, followed by an announcer's introduction of The Old Ranger ("a composite character who had known the bushwhackers, desperados, and lawmen of the old days by first name"). For nearly six years, the program also included Western songs by John White, known as "The Lonesome Cowboy."

=== Death Valley Sheriff and The Sheriff ===
Beginning in 1944, a modernized version of Death Valley Days was presented with the title Death Valley Sheriff, which the following year was changed to simply The Sheriff. Instead of "The Old Ranger," the host/narrator was Sheriff Mark Chase of Canyon County, California.

== Personnel ==
=== Host/narrator ===
As an anthology series, Death Valley Days had no continuing cast of characters other than The Old Ranger, who introduced and narrated each episode. Originally portrayed by former vaudevillian Leo Cleary, the Ranger was later played by Jack MacBryde, Tim Daniel Frawley, George Rand, and Harry Humphreys. In the later versions (Death Valley Sheriff and The Sheriff), Sheriff Mark Chase was portrayed by Robert Haag, Donald Briggs, and Bob Warren. Announcers were George Hicks, Dresser Dahlstead, and John Reed King.

=== Creator/writer ===
Ruth Cornwall Woodman was a writer for McCann Erickson when that advertising agency's executives decided to launch Death Valley Days. As one of the few agency employees who wrote for radio, Woodman was assigned to write the scripts for Death Valley Days. "The program's sponsor, Pacific Coast Borax Company, stipulated that the writer should have a first-hand knowledge of the Death Valley region," so for 14 years Woodman went to Death Valley each summer to gather information that she could use in her scripts. Each summer's trip provided enough material for Woodman to write scripts for the next season of the program. She continued to write for the program after its radio broadcasts ended and the televised version began. A 1962 newspaper article noted, "Mrs. Woodman has written every one of the Death Valley Days scripts for 31 years -- which amounts to more than 1,000 stories."

== Sponsors ==
For most of its time on the air, Death Valley Days was sponsored by the Pacific Borax Company, manufacturer of 20 Mule Team Borax. Dunning wrote: "The show immediately established its ties to the sponsor." The third episode dealt with finding borax at Furnace Creek, and several episodes dealt with 20-mule teams.

Procter & Gamble and American Chicle Company became sponsors of The Sheriff in 1951.

== See also ==
- Gene Autry's Melody Ranch
- Hopalong Cassidy, radio program
- The Roy Rogers Show, radio program
- Death Valley Days, TV series
