= The Roy Rogers Show (radio program) =

Western radio program in the United States

- Genre: Western
- Running time: 30 minutes
- Country of origin: United States
- Language(s): English
- Syndicates: Mutual; NBC
- TV adaptations: The Roy Rogers Show
- Starring: Roy Rogers
- Announcer: Verne Smith; Lou Crosby; Art Balinger
- Written by: Ray Wilson
- Directed by: Fran Van Hartesfeldt; Ralph Rose
- Produced by: Art Rush; Tom Hargis
- Narrated by: Frank Hemingway
- Original release: November 21, 1944 – 1955
- Opening theme: "It's Roundup Time on the Double R Bar"
- Ending theme: "Happy Trails"
- Sponsored by: Goodyear; Miles Laboratories; Quaker Oats; General Foods; Dodge

The Roy Rogers Show was a 30-minute Western radio program in the United States. It began in 1944, ended in 1955, and was carried on more than 500 stations. Because of demands on Rogers' time for personal appearances and making films, the show was one of the first radio series to be transcribed.

== Format ==
Like the television program of the same name, the show centered on Roy Rogers, one of the most popular singing-cowboy movie stars. Initially, the radio show differed in format from The Roy Rogers Show on TV, with the radio version being more oriented toward music. Toward its end, however, it moved more toward the adventure featured in the TV show. Radio historian John Dunning wrote:

"[T]he early shows followed the pattern set by [Gene] Autry's Melody Ranch ... Rogers' show featured Roy and the Sons of the Pioneers in such fine Western favorites as "Tumbling Tumbleweeds," "Cool Water," and "Don't Fence Me In." Much of the show was campfire banter and song, with Roy and songstress Pat Friday doing vocal solos, Perry Botkin leading the Goodyear orchestra and Verne Smith announcing. Dramatic skits were offered, but leaned to lighter material than what the show used in late years. Ultimately, it became primarily a Western thriller show.

The show's music, like that featured in Rogers' movies, had a lasting effect on the music business. A 1986 article in Billboard magazine endorsed membership for Rogers in the Country Music Hall of Fame. It said, in part, "Two generations of Americans grew up with Rogers on the silver screen, TV, and radio -- and the impact he had on the present success of country music would be hard to estimate and easy to underestimate." Although Rogers was already in the Hall of Fame as a member of the Sons of the Pioneers when that article was written, he was inducted as an individual in 1988.

The music's appeal endured enough that, in 1999, the Rhino Entertainment company brought out a four-CD box set of Rogers' music. The 94-song set was described in a newspaper article as "heavy on transcriptions of old radio show broadcasts, auditions and live performances that have never before been released."

The triumph of good over evil was a continuing thread throughout the program's existence. A 1954 newspaper article noted that Rogers' radio and TV shows featured "entertainment ... in which justice triumphs." It added: "A steady parade of badmen forever appear to plague the law-abiding, justice-loving Roy Rogers and to present to Roy and his friends a constant challenge. Embezzlers, swindlers, poachers, bank robbers, horse-thieves and diamond smugglers ... each to be vanquished in turn by the hard-riding cowboy."

== Cast ==
The main actors in the program were familiar to fans of Rogers' movies. He was the star, with wife Dale Evans and sidekick Gabby Hayes. Initially, the Sons of the Pioneers were the featured musical group; in 1948, they were replaced by Foy Willing and the Riders of the Purple Sage. In the show's later years, Pat Brady replaced Hayes. Hayes was Rogers' "grizzled sidekick from the movies," whereas Brady "was a different sort of sidekick, younger and more useful, although still comical."

Other people heard in the program over the years included Forrest Lewis, The Whippoorwills, and Joseph Kearns. Rogers' horse, Trigger, and dog, Bullet, were also featured regularly in the program.

== See also ==
- Death Valley Days
- Gene Autry's Melody Ranch
- Hopalong Cassidy
