= Chapel Hill Independent School District (Titus County, Texas) =

School district in Texas

Coordinates: 33.1577°N 94.9850°W

Location
- Southeastern Titus County Texas; United States

District information
- Type: Public
- Superintendent: Daniel Pritchett

Other information
- Website: chisddevils.com

Chapel Hill Independent School District is a public school district located in Southeastern Titus County, Texas (USA).

The district has three schools on the same campus – Chapel Hill High (grades 9-12), Chapel Hill Junior High (grades 6-8), and Chapel Hill Elementary (grades K-5). The campus is located approximately 1/4 mile north of Northeast Texas Community College.

The principal for the elementary school is Misty Lake. The principal for the junior high school is Chris McClure. The principal for the high school is Matt Dunn.

In 2009, the school district was rated "academically acceptable" by the Texas Education Agency.
