= Mount Pleasant, Texas =

- City
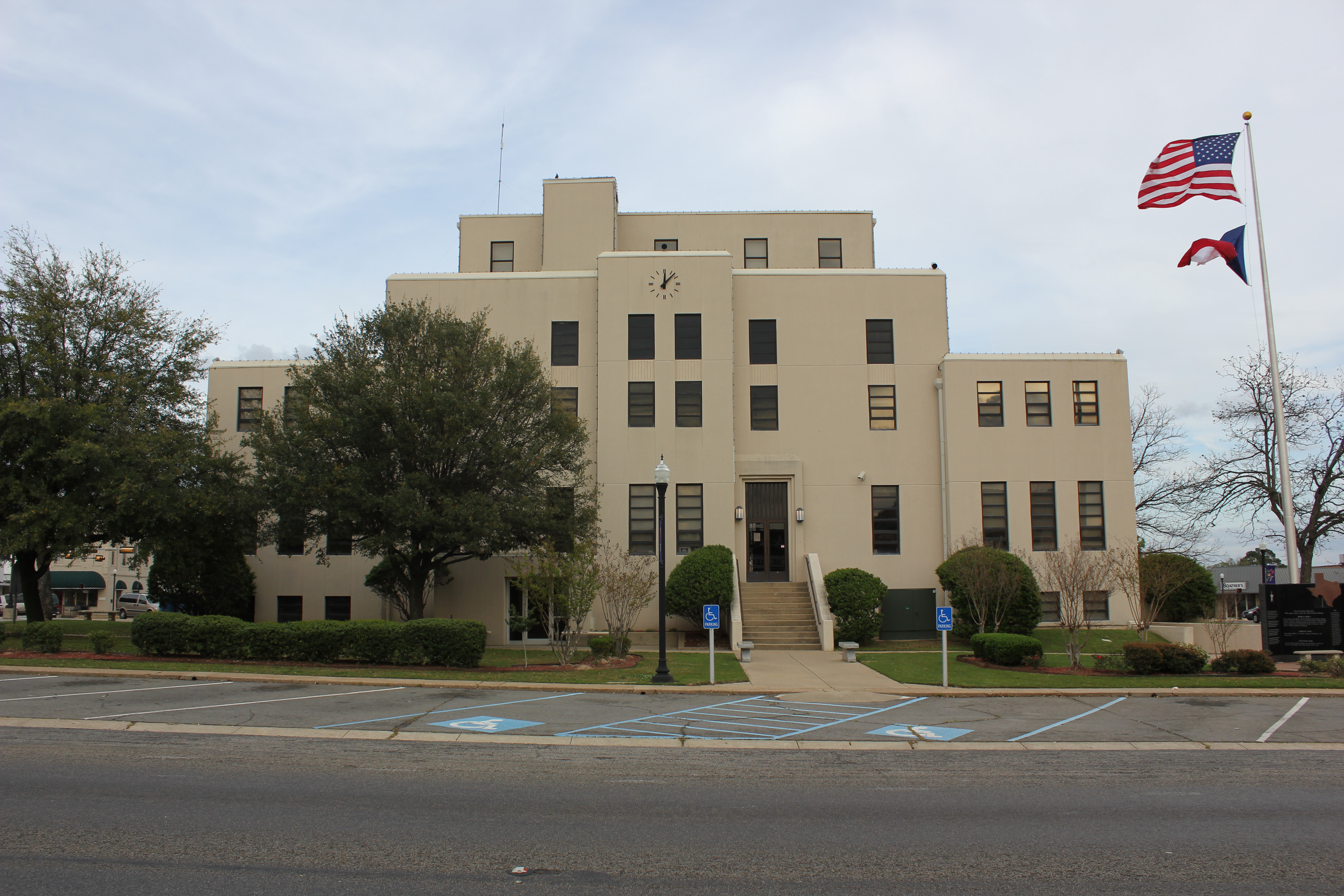
- The Titus County Courthouse in Mount Pleasant

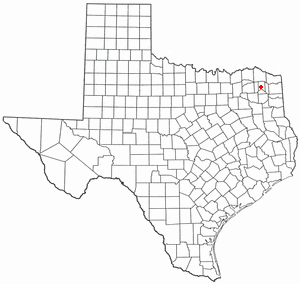
- Location of Mount Pleasant, Texas

- Coordinates: 33°9′28″N 94°58′12″W
- Country: United States
- State: Texas
- County: Titus

Area
  - Total: 15.99 sq mi (41.42 km^{2})
  - Land: 15.65 sq mi (40.53 km^{2})
  - Water: 0.34 sq mi (0.89 km^{2})
- Elevation: 404 ft (123 m)

Population (2020)
  - Total: 16,047
  - Density: 1,021.1/sq mi (394.23/km^{2})
- Time zone: UTC-6 (Central (CST))
  - Summer (DST): UTC-5 (CDT)
- ZIP codes: 75455-75456
- Area codes: 903, 430
- FIPS code: 48-49800
- GNIS feature ID: 1342094
- Website: mpcity.net

Mount Pleasant is the county seat of and largest city in Titus County, in the U.S. state of Texas. As of the 2020 census, Mount Pleasant's population was 16,047; it is situated in Northeast Texas.

== History ==
Mount Pleasant was founded May 11, 1848, to serve as county seat for Titus County, which was created by a legislative act on May 11, 1846. Until after the Civil War, Titus County also included the territory of present-day Franklin and Morris Counties. High waters along the creeks and the Sulphur River often halted travel in the early years.

In the 21st century, Titus County comprises the Mount Pleasant micropolitan statistical area, named for the county seat.

== Geography ==
Mount Pleasant is located at 33°9′28″N 94°58′12″W (33.157891, −94.970084).

According to the United States Census Bureau, the city has a total area of 12.7 square miles (33.0 km^{2}), of which 125 square miles (32.5 km^{2}) are land and 0.4 square miles (1 km^{2}) is covered by water.

== Climate ==
Mount Pleasant is considered to have a humid subtropical climate.

Climate data for Mount Pleasant, Texas (1991–2020 normals, extremes 1905–present)
Month	Jan	Feb	Mar	Apr	May	Jun	Jul	Aug	Sep	Oct	Nov	Dec	Year
Record high °F (°C)	86 (30)	91 (33)	92 (33)	97 (36)	106 (41)	107 (42)	112 (44)	118 (48)	109 (43)	104 (40)	91 (33)	88 (31)	118 (48)
Mean daily maximum °F (°C)	55.9 (13.3)	59.7 (15.4)	67.6 (19.8)	75.2 (24.0)	82.3 (27.9)	89.6 (32.0)	93.3 (34.1)	94.1 (34.5)	88.2 (31.2)	77.9 (25.5)	66.1 (18.9)	57.7 (14.3)	75.6 (24.2)
Daily mean °F (°C)	44.0 (6.7)	47.7 (8.7)	55.3 (12.9)	62.5 (16.9)	71.3 (21.8)	78.8 (26.0)	82.2 (27.9)	82.3 (27.9)	75.6 (24.2)	64.5 (18.1)	53.5 (11.9)	45.9 (7.7)	63.6 (17.6)
Mean daily minimum °F (°C)	32.0 (0.0)	35.7 (2.1)	42.9 (6.1)	49.8 (9.9)	60.2 (15.7)	68.1 (20.1)	71.1 (21.7)	70.6 (21.4)	63.1 (17.3)	51.2 (10.7)	40.9 (4.9)	34.1 (1.2)	51.6 (10.9)
Record low °F (°C)	−5 (−21)	−12 (−24)	11 (−12)	23 (−5)	34 (1)	48 (9)	50 (10)	48 (9)	36 (2)	23 (−5)	9 (−13)	−2 (−19)	−12 (−24)
Average precipitation inches (mm)	3.56 (90)	4.18 (106)	4.36 (111)	4.55 (116)	5.24 (133)	4.32 (110)	2.90 (74)	2.66 (68)	3.62 (92)	4.61 (117)	3.78 (96)	4.79 (122)	48.57 (1,234)
Average snowfall inches (cm)	0.6 (1.5)	1.0 (2.5)	0.1 (0.25)	0.0 (0.0)	0.0 (0.0)	0.0 (0.0)	0.0 (0.0)	0.0 (0.0)	0.0 (0.0)	0.0 (0.0)	0.0 (0.0)	0.2 (0.51)	1.9 (4.8)
Average precipitation days (≥ 0.01 in)	6.5	7.0	7.3	6.7	6.7	6.2	4.3	4.1	4.2	5.8	5.4	6.9	71.1
Average snowy days (≥ 0.1 in)	0.3	0.4	0.1	0.0	0.0	0.0	0.0	0.0	0.0	0.0	0.1	0.2	1.1
Source: NOAA

== Demographics ==
Historical population
Census	Pop.	Note	%±
1870	275		—
1880	452		64.4%
1890	963		113.1%
1910	3,137		—
1920	4,099		30.7%
1930	3,541		−13.6%
1940	4,528		27.9%
1950	6,342		40.1%
1960	8,027		26.6%
1970	9,459		17.8%
1980	11,003		16.3%
1990	12,291		11.7%
2000	13,935		13.4%
2010	15,564		11.7%
2020	16,047		3.1%
2019 (est.)	15,978		2.7%
U.S. Decennial Census

=== 2020 census ===
As of the 2020 census, Mount Pleasant had a population of 16,047. The median age was 32.3 years, 29.2% of residents were under the age of 18, and 12.7% of residents were 65 years of age or older. For every 100 females there were 91.8 males, and for every 100 females age 18 and over there were 88.1 males age 18 and over.

94.8% of residents lived in urban areas, while 5.2% lived in rural areas.

There were 5,371 households in Mount Pleasant, of which 42.1% had children under the age of 18 living in them, 45.7% were married-couple households, 16.4% were households with a male householder and no spouse or partner present, and 32.2% were households with a female householder and no spouse or partner present. About 25.0% of all households were made up of individuals and 10.6% had someone living alone who was 65 years of age or older.

There were 5,823 housing units, of which 7.8% were vacant. The homeowner vacancy rate was 2.4% and the rental vacancy rate was 7.7%.

Racial composition as of the 2020 census
Race	Number	Percent
White	6,213	38.7%
Black or African American	2,232	13.9%
American Indian and Alaska Native	220	1.4%
Asian	188	1.2%
Native Hawaiian and Other Pacific Islander	6	0.0%
Some other race	4,292	26.7%
Two or more races	2,896	18.0%
Hispanic or Latino (of any race)	8,826	55.0%

=== 2010 census ===
Mount Pleasant has grown since the 2000 census; as of the 2010 census, Mount Pleasant had a population of 15,564.

=== 2000 census ===
As of the 2000 census, 13,935 people, 4,558 households, and 3,208 families resided in the city. The population density was 1,112.0 inhabitants per square mile (429.3/km^{2}). The racial makeup of the city was 56.70% White, 16.00% African American, 0.55% Native American, 0.84% Asian, 23.58% from other races, and 2.33% from two or more races. Hispanics or Latinos of any race were 40.65% of the population.

In the city, the age distribution was 31.2% under 18, 10.9% from 18 to 24, 28.1% from 25 to 44, 16.2% from 45 to 64, and 13.6% who were 65 or older. The median age was 20 years. For every 100 females, there were 94.8 males. For every 100 females 18 and over, there were 89.6 males.

The median income for a household in the city was $28,805, and for a family was $32,331. Males had a median income of $22,629 versus $17,080 for females. The per capita income for the city was $14,190. About 20.3% of families and 22.8% of the population were below the poverty line, including 30.7% of those under age 18 and 16.1% of those age 65 or over.

== Arts and culture ==
- Titus County Courthouse—located at the Downtown Square, the courthouse is an important historical building. The courthouse has burned down three times since 1850. The current building was constructed in 1895 after a devastating fire in which the county records were destroyed. The courthouse was remodeled in 1940, 1962, and restored to its 1940 appearance in 1991.
- Downtown Square is bordered by several locally owned businesses.
- Mount Pleasant is the site of Wal-Mart's first store in Texas.
- Radar (2006–2008), the world's tallest living horse, lived in Mount Pleasant. (In 2005, Goliath was recorded as the world's tallest living horse by Guinness Book of World Records).
- Mount Pleasant is a nationally recognized Texas Main Street City under the program of the National Trust for Historic Preservation.
- One of the largest Dr. Pepper murals in the United States is located on the side of a building that once housed the Masonic lodge upstairs, and a grocery store downstairs.

== Education ==
The majority of the City of Mount Pleasant is served by the Mount Pleasant Independent School District. The southeastern portion is served by the Chapel Hill Independent School District. A smaller portion is served by the Harts Bluff Independent School District.

- Mount Pleasant High School is a 5A school. The mascot is the Tiger.
- Chapel Hill High School is a 3A school. The mascot is the Red Devil.
- Harts Bluff Early College High School is a 2A school. The mascot is the Bulldog.

Northeast Texas Community College is also located in Mount Pleasant, near the Chapel Hill school district.

== Media ==
The Mount Pleasant Tribune is a weekly newspaper which was founded in 1941.

== Infrastructure ==
=== Transportation ===
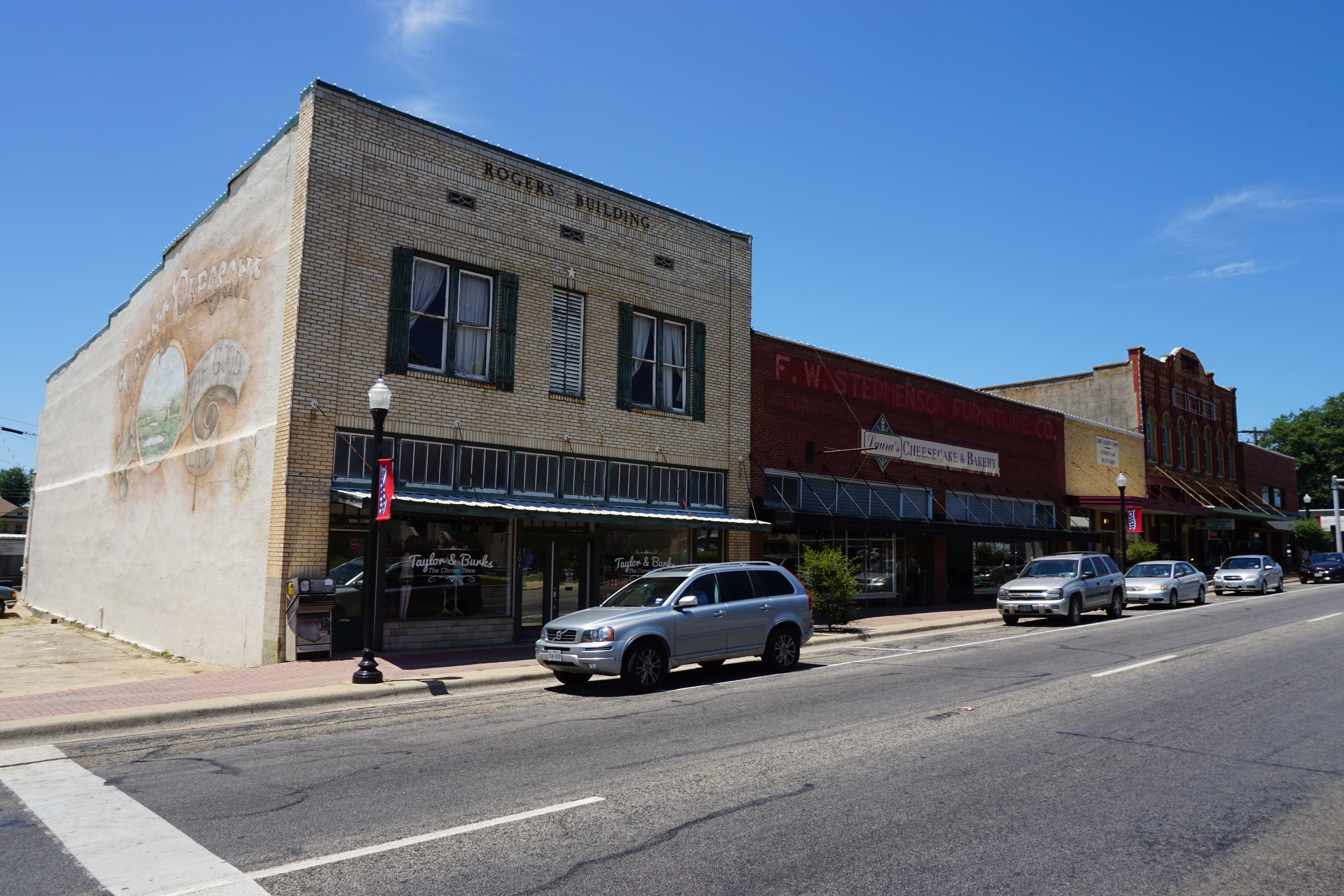
Madison Avenue in Mount Pleasant

A major project underway to build a 271 loop bypass around Mount Pleasant was completed in 2015.

The Mount Pleasant Regional Airport is located three miles from the city.

=== Healthcare ===
The City of Mount Pleasant is served by Titus Regional Medical Center.

=== Postal service ===
The United States Postal Service operates the Mount Pleasant Post Office.

=== Parole office ===
The Texas Department of Criminal Justice (TDCJ) operates the Mount Pleasant District Parole Office in Mount Pleasant.

== Notable people ==
- Melvin Aldridge, former professional football player
- Krista Branch, singer of the song "I Am America," referred to as the anthem of the Tea Party movement
- Maury Buford, punter for 1985 Chicago Bears Super Bowl team
- Norm Duke, PBA bowler
- Michael Kopech, professional baseball pitcher
- Barry Minter, former National Football League (NFL) linebacker for the Chicago Bears and Cleveland Browns, appeared in 16 games for Cleveland in 2001 before retiring to Mount Pleasant
- Ray Price, country music singer
- Bill Ratliff, politician
- Jason Roy, lead singer of the Dove Award-winning Christian rock band Building 429
- Sam W. Russell, Texas legislator and lawyer
- Jerry Scoggins, American country/western singer, guitarist, and band leader, most noted for singing "The Ballad of Jed Clampett", the theme song of the 1960s sitcom The Beverly Hillbillies
- Chaun Thompson, former NFL linebacker for the Houston Texans
