= Winfield, Texas =

City in Titus County, Texas, United States

- City
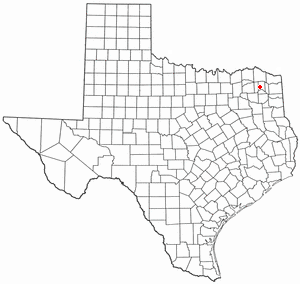
- Location of Winfield, Texas

- Coordinates: 33°09′57″N 95°06′38″W
- Country: United States
- State: Texas
- County: Titus

Area
  - Total: 0.79 sq mi (2.04 km^{2})
  - Land: 0.78 sq mi (2.01 km^{2})
  - Water: 0.012 sq mi (0.03 km^{2})
- Elevation: 446 ft (136 m)

Population (2020)
  - Total: 422
  - Density: 544/sq mi (210/km^{2})
- Time zone: UTC-6 (Central (CST))
  - Summer (DST): UTC-5 (CDT)
- ZIP code: 75493
- Area codes: 903, 430
- FIPS code: 48-79720
- GNIS feature ID: 2412281
- Website: www.winfieldtx.com

Winfield is a small city in Titus County, Texas, United States. The population was 422 at the 2020 census.

== History ==
Winfield's history includes (in addition to railroad operations) coal mining, brick and pottery manufacturing, and the famous Winfield Truck Stop.

When the Texas and St. Louis Railway was being constructed through western Titus County in 1880, the citizens of Gray Rock, on the western boundary of the county, were asked to donate money and land to the company for routing the road through their community. When the merchants refused to cooperate, W. C. Barrett deeded a portion of his land a mile northeast of Gray Rock to railroad officials for a depot, and the road was built north of Gray Rock. At its earliest stages the community that began to emerge around the depot was called Barrett, but when the post office was opened there in 1887, with Patrick H. Carr as postmaster, the village was called Carr. In 1892 the name was changed to Winfield, in honor of the general passenger agent for the railroad, W. H. Winfield. In 1890, the population was reported at forty-seven. By 1896 the town had three churches, several stores, a pottery operated by J. S. Hogue, and a population estimated at 150. During the early years of the twentieth century, the town experienced its greatest period of growth. By 1914 it had a brick company, a newspaper, numerous stores and gins, two banks, and a population estimated at 700. The two banks merged in 1919, and the resulting bank closed in the early 1920s. By 1925 the population of Winfield had declined to 629, and by the 1940s it was 350. The town was incorporated in the 1940s and maintained a relatively stable population for several decades. In 1980 residents numbered 349, and in 1982 the town had five rated businesses. In 1990, the population was 345.

== Geography ==
Located on Interstate 30, approximately halfway between Mount Pleasant and Mount Vernon, Winfield is the second largest town in Titus County.

According to the United States Census Bureau, the city has a total area of 0.9 square mile (2.4 km^{2}), of which 0.9 square mile (2.4 km^{2}) is land and 1.06% is water.

=== Climate ===
The climate in this area is characterized by hot, humid summers and generally mild to cool winters. According to the Köppen Climate Classification system, Winfield has a humid subtropical climate, abbreviated "Cfa" on climate maps.

== Demographics ==
Historical population
Census	Pop.	Note	%±
1950	319		—
1960	251		−21.3%
1970	268		6.8%
1980	349		30.2%
1990	345		−1.1%
2000	499		44.6%
2010	524		5.0%
2020	422		−19.5%
U.S. Decennial Census

=== 2020 census ===
As of the 2020 census, Winfield had a population of 422, with 137 households and 129 families residing in the city. The median age was 32.2 years; 30.8% of residents were under the age of 18 and 11.1% of residents were 65 years of age or older. For every 100 females there were 99.1 males, and for every 100 females age 18 and over there were 100.0 males age 18 and over.

0.0% of residents lived in urban areas, while 100.0% lived in rural areas.

There were 137 households in Winfield, of which 56.9% had children under the age of 18 living in them. Of all households, 59.1% were married-couple households, 16.1% were households with a male householder and no spouse or partner present, and 18.2% were households with a female householder and no spouse or partner present. About 9.5% of all households were made up of individuals and 3.6% had someone living alone who was 65 years of age or older.

There were 147 housing units, of which 6.8% were vacant. The homeowner vacancy rate was 0.0% and the rental vacancy rate was 2.4%.

Racial composition as of the 2020 census
Race	Number	Percent
White	203	48.1%
Black or African American	7	1.7%
American Indian and Alaska Native	9	2.1%
Asian	1	0.2%
Native Hawaiian and Other Pacific Islander	0	0.0%
Some other race	90	21.3%
Two or more races	112	26.5%
Hispanic or Latino (of any race)	288	68.2%

== Education ==
Winfield is now served by Mount Pleasant Independent School District for grades K–12. Mount Pleasant High School is the local high school.

Winfield Independent School District served Winfield until 2018. Winfield ISD had one school, Winfield Elementary, that served students in grades kindergarten through eight, while Mount Pleasant ISD and Mount Pleasant HS served the district at the high school level only.

== See also ==
- List of municipalities in Texas
