= Winfield Independent School District =

Defunct school district in Texas, United States

Winfield Independent School District was a public school district based in Winfield, Texas (USA).

In addition to Winfield, the district also served the town of Miller's Cove. Winfield ISD had one school, Winfield Elementary, that served students in grades kindergarten through eight, while Mount Pleasant Independent School District and Mount Pleasant High School served the district at the high school level only.

In 2009, the school district was rated "recognized" by the Texas Education Agency (TEA).

In its final year of operation, 2018, it had fewer than 200 students. From 2014 to 2018 there were attempts to improve the district. In 2018 it lost its accreditation from the TEA. On July 1 of that year it was consolidated into Mount Pleasant ISD.
