= Mount Pleasant Independent School District =

School district in Texas

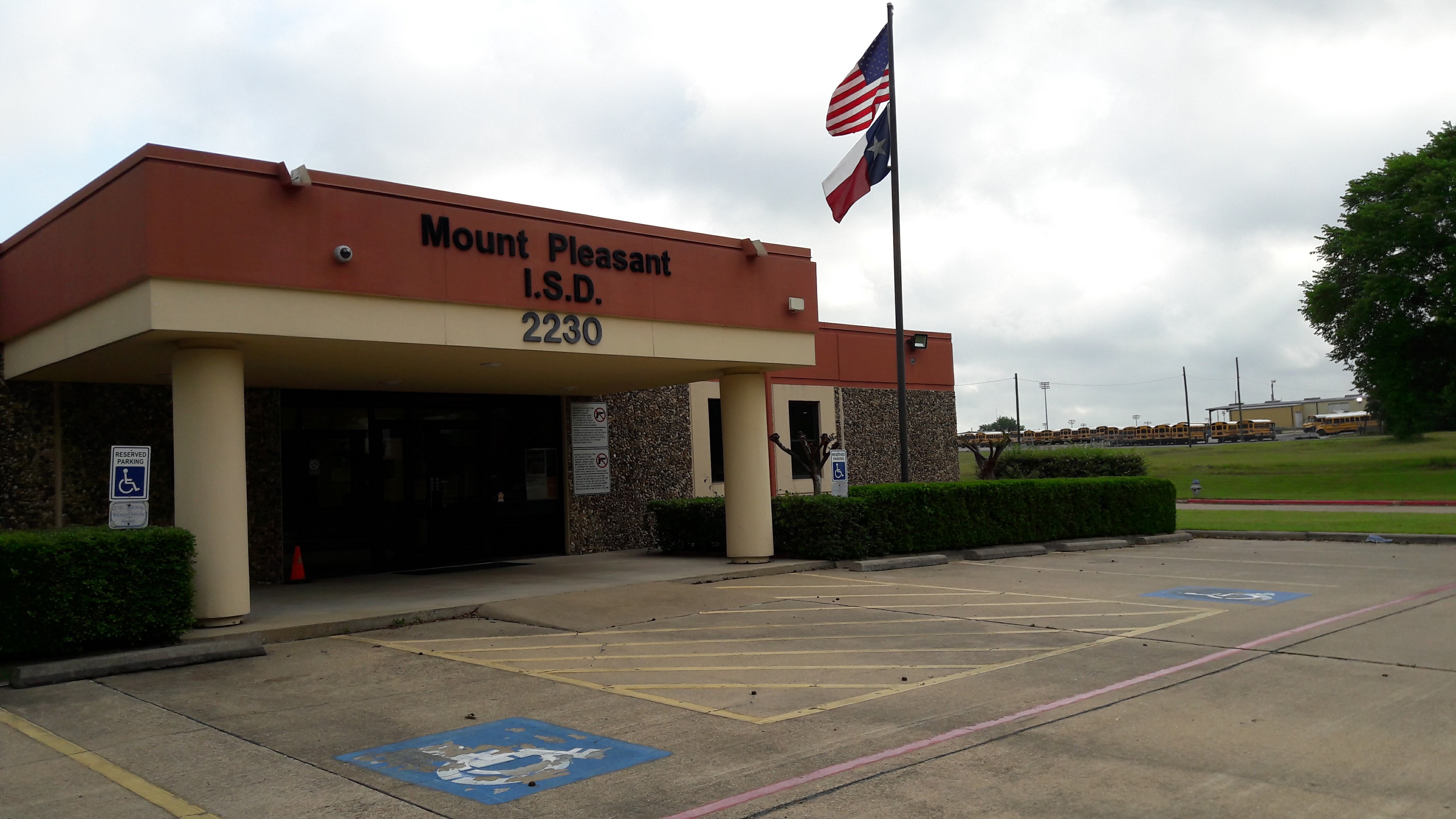
Mount Pleasant ISD building.

Mount Pleasant Independent School District is a public school district based in Mount Pleasant, Texas (USA).

It serves the majority of Mount Pleasant, Winfield, and Millers Cove. In addition to students in the Mount Pleasant area, the district also serves high school students from Harts Bluff Independent School District.

In 2009, the school district was rated "academically acceptable" by the Texas Education Agency.

On July 1, 2018 the Winfield Independent School District was consolidated into Mount Pleasant ISD. Prior to the merger, Mount Pleasant ISD only served high school students from Winfield ISD territory, including Winfield and Millers Cove.

== Schools ==
Secondary:

- Mount Pleasant High School (9-12)
- Mount Pleasant Junior High School (7-8)

Primary:

- P.E. Wallace Middle School (5-6)
- E.C. Brice Elementary (K-4)
- Frances Corprew Elementary (K-4)
- Vivian Fowler Elementary (K-4)
- Annie Sims Elementary (K-4)

Other campuses:

- Child Development Center (Head Start and Pre-Kindergarten)
- Community Learning Center (Even Start and GED Programs)
- Discipline Alternative Education Program (D.A.E.P)
