= List of Spanish-language newspapers published in the United States =

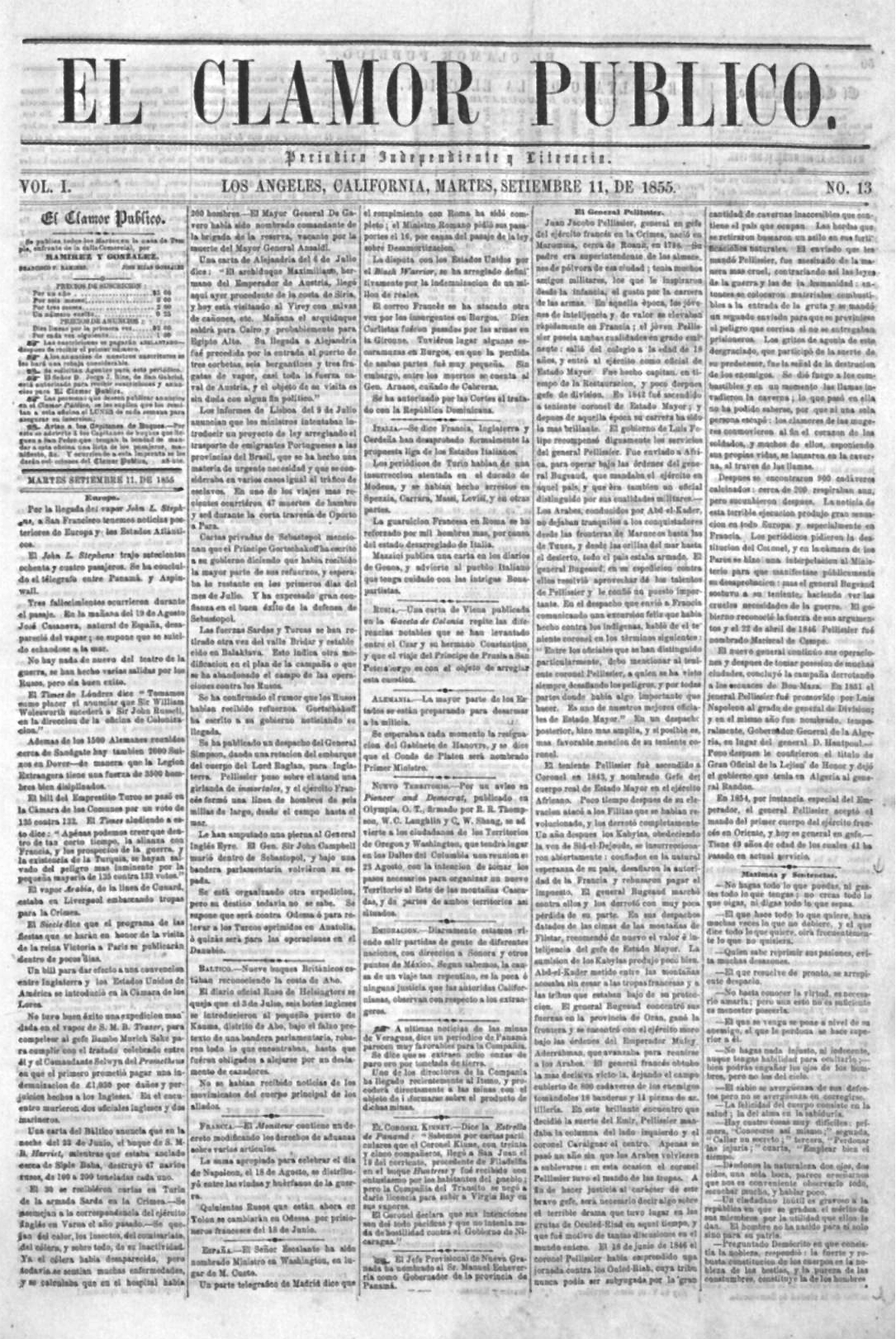
El Clamor Publico, Los Angeles, 1855

This is a list of Spanish-language newspapers published in the United States.

== Current ==
=== United States ===
| Title | State | City | Year est. | Notes |
|---|---|---|---|---|
| Accion Newspaper | Georgia | Atlanta | 2004 | |
| Acento Latino | North Carolina | Fayetteville | 1999 | |
| Las Américas Newspaper | Virginia | Falls Church | | |
| La Cara | Texas | Mexia, Waco | | |
| La Conexión | North Carolina | Raleigh | 1995 | |
| El Conquistador | Illinois | Geneva | 1993 | Merged with Reflejos in 2011 |
| Cronicas Newspaper | California | San Francisco | 2006 | www.cronicasnews.com |
| Al Día | Pennsylvania | Philadelphia | | |
| Al Día | Texas | Dallas | | |
| El Diario de El Paso | Texas | El Paso | 2005 | |
| El Diario La Prensa | New York | New York City | 1913 | |
| Diario Las Américas | Florida | Miami | | |
| Enterate Latino Spanish Language Newspaper | Colorado | Grand Junction, Colorado: Mesa County, Colorado, Delta County, Colorado, Montrose County, Colorado, Gunnison County, Colorado, San Miguel County, Colorado, Montrose, Colorado, Delta, Colorado: Fruita, Colorado, Gunnison, Colorado, Telluride, Colorado, Rifle, Colorado, Glenwood Springs, Colorado, Olathe, Colorado. | 2012 | Monthly. www.enteratelatino.org |
| El Especialito | New Jersey, New York, Florida | Northeastern New Jersey: Hudson, Bergen, Passaic County, Essex, Union, Middlesex. New York City: Washington Heights, West Side, Lower East Side, The Bronx, East Harlem, Jackson Heights, and Brooklyn.Florida: Miami. | 1985 | |
| La Gaceta | Florida | Tampa | | |
| Hispanic news | Oregon | Portland | 1981 | |
| Hoy | California | Los Angeles | | Also published in Chicago, IL |
| Hoy | Illinois | Chicago | | Also published in Los Angeles, CA |
| Impacto Latin News | Pennsylvania | Philadelphia | | |
| Impacto Latino | New York | New York City | | |
| La Jornada Latina | Ohio | Cincinnati | | |
| El Latino de Hoy | Oregon | Salem | 1992 | |
| Latin Opinion | Maryland | Baltimore | 2004 | |
| Latino Press | Michigan | Detroit | 1993 | |
| El Latino Expreso | New Jersey | Trenton | | |
| New Jersey Hispano Newspaper | New Jersey | | 2009 | hispanonewjersey.com. |
| Noticia | New York | Long Island | | |
| Noticias Latinas | Oregon | Portland | 1995? | |
| Noticias Libres | Tennessee | Chattanooga | | |
| El Nuevo Georgia | Georgia | Norcross | 1998 | |
| El Nuevo Herald | Florida | Miami | 1987 | |
| El Nuevo Heraldo | Texas | Brownsville | 2009 | |
| El Observador | California | San Jose | | |
| La Opinión | California | Los Angeles | 1926 | |
| La Opinion | Texas | Jacksonville, Texas | 1989 | www.laopinionentexas.com |
| El Periódico USA | Texas | McAllen | | |
| El Planeta | Massachusetts | Boston | 2005 | |
| La Prensa | Michigan and Ohio | Detroit, Toledo and Cleveland | | |
| La Prensa de Colorado | Colorado | Denver | 2010 | |
| La Prensa de Minnesota | Minnesota | Minneapolis | | |
| El Puente | Indiana | Goshen | | |
| Que Pasa | North Carolina | Charlotte | 2002 | |
| La Raza | Illinois | Chicago | 1970 | www.laraza.com |
| Rumbo | Massachusetts | Lawrence | 1996 | |
| Rumbo | Texas | San Antonio, Houston, Austin, McAllen | 2004 | (no longer in print) |
| El Sentinel | Florida | Orlando | | |
| El Sentinel del Sur de la Florida | Florida | Deerfield Beach | 2002 | |
| El Sol | Connecticut | Stamford | | |
| El Sol Latino | Massachusetts | Amherst | | |
| Sol de Medianoche | Alaska | Anchorage | 2016 | soldemedianochenews.org. |
| The Spanish Journal | Wisconsin | Milwaukee | 2012 | |
| El Tecolote (newspaper) | California | San Francisco | | |
| El Tiempo Latino | Washington, D.C. | Washington, D.C. | | |
| Vida Latina | Georgia | Atlanta | | |
| Vision Hispana Newspaper | California | Alameda | 2003 | |
| El Vocero Hispano | Michigan | Grand Rapids | 1993 | |
| La Voz | Arizona | Phoenix | 2000 | |
| La Voz Bilingüe | Colorado | Thornton | 1974 | |
| La Voz de Houston | Texas | Houston | 1979 | |
| La Vanguardia USA | Ohio | Cincinnati | 2008 | lavanguardiausa.com. |
| Washington Hispanic | Maryland | Silver Spring | 1994 | |
| Westchester Hispano Newspaper | New York | White Plains | 2006 | westchesterhispano.net. |

=== U.S. territories ===
| Title | Territory | City | Year est. | Notes |
|---|---|---|---|---|
| Claridad | Puerto Rico | San Juan | 1959 | |
| La Estrella Norte | Puerto Rico | Mayagüez | 1983 | |
| La Estrella Oeste | Puerto Rico | Mayagüez | 1983 | |
| El Laurel Sureño (Note: DBA, Periodico El Laurel, aka, "PEL") | Puerto Rico | Ponce | 2010 | El Laurel Sureño, Inc. |
| Es Noticia | Puerto Rico | Ponce | 2015 | SCC Comunicaciones LLC; Biweekly |
| El Nuevo Día | Puerto Rico | Guaynabo | 1909 | |
| La Opinión del Sur | Puerto Rico | Ponce | 2001 | Periódico El Oriental, Inc. |
| El Oriental | Puerto Rico | Humacao | 1980 | |
| Periódico La Esquina | Puerto Rico | Maunabo | | |
| La Perla del Sur | Puerto Rico | Ponce | 1982 | La Perla del Sur, Inc.; Omar Alfonso, editor. |
| Primera Hora | Puerto Rico | Guaynabo | 1997 | |
| El Sol de Puerto Rico | Puerto Rico | Ponce | 2012 | Periodico El Sol de Puerto Rico |
| Voces del Sur | Puerto Rico | Ponce | 2010 | Nexo Comunicaciones Inc. |
| El Vocero | Puerto Rico | San Juan | 1974 | |

== Defunct ==
=== United States ===
| Title | State | City | Year est. | Year ceased | Notes |
|---|---|---|---|---|---|
| El Audaz | Florida | Ybor City | 1907 | 1907 | |
| El Anunciador | Texas | Houston | | | |
| El Bejeraño | Texas | San Antonio | 1855 | ? | ENGL Trans: The Bejar County |
| Boletin Del Comite De Defensa | Florida | Tampa | 1938 | ? | |
| Boletin Popular | New Mexico | Santa Fe | | | |
| Centinela De La Libertad | Florida | Miami | 1963 | ? | |
| El Clamor Publico | California | Los Angeles | 1855 | 1859 | |
| Comercia | Florida | Tampa | | | |
| El Comercio Mexicano | Texas | Brownsville | 1886 | ? | ENGL Trans: Mexican Commerce |
| La Cronica | Texas | Laredo | 1909 | ? | ENGL Trans: The Chronicle |
| La Cucaracha | Colorado | Pueblo, Colorado | 1976 | 1983 | ENGL Trans: The Cockroach |
| Cultura Obrera | New York | New York | 1911 | 1927 | Anarchist newspaper. |
| Cultura Proletaria | New York | New York | 1927 | 1953 | Anarchist newspaper. |
| El Defensor del Pueblo | Texas | Edinburg | 1930 | ? | |
| El Despertar | New York | New York | 1891 | 1902 | Anarchist newspaper |
| El Día | Texas | Houston | 1982 | | |
| El Eco del Pacifico | California | San Francisco | | | |
| El Esclavo | Florida | Tampa | 1894 | 1898 | Anarchist newspaper. |
| Espana Libre | New York | New York | 1839 | | |
| Exodo Al Combate | Florida | Miami | 1971 | ? | |
| Filipino | Washington, D.C | Washington, D.C. | | | |
| La Frontera | Texas | McAllen | 2004 | | |
| El Fronterizo | Arizona | Tucscon | 1878 | 1914 | |
| La Fuerza | Texas | | 1962 | | |
| Fuerza Consciente | New York | New York | 1913 | 1914 | Anarchist newspaper. |
| La Gaceta Mexicana | Texas | Houston | 1928 | | |
| El Grito del Norte | New Mexico | Española | 1968 | | |
| El Hablador | Louisiana | New Orleans | 1845 | | |
| Hacienda | New York | Buffalo | 1905 | | |
| Hispano Americano | California | San Diego | | | |
| El Imparcial de Texas | Texas | San Antonio | 1908 | 1924 | |
| El Libre Pensador | Texas | Brownsville | 1890 | ? | ENGL Trans::The Free Thinker |
| Mensajero | Arizona | Phoenix | | | |
| El Mensajero Semanal de Nueva York | New York | New York | 1828 | | |
| El Mercurio de Nueva York | New York | New York | 1828 | | |
| Mexico | Illinois | Chicago | 1922 | | |
| El Misisipi | Louisiana | New Orleans | 1808 | 1810 | |
| El Mensagero Luisianés | Louisiana | New Orleans | 1809 | 1811 | |
| El Mulato | New York | New York | 1854 | | |
| Noticias del Mundo | New York | New York | 1980 | 2004 | |
| Noticioso de Ambos Mundos | New York | New York | 1836 | | |
| Patria | New York | New York | 1892 | | |
| Pluma Roja | California | Los Angeles | 1913 | 1915 | Anarchist newspaper. |
| Popular | California | Los Angeles | | | |
| Pueblo | Florida | Miami | 1969 | ? | |
| Punto Rojo | Texas | El Paso | 1909 | 1910 | Anarchist newspaper. |
| La Raza Latina | New York | New York | | | |
| El Regidor | Texas | San Antonio | 1888 | 1916 | ENGL Trans: The Regent |
| La Revista | Florida | Tampa | | | |
| Revista Agricola | Illinois | Chicago | | | |
| La Revista Católica | New Mexico | Las Vegas | 1875 | 1962 | |
| Sancho Panza | Wisconsin | Milwaukee | 1930s | | |
| La Semana | Florida | Orlando | 1981 | | Oviedo Publishing Co. |
| La Sociedad | California | San Francisco | 1869 | 1895 | |
| La Tribuna | Texas | Houston | | | |
| Tampa Illustrado | Florida | Tampa | 1912 | 1913 | |
| El Tecolote | California | San Francisco | | | |
| El Tecolote | Texas | Houston | | | |
| Tierra! | New York | New York | 1930 | 1930 | Anarchist newspaper. |
| El Tucsonense | Arizona | Tucson | 1915 | 1957 | |
| La Verdad | New York | New York | 1848 | | |
| La Voz del Pueblo | New Mexico | | 1889 | 1924 | |
| La Voz Unida | Oregon | Portland | 1973 | | |
| Zig-Zag Libre | Florida | Miami | 1960 | 1983 | |

=== U.S. territories ===
| Title | State | City | Year est. | Year ceased | Notes |
|---|---|---|---|---|---|
| La Democracia | Puerto Rico | Ponce | 1890 | 1948 | |
| El Imparcial | Puerto Rico | San Juan | 1918 | | |
| El Mundo | Puerto Rico | San Juan | 1919 | | |

== See also ==
- List of Spanish-language television networks in the United States

== Bibliography ==
- "List of Newspapers and Periodicals Printed Wholly or in Part in Languages Other Than English: Spanish", Geo. P. Rowell and Co.'s American Newspaper Directory, New York: Geo. P. Rowell & Co., 1880
- "Publications in Foreign Languages: Spanish", Ayer & Son's American Newspaper Annual, Philadelphia: N. W. Ayer & Son, 1907, hdl:2027/ien.35556000550921
- "Publications in Foreign Languages: Spanish", Ayer & Son's American Newspaper Annual, Philadelphia: N. W. Ayer & Son, 1921, hdl:2027/uc1.$b436690
- "Mas de cuatroceintos periodicos en espanol se han editado en los Estados Unidos" [More than 400 newspapers in Spanish have been published in the United States], La Prensa (in Spanish), San Antonio, Texas, February 13, 1938 (List of titles)
- Raymond R. MacCurdy (1954). "Tentative Bibliography of the Spanish-Language Press in Louisiana, 1808-1871". The Americas. 10 (3). Academy of American Franciscan History: 307–329. doi:10.2307/977937. JSTOR 977937.
- F. Gutierrez (1977). "Spanish-language media in America: background, resources and history". Journalism History. 4 (2): 34–68. doi:10.1080/00947679.1977.12066840.
- Luis Leal (1989). "Spanish-Language Press". Americas Review. 17.
- Rafael Chabran; Richard Chabran (1993). "Spanish-language and Latino press of the United States: Newspapers and Periodicals". Handbook of Hispanic Cultures in the United States: Literature and Art. Houston, Texas: Arte Público Press. p. 360+. ISBN 1558850740.
- Nicolas Kanellos (1994). "Socio-Historic Study of Hispanic Newspapers in the United States". Handbook of Hispanic Cultures in the United States: Sociology. Houston, Texas: Arte Público Press. p. 239+. ISBN 1558851011.
- Federico A. Subervi-Velez (1994). "Mass Communication and Hispanics". Handbook of Hispanic Cultures in the United States: Sociology. Houston, Texas: Arte Público Press. p. 304+. ISBN 1558851011.
- Robert B. Kent; Maura E. Huntz (1996). "Spanish-Language Newspapers in the United States". Geographical Review. 86 (3): 446–456. doi:10.2307/215508. hdl:10211.3/217786. JSTOR 215508.
- Nicolás Kanellos; Helvetia Martell (2000), Hispanic Periodicals in the United States, Origins to 1960, Houston, TX: Arte Publico Press, ISBN 1558852530 – via Google Books
- Cordelia Chávez Candelaria, ed. (2004). "Newspapers and Periodicals". Encyclopedia of Latino Popular Culture. Vol. 1. Greenwood Press. p. 588. ISBN 9780313332104.
- Peter R. Eisenstadt; Laura-Eve Moss, eds. (2005). "Ethnic Press: Spanish Language". Encyclopedia Of New York State. Syracuse University Press. ISBN 9780815608080.
- A. Gabriel Meléndez (2005), Spanish-Language Newspapers in New Mexico, 1834-1958, Tucson, Ariz: University of Arizona Press, ISBN 0816524726
- Michael Fuhlhage; Lucila Vargas (2011). "Spanish-Language Newspapers". In Allison Graham; Sharon Monteith (eds.). Media. New Encyclopedia of Southern Culture. Vol. 18. Chapel Hill: University of North Carolina Press. pp. 142–146. ISBN 9780807869130. OCLC 910189354.
- Juan Gonzalez; Joseph Torres (2011). "Early Spanish-language Press". News for All the People: The Epic Story of Race and the American Media. Verso Books. ISBN 978-1-84467-942-3.
