= Rumbo (Texas newspapers) =

Rumbo (meaning "heading to" as in "heading to the United States") is a chain of Spanish-language newspapers headquartered in Texas, with editions in San Antonio, Houston, and the Rio Grande Valley. It was originally headquartered in San Antonio but later moved its offices to Houston. It was initially a daily publication, but the frequency later changed to weekly. By 2014, it was no longer in print and became online-only.

== History ==
It was established in 2004 by Colombia-born Edward Schumacher Matos and Jonathan Friedland. Both men both formerly worked for The Wall Street Journal, the former as an editor and the latter as the Los Angeles bureau chief, and Schumacher also formerly worked for The New York Times as a foreign correspondent. The Spanish company Recoletos spent $16.5 million to develop Rumbo. The company Meximerica Media launched the newspaper, which initially had a daily frequency.

As of 2005 the daily circulation was 100,000, and there were 86 editorial staff originating from various countries. Regular contributors to the newspaper included the writers Carlos Fuentes and Mario Vargas Llosa. As a result of the establishment of Rumbo, English language newspapers in Texas acquired smaller Spanish language papers and/or established their own Spanish language divisions in order to compete with Rumbo. In 2006 Rumbo laid off about 25% of the employees who worked at the San Antonio headquarters. It was previously distributed in the Austin metropolitan area, but in April 2006 Austin distribution ended. By 2007 the paper was a weekly, not daily, publication.

In 2007 ImpreMedia LLC had acquired Rumbo.

The paper, initially headquartered in San Antonio, later relocated its offices to Houston.

Eventually the San Antonio and Valley editions ceased, so only the Houston edition remained.

Until circa January 2014 Jesús Del Toro was the Rumbo editor and general manager. By then he was promoted to ImpreMedia's editorial director for all weekly publications. Around that time Rumbo, which was using freelance writers, received a new local editor.

The final print edition of Rumbo was on May 30, 2014. On June 6 of that year the paper announced that there would be no more print versions, with online versions remaining, due to reduction of costs.

== See also ==
- List of Spanish-language newspapers published in the United States
- Hispanics and Latinos in Texas
- Hispanics and Latinos in Houston
