= South Main (disambiguation) =

South Main is an area of Vancouver that centers on Main Street.

South Main may also refer to:

- South Main Arts District, Memphis, Tennessee, United States
- South Main, Houston, Texas, United States
  - South Main Baptist Church, a Baptist church in Houston, Texas

== See also ==
- East Main
- North Main
- West Main (disambiguation)
