= El Diario de El Paso =

Spanish-language newspaper

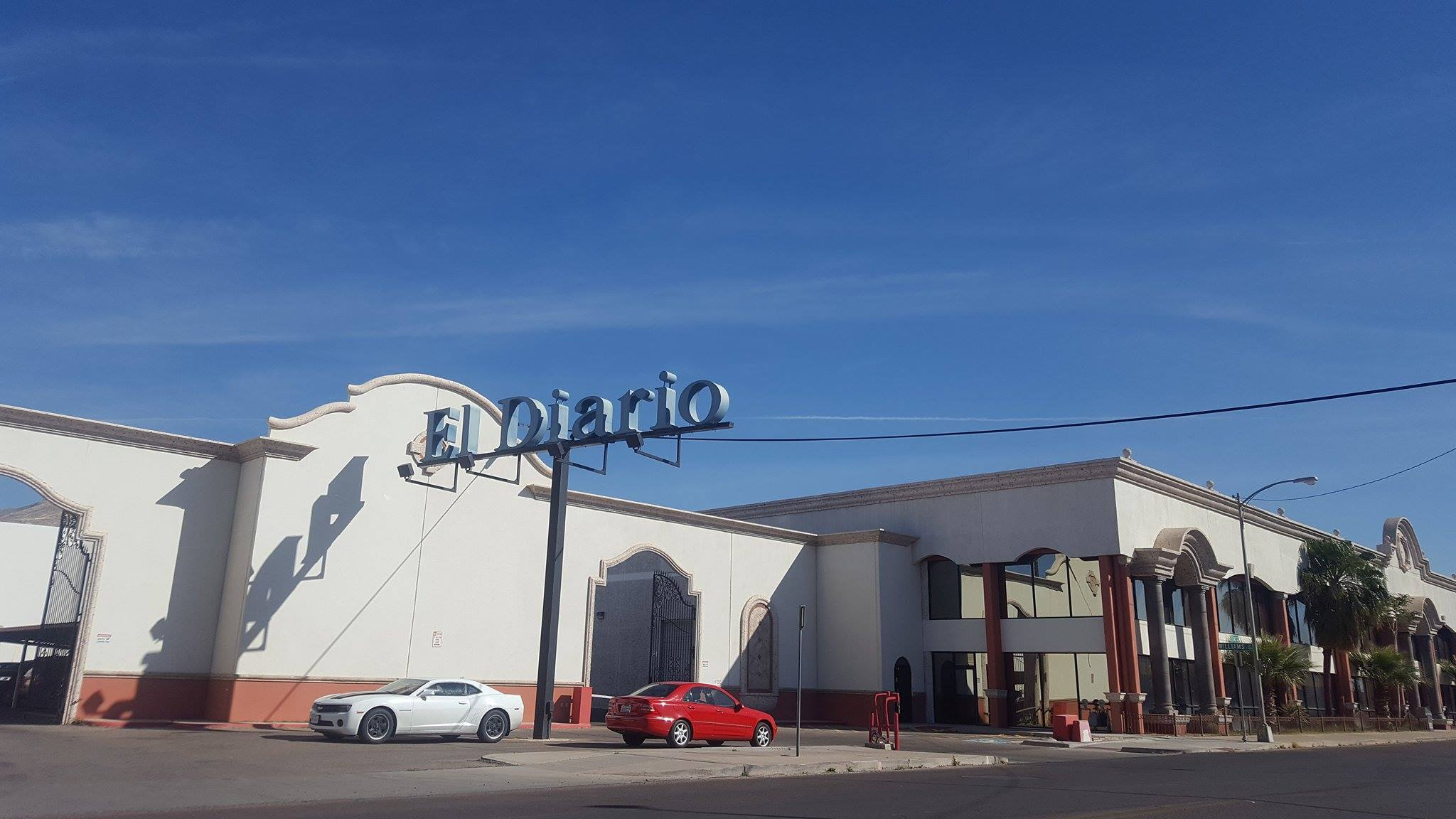
- El Diario de El Paso building circa April, 2017
- Type: Daily newspaper
- Format: Broadsheet
- Publisher: Gerardo J. Rodríguez
- Founded: May 16, 2005
- Headquarters: 1801 Texas Avenue; El Paso, TX 79901; United States
- Website: http://www.diariousa.com

The El Diario de El Paso is the primary Spanish-language newspaper for the U.S. city of El Paso, Texas. The paper was founded on May 16, 2005, by El Diario de Juárez. It originally started out as a Mexican newspaper circulated throughout Ciudad Juárez under the name Diario de Juárez. In 1982 Diario de Juárez entered into the El Paso business community by opening a small sales and circulation office. The company became incorporated in Texas as Editora Paso del Norte, Inc..

The newspaper has a daily circulation of over 20,000 copies (100,000 readers) throughout El Paso. The paper is intended to reach young, active adults (target audience 18- 35) of Hispanic descent in El Paso.

== History ==
Founded in February 1976, Diario de Juárez has grown from a 1,000-copy per day newspaper in Ciudad Juárez to now over 100,000 copies daily in Cd. Juárez, in the city of Chihuahua and throughout the state of Chihuahua. Today, El Diario is the fourth largest newspaper in Mexico.

In 1985 Diario de Chihuahua was established, and a modern five-story office building was constructed.

In 1999 the newspapers changed the name and banner from Diario de Juarez and Diario de Chihuahua to El Diario to better serve the readers in the State of Chihuahua and in El Paso. Also in 1999, a new press facility was completed in Chihuahua with the latest and most modern newspaper production equipment. Today, the Chihuahua edition of El Diario publishes daily editions for the central communities of Delicias, Cuauhtemoc and Parral.

In 2000 El Diario began publishing a weekly Mexico section, which covers the news of Mexico, somewhat like USA Today does for the US.

The Juárez edition of El Diario, which publishes a daily edition for Nuevo Casas Grandes, also produces an El Paso edition of El Diario on Tuesdays, Thursdays and Saturdays.

On May 29, 2001, Editora Paso del Norte, Inc. purchased the historic 7-story Southern Pacific Railroad building in downtown El Paso. Bank of America is a tenant on the first two floors, and the corporate offices of Editora are on the seventh floor.

Along with the main building, Editora acquired the adjacent office building, two parking lots and a tri-level parking garage.

In 2003, Editora purchased another piece of property at 1801 Texas Avenue in downtown El Paso. On May 16, 2005, Editora launched El Diario de El Paso, El Paso's first daily Spanish-language newspaper.

On November 10, 2014. El Diario de El Paso launched The New York Times International Weekly inserted every Monday at the daily newspaper.

== Other publications ==
El Diario also publishes several other weekly, biweekly and monthly publications.

- Looking at El Paso: weekly, colorful lifestyle and entertainment newspaper published every Friday in El Paso by El Diario.
- El Diario, Juarez Edition: Daily, the dominant newspaper group in the State of Chihuahua, with the largest and most- read newspaper in Ciudad Juárez and Chihuahua City.
- El Diario, Chihuahua Edition: Daily, covers the central and southern regions of the State of Chihuahua circulating in Chihuahua City, Delicias, Cuauhtemoc and Parral.

== See also ==
- List of Spanish-language newspapers published in the United States
