= Hispanics and Latinos in Houston =

Ethnic group in Houston

The Hispanic population in Houston is increasing as more immigrants from Latin American countries come to work in the area. As of 2006 the city has the third-largest Hispanic population in the United States. As of 2011, the city is 44% Hispanic. As of 2011, of the city's U.S. citizens that are Hispanic, half are age 18 or older, and are therefore at the age range eligible to vote. As of 2011 many Hispanics in Houston are not U.S. citizens, especially those living in Gulfton and Spring Branch, and are therefore ineligible to vote in elections. As a result, Hispanics have proportionally less representation in the municipal government than other ethnic groups. As of April 2011 two of the Houston City Council members are Hispanic, making up 18% of the council.

As of 2010, John B. Strait and Gang Gong, authors of "Ethnic Diversity in Houston, Texas: The Evolution of Residential Segregation in the Bayou City, 1990–2000," stated that Hispanics and Latinos had "intermediate levels of segregation" from non-Hispanic whites.

As of 2006 Karl Eschbach, a University of Texas Medical Branch demographer, said that the number of illegal (undocumented) immigrants in the Houston area was estimated at 400,000.

== History ==
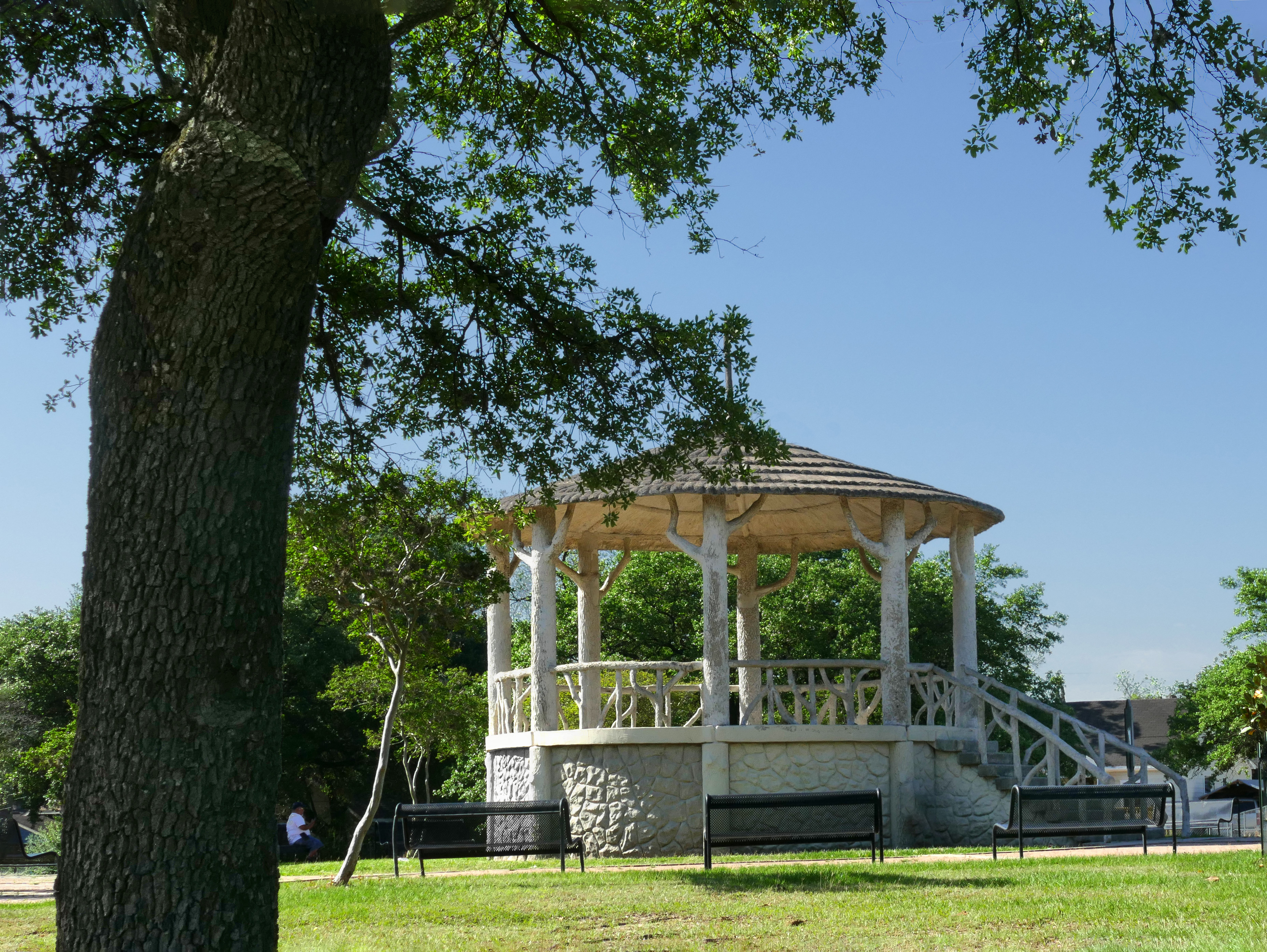
Hidalgo Park Quiosco

In the early 1980s, there were 300,000 native Hispanics, and an estimated 80,000 illegal immigrants from Mexico in Houston. In 1985, Harris County had about 500,000 Hispanics.

In 1990, there were 192,220 foreign-born Hispanic residents of Houston, with 132,596, or 69%, being Mexican immigrants. 39,289 were from Central America, 12,250 were from South America, and 8,085 were from Caribbean nations. The 1990 U.S. Census said that, of the adult Houstonians who use bicycles to get to work, 32% are Hispanic. In 1997, Hispanic men tended to use bicycles more than did women. Due to Latin American social customs, Hispanic women tended to walk, or use public buses when traveling for goods or work; otherwise they stayed at home.

In 1995 about 100,000 immigrants from Central America resided in Houston. As of 2001, Hispanics were almost 38% of Houston's population and 8% of the city's voting electorate.

== Economy ==
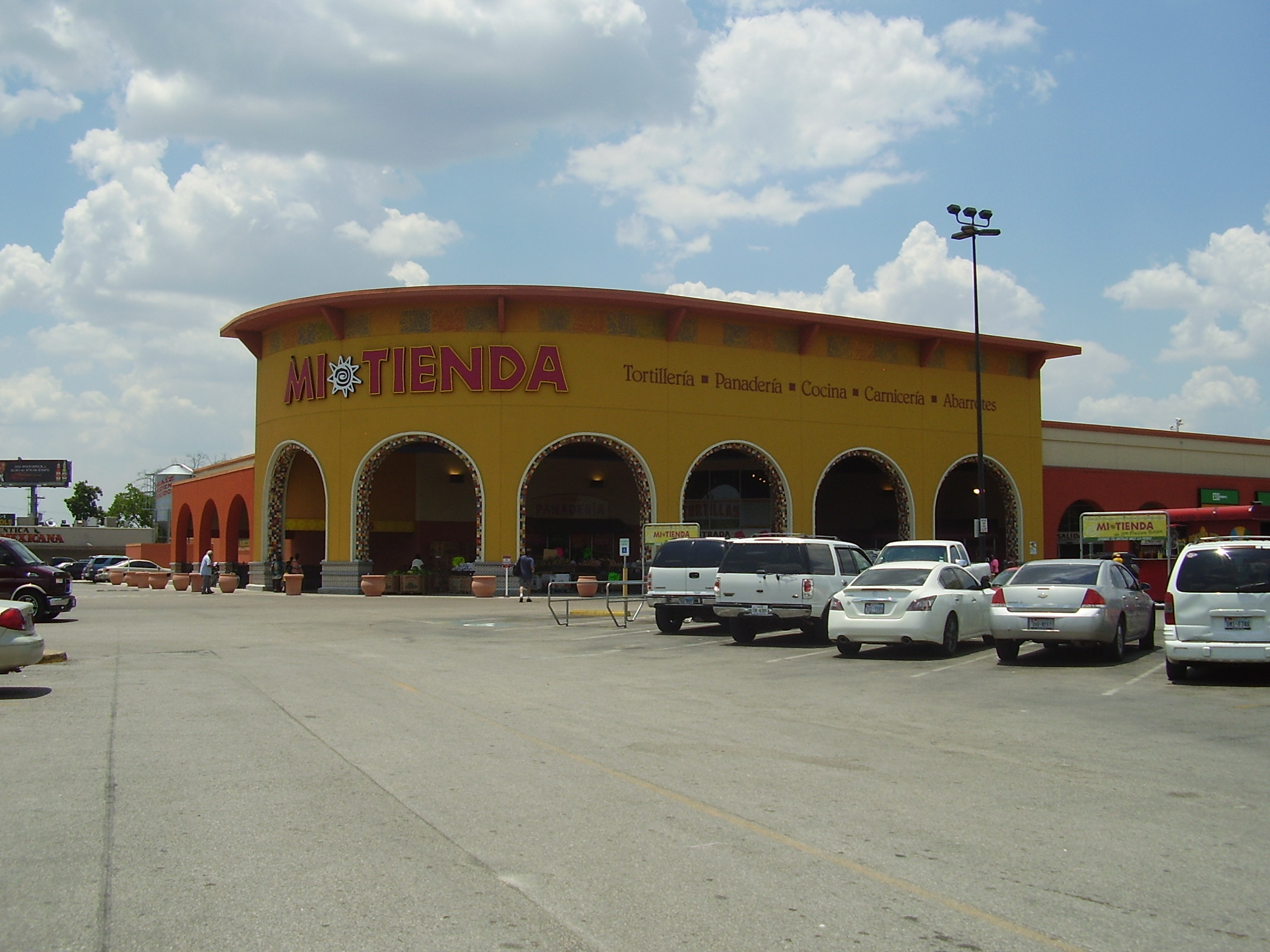
H-E-B Mi Tienda ("My Store") in northern Houston

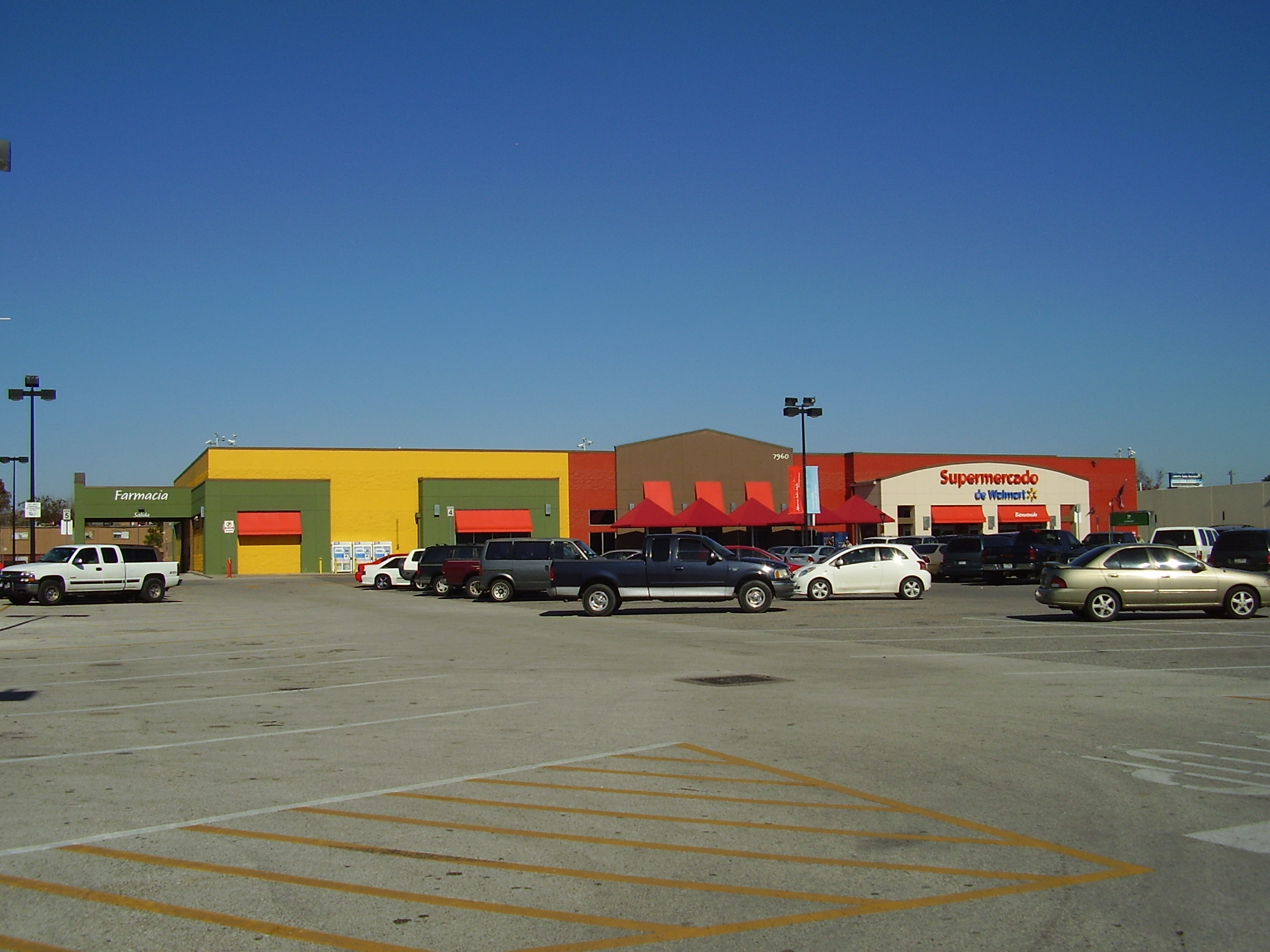
The Supermercado de Walmart store in the Spring Branch area was designed to accommodate Hispanic customers; it opened in 2009 and closed in 2014

In 1991, most Hispanic-owned businesses in Greater Houston were in industries with lower profit margins, such as construction, distribution, and services. The largest Hispanic-owned business was RioStar Corp., which operated Ninfa's. The business generating the highest number of sales was Solvents & Chemicals and Packaging Services of Pearland, Texas.

Fiesta Mart was established in 1972 by two non-Hispanic white men; one of them, Donald Bonham, wished to create a store serving Hispanic and Latino customers. Allison Wollam of the Houston Business Journal said "The company has been successful at targeting the Hispanic market and specifically catering to their needs and shopping styles." Bernie Murphy, a spokesperson for Fiesta, said in 2006 that at some stores Hispanics make up to 70% of those stores's clientele. For a period it was the sole major chain catering to Hispanics and Latinos. By 2015 Fiesta experienced serious competition as other chains began targeting Hispanics and Latinos.

In 2003 Kroger converted its Gulfton location into a Hispanic-themed supermarket. In December 2010 Kroger announced that the Gulfton Kroger would close by the end of January, as it has been an under-performing store. Kroger owned the store location, and the chain was considering selling it to another grocery chain.

In 2006 H-E-B opened the "Mi Tienda" ("My Store") Hispanic-themed store in the City of South Houston, near Pasadena. As of 2007 all of its employees spoke Spanish. Another Mi Tienda opened in north Houston in 2011; it is twice the size of the original location, and has 97,000 square feet (9,000 m^{2}) of space. H-E-B-owned Joe V's Smart Shop also targets Hispanic and Latino consumers.

In April 2009 Wal-Mart opened the 39,000-square-foot (3,600 m^{2}) "Supermercado de Walmart," a store designed to appeal to Hispanic customers, in Spring Branch. Converted from a Wal-Mart Neighborhood Market, it was the first "Supermercado de Walmart" opened by the company in the United States. June 2009 Wal-Mart was scheduled to open Más Club, a version of Sam's Club catering to Hispanics and Latinos. Más Club closed in January 2014. Supermercado de Wal-Mart closed in December 2014.

As of 2015 several Aldi locations in Houston cater to Hispanic and Latino customers.

== Culture ==
Tex- Mex cuisine, a fusion of Mexican and American flavors, has deep roots in Houston’s Hispanic community. The city is credited with popularizing dishes such as fajitas, which were introduced by Maria Ninfa Rodriguez Laurenzo, the founder of Ninfa's Restaurant.

One of the largest annual festivals In Houston Is Fiestas Patrias, a celebration of Mexican Independence day that attracts thousands of people each year. It is organized by the Fiestas Patrias Houston, a local organization that Is dedicated to Mexican culture and traditions. The festival Is known to feature live music, traditional Mexican dancing, and a parade that goes through downtown Houston.

== Geography ==
Eschbach said that, historically, Hispanics resided in specific neighborhoods of Houston, such as Denver Harbor, the Houston Heights, Magnolia Park, and the Northside.

From the 1980 census to the 1990 census, there were large swathes of Hispanic growth in Houston; in most areas the Hispanics were of Mexican descent, while in Gulfton and Spring Branch of Spring Branch they were of Central American origins. Hispanics moved into sections of north Houston, Spring Branch, and Sharpstown by an amount between 1,000 and 3,500 per square mile, and Hispanics moved into Gulfton by more than 3,500 Hispanics per square mile. From the same period Hispanics began to move into a portion of the southeast metropolitan area, including sections of Pasadena and the City of South Houston by an amount between 1,000 and 3,500 per square mile.

Between 1985 and 2005, the county's Hispanic population tripled, with Hispanics making up about 40% of the county's residents. In most communities inside and outside Beltway 8, Hispanics became the predominant ethnic group. Some communities in Greater Houston which do not have Hispanics as the predominant ethnic group include expensive, predominately non-Hispanic white communities such as Memorial, Uptown, and West University Place; and historically African American neighborhoods located south and northeast of Downtown Houston. Eschbach said, "But even these core black and white neighborhoods are experiencing Hispanic inroads. Today, Hispanics live everywhere."

In a period before 2005, many Hispanic and Latino Americans had moved into traditionally African-American neighborhoods. Between 1990 and 2000, the numbers of Hispanic and Latino Americans in Kashmere Gardens, South Park, Sunnyside, and the Third Ward increased. After Hurricane Katrina hit New Orleans in 2005, many ethnic Hondurans from that city moved to Houston.

The Hispanic and Latino population's percentage of the overall population of Texas City had increased to 29.9% in 2017 from 27% in 2010, and by then the city had a Hispanic supermarket and other businesses catering to Hispanics.

== Politics ==
As of 2001, Hispanics were almost 38% of Houston's population and 8% of the city's voting electorate. As of the same year, most Hispanic and Latino candidates elected to public office in Houston are Mexican Americans, who are members of the Democratic Party. Most Hispanics and Latinos in public office are politically liberal. Lori Rodriguez of the Houston Chronicle said in 2001 that "the top tier of Latino politicos mainly walk in lock step." According to Richard Murray, a political scientist of the Center for Public Policy of Rice University, the Hispanic middle class of 2001 was larger than in previous years, and Hispanic voters lived in every Houston voting precinct, including River Oaks and Tanglewood.

In 2007 most of the Hispanic and Latino political power was Mexican American, aligned with the Democratic Party, and made up of residents of eastern Houston. But many of the most vocal leaders who participated in immigration rallies were Hispanics of Central American origin who resided mostly in Southwest Houston.

In 2001 Orlando Sanchez made a bid to become Mayor of Houston. Lori Rodriguez of the Houston Chronicle said that this was the first well-funded and focused campaign for Houston mayor by a Hispanic candidate. Sanchez, a Cuban American, was a member of the Republican Party and politically conservative.

By 2011 the new city council District J was organized to reflect changing demographics and better represent Hispanics in Houston. Robert Jara, a political consultant of the group Campaign Strategies, drew the boundaries of District J in order to ensure that heavily Hispanic Gulfton and Sharpstown were together in one area. That way, the Hispanic residents could lobby for influence with their city council representative, whether he or she is of Hispanic origin or not. In a May 2011 editorial the Houston Chronicle editors said that they supported the District J redistricting plan since they believed that Hispanics need more representation, but they added that the election of a Hispanic to fill the position is not guaranteed because many of the residents are not U.S. citizens and are ineligible to vote. As an example, the editors pointed to the Texas State Legislature's establishment of the 29th congressional district so that a Hispanic/Latino could be elected as a member of the United States Congress. Gene Green, a non-Hispanic White, won the first election for the district in 1992. As of 2011 Green was still the incumbent in the area.

== Religion ==
=== Christianity ===
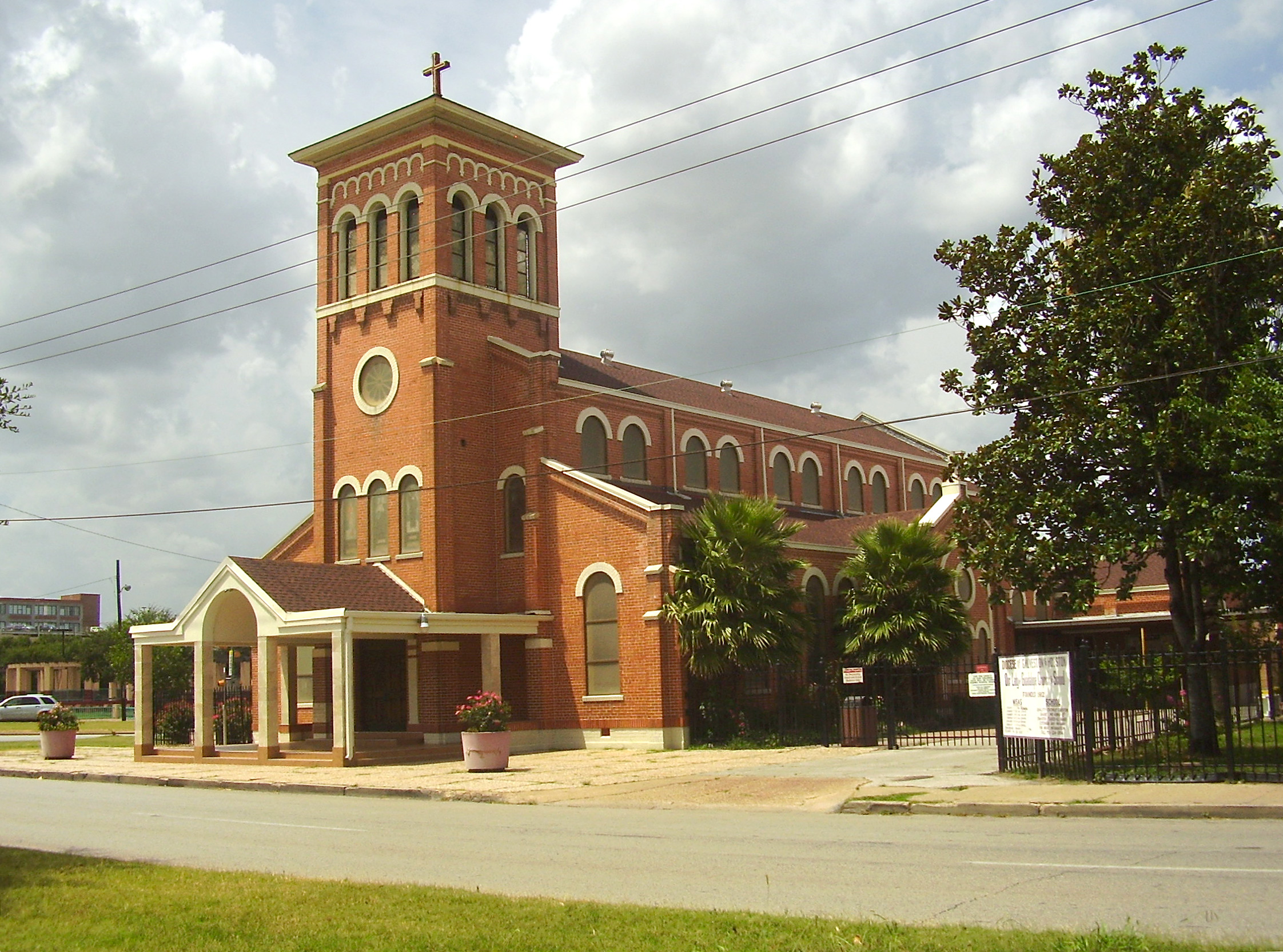
Our Lady of Guadalupe Catholic Church in the Second Ward

As of 2011 the Roman Catholic Archdiocese of Galveston-Houston had 89 churches that offered Spanish-language services, with worship services tailored to serve Spanish speakers. The city's first Mexican-American church was Our Lady of Guadalupe Catholic Church, which opened in 1911.

Several Protestant and Evangelical churches also have Spanish-speaking congregations. South Main Baptist Church began offering Spanish language services circa 1975, and by 2005 its Spanish ministry had almost 100 members.

By 2005 the non-denominational Lakewood Church offered Spanish-language services.

Sarah Cortez published a memoir titled Walking Home: Growing Up Hispanic in Houston which discusses her religious faith.

St. Faustina Catholic Church in Fulshear, popular with Greater Katy's Venezuelan population and one of the churches with Spanish services, is in proximity to Cinco Ranch. It previously held its services at Joe Hubenak Elementary School, but in 2017 it moved into its own 1,600-seat building.

=== Islam ===
Around 2002 some Hispanics in Houston became converts to Islam. They said that, since their conversions, many people mistake them as being of Pakistani or Middle Eastern origin. The area's first Spanish-speaking mosque, the Centro Islámico, opened on January 30, 2016. It was the first Spanish-language mosque to open in the United States since the 2005 closure of the storefront mosque of the Alianza Islámica in New York City. The Houston mosque, decorated in a manner similar to that of the Mezquita de Córdoba, is operated by the organization IslamInSpanish.

== Media ==
The Houston Chronicle has a Spanish-language weekly edition, La Voz de Houston.

El Rumbo was previously published in Houston.

El Día was previously published in Houston. There is a classifieds paper called La Subasta that is published by the same company, and is still published.

The first radio station with a Spanish-language broadcast was KLVL.

In 1994 Alex Mejia created a salsa and merengue station called Radio Kafe. He later became a reverend and started Radio Luz ("Radio Light"), which had its studio in Southwest Houston.

== Ethnic groups ==
=== Mexicans ===
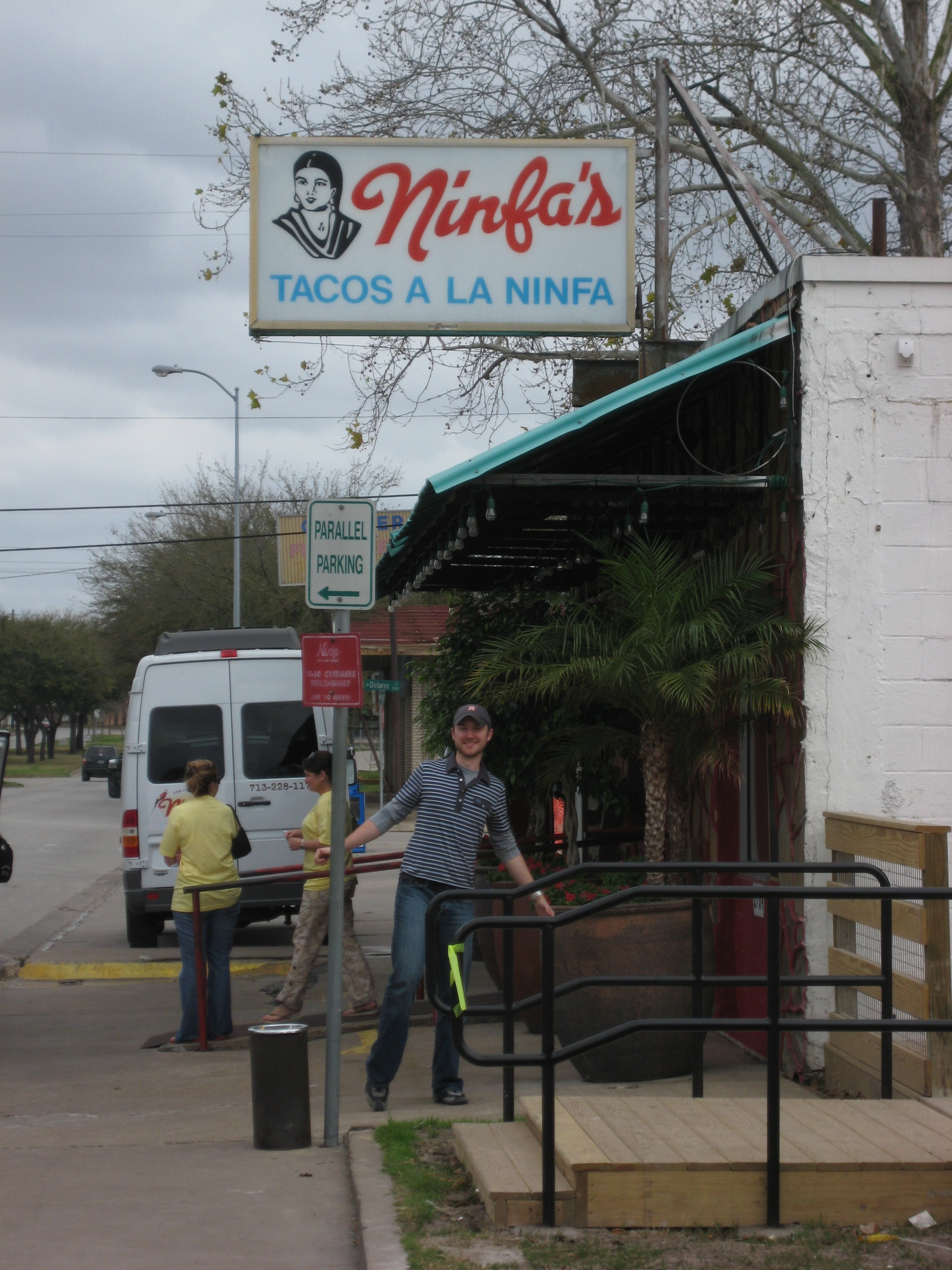
Original Ninfa's on Navigation Boulevard, established by Ninfa Laurenzo

When Houston was first settled in 1837 by Anglo White Americans, this area of East Texas had relatively few Mexican Americans. Areas of West Texas and the Southwest had much higher numbers of Mexican Americans, including many whose ancestors had deep ties to the region, long before the United States annexed the area following the Mexican–American War. Mexican migration into Houston increased in the late 19th century with the expansion of the railroad system and following social disruption due to Porfirio Díaz becoming President of Mexico.

In the early 20th century the population further increased, due to refugees fleeing the disruption of the 1910 Mexican Revolution, laborers recruited to the city by enganchadores (labor agents), higher unemployment in rural areas, and a labor shortage during World War I. Into the 1920s, because of labor demand in Houston and the United States, immigration restrictions against Mexicans were few.

In the 1989 book Ethnicity in the Sunbelt: A History of Mexican Americans in Houston, author Arnoldo De León described the relationship between Houston's Mexican Americans and newly arrived immigrants from Mexico. De León said that the historic residents feared that they were being adversely affected by poor opinions about the new immigrants, many of whom were assumed to be illegal immigrants, few of whom spoke English and many of whom were from rural areas with limited job skills to apply to city life. At the same time, the new immigrants kept the entire community in touch with the Mexican culture of the homeland.

=== Central Americans ===
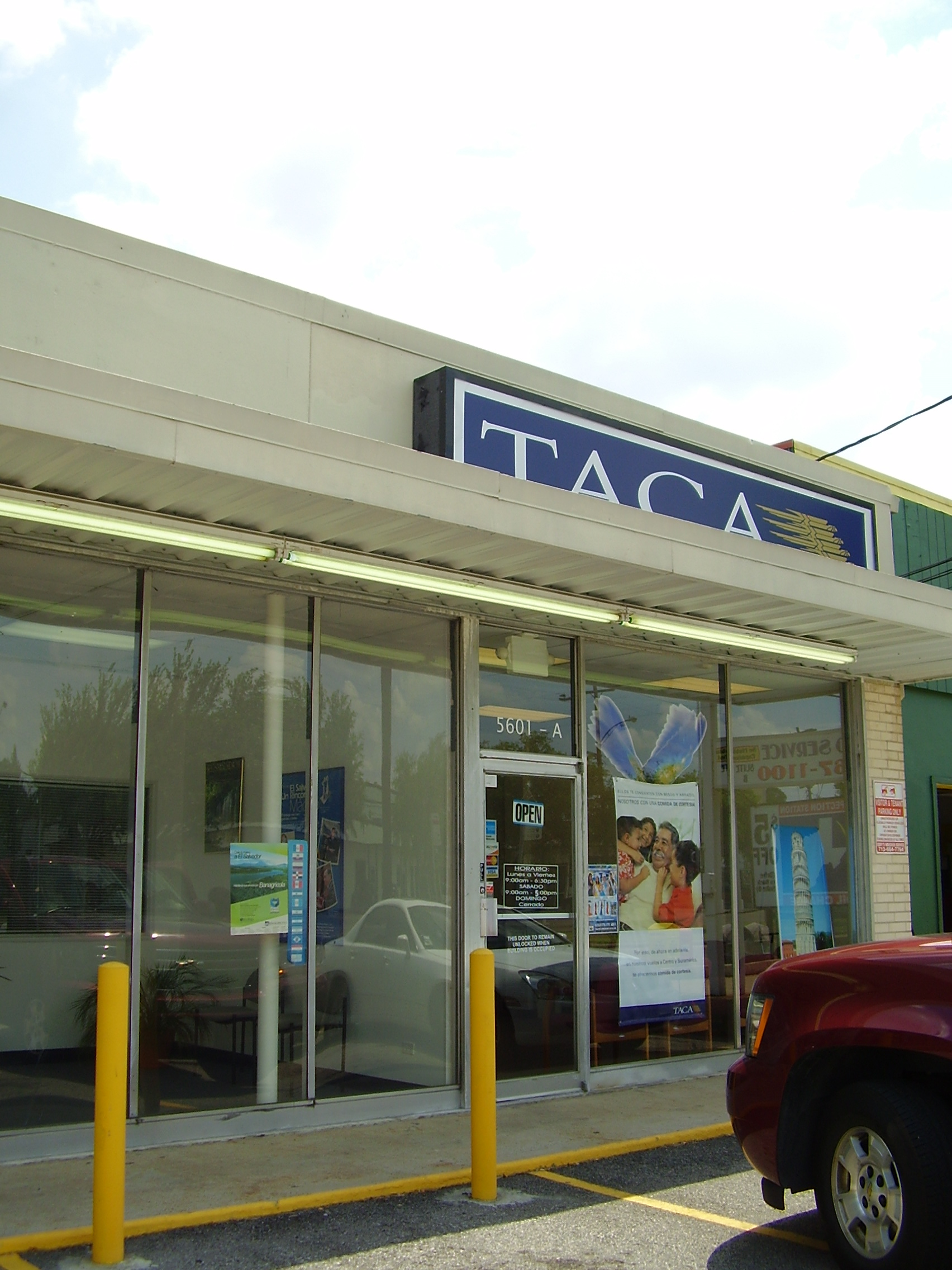
Houston office of TACA Airlines in Gulfton

In 1990, there were 39,289 immigrants from Central America in Houston. At that time Southwest Houston developed infrastructure that catered to Central Americans. The combined Central American population is close to about 4% of Houston's population, particularly from the northern portion of Central America like Salvadoran and Guatemalan communities.

=== Cubans ===
Since the mid-1990s changes in immigration from Cuba to the United States occurred due to the wet feet, dry feet policy and other policy changes; many Cubans immigrated through Mexico and people who did not have relatives in Miami settled in Houston; this caused an expansion of Houston's Cuban American community. In 2013 Peter Stranges, the supervisor of refugee services of the Catholic Charities of the Archdiocese of Galveston-Houston said that often Cuban refugees arrive with no possessions other than immigration documents and the clothes they are wearing.

From May 2012 to February 17, 2013, counselors at the refugee services office of the Galveston-Houston Catholic charities assisted 450 Cuban immigrants coming to the Houston area. Stranges said "We used to see two or three Cubans a week, and we've started seeing groups of 25 or 30 at a time and there were weeks when we have 60 border crossers coming to our offices. It's unprecedented. What's challenging is we don't want to turn down anyone who comes to our doors, so we've really scrambled to come up with a team to handle this surge."

The American Community Survey from the US Census Bureau reported that there were approximately 25 250 Cubans living in Houston-The Woodlands-Sugar Land Metropolitan Statistical Area in 2013. The five Houston agencies providing resettlement services for newcomers assisted almost 4,500 Cubans refugees in fiscal year 2014 and until March 2015 the agencies had served 3,022 refugees.

During the first 10 months of fiscal year 2016, 46,635 Cubans have entered the U.S. via ports of entry – already surpassing full fiscal year 2015's total of 43,159, according to U.S. Customs and Border Protection data obtained through a public records request. Fiscal 2015 was a surge year and was up 78% over 2014, when 24,278 Cubans entered the U.S. And those 2014 numbers had already increased dramatically after the Cuban government lifted travel restrictions that year. These totals are significantly higher than in all of fiscal 2011, when 7,759 Cubans came into the U.S.

According to five agencies which resettle refugees in Houston, in the fiscal year 2022 about 6,000 Cubans who crossed the US-Mexico border went to the Houston area.

=== Venezuelans ===
According to the 2000 U.S. census there were 1,592 persons of Venezuelan origins in the Houston area. By 2004 many Venezuelans fleeing the economic changes by the Hugo Chávez government settled in the Houston area due to the presence of the oil industry. That year Wladimir Torres, the publisher of El Venezolano de Houston, a monthly Venezuelan American publication, stated that at that time there were over 10,000 persons of Venezuelan origin in the Houston area. Around that time Citgo was moving its U.S. headquarters to Houston, potentially causing another increase of the Venezuelan population. As of 2017 there were about 11,000 people of Venezuelan origins in Greater Houston; almost 50% of them lived in Greater Katy.

Venezuelans traveled by airplane and arrived with their life savings, allowing them to buy houses in the $80,000-$190,000 ($136363.64-323863.64 according to inflation) range. Venezuelans specifically chose to move to Greater Katy due to the Katy Independent School District's reputation and the proximity to their workplaces in west Houston, especially in the Energy Corridor. As a result, the Katy area received the nickname "Katyzuela". In regards to the nickname, Sebastian Herrera of the Houston Chronicle wrote "no one seems quite sure who to credit". In particular, as of 2012 Venezuelans are concentrated in Cinco Ranch. As of 2015 two restaurants, Budare Arepa Express and Delis Café, according to Florian Martin of Houston Public Media, "could be considered the social centers of the Venezuelan community in Katy. " By 2016 real estate agents began using the "Katyzuela" moniker. By 2023, multiple Venezuelan restaurants were established in the Katy area.

As of 2004 most Houston Venezuelans had anti-Chávez political stances. Some, including employees of Citgo, which was developing Venezuelan oil, favored Chávez. After Chávez died in 2013, members of the Venezuelan community expressed different opinions about him. The downturn of the Venezuelan economy after Chavez's death stimulated more emigration to the United States for family survival.

St. Faustina Catholic Church in Fulshear has a Spanish worship service that attracts Venezuelan people. Naida Givvon established a Venezuelan cultural festival in 2011; it is held every year at the Southwest Equestrian Center.

Beginning in 2011, the Katy Equestrian Center began having the "Viva Venezuela" festival, with 12,000 to 15,000 people going each year.

=== Other South Americans ===
In 2006 there were 23,317 persons of Colombian origins in Harris County, making them one of the largest South American groups there. The Colombian Fest, which celebrates the Colombian independence day, is held annually.

Many Colombians in Houston favored prosecuting Joe Horn, who fatally shot two Colombian illegal immigrants stealing from his house in 2007.

The Asociacion Peruana de Houston is the Peruvian-American association in the city. It engages in charity work in the United States and Peru, as well as holding celebrations for Peruvian Independence Day. Juan Alfonso Verastegui and some other Peruvians co-founded the organization in 1976.

== Notable residents ==
This lists excludes people of only Mexican heritage, as they are listed in Mexican Americans in Houston, or of only Central American heritage, as they are at Central Americans in Houston

- Art Acevedo, Cuban American, former Houston Police Department chief
- Ted Cruz, Cuban American, U.S. Senator
- Lina Hidalgo, Colombian American, Harris County county judge
