= Hispanics and Latinos in Texas =

Ethnic group

Hispanic and Latino Texans are residents of the state of Texas who are of Hispanic or Latino ancestry. As of the 2020 U.S. census, Hispanics and Latinos of any race were 39.3% of the state's population. Moreover, the U.S. Census shows that the 2010 estimated Hispanic population in Texas was 9.7 million and increased to 11.4 million in 2020 with a 2,064,657 population jump from the 2010 Latino population estimate.

In 2022, Hispanics and Latinos of any race overtook the non-Hispanic white population as the state's largest demographic.

== History ==
=== Origins ===
The first European to see Texas was Alonso Álvarez de Pineda, who led an expedition for the governor of Jamaica, Francisco de Garay, in 1520. While searching for a passage between the Gulf of Mexico and Asia, Álvarez de Pineda created the first map of the northern Gulf Coast, which solidified Spain's claim over this territory. This map is the earliest recorded document of Texas history.

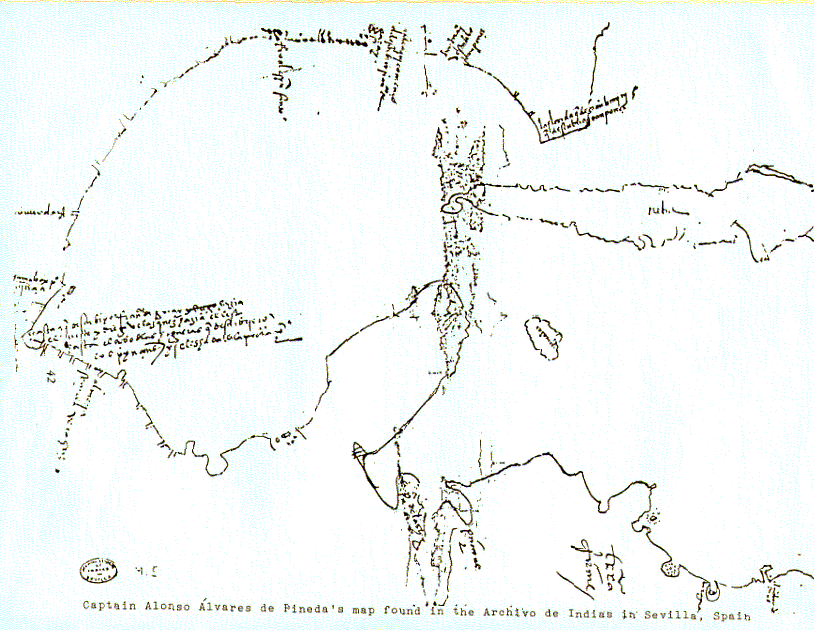
The first map of the Gulf of Mexico drawn during the expedition led by Alonso Alvarez de Pineda in 1519 that depicts the coast of Texas for the first time.

Years later on June 1527, an expedition led by Pánfilo de Narváez and Álvar Núñez Cabeza de Vaca with the purpose of reaching Florida in order to build a city, resulted in a failed mission due to harsh weather and disease. Instead, the Spanish explorers were left shipwrecked off the coast of Texas where the Spanish lived for around six years. After the years spent living in Texas among Indigenous civilization, Narvaez and Cabeza de Baca along with some of their men, found their way back to Mexico City in 1536 and told stories about the extravagancies witnessed in the north. Learning about this, the Spanish set out due north in 1539 with the purpose of discovering riches in places yet to be explored. One of the primary motives for the excursions was for the discovery of gold.

The excursion of the Spanish in 1539 into the north or what is today Texas, New Mexico, and Arizona, was led by the Spanish conquistador Francisco Vázquez de Coronado. On July 7, 1540, Coronado's army reached the outskirts of the rumored city of much gold, Cibola, near upper Rio Grande where the Spanish encountered massive resistance from Puebloans. The violence between the Spanish and the Puebloans continued at Cibola until the Puebloan soldiers inhabiting Cibola were forced to leave to a village where their wives and children had moved to for shelter.

When the fighting settled, Coronado decided to explore the land more extendedly, which was when one of the expeditions arrived at Texas in 1541 where they encountered groups of people from the Caddo tribe, leading to more events of violence. After all, Coronado returned to New Spain on April 1542 an informed about the cruel reality of the cities in the north that were explored, describing them as not having any gold or silver. Soon after this, the Spanish decided to remain away from the north or the present day southwest region of the United States for approximately 150 years, though expeditions led by Spaniards and not authorized by Spain did take place within those years. Until 1688, Spain essentially remained out of Texas.

Around 1688, the Spanish learned about French interventions occurring in the area of Texas, land that had already been claimed by Spain. This led to the actions taken by Spaniard Alonso de León, the then governor of Coahuila, to march into Texas towards Fort St. Louis. Fort St. Louis was the location where the French were set up. In April 1689, Alonso de Leon arrived with his army ready to take down the French fort and looking for any remaining French in the area. During the time there, de Leon was informed by some of the located French that the Karankawa people had attacked them and left the fort in ruins, forcing the French to flee. A year after going back to New Spain, de Leon returned to Texas because he was concerned about the French returning to Spanish territory. Spanish activity in Texas remained minimal and only returned when the French attempted to intervene.

In 1690 when de Leon returned to Texas, he had with him an army of about 100 men made up of soldiers and priests and built the first church in Texas, named San Francisco de los Tejas. The construction of this church was a major stepping stone for Spain as Spanish Texas was headed to become an area of greater importance for Spain. After San Francisco de los Tejas was established, the construction of many more missions followed, such as Mision Nuestra Senora del Rosario and Nuestra Senora del Refugio. A year later in January 1691, Domingo Terán de los Ríos was appointed to be the governor of Spanish Texas. Throughout the construction of various churches, the Spanish had interactions with different Indigenous groups. Soon enough, interracial marriages led to the development of different races such as mestizos, criollos, and culebras/mulattos. This led to the development of the Caste system in Texas and throughout the southwest United States. During this time, Spain faced problems with the French, the Natives, and with also with each other. With years passing by, the occurrence of other events such as the American Revolution in 1775, led to more problems in Texas. Soon enough, Spain would have to face the ever-growing United States and the Mexican population while having problems with the Natives and the French.

Mexico declared its independence from Spain on September 16, 1810, and war ended on September 26, 1821. Because of Mexico's independence from Spain, Texas became the property of Mexico. Around this time, the United States had obtained massive amounts of land from France through the Louisiana Purchase in 1803. In addition, under Mexican law, Texas was available for anyone to move to and also offered land grants to empresarios. During this time, the population of Texas grew quickly. The population was not only Mexican but also included United States citizens, Native Americans and enslaved people. When people residing in Texas did not agree with Mexican law and did not follow the law, Mexico ended all immigration into Texas. Such events led to the Texas Independence which then led to the annexation of Texas and then to the Mexican–American War.

On February 2, 1848, the peace treaty, the Treaty of Guadalupe Hidalgo, was signed between Mexico and the United States which essentially gave the United States much of the land that was owned by Mexico in the north and established the Rio Grande River as the border between Texas and Mexico. Moreover, Hispanics and Latinos already living in the territory that became of the United States, were given the opportunity to stay and obtain United States citizenship. While many chose to leave to their home country, many also decided to stay.

=== Recent immigration ===
The major immigration of Mexicans into Texas began during the 1890s due to the growth and Industrialisation aspect of Texas that created a plethora of jobs.

Mexicans in Texas declined from around 20% of the population in 1830, to 10% in 1840 and 6% by 1860. Mexicans reached a low of 4% in Texas in 1887, however the share started to rise again in the 1890s and 1900s. By 1930, Mexicans had re-reached that of 12% and comprised an overwhelming majority in the border counties.

As of 2025 45.1% of immigrants were Mexicans specifically, who migrate for economic opportunities, increased quality of life, and safety. In recent studies it is shown that Hispanic immigrants in recent years are more educated than those in the past. From the years 2022-2024 58% of Hispanic immigrants have at least an associate degree which is 20% more than the amount in the prior ten years.

== Demographics ==
Hispanics (of any race) were 7.1% of the state population in 1910. As of 2010, 45% of Texas residents had Hispanic ancestry; these include recent immigrants from Mexico, Central America, and South America, as well as Tejanos, whose ancestors have lived in Texas as early as the 1700s. Tejanos are the largest ancestry group in southern Duval County and among the largest in and around Bexar County, including San Antonio, where over one million Hispanics live. The state has the second largest Hispanic population in the United States, behind California.

Across southern, south-central, and western Texas as well as major urban centers like Austin, Dallas, Houston, and San Antonio, Hispanics make up a significant share of the population. Because their birth rates have been higher than those of non-Hispanic whites since the early 1990s, Texas has maintained a younger population than the U.S. overall. As of 2007, more than half of all births in the state were to Hispanic parents(50.2%), while non-Hispanic white births made up only about 34%.

Steve Murdock, a demographer with the Hobby Center for the Study of Texas at Rice University and a former director of the U.S. Census Bureau, predicted that, between 2000 and 2040 (assuming that the net migration rate will equal half that of 1990–2000), Hispanic public school enrollment will increase by 213 percent, while non-Hispanic white enrollment will decrease by 15 percent. As of 2010, 29.21% (6,543,702) of Texas residents age 5 and older spoke Spanish at home as a primary language.

=== Ancestries ===
(self-identified ethnicity, not by birthplace)
Ancestry by origin (2020-2022 Census)	Population	%
Argentine	19,696	
Bolivian	6,926	
Chilean	14,149	
Colombian	104,755	
Costa Rican	12,961	
Cuban	129,482	
Dominican	38,063	
Ecuadorian	30,411	
Guatemalan	151,112	
Honduran	242,067	
Mexican	9,674,825	
Nicaraguan	38,344	
Panamanian	22,621	
Paraguayan	2,726	
Peruvian	37,277	
Puerto Rican	264,937	
Salvadoran	405,687	
"Spanish"	90,033	
"Spaniard"	130,833	
"Spanish American"	2,128	
Uruguayan	3,453	
Venezuelan	122,038	
All other	520,494	
Total	12,070,642	

Ancestry by region	Number	%
Mexican	7,951,193	31.6%
Caribbean	190,470	0.8%
Central American	420,683	1.7%
South American	133,808	0.5%
Other Hispanic	764,767	3.0%
Total		

== Spanish language in Texas ==
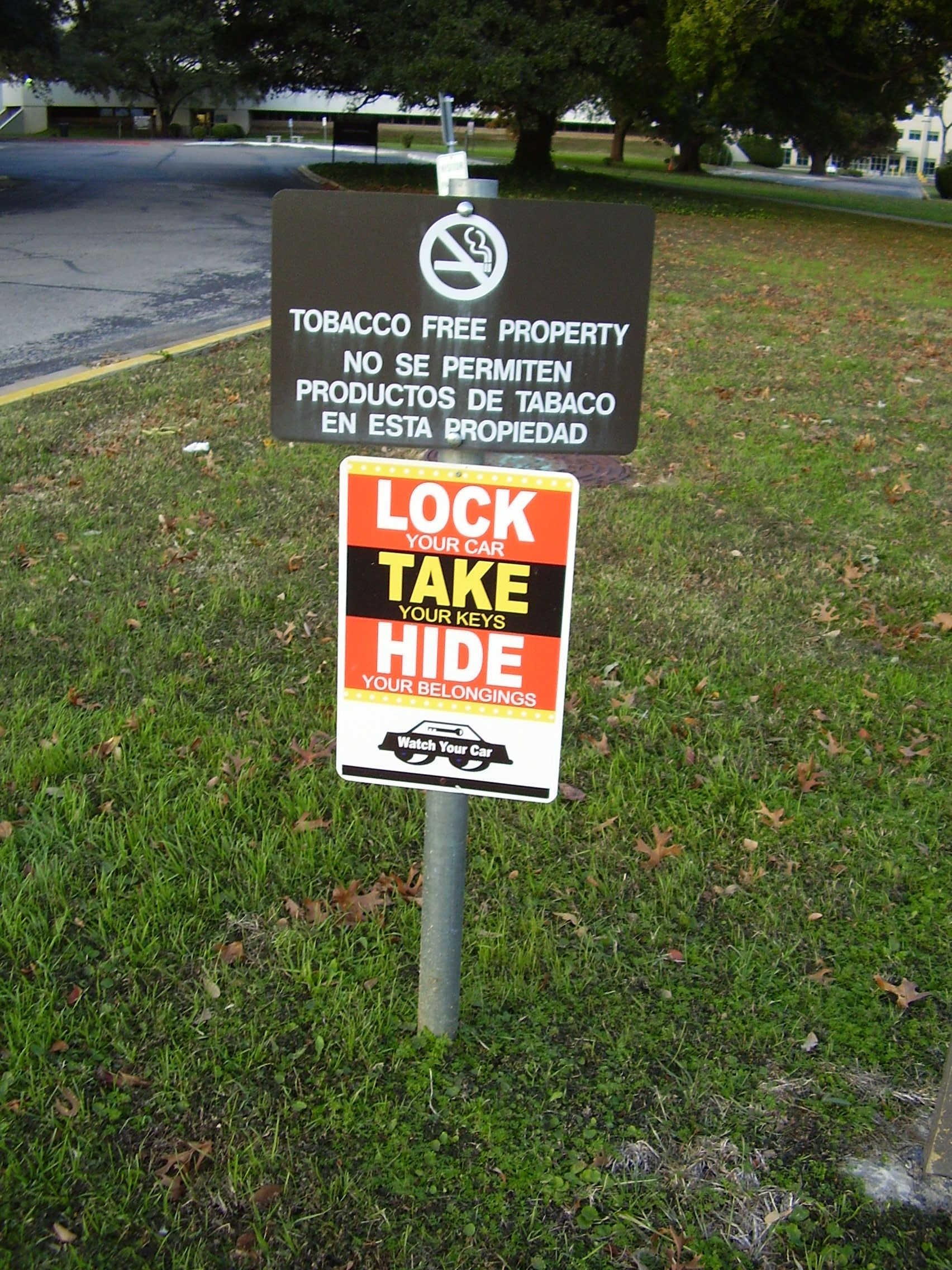
"No Smoking" sign in Spanish and English at the headquarters of the Texas Department of State Health Services in Austin, Texas

In Texas, English is the state's de facto official language (though it lacks de jure status) and is used in government. However, the continual influx of Spanish-speaking immigrants increased the import of Spanish in Texas. Texas's counties bordering Mexico are mostly Hispanic, and consequently, Spanish is commonly spoken in the region. The Government of Texas, through Section 2054.116 of the Government Code, mandates that state agencies provide information on their websites in Spanish to assist residents who have limited English proficiency.

== Ethnic conflicts ==
=== Origins ===
A map of the United States and Mexico at the rise of the Mexican American war.

From 1915 to 1919, during the Mexican Revolution, Mexicans and Tejanos in South Texas faced increased violence from Texan Rangers. Due to tensions caused by changes in both governments and the border, people of Latino descent were hanged, shot, burnt, decapitated, and tortured. Texas Legislative Investigation ended this period of violence by finding the Texas Rangers guilty. More recently, the Texas government has acknowledged this period of history with the "Life and Death on the Border, 1910 to 1920" exhibit.

Anti-Latino attitudes spiked during the Great Depression of the 1930s. Latinos, among other foreigners, were accused of stealing jobs from Americans and contributing to the decline of the economy. In response to the growing, Anglo-American, frustration, the United States government forcibly removed 2 million Latinos with the majority of them being American citizens. During these repatriations, local governments denied aid to those of Mexican descent, offered train fares to Mexico and raided Latino communities. Hospitals removed Latinos with disabilities and illness while employers laid off Latino workers. To avoid raids and discrimination, many Latinos returned to Mexico voluntarily. By 1936, approximately one third of Texas's Latino population had been repatriated.

These sentiments heightened in the 1840s with the end of the Mexican-American War and the signing of the Treaty of Guadalupe Hidalgo. The increased population of Latinos were met with further illegal deportations, violence, racism, and segregation. In instance of these reactions was the Olivera Street raid of 1931. During this raid, law enforcement and immigration agents arrested and deported nearly 400 Mexican-Americans despite their citizenship or immigration status in America.

=== Mob violence ===
Anti-Latino sentiments grew during the California Gold Rush as many Latinos demonstrated more advanced mining skills than their white counterparts. From the late 19th century, the Gold Rush era, to the early 20th century, mob violence against Spanish-speaking individuals became a common occurrence and the number of victims reached well over thousands. During this period, Texas Rangers carried out lynchings of Hispanic men, women, and children for accusations that included cattle theft, murder, witchcraft, and even refusal to play the fiddle. Some case studies included the burning of Refugio Ramírez and his family for the alleged bewitching of neighbors in 1880 by a mob in Collin County, North Texas. Another event included the Porvenir Massacre of 1918, which involved the seizure and assassination of 15 men and boys from the village of Porvenir in Presidio County, Texas. Although Texas Rangers justified the murders by accusing the people of being "thieves, spies and murderers", the United States Army's and the State Department's investigations found that the denizens of Porvenir were unarmed and innocent. As a result, Texas state government began investigation of the Texas Rangers.

=== Environmental racism ===
With a high number of chemical industries and facilities, various neighborhoods within Houston are susceptible to toxic air pollution. The communities closest to these environmentally hazardous spaces are communities of low-income, people of color. Located in East Houston, Harrisburg/Manchester and Galena Park are the two communities with the closest proximity to Risk Management Plan (RMP) facilities or facilities that use certain hazardous substances.

Both Harrisburg/Manchester and Galena Park are largely made up of impoverished, Latino communities with average household incomes of $49,732 and $45,431. Due to the close proximity to RMP facilities, the people of these neighborhoods are at a 24 to 36 percent higher risk of getting cancer when compared to the predominantly white neighborhoods of Houston. Harrisburg/Manchester is geographically centered in the middle of "21 Toxic Release Inventory (TRI) reporting facilities, 11 large quantity generators of hazardous waste, 4 facilities that treat, store or dispose of hazardous waste, 9 major dischargers of air pollutants, and 8 major stormwater discharging facilities". An average of 484,000 pounds of toxic chemicals are released into the Harrisburg/Manchester air while none are released in communities with average household incomes of $226,333 and poverty rate of 3 percent.

=== School segregation ===
Spanning from the 1890s to the 1980s, 122 school districts throughout 59 counties established segregated schools for Mexican-Americans. These poorly developed schools lacked the adequate schooling environment. Teachers possessed no credentials or experience while the classrooms lacked the necessary equipment. School administrators often placed Tejano students into 'low-track' classes. By assessing Tejano students on biased rubrics that evaluated mental, emotional, and language abilities, school officials classified Tejano students as inferior and underdeveloped. Beginning with elementary schools, administrators assigned Tejano children to low-level and nonacademic courses, aimed to lead the students to vocational or general-education courses. Due to unequal educational platforms, disregard for Tejano culture, and linguistic intolerance, Hispanic students had higher withdrawal rates and lower academic performances.

Until 1970 Houston Independent School District (HISD) counted its Hispanic and Latino students as "white."

== Historic Hispanic/Latino population ==
=== Colonial and Mexican era ===
Total population of Spanish Texas, East of Santa Fe de Nuevo Mexico and North of Nuevo Santander prior to admission to U.S. statehood. These three regions formed today's Texas.

Population Statistics
Texas	Spaniards, Criollo, Mestizo	% pop
1682 (Coulson and Joyce estimates)	129 (Spanish settlers in Ysleta Mission, first Spanish foundation in modern-day Texas)	N/A
1731	500	N/A
1742 (Peter Gerhard estimations)	1,800	N/A
1755 (Coulson and Joyce estimates)	1,600	N/A
1761	1,200 (Spanish Texas)	N/A
1780	2,000 (Spanish Texas)	50%
1790 (Revillagigedo census)	2,409 (Spanish Texas)	73%
1800 (Juan Bautista Elguézabal census)	4,800 (Spanish Texas)	N/A
1810	5,000 (Spanish Texas)	N/A
1821	10,500: 2,500 (Spanish Texas) (Note: The Mexican War of Independence caused a loss of population throughout the country, including Texas.); 8,000 (El Paso) (Note: Spanish Texas consisted of East Texas and the part of Louisiana bordering Texas, where Los Adaes was located. West Texas belonged to Santa Fe de New Mexico, which included El Paso. In 1821, El Paso and the surrounding area had 8,000 Hispanics.)	10%
1830 (Coulson and Joyce estimates)	3,000 (Spanish Texas)	N/A

=== Independent and American Texas ===
Texas	Number of people of Mexican Origin (1850-1930) and of Hispanic/Latino Origin (1940-2020) in Texas^{[a]}	+% of Population of Mexican Origin (1850-1930) and of Hispanic/Latino Origin (1940-2020) in Texas
1840	7,000	10%
1845 (year of the U.S. annexation of Texas)	23,000	N/A
1850	14,000	N/A
1860	12,000	N/A
1870	N/A	N/A
1880	74,401	N/A
1890	N/A	N/A
1900	165,000 - 173,980	N/A
1910	276,654 - 280,975	7.1%
1920	461,659 - 472,616	9.9%
1930	732,106 - 803,810	13.8%
1940	736,433	11.5%
1950	1,025,588	13.3%
1960	1,417,792	14.8%
1970	1,981,861 (15% sample)	17.7%
1980	2 985 824	21.0%
1990	4 339 905	25.5%
2000	6,669,666	32.0%
2010	9,460,921	37.6%
2020	11,441,717	39.3%

== See also ==
- Tejano
- Isleños (Louisiana)
- Hispanos of New Mexico
- History of Mexican Americans in Texas
- History of Mexican Americans in Houston
- History of Mexican Americans in Dallas–Fort Worth
- History of Central Americans in Houston
- Hispanics and Latinos in Houston
