= West Main =

West Main may refer to:

- West Main District (Louisville), Kentucky
- West Main Elementary School, a public school in Lancaster, Texas

== See also ==
- North Main
- South Main (disambiguation)
