= El Día (Houston) =

El Día was a Spanish-language newspaper published in Houston, Texas by El Día, Inc. The company's offices are in Greater Sharpstown.

The newspaper, which began in 1982, focused on the Greater Houston Hispanic community, Mexico, Central America, and South America. Each newspaper had 56 pages. The newspaper had articles, celebrity coverage, comic strips, and locally written columns such as "Love Doctor." El Día's principal competitor was the newspaper Rumbo, which opened in late August 2004.

The newspaper closed in 2009. Carlos Munoz, a former reporter for the newspaper, said that the newspaper was too expensive to publish. KHOU-TV said that the end of the newspaper left "thousands of Spanish-speaking residents without a daily voice." The parent company of El Día, now La Subasta Inc., continues to publish La Subasta, a classified paper.

== See also ==
- List of Spanish-language newspapers published in the United States
- Hispanics and Latinos in Houston
