= Accion Newspaper =

Weekly newspaper in Atlanta, Georgia

Acción Newspaper
- Owner: Agustín Álvarez
- Editor: Agustín Álvarez
- Founded: January 14, 2004
- Language: Spanish
- Headquarters: Atlanta, GA
- Circulation: 15,000 Weekly
- Website: www.accionnewspaper.com

Acción Newspaper, also known as Acción Deportes, is a weekly newspaper that is published in Atlanta, Georgia, since January 14, 2004. It is one of the largest metropolitan newspapers in circulation in Atlanta since 2004 and is one of the most widely distributed newspaper in the area.

== Mission ==
Acción (Fuerza Informativa Hispana) is a newspaper publishing company. Acción Newspaper is distributed each Friday in the main shopping metropolitan areas of Atlanta. It is a free, rack-distributed tabloid newspaper focusing on sports.

The newspaper highlights the sports of the Hispanic community in Atlanta, Georgia and the metropolitan areas.

== History ==
Agustín Álvarez, the owner of Acción Newspaper, received a degree in journalism. He lived in Mexico before moving to Atlanta in 2000. In Mexico he worked in newspaper companies and radio stations in Ciudad Mante, Tamaulipas, Mexico. From 2000 to 2003, Álvarez worked as a sports freelance reporter at a sports-based Spanish weekly newspaper. He left in 2003 in order to begin his own Spanish-language sports-oriented newspaper.

== First Edition ==
On January 14, 2004, Álvarez released the first edition of what became known as Acción Newspaper. At first it was issued bi-weekly, due to its limited readership. However, it rapidly gained attention, with its 100-percent sports content, gleaned both from local activities and worldwide sports venues of interest to Spanish readers.

The newspaper covers sports stories from local soccer leagues to the Super Bowl. It has become known as "El Semanario de los Deportistas" due to its in-depth coverage in the local sports: soccer, baseball and basketball leagues.

In 2005 the newspaper began publishing weekly, on Thursdays. In 2011, Acción Newspaper began distributing their additions on Fridays instead of Thursdays.

== Distribution ==
Acción Newspaper is distributed in more than 30 metropolitan cities: Atlanta, Alphareta, Austell, Buford, Chamblee, College Park, Conyers, Cumming, Douglasville, Doraville, Duluth, East Point, Fayetteville, Forest Park, Flowery Branch, Gainesville, Hapeville, Jonesboro, Lawrenceville, Lilburn, Mableton, Marietta, Norcross, Oakwood, Riverdale, Roswell, Sandy Springs, Smyrna, Suwanee, Tucker and Union City.

== Newspaper editions ==
Acción Newspaper has had more than 440 issues since the newspaper began in 2004.
