= La Estrella Oeste =

Puerto Rican newspaper

- Type: Weekly newspaper
- Format: Tabloid
- Founded: 1983
- Language: Spanish
- Headquarters: Mayagüez, Puerto Rico
- Website: www.periodicolaestrella.com

La Estrella Oeste and La Estrella Norte were two Spanish-language, regional newspapers based in Mayagüez, Puerto Rico. Both editions covered 36 towns of the western and northern areas of Puerto Rico. The papers closed down in 2015.

In 2006, La Estrella was the biggest regional newspaper, in terms of circulation, in the Commonwealth of Puerto Rico, with a combined weekly circulation of 117,000. La Estrella was the first regional newspaper to be audited in Puerto Rico by the Circulation Verification Council (CVC). La Estrella was distributed door to door across the 36 towns of the western and northern regions of Puerto Rico.

The newspaper was founded in 1983, and was intended to cover news and features from Puerto Rico’s western towns. Later in the 1980s, La Estrella Norte was founded to cover news and features about Puerto Rico’s northern towns.
