= Acento Latino =

Newspaper in Fayetteville, North Carolina

- Type: free biweekly newspaper
- Format: tabloid
- Owner: Fayetteville Publishing Company
- Publisher: Charles Broadwell. (Paper's first publisher: Robert "Bubba" Dickson)
- Editor: Ed Panas. (Paper's first Managing Editor: Eléna Martina Askey)
- Founded: Created by Eléna Martina Askey and DicksonPress, Inc. in 1999. It was later sold to Fayetteville Publishing Company.
- Political alignment: neutral
- Language: Spanish
- Headquarters: 822 Whitefield Street, Fayetteville, North Carolina United States
- Website: Official website

Acento Latino is a biweekly newspaper based in Fayetteville, North Carolina for the Latino community.
