= El Vocero Hispano =

Weekly Spanish language newspaper in West Michigan

- Michigan's Hispanic Newspaper
- Type: Weekly newspaper
- Founder: Andres Abreu
- Founded: February 24, 1993; 33 years ago
- Language: Spanish
- City: Grand Rapids, Michigan
- Circulation: 5,000 (as of 2022)
- Website: elvocero.net

El Vocero Hispano is the largest Spanish language weekly newspaper in West Michigan that presents local and international news to its readers. The newspaper is edited by its founder, Andres Abreu.

== History ==
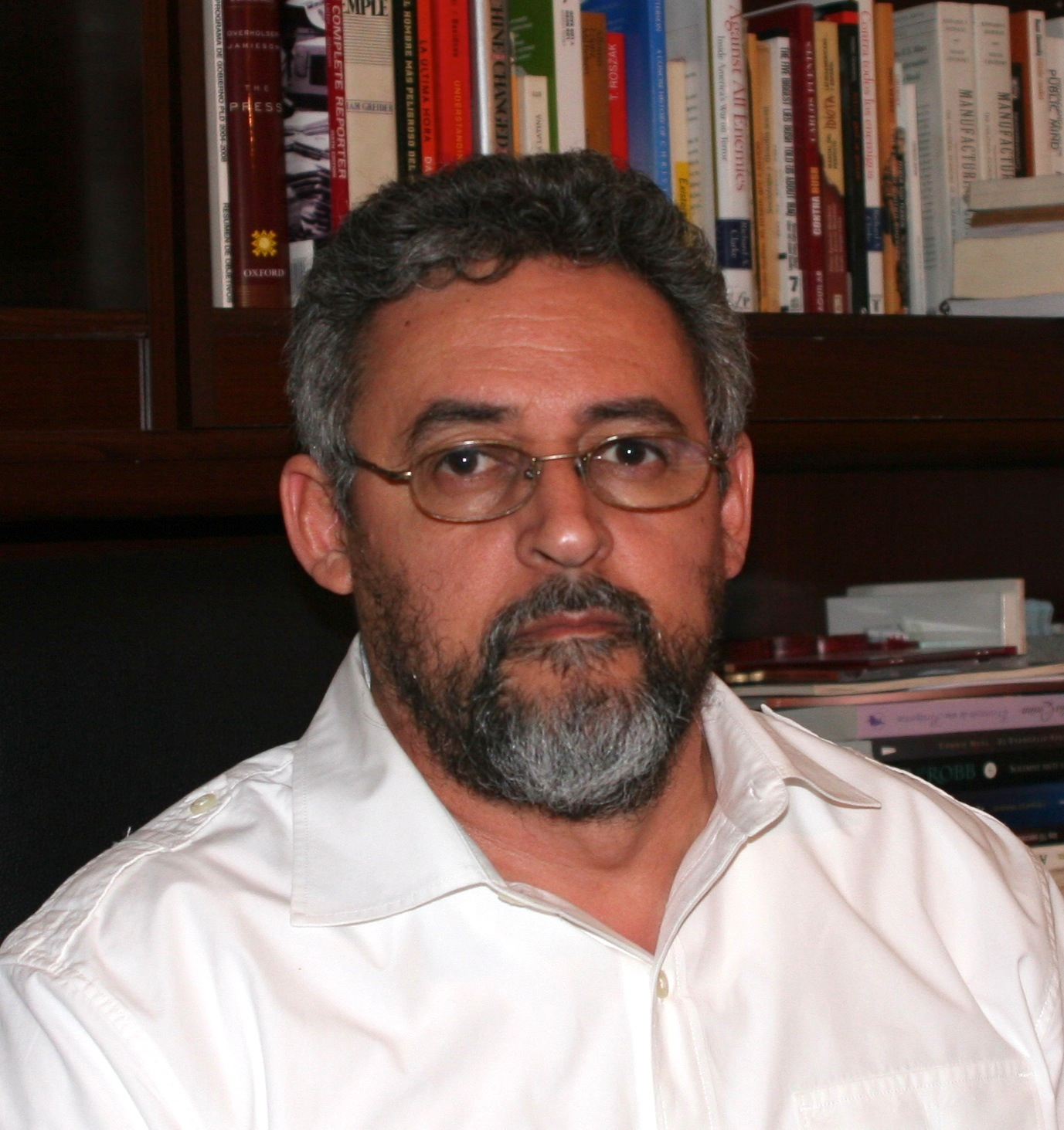
Andrés Abreu, founder of El Vocero Hispano

Dominican journalist Andres Abreu moved to Grand Rapids, Michigan in 1991. Seeing the growing number of Hispanic and Latino Americans in West Michigan, with the demographic tripling between 1990 and 2000, he sought to create a Spanish language newspaper to serve the community. When interviewed by Instituto Cervantes at Harvard University, Abreu said that he chose to publish only in Spanish "because it is the Spanish-speaking community that is interested in the Latino world; Hispanics who speak English are more integrated in the Anglo than in the Hispanic community." While he was working at a factory full-time, Abreu and his wife published the first edition of El Vocero Hispano on February 24, 1993, using an old Apple Inc. computer. The newspaper was originally in a tabloid format with a circulation of 3,000 papers weekly.

In 1999, the paper launched its news website. By 2008, the newspaper had grown to a weekly circulation of 20,000. The Great Recession affected the paper's funding and circulation due to the lack of revenue from advertisements, selling its pre-printing press and moving to smaller offices. El Vocero Hispano previously collaborated with The Grand Rapids Press, though as the Press was restructured, contacts between the papers diminished by 2009. By 2016, the paper saw a rebound in revenue since the recession. It then expanded its presence on social media and created a studio for guests and interviews.

El Vocero Hispano has collaborated with Grand Rapids television station WOOD-TV, with the news station allowing the publication of its weather forecasts in exchange for assistance with some news segments. During the COVID-19 pandemic, the paper and WOOD-TV reported on the effects that the pandemic had on the Latino community.

== Editorial opinion ==
Founder and editor Abreu has voiced support for media pluralism and competition as a way to promote professional journalism. Abreu helped organize demonstrations in Grand Rapids during the 2006 United States immigration reform protests.
