= South Main Baptist Church =

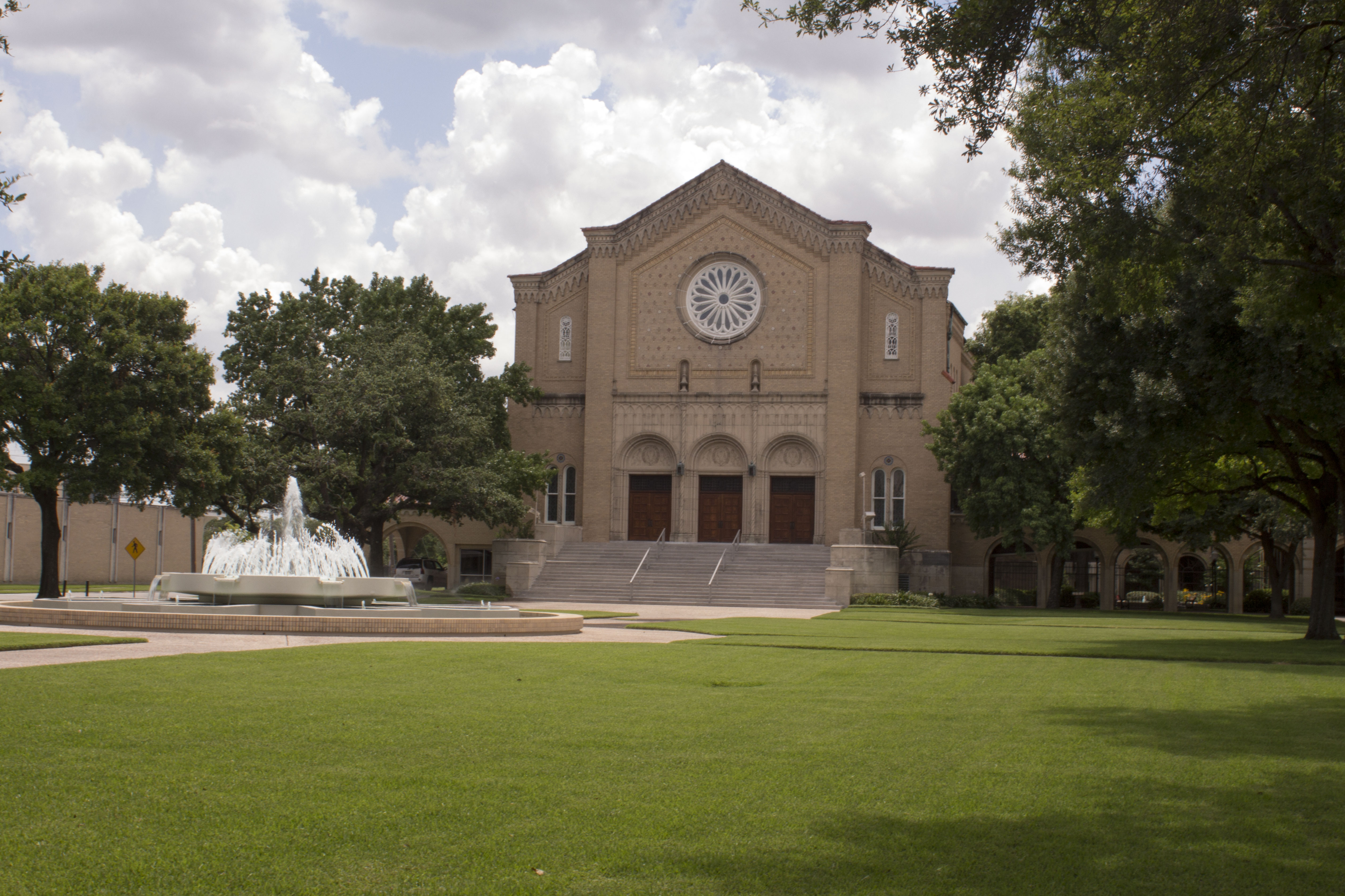
- South Main Baptist Church
- 29°44′9″N 95°22′58″W
- Location: Houston, Texas
- Country: United States
- Denomination: Baptist
- Previous denomination: Southern Baptist
- Website: smbc.org

History
- Former name: Tuam Avenue Baptist Church
- Founded: 15 November 1903

Architecture
- Architect(s): Sanguinet, Staats, Hedrick, and Gottlieb
- Years built: 1924-1930

Clergy
- Pastor: Dr. Steve Wells

South Main Baptist Church is a Baptist church in Houston, Texas. Located in Houston's midtown area, the church has a long history in the city. The church was named "Church of the Year" by Guideposts Magazine.

== History ==
The church was founded in 1903 as Tuam Avenue Baptist Church. It moved to its current location on South Main Street in 1930 and was renamed South Main Baptist Church. Between 1934 and 1939, the church hosted the University of Houston campus before the university moved to its current location on Cullen Blvd.

Sanguinet, Staats, Hedrick A and Gottlieb were hired to design the new structure in 1924 for the then Tuam Baptist Church. The church moved to its current location when the new building was completed in 1930. A service by Dr. George W. Truett was held to commemorate the new structure.

South Main is a member of the Baptist General Convention of Texas and the Cooperative Baptist Fellowship. It was a member of the Southern Baptist Convention for over 90 years, but has now withdrawn.

== Missions ==
South Main Baptist Church assisted in the creation of Operation San Andres, a non-profit group that feeds orphans in Peru.
