= Houston Chronicle =

Daily newspaper in Houston, Texas, US

- Front page of the Houston Chronicle from May 26, 2006
- Type: Daily newspaper
- Format: Broadsheet
- Owner: Hearst Communications
- Publisher: Nancy Meyer
- Editor: Kelly Ann Scott
- Founded: 1901; 125 years ago
- Headquarters: Houston Chronicle Building, 4747 Southwest Fwy., Houston, Texas 77027
- Country: United States
- Circulation: 35,200 Average print circulation
- ISSN: 1074-7109
- OCLC number: 30348909
- Website: houstonchronicle.com

The Houston Chronicle is the largest daily newspaper in Houston, Texas, United States. With the 1995 buyout of its longtime rival the Houston Post, the Chronicle became Houston's newspaper of record.

The Houston Chronicle is the largest daily newspaper owned and operated by the Hearst Corporation, a privately held multinational corporate media conglomerate with $10 billion in revenues. The paper employs nearly 2,000 people, including approximately 300 journalists, editors, and photographers. The Chronicle has bureaus in Washington, D.C., and Austin. The paper reports that its web site averages 125 million page views per month.

The publication serves as the "newspaper of record" of the Houston area. Previously headquartered in the Houston Chronicle Building at 801 Texas Avenue, Downtown Houston, the Houston Chronicle is now located at 4747 Southwest Freeway.

While Houston Chronicle staff formerly published on the ad-supported, non-subscriber site Chron.com, today Chron and Houston Chronicle have separate websites and newsrooms. Houstonchronicle.com, launched in 2012, is a subscriber-only site that contains everything found in the daily print edition.

== History ==
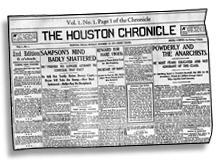
Front page of the first edition of the Houston Chronicle, October 14, 1901

=== 1901–1926: Marcellus E. Foster era ===
The Houston Chronicle was founded in 1901 by a former reporter for the now-defunct Houston Post, Marcellus E. Foster. Foster, who had been covering the Spindletop oil boom for the Post, invested in Spindletop and took $30 of the return on that investment—at the time equivalent to a week's wages—and used it to fund the Chronicle.

The Chronicle's first edition was published on October 14, 1901, and sold for two cents per copy, at a time when most papers sold for five cents each. At the end of its first month in operation, the Chronicle had a circulation of 4,378—roughly one tenth of the population of Houston at the time. Within the first year of operation, the paper purchased and consolidated the Daily Herald.

In 1908, Foster asked Jesse H. Jones, a local businessman and prominent builder, to construct a new office and plant for the paper, "and offered [a] half-interest in the newspaper as a down payment, with twenty years to pay the remainder. Jones agreed, and the resulting Chronicle Building was one of the finest in the South."

Under Foster, the paper's circulation grew from about 7,000 in 1901 to 75,000 on weekdays and 85,000 on Sundays by 1926. Foster continued to write columns under the pen name Mefo, and drew much attention in the 1920s for his opposition to the Ku Klux Klan (KKK). He sold the rest of his interest to Jesse H. Jones on June 26, 1926, and promptly retired.

=== Goodfellows ===
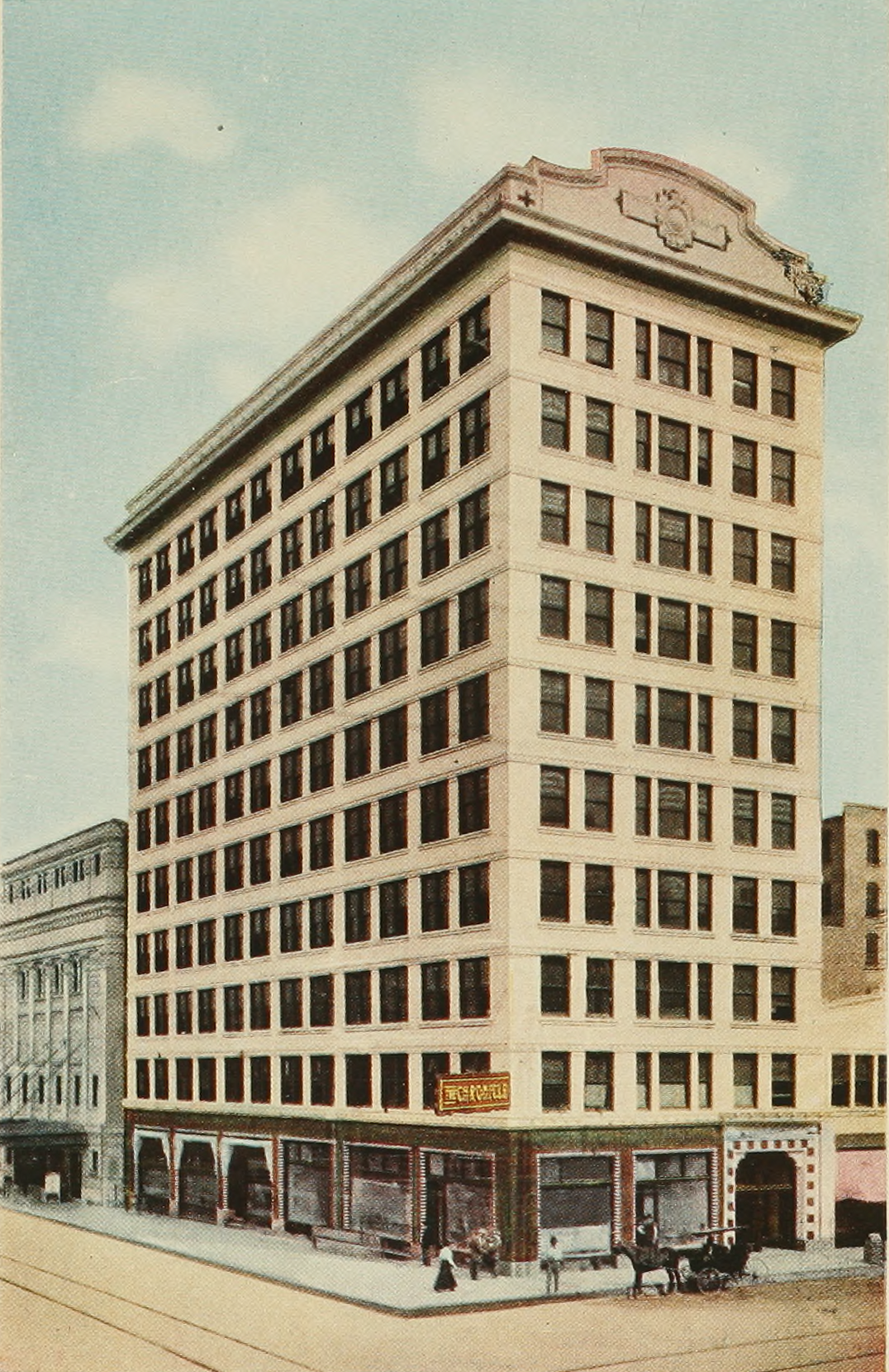
Illustration of the Houston Chronicle building, 1913

In 1911, city editor George Kepple started Goodfellows. On Christmas Eve 1911, Kepple passed a hat among the Chronicle's reporters to collect money to buy toys for a shoe-shine boy.

Goodfellows continues today through donations made by the newspaper and its readers. It has grown into a citywide program that provides needy children between the ages of two and ten with toys during the winter holidays. In 2003, Goodfellows distributed almost 250,000 toys to more than 100,000 needy children in the Greater Houston area.

=== 1926–1956: Jesse H. Jones era ===
In 1926, Jesse H. Jones became the sole owner of the paper. He had approached Foster about selling, and Foster had answered, "What will you give me?" Jones described the buyout of Foster as follows:

Wanting to be liberal with Foster if I bought him out, since he had created the paper and originally owned most of the stock, and had made a success of it, I thought for a while before answering and finally asked him how much he owed. He replied, "On real estate and everything about 200,000 dollars." I then said to him that I would give him 300,000 dollars in cash, having in mind that this would pay his debts and give him 100,000 spending money. In addition, I would give him a note for 500,000 secured by a mortgage on the Chronicle Building, the note to be payable (interest and principal) at the rate of 35,000 a year for thirty-five years, which I figured was about his expectancy. I would also pay him 20,000 dollars a year as editor of the paper and 6,000 dollars a year to continue writing the daily front-page column, "MEFO", on the condition that either of us could cancel the editorship and/or the MEFO-column contracts on six months' notice, and that, if I canceled both the column and the editorship, I would give him an additional 6,000 dollars a year for life. I considered the offer substantially more than the Chronicle was worth at the time. No sooner had I finished stating my proposition than he said, "I will take it", and the transaction was completed accordingly.

— pp. 121–122 of Jesse H. Jones: The Man and the Statesman by Bascom N. Timmons, copyright 1956 Henry Holt and Company

In 1937, Jesse H. Jones transferred ownership of the paper to the newly established Houston Endowment Inc. Jones retained the title of publisher until his death in 1956.

According to the Handbook of Texas online, the Chronicle generally represented very conservative political views during the 1950s:

... the Chronicle generally represented the very conservative political interests of the Houston business establishment. As such, it eschewed controversial political topics, such as integration or the impacts of rapid economic growth on life in the city. It did not perform investigative journalism. This resulted in a stodgy newspaper that failed to capture the interests of newcomers to the city. By 1959, circulation of the rival Houston Post had pulled ahead of the Chronicle.

Jones, a lifelong Democrat who organized the Democratic National Convention to be in Houston in 1928, and who spent long years in public service first under the Wilson administration, helping to found the Red Cross during World War I, and later famously under the Roosevelt administration, described the paper's mission in these terms:

I regard the publication of a newspaper as a distinct public trust, and one not to be treated lightly or abused for selfish purposes or to gratify selfish whims. A great daily newspaper can remain a power for good only so long as it is uninfluenced by unworthy motives, and unbought by the desire for gain. A newspaper which can be neither bought nor bullied is the greatest asset of a city or state. Naturally, a newspaper makes mistakes in judgment, as it does in type; but, so long as errors are honestly made, they are not serious when general results are considered.

The success or failure of a particular issue is of little consequence compared with the all-important principle of a fearless and honest newspaper. This I intend the Chronicle shall always be, a newspaper for all the people, democratic in fact and in principle, standing for the greatest good to the greatest number, championing and defending what it believes to be right, and condemning and opposing what it believes to be wrong.

Such have always been the policies of the Chronicle and to such it is now rededicated."

Under Jones' watch, the Chronicle bought KTRH, one of Houston's oldest radio stations, in 1929. In 1954, Jones led a syndicate that signed on Houston's third television station, KTRK-TV.

=== 1956–1965: John T. Jones era ===
The board of Houston Endowment named John T. Jones, nephew of Jesse H. Jones, as editor of the Chronicle. Houston Endowment president, J. Howard Creekmore, was named publisher. In 1961, John T. Jones hired William P. Steven as editor. Steven had previously been editor of the Tulsa Tribune and the Minneapolis Star Tribune, and credited with turning around the declining readership of both papers. One of his innovations was the creation of a regular help column called "Watchem", where ordinary citizens could voice their complaints. The Chicago Tribune later called this column a pioneer and prototype of the modern newspaper "Action Line".

Steven's progressive political philosophy soon created conflict with the very conservative views of the Houston Endowment board, especially when he editorially supported the election of Lyndon B. Johnson, the Democratic candidate for president. However, more than political philosophy was involved: Robert A. Caro revealed in his biography of Johnson that written assurance of this support from John T. Jones had been the price demanded by Johnson in January 1964 in return for approval of the merger of Houston's National Bank of Commerce, in which Jones had a financial interest, with another Houston bank, the Texas National.

In 1964, the Chronicle purchased the assets of its evening newspaper competitor, the Houston Press, becoming the only evening newspaper in the city. By then, the Chronicle had a circulation of 254,000—the largest of any paper in Texas. The Atlantic Monthly credited the growth to the changes instigated by Steven.

In the summer of 1965, Jones decided to buy a local television station that was already owned by the Houston Endowment. He resigned from the Houston Endowment board to avoid a conflict of interest, though he remained as publisher of the Chronicle. On September 2, 1965, Jones made a late-night visit to the Steven home, where he broke the news that the Endowment board had ordered him to dismiss Steven. Jones had to comply. On September 3, the paper published a story announcing that Everett Collier was now the new editor.

No mention was made of Steven or the Houston Endowment board. Houston Post staff wrote an article about the change, but top management killed it. Only two weekly papers in Houston mentioned it: Forward Times (which targeted the African-American community) and the Houston Tribune (an ultra-conservative paper). Both papers had rather small circulations and no influence among the city's business community. The two major newspapers in Houston never mentioned Steven for many years thereafter.

=== 1965–1987: J. Howard Creekmore era ===
John J. Jones left the Chronicle not long after Steven's ouster. J. Howard Creekmore, president of the Houston Endowment, took John Jones' place at the Chronicle. Everett D. Collier replaced Steven as editor. Collier remained in this position until his retirement in 1979.

J. Howard Creekmore was born in Abilene, Texas, in 1905. His parents died while he was young, so he was raised by his stepmother. The family moved to Houston in 1920. Howard enrolled in Rice Institute, where he graduated with degrees in history and English. After graduation, he went to work for Jesse Jones as a bookkeeper. Jones took an interest in the young man's career, and put him through law school. Creekmore passed the bar exam in 1932 and returned to work for Jones. He held several positions in the Jones business empire. In 1959, he was named to the board of Houston Endowment, and was promoted to president of the board in 1964.

By 1965, Creekmore had persuaded other directors of Houston Endowment to sell several business properties, including the Chronicle. Houston oilman John Mecom offered $85 million for the newspaper, its building, a 30 percent interest in Texas National Bank of Commerce, and the historic Rice Hotel. Early in 1966, Mecom encountered problems raising the additional cash to complete the transaction. He then began lining up potential buyers for the newspaper, which included non-Houstonians such as Sam Newhouse, Otis Chandler and the Scripps-Howard organization. Creekmore strongly believed that local persons should own the paper. He insisted that Mecom pay the $84 million debt immediately in cash. Mecom cancelled his purchase agreement.

In 1968, the Chronicle set a Texas newspaper circulation record. In 1981, the business pages—which until then had been combined with sports—became its own section of the newspaper. Creekmore remained as publisher until Houston Endowment sold the paper to the Hearst Corporation.

=== 1987–present: Hearst Corporation era ===
On March 12, 1987, the Hearst Corporation announced that it would buy the Houston Chronicle from the Houston Endowment for $400 million. The sale was completed on May 1, 1987, after it increased to $415 million from revised agreements.

Richard J. V. Johnson, who had joined the paper as a copy editor in 1956, and worked up to executive vice president in 1972, and president in 1973, remained as chairman and publisher until he retired on April 1, 2002. He was succeeded by Jack Sweeney.

In February 1994, the Chronicle switched to being a morning-only paper. With the demise of the Houston Post on April 18 the next year, the Chronicle became Houston's sole major daily newspaper, after Hearst acquired Post's assets.

On October 18, 2008, the paper endorsed Senator Barack Obama for President of the United States in the 2008 U.S. Presidential Election, the first Democrat to be endorsed by the newspaper since 1964, when it endorsed Texan Lyndon B. Johnson. It endorsed Mitt Romney in 2012, but endorsed Hillary Clinton in 2016, and Joe Biden in 2020.

Locally, the Chronicle endorsed Wendy Davis for governor in 2014, and Sylvester Turner for mayor in 2015. Additionally, the Chronicle initially endorsed Jeb Bush for the 2016 Republican primary, but did not endorse any other candidate after he dropped out.

=== 2018 source-fabrication scandal ===
In September 2018, then-executive editor Nancy Barnes released a statement on the Chronicle's website notifying readers for the first time that the paper's Austin bureau chief, Mike Ward, had resigned and was the subject of an internal investigation after questions were raised by a staff member over fabricating sources. Barnes opted not to disclose the source-fabrication or Ward's resignation to Chronicle readers and the general public until she was contacted by reporters at other outlets pursuing a story about the Chronicle's scandal—one full week after Ward had resigned. By the time Barnes informed the public about what would turn into the biggest journalism scandal of 2018, it had already become one of the worst kept secrets in Austin among the capitol press corps that writes about Texas politicians. The scandal had also become popular fodder among staffers who work at the capital. Within 45 minutes of being contacted by a freelance reporter for the Texas Observer, Barnes hastily issued a press release announcing that one of her reporters had been caught making up sources over the course of several years. Barnes never explained why the Chronicle decided against being transparent to it readers immediately, instead of waiting for word to leak to the extent that other news outlets started planning stories.

The sources being questioned in Ward's reporting were the product of "man-on-the-street" interviews from a story dealing with rebuilding efforts following Hurricane Harvey. Barnes said Houston Chronicle researchers had problems finding a number of sources quoted in Ward's story, so the newspaper hired investigative journalist David Wood, a Pulitzer Prize winner.

On November 8, 2018, one day before Barnes left for a position as senior vice president of news at National Public Radio, the Houston Chronicle released some of Wood's findings. The paper announced it was retracting a total of eight stories.

Barnes later went on to tell Columbia Journalism Review that the widespread fabrication apparent in Ward's articles was unprecedented, in her experience: "I've been an editor a long time and I have never seen anything like this, period.". None of the Chronicle's editors responsible for overseeing Ward's stories—including then-managing editor Vernon Loeb—assumed any responsibility for the fact that one of their reporters had been cheating for years under their noses. In many instances over the course of years, Loeb worked directly with Ward and even rewrote his stories for final publication.

The Austin American Statesman, where Ward worked as a reporter for 25 years covering the state's political class prior to joining the Houston Chronicle in 2014, also conducted an internal review of "his final years" of work at the paper.

A copy of the original story that led to the investigation has been removed from the Chronicle's website, though is still available elsewhere with Austin-based NPR affiliate KUT hosting it on their site with an editor's note.

== Headquarters ==
=== 4747 Southwest Freeway ===
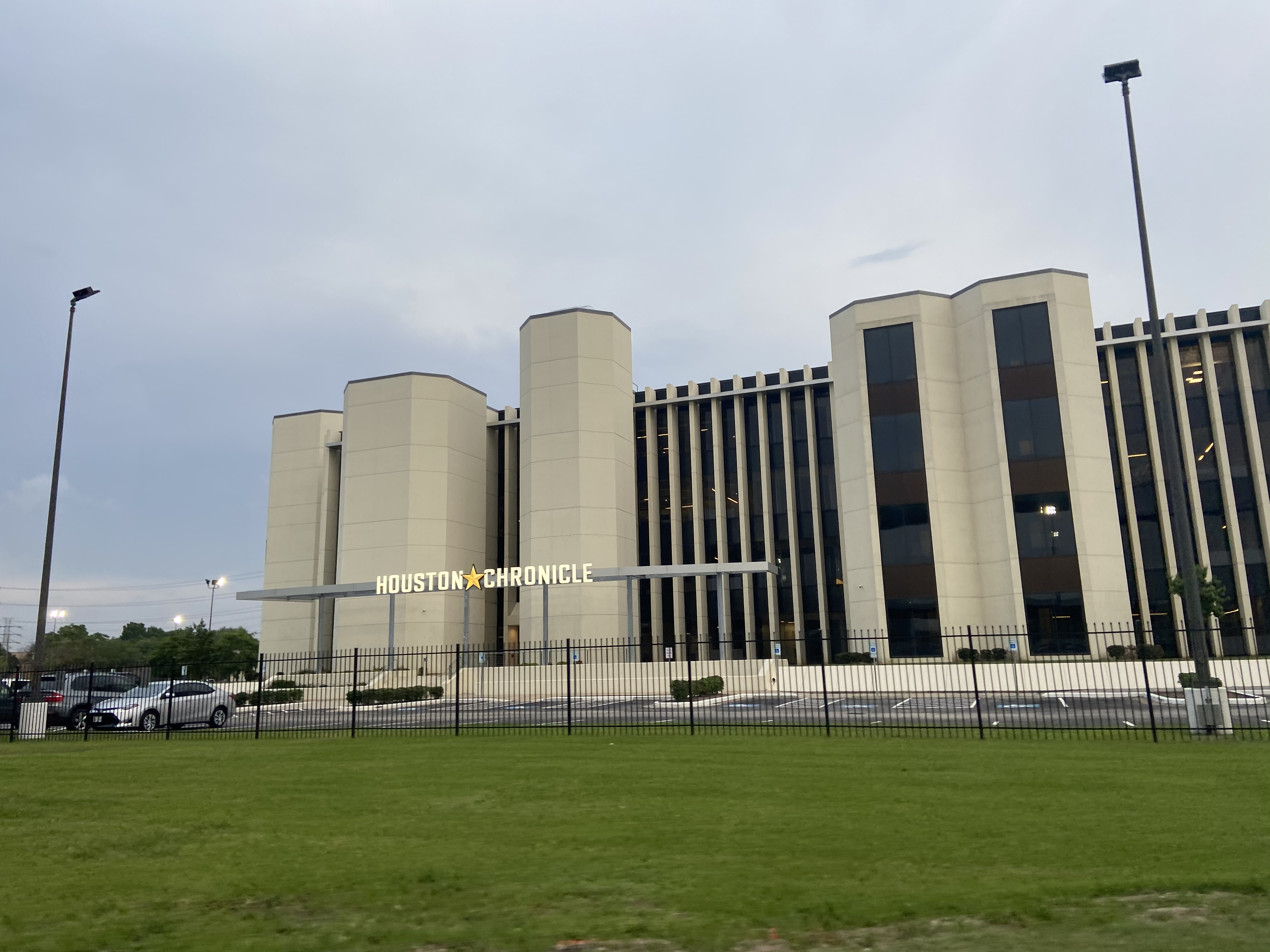
The current Houston Chronicle headquarters, formerly the Houston Post headquarters

On July 21, 2014, the Chronicle announced that its Downtown employees were moving to the 610 Loop campus, at the intersection of the 610 Loop and U.S. Route 59/I-69 (Southwest Freeway).

The facility, previously used as the Houston Post headquarters, will have a total of seven buildings with a total of over 440,000 square feet (41,000 m^{2}) of space. The original building is a 1970s four-story "New Brutalist" building.

As of 2016, the building housed the Chronicle Production Department, as well as the offices of the Spanish newspaper La Voz de Houston.

=== 801 Texas Avenue ===
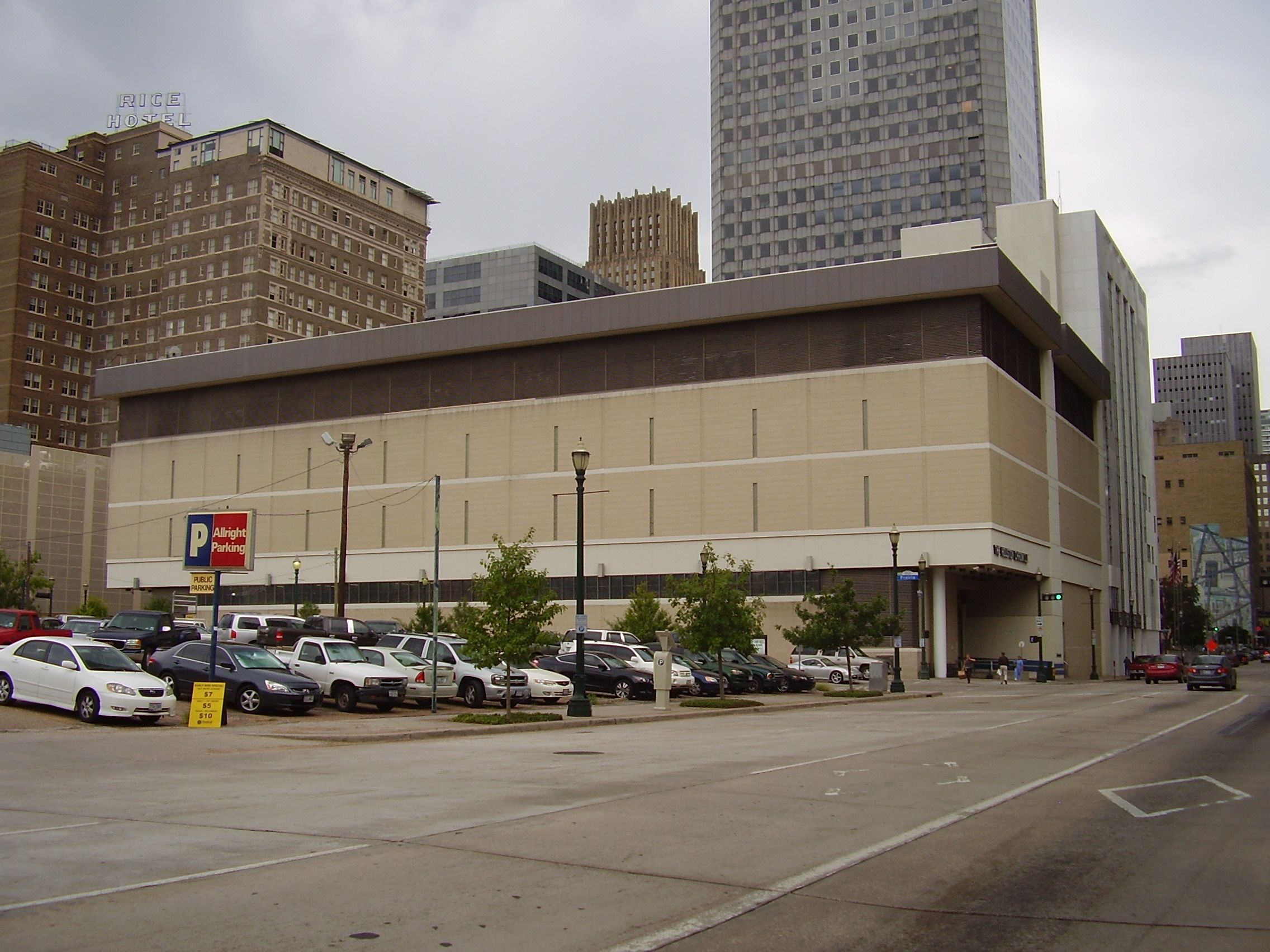
Houston Chronicle headquarters in Downtown Houston before its demolition

The Houston Chronicle building in Downtown Houston was the headquarters of the Houston Chronicle. The facility included a loading dock, office space, a press room, and production areas. It had ten stories above ground and three stories below ground. The printing presses used by the newspaper spanned three stories. The presses were two stories below ground and one above. In the Downtown facility, the presses there were decommissioned in the late 2000s. The newsroom within the facility had bullpen-style offices with a few private cubicles and offices on the edges. The facility was connected to the downtown Houston tunnel system. Turner wrote that "in recent decades," 801 Texas Avenue "offered viewers an architectural visage of unadorned boxiness.... An accretion of five buildings made into one, it featured a maze of corridors, cul-de-sacs and steps that seemed to spring on strollers at the most unexpected times."

The facility, which was 106 years old in 2016, was originally four separate structures, which were joined to make one building. Jesse H. Jones erected the first Chronicle building, a long, narrow structure clad in granite, on the corner of Travis Street and Texas Avenue in 1910. The second building, the Majestic Theater, was built west of the Chronicle building. The second building built by Jones opened in 1910. In 1918, the third Jones building, Milam Building, opened west of the theater. An annex was built on the north side of the main building in 1938 and gained a fifth floor in the 1960s. The fifth building was a production plant, built north of the original four buildings. They were joined in a major renovation and modernization project, which was completed in the late 1960s.

On April 25, 2017, it was demolished and reduced to rubble. The site is now occupied by the Texas Tower.

== People ==
=== Awards ===
- 2000: Houston's M. D. Anderson Cancer Center gave the Chronicle its Joseph T. Ainsworth Volunteer Community Award for making the newspaper available at a "greatly reduced rate" to the hospital and its patients.
- 2002: Holocaust Museum Houston awarded the Chronicle its "Guardian of the Human spirit" award. The presenter, Janis Goldstein, said the award was given "because the Houston Chronicle embraces the causes most dear to it with a depth and scope that goes well beyond what is expected." Also, that "the Chronicle gives of itself to build a community that will embrace tolerance, understanding, and diversity and will speak out against prejudice and unfairness of any kind."

=== Individual awards ===
- 1963: William Porterfield won an Ernie Pyle Award.
- 1989–1997: Carlos Antonio Rios, a Chronicle photographer since 1978, has repeatedly been honored for his photojournalism by the National Association of Hispanic Journalists.
- 2003: James Howard Gibbons received third place in the "Hearst Distinguished Journalism Awards", an internal contest held between Hearst's newspapers, for his editorial piece "When Will the U.S. Liberate Texas?"
- Leon Hale, a long-time columnist and author of 11 books, recently received the Lon Tinkle Award for Excellence Sustained Throughout a Career from the Texas Institute of Letters, of which Hale is a member.
- Jason Witmer won first place in the 48 Hour–Web category of the National Press Photographers Association's annual Best of Photojournalism in 2010 for his piece, "Too Manly for Quilt Show". Whitmer won second place in the News Feature–Web category for "Suddenly homeless in Houston".

=== Pulitzer Prize ===
- 2022: Pulitzer Prize for Editorial Writing. Lisa Falkenberg, Michael Lindenberger, Joe Holley and Luis Carrasco
- 2015: Pulitzer Prize for Commentary. Lisa Falkenberg — 2015 winner for commentary. "For vividly-written, groundbreaking columns about grand jury abuses that led to a wrongful conviction and uncovered other egregious problems in the legal and immigration systems."

The newspaper and its staff have several times been Pulitzer finalists:

- Dudley Althaus – 1992 finalist in international reporting: "For his articles on the causes of the cholera epidemic in Peru and Mexico."
- Tony Freemantle – 1997 finalist in international reporting: "For his reporting from Rwanda, South Africa, El Salvador and Guatemala on why crimes against humanity go unstopped and unpunished."
- Nick Anderson – 2007 finalist for editorial cartooning: "For his pungent cartoons on an array of issues, and for his bold use of animation." Anderson won the Pulitzer in 2005 when working for The Courier-Journal, Louisville, Kentucky.
- Staff – 2009 finalist for breaking news coverage: "For taking full advantage of online technology and its newsroom expertise to become a lifeline to the city when Hurricane Ike struck, providing vital minute-by-minute updates on the storm, its flood surge and its aftermath."
- Staff - 2017 finalist for public service. "For exposing the grave injustice of arbitrary cost-cutting by the State of Texas that denied tutoring, counseling and other vital special education services to families, hindering the futures of tens of thousands of children.
- Joe Holley and Evan Mintz – 2017 finalist for editorial writing. "For editorials on gun laws, gun culture and gun tragedies that combined wit, eloquence and moral power in a fine brew of commonsense argumentation."
- Staff – 2018 finalist for breaking news. "For comprehensive and dynamic coverage of Hurricane Harvey that captured real-time developments of the unprecedented scale of the disaster and provided crucial information to its community during the storm and its aftermath."

=== Other notable people ===
- Fernando Dovalina Jr. (former assistant managing editor)
- Maxine Mesinger (gossip columnist)
- Leon Hale (columnist)
- Richard Justice (sports writer)
- Heidi Van Horne (automotive columnist)
- Ken Hammond (editor, Texas Magazine, Chronicle Sunday Edition)
- Sunny Nash (contributor, columnist, photographer, author)
- Marjorie Paxson (influential women's page editor)
- Julie Mason, newspaper and radio journalist
- Alison Cook (James Beard Award-Winning Restaurant Critic)
- Joy Sewing, first Black columnist in the newspaper's history

== Other publications ==
In April 2004 the Houston Chronicle began carrying a Spanish-language supplement, the entertainment magazine La Vibra. La Vibra caters to speakers of Spanish and bilingual English-Spanish speakers, and is mainly distributed in Hispanic neighborhoods. In December 2004 the Chronicle acquired the Spanish-language newspaper La Voz de Houston.

== Criticism ==
=== Robert Jensen on the September 11 attacks ===
In the weeks following the September 11 attacks, the Houston Chronicle published a series of opinion articles by University of Texas journalism professor Robert Jensen that asserted the United States was "just as guilty" as the hijackers in committing acts of violence and compared that attack with the history of U.S. attacks on civilians in other countries. The opinion piece resulted in hundreds of angry letters to the editor and reportedly over 4,000 angry responses to Jensen.

Among them were claims of insensitivity against the newspaper and of giving an unduly large audience to a position characterized as being extremist. University of Texas president Larry Faulkner issued a response denouncing Jensen's as "a fountain of undiluted foolishness on issues of public policy", noting "[h]e is not speaking in the University's name and may not speak in its name."

=== Light rail controversy ===
The document was online for only an hour, but long enough to be viewed by some readers. Soon after, the Houston Review, a conservative newspaper published by students at the University of Houston, printed the memo's full text and an accompanying commentary that criticized the paper.

Harris County District Attorney Rosenthal later dismissed the Chronicle's complaint, finding it without merit on the grounds that the statute did not apply. Rosenthal's involvement in the probe itself came under fire by the Houston Press, which in editorials questioned whether Rosenthal was too close to TTM: from 2000 to 2004, Rosenthal accepted some $30,000 in donations from known TTM supporters.

=== Sandoval family interview ===
In early 2004, Chronicle reporter Lucas Wall interviewed the family of Leroy Sandoval, a Marine from Houston who was killed in Iraq. After the article appeared, Sandoval's stepfather and sister called into Houston talk radio station KSEV and said that a sentence alleging "President Bush's failure to find weapons of mass destruction" in Iraq misrepresented their views on the war and President George W. Bush, that Wall had pressured them for a quotation that criticized Bush, and that the line alleging Bush's "failure" was included against the wishes of the family.

A dispute ensued between KSEV radio show host/owner Dan Patrick and an assistant managing editor at the Chronicle. The incident prompted Patrick to join the call for a boycott of the paper. The story was also picked up by the local Houston television stations and, a week later, the O'Reilly Factor. Eventually, Chronicle publisher Jack Sweeney contacted the Sandoval family to apologize.

=== Purchase of Houston Post assets ===
Internal memos obtained via FOIA from the Justice Department antitrust attorneys who investigated the closing of the Houston Post said the Chronicle's parent organization struck a deal to buy the Post six months before it closed. The memos, first obtained by the alternative paper the Houston Press, say the Chronicle's conglomerate and the Post "reached an agreement in October, 1994, for the sale of Houston Post Co.'s assets for approximately $120 million."

=== Tom DeLay poll ===
In January 2006 the Chronicle hired Richard Murray of the University of Houston to conduct an election survey in the district of U.S. Rep. Tom DeLay, in light of his 2005 indictment by District Attorney Ronnie Earle for alleged campaign money violations. The Chronicle said that its poll showed "severely eroded support for U.S. Rep Tom DeLay in his district, most notably among Republicans who have voted for him before."

Former Texas Secretary of State Jack Rains contacted the Chronicle's James Howard Gibbons, alleging that the poll appeared to incorrectly count non-Republican Primary voters in its sample. Rains also asserted that Murray had a conflict of interest in the poll, as Murray's son Keir was a political consultant working for Nick Lampson, DeLay's Democratic challenger in 2006.

== Other controversies ==
The Houston Chronicle has faced significant challenges with its journalistic integrity. In 2020, the paper faced allegations of publishing articles without properly adhering to its own ethics policy, especially in regards to contacting subjects before publishing negative portrayals. There were also claims suggesting retaliation against individuals for not purchasing advertisements. This trust was further eroded in 2018 when the Chronicle retracted eight articles after it was revealed they were significantly based on sources whose existence could not be verified. An extensive review of the articles penned by Austin bureau chief Mike Ward showed that out of 275 individuals he quoted in various stories, 44% could not be located or confirmed. Beyond the retractions, an additional 64 of Ward's stories required corrections due to the inclusion of unverified sources, further tainting the paper's credibility. This was a result of an examination of 744 stories written by Ward since January 2014, with independent investigators unable to verify the existence of nearly half of the individuals he had quoted.

== Availability of Houston Post articles ==
Some Houston Post articles had been made available in the archives of the Houston Chronicle website, but by 2005 they were removed. The Houston Chronicle online editor Mike Read said that the Houston Chronicle decided to remove Houston Post articles from the website after the 2001 United States Supreme Court New York Times Co. v. Tasini decision; the newspaper originally planned to filter articles not allowed by the decision and to post articles that were not prohibited by the decision. The Houston Chronicle decided not to post or re-post any more Houston Post articles because of difficulties in complying with the New York Times Co. v. Tasini decision with the resources that were available to the newspaper.

People interested in reading Houston Post articles may view them on microfilm. The Houston Public Library has the newspaper on microfilm from 1880 to 1995 and the Houston Post Index from 1976 to 1994. The 1880–1900 microfilm is in the Texas and Local History Department of the Julia Ideson Building, while 1900–1995 is in the Jesse H. Jones Building, the main building of the Central Library. In addition, the M.D. Anderson Library at the University of Houston has the Houston Post available on microfilm from 1880 to 1995, and the Houston Post Index from 1976 to 1979 and from 1987 to 1994.

Online archives of the Houston Post are available in GenealogyBank and Newspapers.com via paywall.

== See also ==
- Houston Post
- Houston Press
