= Vibra =

Vibra may refer to:

- Vibra Healthcare, Pennsylvania
- Doxycycline (redirect from Vibra-Tabs)
- Vibras (album) J. Balvin 2018
- La Vibra digital publication in Spanish based in the United States
- Vibraslap (redirect from Vibra-slap)
- Vibra São Paulo (formerly known as Credicard Hall) music theatre in São Paulo, Brazil
