= Bigmama Didn't Shop at Woolworth's =

1996 book by Sunny Nash

Bigmama Didn't Shop At Woolworth's cover art

Bigmama Didn't Shop at Woolworth's is a memoir by Sunny Nash about life with her part-Comanche grandmother during the Civil Rights Movement published by Texas A&M University Press in 1996. It was chosen as an Association of American University Presses Book for Understanding U.S. Race Relations. The book was also recommended by the Miami-Dade Public Library System for Native American Collections.

Nash's book, still in print and collected worldwide, consists of a collection of articles from Nash's newspaper column contributions to the Houston Chronicle (Texas Magazine, State Lines Column). Tony Pederson, then Chronicle executive editor and later Endowed Chair of Journalism at Southern Methodist University in Dallas, gave Nash her first Chronicle assignment. This assignment, "A Mission Completed For Doll," earned Nash regular publication in the State Lines column, edited by Ken Hammond, and publication in Hammond's collection, State Lines, illustrated by Rolf Laub, with a foreword by Leon Hale. Nash's "A Mission Completed For Doll" was later published in Nash's book.

“Indeed, Bigmama had a stoic bearing which combined with a wry sense of humor to produce a genre of cryptic, often cautionary witticisms all her own. Bigmama delivered one of these gems, for instance, in response to young Nash's materialistic yearnings before Christmas one year,” Elizabeth Lasch-Quinn, book review in The Mississippi Quarterly (Vol. 51, Issue 4), published by Johns Hopkins University Press.

In 1996, Texas First Lady, Laura Bush, invited Nash to read from Bigmama Didn't Shop At Woolworth's at the Inaugural Texas Book Festival. In 1997, Nash's book was included in The Writers Harvest: The National Reading to Benefit Hunger and Poverty. Melody Graulich based her paper, "The Spaces of Segregation," on the book. Graulich presented her paper at the American Studies Association Annual Meeting.

== Reception ==
The Library Journal recommended Bigmama for black studies or Texas history collections, writing, "Nash tells a story of the wrongs of racial prejudice..." and the School Library Journal wrote, "Young people will learn a lot from this book."

Glencoe literature: the reader's choice explained, "Edgar Gabriel Silex and Sunny Nash honor grandparents whose dignity inspired them..."

It has also been reviewed by Publishers Weekly, the Mississippi Quarterly, The Western Journal of Black Studies, and the Los Angeles Times.
