= La Vibra =

American digital publication

La Vibra is a digital publication in Spanish based in the United States. It is published by Impremedia., and is led by Los Angeles–based Editor Armando Tinoco.

La Vibra started out as a bilingual weekly entertainment magazine, focused on pop culture and celebrity news. Every day, in its website, La Vibra publishes breaking news, exclusive celebrity coverage, in-depth articles on streaming and linear TV, scoops and highlights on what's happening in social media.

Through different formats such as text, video, images and multimedia elements, La Vibra reports to the Spanish-speaking Latino community in the United States.

La Vibra publishes news stories on Facebook, Twitter, Instagram, and YouTube. It also produces a newsletter every day. La Vibra publishes under its Editorial Guidelines, Quality Standards, and Ethics.

== History ==
The staff at the Los Angeles–based La Opinión developed the supplement. It was first distributed in Los Angeles in the summer of 2000.

In 2004 the Houston Chronicle began carrying La Vibra, as part of an agreement between the Chronicle and La Opinión. The Chronicle produced 25% of the content for the Houston edition of La Vibra while the remainder, distributed nationally, was produced by the staff of La Opinión. As of 2004 the distribution, done in neighborhoods 65% or greater Hispanic/Latino, was 100,000 in the Houston area. La Vibra became a supplement within the Chronicle-owned La Voz de Houston. Publication of La Vibra in Houston ceased in 2009.

As of 2009 La Vibra was published in the New York City, Los Angeles, Chicago, San Francisco Bay Area, and Orlando regions.

In 2020, LaVibra.com was launched as a stand-alone digital website.

== Sections ==
- Famous
- Television
- Soap opera and series
- Music
- Fashion
