= Magnolia Hotel (Houston) =

Skyscraper in Houston, Texas, U.S.

Magnolia Hotel Houston
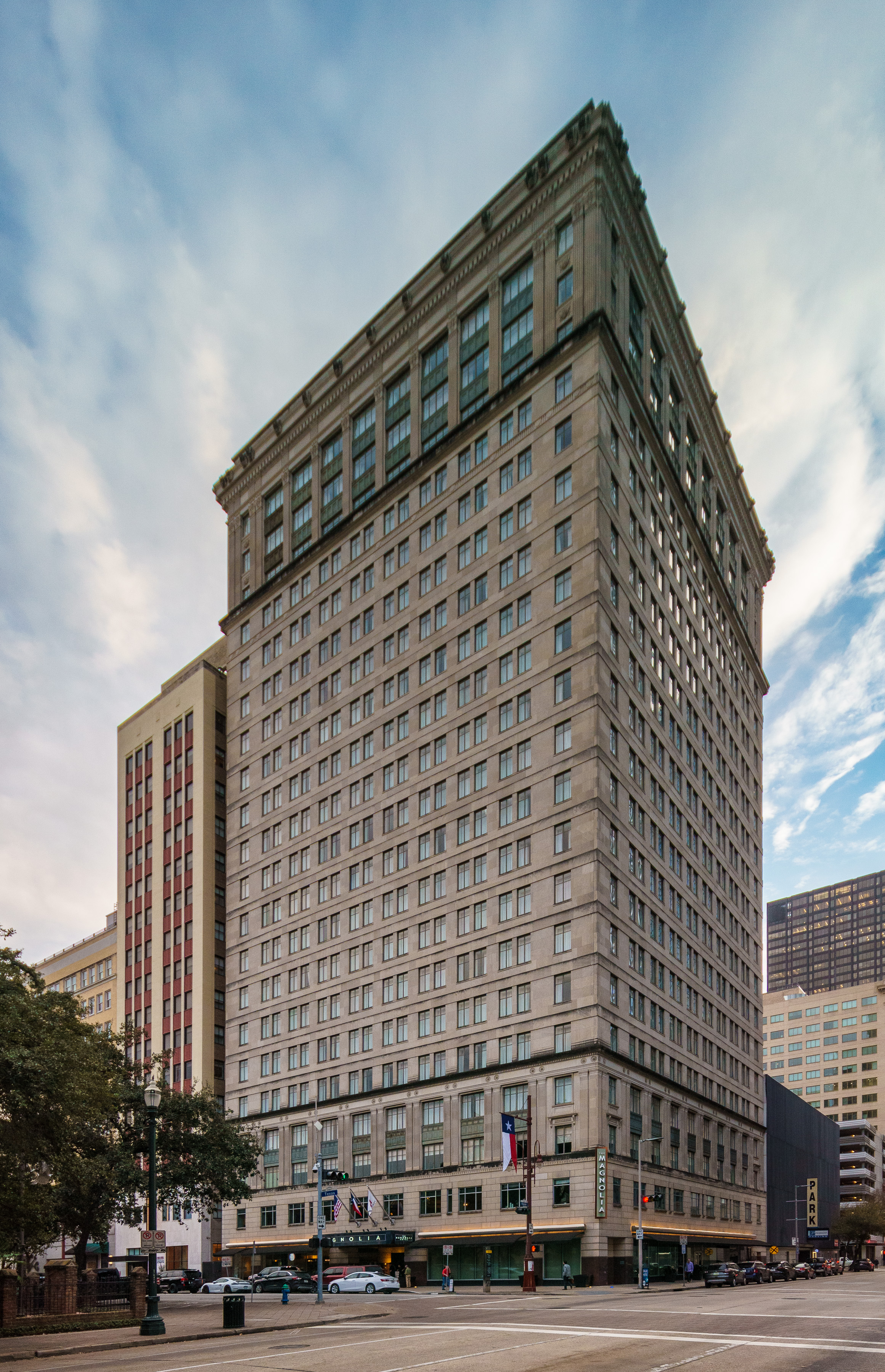

General information
- Location: 1100 Texas Avenue, Houston, Texas, U.S.
- Coordinates: 29.7589°N 95.3614°W
- Opening: 2003
- Owner: Magnolia Hotels

Height
- Height: 99.1 m (325 ft)

Technical details
- Floor count: 22

Design and construction
- Architects: Sanguient, Staats, Hendrick & Gottlieb; Mitchell Carlson Stone, Inc. Guy Thornton Design

Other information
- Number of rooms: 314
- Number of restaurants: 1

The Magnolia Hotel Houston is a hotel located at 1100 Texas Avenue, in downtown Houston, Texas, United States. It was built in 1926 as the Houston Post-Dispatch Building, home of the Houston Post-Dispatch newspaper, and until the following year was the tallest building in Houston. It was renamed the Shell Building in 1932, when it became a regional operations headquarters of the Shell Petroleum Corporation (a predecessor of the Shell Oil Company).

== See also ==
- Houston Post-Dispatch Building
