= Houston Post-Dispatch Building =

Historic building in Houston, Texas, U.S.

- U.S. National Register of Historic Places
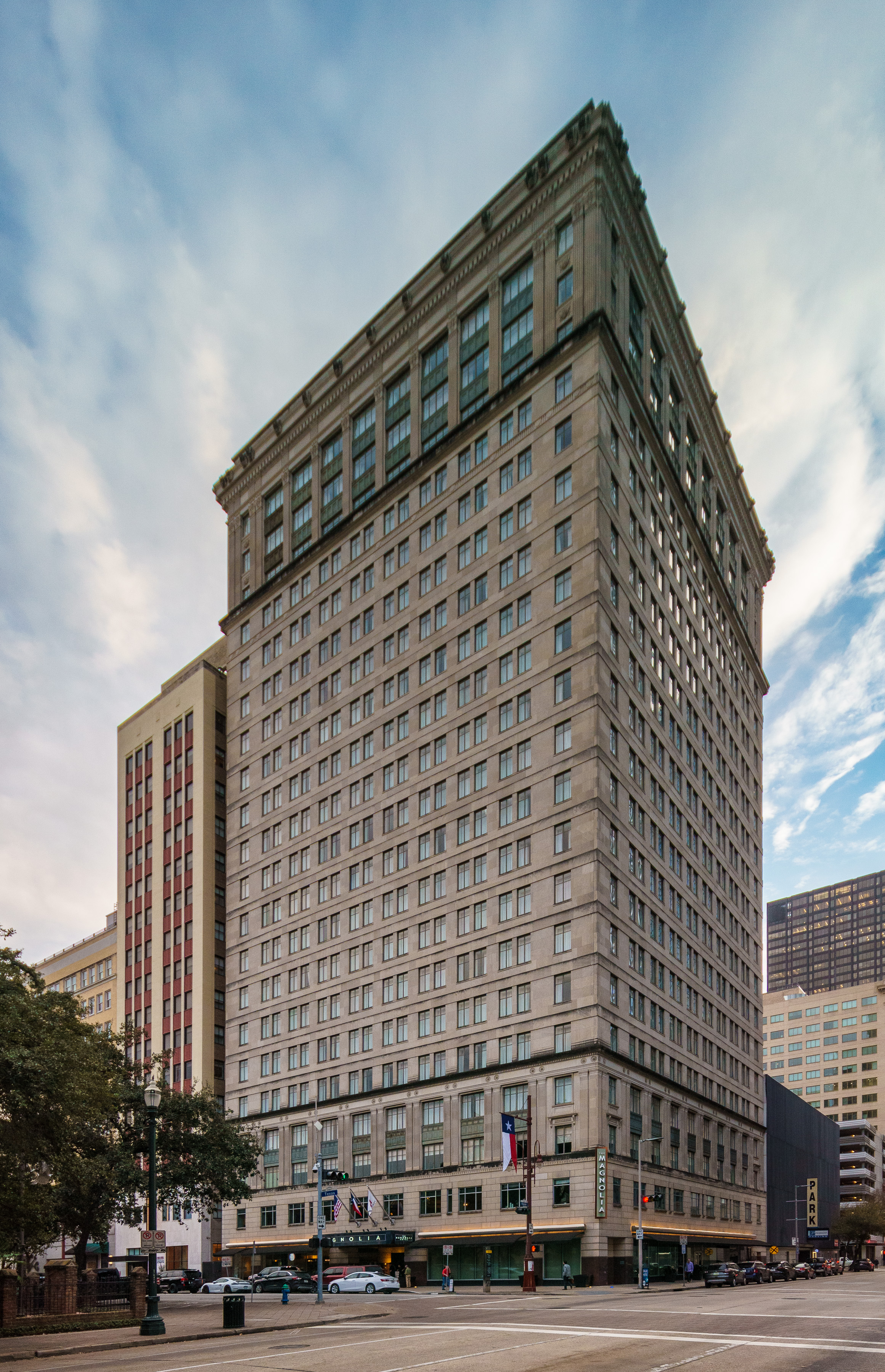

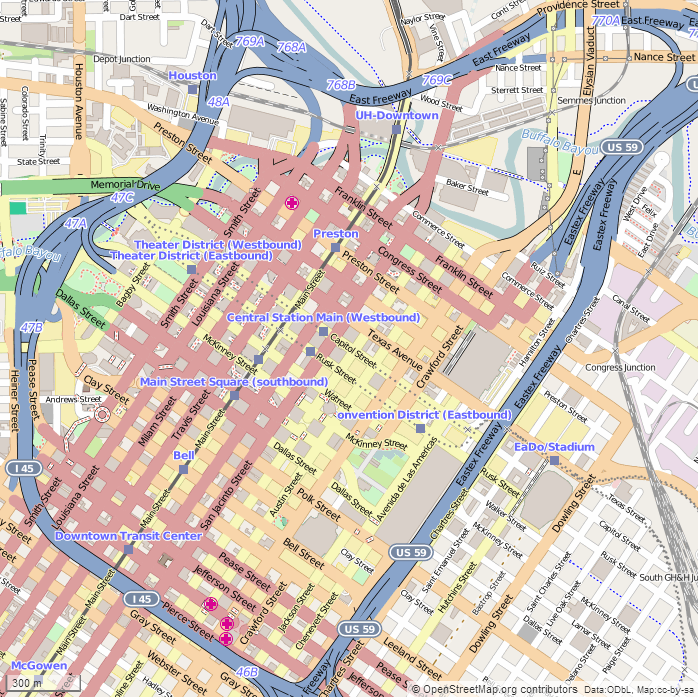
- Location within Houston Downtown Location within Texas Location within the United States
- Location: 609 Fannin Street, Houston, Texas
- Coordinates: 29°45′32″N 95°21′41″W
- Area: 0.4 acres (0.16 ha)
- Built: 1926
- Architect: Carl Staats, Don Hall
- Architectural style: Classical Revival, 3-part vertical block
- Restored: 2003
- Restored by: Guy Thornton
- NRHP reference No.: 02000072
- Added to NRHP: February 14, 2002

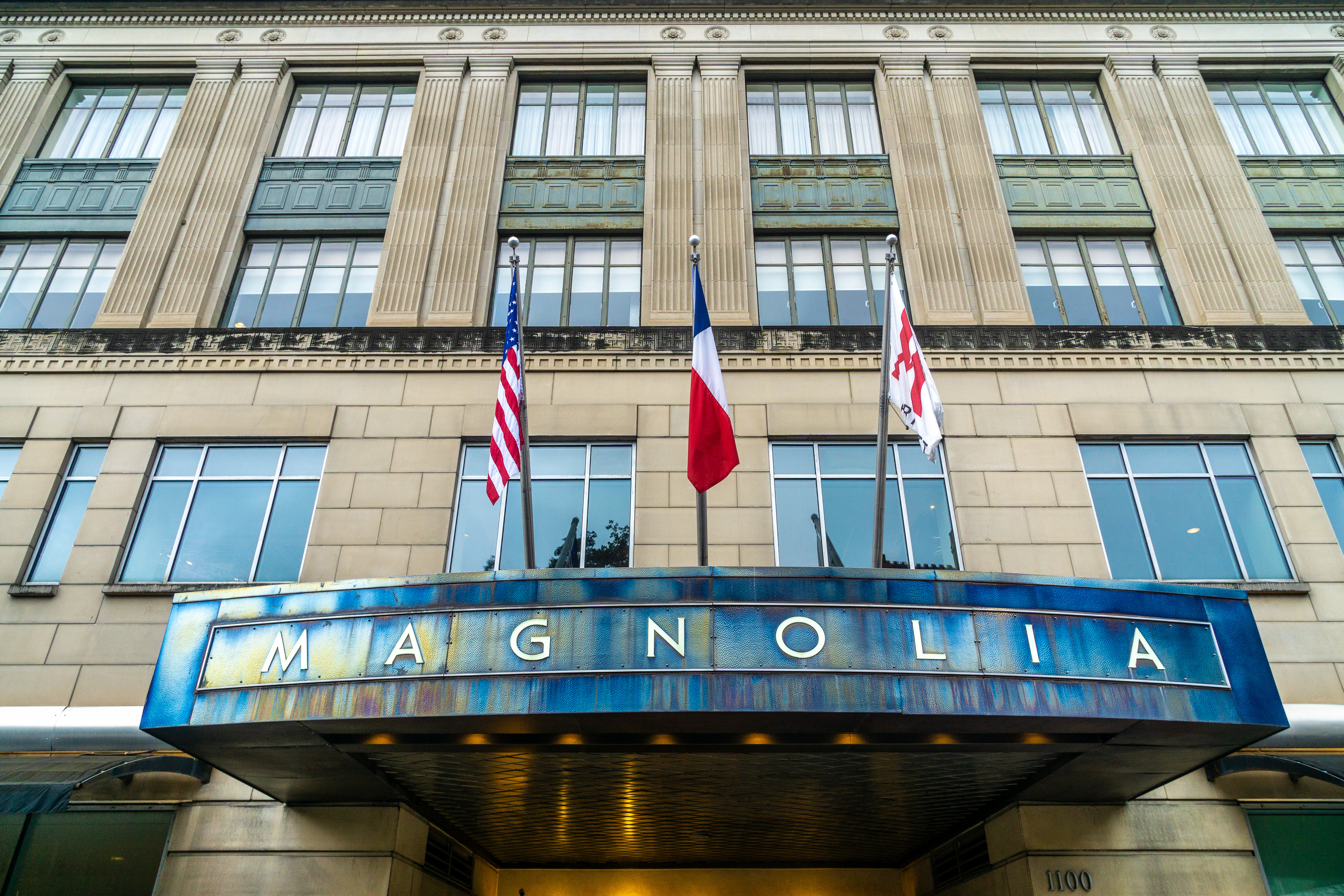
Magnolia hotel

The Magnolia Hotel, formerly the Houston Post-Dispatch Building, located at 609 Fannin in Houston, Texas, was listed on the National Register of Historic Places on February 14, 2002.

== History ==
The 22-story skyscraper was built by oil magnate Ross S. Sterling for his newspaper the Houston Post-Dispatch, (Note: Sterling had merged the Houston Post with the Houston Dispatch in 1924 to form the Houston Post-Dispatch, which was renamed back to the Houston Post in 1932.) at the corner of Texas and Fannin streets in 1926. At the time, it was one of the city's tallest skyscrapers. The newspaper's printing presses were visible through the windows, and the broadcast antenna for radio station KPR was located on the building's roof.

During the 1960s and 1970s, many details of the facade were removed. The building was restored to its previous appearance on the outside, with a modern interior, by Denver-based architect Guy Thornton. It opened in 2003 as the Magnolia Hotel.

== See also ==
- National Register of Historic Places listings in Harris County, Texas
- Magnolia Hotel (Houston)
