= Houston Post =

Defunct newspaper in Houston, Texas

The Houston Post
- Type: Daily newspaper
- Format: Broadsheet
- Founded: February 19, 1880
- Ceased publication: April 18, 1995
- Language: English
- Headquarters: Houston, Texas, United States

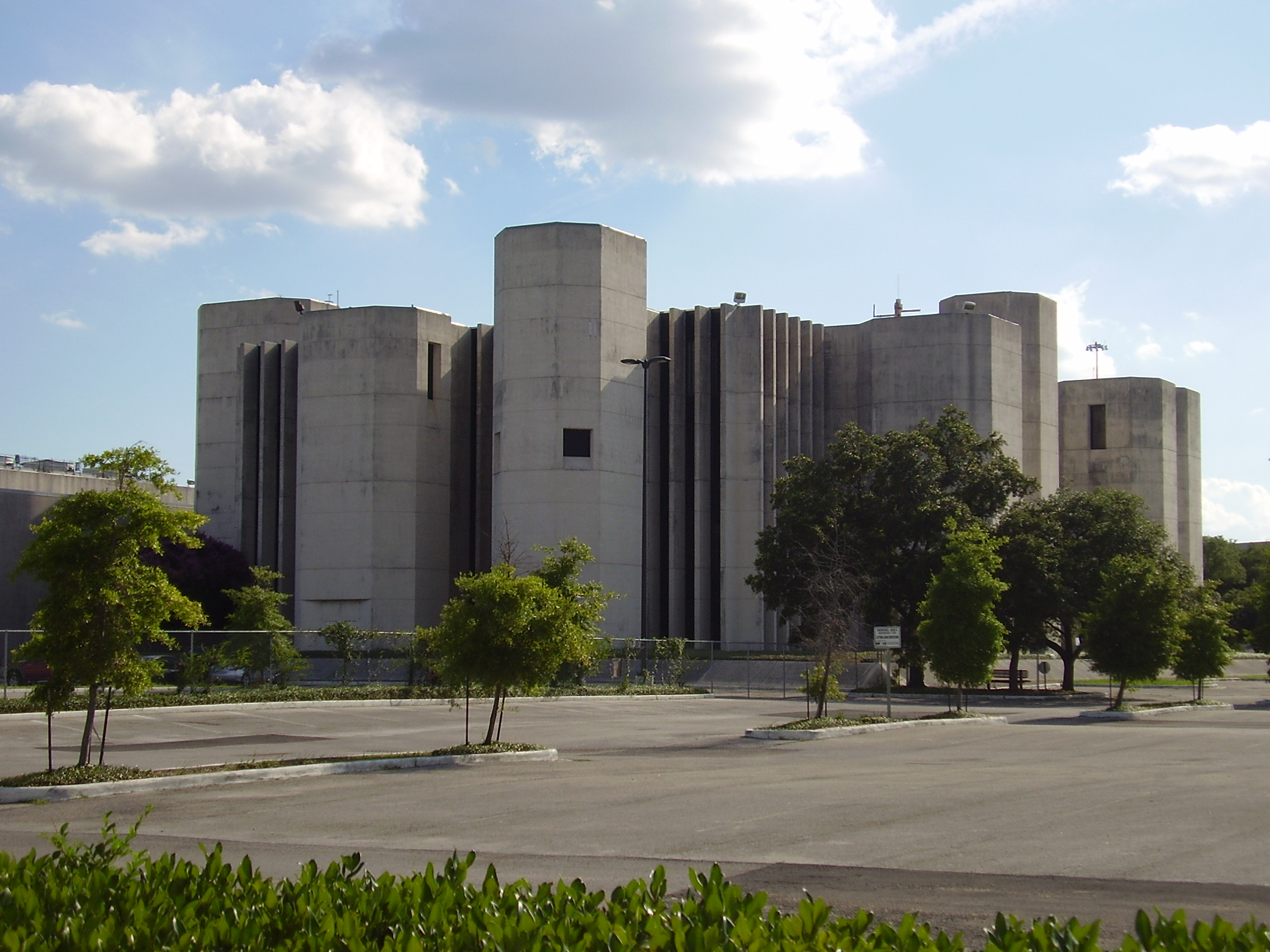
Houston Chronicle plant, former headquarters of the Houston Post

The Houston Post was a newspaper that had its headquarters in Houston, Texas, United States. In 1995, the newspaper shut down, and its assets were purchased by the Houston Chronicle.

== History ==
Gail Borden Johnson founded the Houston Post on February 19, 1880. He expanded the paper by acquiring the Houston Telegraph, the legacy of the Telegraph and Texas Register, which operated the first press in Texas after the Texas Revolution. By 1884, however, the paper was financially distressed, when William R. Baker led a group of investors to bail out the publication. Despite their efforts, the original publication ceased in October 1884. The Houston Post was re-established with the merger of the Houston Morning Chronicle and the Houston Evening Journal on April 5, 1885. J. L. Watson was the business manager and Rienzi M. Johnston was the editor. Watson implemented the use of linotype machines to replace the process of manual typesetting. He gained financial control of the paper through acquiring more stock in the company.

Short story writer O. Henry worked briefly for the Post in 1895 and 1896. He had to leave his position at the Post when he was indicted for embezzlement from previous employment at a bank in Austin.

Ross S. Sterling bought the Post in 1924 and merged it with the Houston Dispatch to form the Houston Post-Dispatch. Involved in this transaction was former Texas governor William P. Hobby, who was made president of the newspaper. Sterling built the Houston Post-Dispatch Building (which later became the Magnolia Hotel) for the paper in 1926; it was briefly the tallest building in the city. The title of the publication reverted to The Houston Post in 1932.

After Hobby acquired a controlling stake in the Post in 1939, his family owned the paper for the next four decades. Amid declining sales, the Post was sold in 1983 to the Toronto Sun. H&C Communications was created in the aftermath of the sale for the Hobby family to retain control of the broadcasting assets that consisted of TV stations across the U.S., especially local NBC affiliate KPRC-TV, and radio station KPRC (AM). Four years later, MediaNews Group, led by William Dean Singleton, bought the paper.

The Houston Post building, in the 1970s, had contemporary artwork, slate floors, and wood-grain concrete walls. Tours of the building and its facilities were given at the time.

The Houston Post later closed permanently, with the final edition printed on April 18, 1995. Its assets and liabilities were acquired by Hearst Corporation, the publisher of the Post's rival daily Houston Chronicle. The Hearst Corporation acquired the Houston Post headquarters, which included the newspaper's printing facilities and five offset press lines. Hearst began to use the facilities as part of the production of the Houston Chronicle. Houston Chronicle newspapers were distributed to former Houston Post subscribers. The facility now serves as a Houston Chronicle plant and the headquarters of the Houston Chronicle Spanish newspaper La Voz de Houston.

== Final sale ==
The Hearst Corporation, parent company of the Houston Chronicle, bought out the Houston Post from Consolidated Papers, Inc. on April 18, 1995, ending a 94-year-old crosstown rivalry. Hearst shut the paper down, reportedly for the purpose of eliminating local competition for readership and advertisers. The former owners cited the increasing cost of newsprint, which they had expected to rise up to $39 million from $26 million the previous year. The Houston Post reported an average daily circulation of over 287,000 that year, with a Sunday circulation of almost 317,000. The Houston Post did not announce the sale of the paper in its final edition on April 18.

== Availability of Houston Post articles ==
Some Houston Post articles had been made available in the archives of the Houston Chronicle website, but by 2005 they were removed. The Houston Chronicle online editor Mike Read said that the Houston Chronicle decided to remove Houston Post articles from the website after the 2001 United States Supreme Court decision in New York Times Co. v. Tasini. Difficulties complying with the terms of the decision caused the paper to take the entirety of the archives down.

The Houston Public Library's collection includes both the 1880–1995 newspaper archives and the 1976–1994 Houston Post Index on microfilm. The 1880–1900 archive is in the Texas and Local History Department of the Julia Ideson Building, while the 1900–1995 archive is in the Jesse H. Jones Building.

The University of Houston's library collection contains the 1880–1995 archive and the 1976–1979 & 1987–1994 index on microfilm.

The National Endowment for the Humanities has online searchable past issues from 1893 to 1903.

The Dallas Public Library has the archive, covering February 23, 1881–June 1884, March 1887–December 1906, and June 1977–March 1995.

Online archives of the Houston Post are available in GenealogyBank and Newspapers.com via paywall.

== Gallery ==
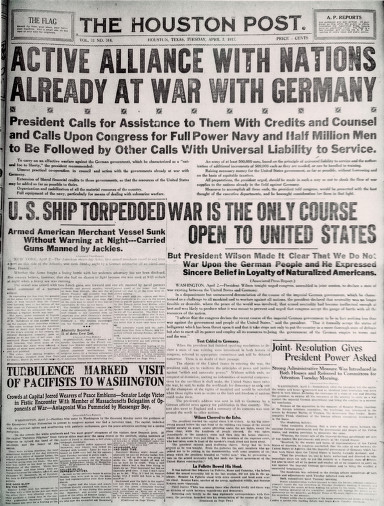
Front page of the Houston Post on April 3, 1917

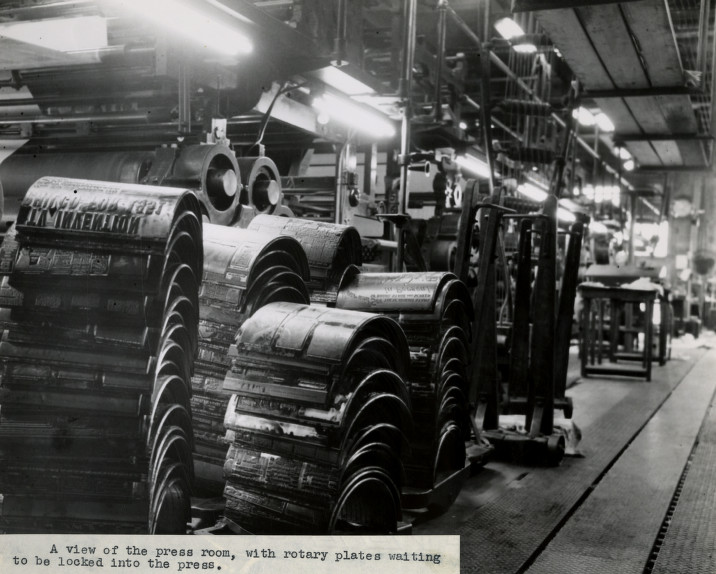
A view of the press room, with rotary plates waiting to be locked into the press

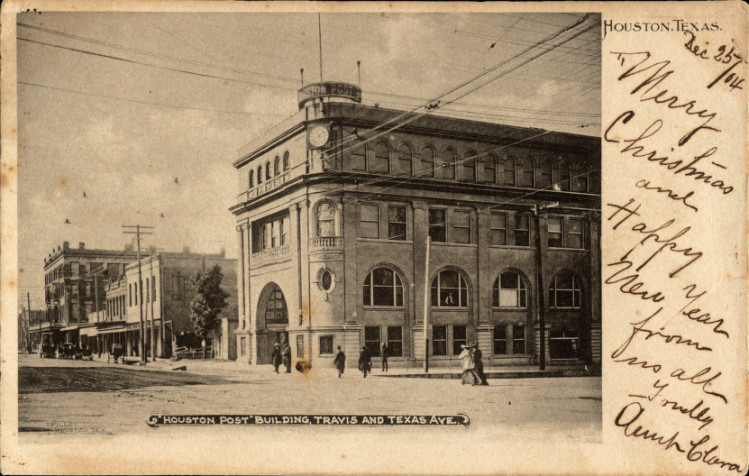
Houston Post Building, Houston, Texas (postcard, circa 1904)

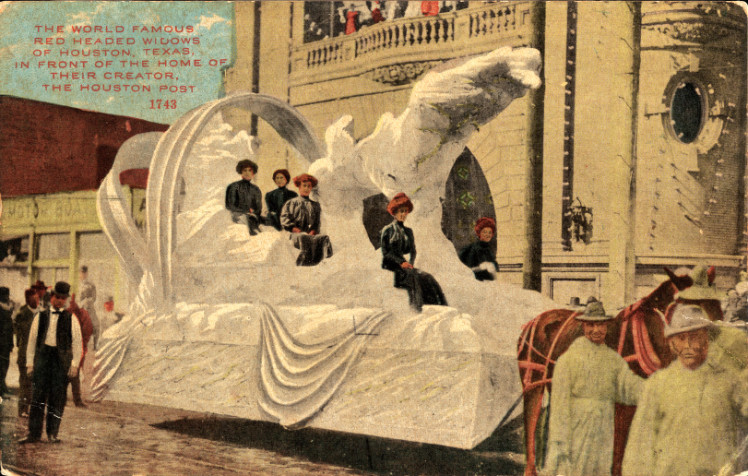
World Famous Red Headed Widows, Houston, Texas (postcard, c. 1909)

== See also ==
- Dan Cook
- Leon Hale
- Mickey Herskowitz
- Marjorie Paxson
- Phi Slama Jama
- List of newspapers in Texas
- Houston Post-Dispatch Building
