= Leon Hale =

American journalist and author (1921–2021)

- Born: Carol Leon Hale; May 30, 1921; Stephenville, Texas, U.S.
- Died: March 27, 2021 (aged 99)
- Education: Texas Tech University
- Occupations: Journalist; Writer
- Spouse: Babette Fraser
- Children: 2

Leon Hale (May 30, 1921 – March 27, 2021) was an American journalist and author. He worked as a columnist for the Houston Chronicle from 1984 until his retirement in 2014. Before that, he had a column in the Houston Post for 32 years. He was also the author of twelve books.

== Early life ==
Carol Leon Hale was born in Stephenville, Texas, on May 30, 1921. He was named after his mother, Leona; his father, Fred, worked as a travelling salesman who sold a machine that sealed parcels. Hale's family moved frequently during his childhood because of his father's employment, relocating to Fort Worth when he was seven years old before leaving for Eastland during the Great Depression. He suffered from polyostotic fibrous dysplasia that caused his face to be deformed. He attended Eastland High School, graduating in 1939.

Hale went on to study at Texas Tech University. He wrote for its student newspaper, The Toreador, authoring essays, columns, and opinion pieces. One of his instructors there, Alan Stroud, extolled Hale's writings but gave him D grades due to his poor spelling. An avid reader of the Horatio Hornblower novels, Hale attempted to join the US Navy and later the Marine Corps during World War II. However, he was rejected due to high blood pressure and the anomalous placement of his eye. He eventually enlisted into the US Army Air Corps; his 1941 training stint in Nebraska marked the first time he left his home state. He subsequently fought as a combat gunner in the European theatre, where he flew 50 combat missions. Hale played down his military career, claiming that he never "fir[ed] a shot at an enemy plane or g[ot] as much as a skinned finger". He later recounted how a shell once hit his plane; although it did not explode, it left a gaping hole in the wing.

Upon his return from military service in 1945, Hale went back to Texas Tech and obtained a bachelor's degree in journalism the following year. A position at the Lubbock Avalanche-Journal was extended to him, but he declined due to the $20-a-week salary. His father then advised him to leave Abilene, where their family had moved to, worrying that Hale "might get stuck" if he remained. Hale consequently relocated to Houston in 1947.

== Career ==
Hale secured a job at the Houston Post in 1952. He thrived in this work environment, with his colleagues observing how he was a writer who rarely required revision. He also published his first novel, Bonney's Place, in 1972. It gained a cult following, and the film rights changed hands six times. Even though four screenplays were drafted, no movie had been produced by the time of Hale's death.

Hale published an anthology of his selected works for the Post in 1983, appropriately titled Easy Going. Although he was attracted to revise his columns, he ultimately opted not to. He worked at the paper until mid-1984 when he was offered a place at the Houston Chronicle. He proceeded to author a memoir in the form of a story titled Paper Hero (1986), in which he discussed how his personal life influenced his work.

Hale was a member of the Texas Institute of Letters, a literary group in Austin, which recognized the writer with the Lon Tinkle Award for Excellence Sustained Throughout a Career. He also won awards for fiction and non-fiction from the Headliners Foundation, United Press International, and the Associated Press.

Hale retired in 2014 after 65 years of writing. He opined how he had "stayed at the party long enough. Maybe even a little too long." Despite his retirement, he continued to write short blog entries weekly for the Chronicle. His twelfth and final book, See You Down the Road, was published in March 2021, shortly before his death.

== Personal life ==
Hale's first two marriages ended in divorce. He met his third wife, Babette Fraser, in 1981. They resided in Houston and Winedale, Texas, and remained married until his death.

Hale died on March 27, 2021, at the age of 99.

== Books ==
Hale was also the author of the following twelve books:

- Turn South at the Second Bridge (1965)
- Bonney's Place (1972)
- Addison (1978)
- A Smile from Katie Hattan (1982)
- Easy Going (1983)
- One Man's Christmas (1984)
- Paper Hero (1986)
- Texas Chronicles (1989)
- Home Spun (1997)
- Supper Time (1999)
- Old Friends: A Collection (2004)
- See You On Down the Road, A Retirement Journal (2021)
