= La Voz de Houston =

Spanish weekly newspaper in Houston, Texas

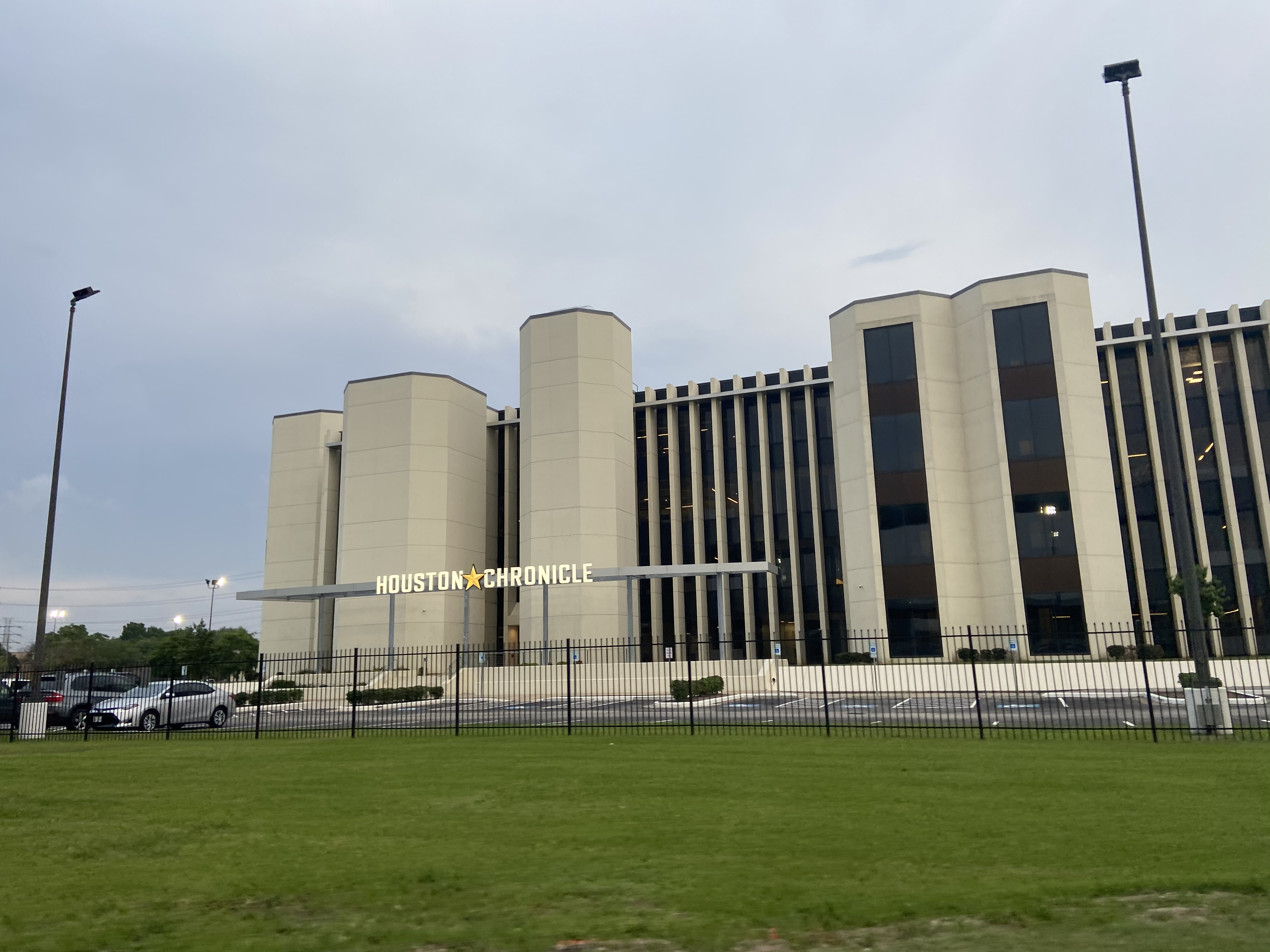
Houston Chronicle plant and headquarters, which houses the headquarters of La Voz de Houston

La Voz de Houston (Spanish: "The Voice of Houston") is a Spanish-language weekly newspaper distributed by the Houston Chronicle, and a subsidiary of the Houston Chronicle. The newspaper's offices are located in the Houston Chronicle's newspaper production plant at the 610 Loop and U.S. Route 59 (Southwest Freeway). This plant is the former Houston Post headquarters. Before the Chronicle acquisition, the paper was published by the La Voz Publishing Corp., headquartered in Houston.

== History ==
Armando and Olga Ordóñez, refugees from Cuba, established La Voz de Houston in 1979. The couple used a small house as the newspaper's offices. Armando and Olga wrote articles and operated the paper, while their children, Carlos and Laura, helped produce La Voz. Armando Ordóñez died in 1984, so Olga Ordóñez became the sole owner of the paper. Under her leadership La Voz de Houston gained a circulation of 100,000. 35,000 of the circulation consisted of copies that were distributed on Wednesdays to subscribers of the Houston Chronicle. Before the acquisition by the Houston Chronicle, La Voz de Houston had 14 employees. For a 13-year period before the 2004 acquisition, La Voz and the Houston Chronicle were in a partnership. The Chronicle distributed and printed La Voz and the Chronicle sold advertisements and shared some stories.

On Thursday December 2, 2004 the Houston Chronicle purchased La Voz. Ordóñez remained as the publisher of La Voz. As an employee of the Houston Chronicle she began reporting to Jack Sweeney, the publisher of the Houston Chronicle. The 14 employees of La Voz de Houston became Houston Chronicle employees. The offices of La Voz de Houston moved to their current location. With the sale, La Voz began to receive advertising sales and editorial support from the Chronicle.

== Content ==
The newspaper is written in a standard mainstream Spanish so that Hispanics of many national backgrounds can easily understand the content. As of 2004 the weekly newspaper has a circulation of 100,000. The newspaper's sections include news, food, sports, and entertainment.

== See also ==
- List of Spanish-language newspapers published in the United States
