= Cuisine of Houston =

Various cuisines in Houston, Texas

This article discusses the various cuisines in Houston, Texas.

== History ==
In 1899, there were about 48 restaurants in Houston, with over 33% serving a cuisine other than Anglo-American.

Houstonians began to dine out for pleasure more commonly in the 1950s.

In 1998, Jerry Shriver of USA Today referred to Houston as "the people's dining-out capital" of the United States. As of 1998 Houstonians ate out at restaurants more often than residents of other American cities, and Houston restaurants have the second lowest average prices of restaurants of major cities.

Tory Gattis, who published op-eds in the Houston Chronicle, said in 2005 that Houston has "a great restaurant scene." Gattis said that one factor contributing to the status is Houston's ethnic diversity, related to Houston's role as a major city of the energy industry, Houston's role as a port city, and Houston's proximity to Latin America and the Cajun areas of adjacent Louisiana. Gattis cited Houston's lack of zoning, which makes it easy for a business owner to start a restaurant as land is less expensive and there are fewer regulations and permitting rules. Gattis also cited Houston's freeway network, which, according to Gattis, puts restaurants within a 15-20 minute drive within the residences of most Houstonians during non-rush hour times. Gattis explained that the size of Greater Houston's population allows the city to support niche ethnic restaurants and provides a large customer base for area restaurants. Also he stated that the competition in Houston's restaurant industry forces restaurants of lower quality to go out of business, leaving high quality restaurants open. The journalist explained that Houston's relatively low cost of living reduces labor costs for restaurants and allows its residents more leftover income that could be spent at restaurants. Jobs in Houston have relatively high salaries, Gattis explains that the wages help support Houston's restaurant market.

As of 2010, many food truck vendors are frequently forced to close by city regulations, and Katharine Shilcutt of the Houston Press stated that food truck vendors have difficulties obtaining licenses. A nonprofit organization called "Save Our Food Trucks" started to assist food truck vendors in navigating the municipal bureaucracy.

By 2019, food halls became prominent in Houston, though Greg Morago of the Houston Chronicle stated that year that this was not the first time the concept existed in the city.

In 2022, the oldest still operating restaurant in Houston was Christie's Seafood and Steaks, established by an ethnic Greek man who originated from Istanbul.

== Ethnic enclaves reflecting national cuisines ==
- Bissonnet - Filipino, Nigerian, Ethiopian, African American
- Briar Meadow - Iranian, Lebanese, Arab
- Chinatown - Chinese, Vietnamese, Japanese, Korean
- Denver Harbor - Mexican
- East Downtown - Chinese (Old Chinatown)
- Gulfton - Salvadoran, Honduran, Mexican
- Little Saigon - Vietnamese
- Second Ward - Mexican
- Spring Branch - Korean, Salvadorian, Mexican
- Little India/Mahatma Gandhi District - Indian, Pakistani
- Meyerland - Jewish
- Midtown - Vietnamese
- NRG Park/Texas Medical Center area - Filipino
- Third Ward - African-American, Louisiana Creole, West Indian, West African

Ethnic enclaves in Greater Houston outside the city limits

- Galveston - Italian
- Katy - Venezuelan
- Sugar Land - Indian, Chinese
- Missouri City - Filipino

== Tex-Mex cuisine ==
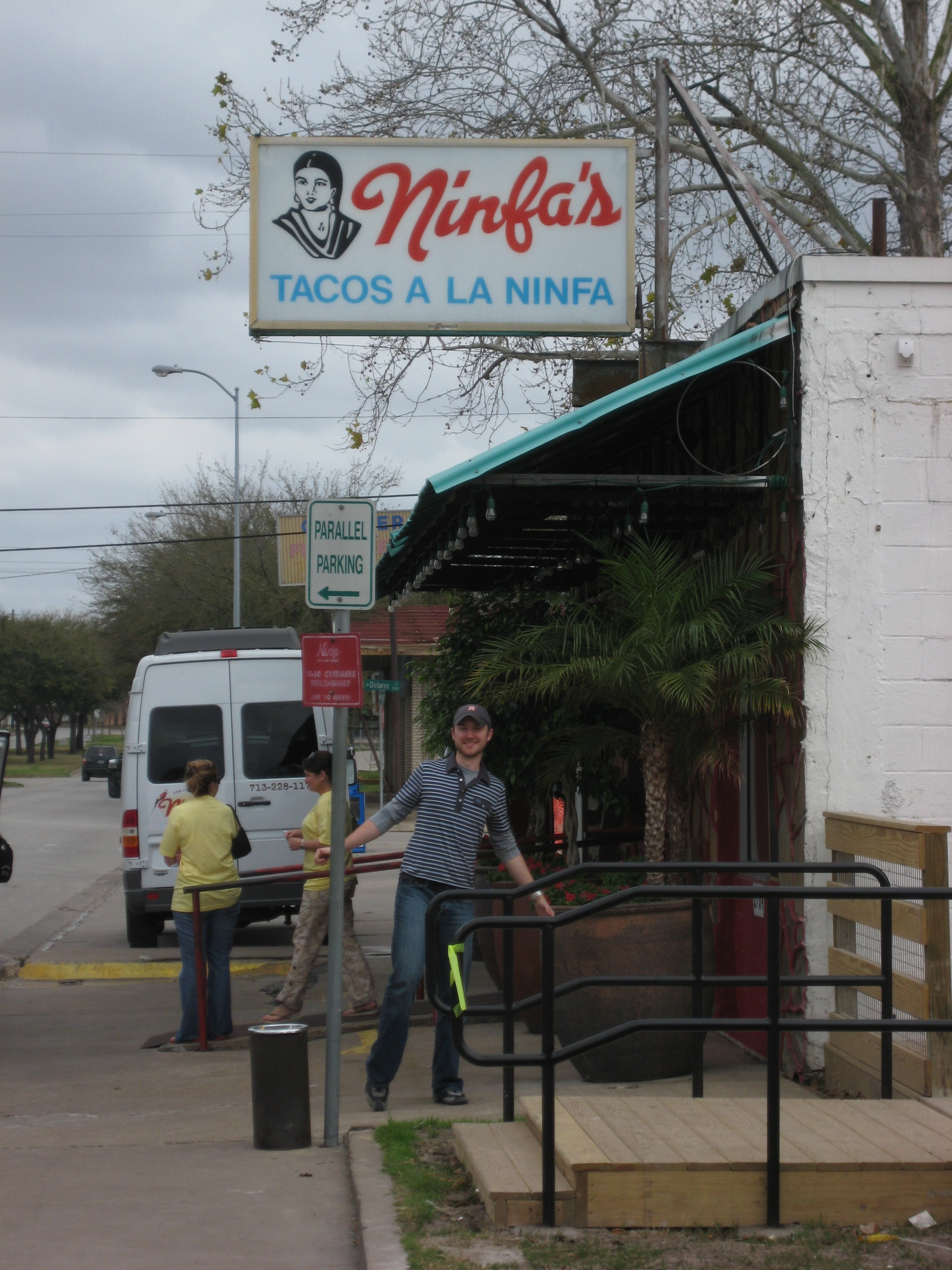
The original Ninfa's

Tex-Mex cuisine is very popular in Houston. Many Mexican cuisine restaurants in Houston have aspects that originate from Texas culture. In his book Ethnicity in the Sunbelt: A History of Mexican Americans in Houston, Arnoldo De León said that the recent immigrants from Mexico to Houston add foods that are popular with immigrants to menus of Mexican restaurants in Houston. Robb Walsh of the Houston Press said "You might say that the immigrant flow is what keeps the "Mex" in Tex-Mex." In Houston, as in other places in Texas, the existing Chicano community influences the cooking methods used by recent immigrants.

== Louisiana Creole cuisine ==
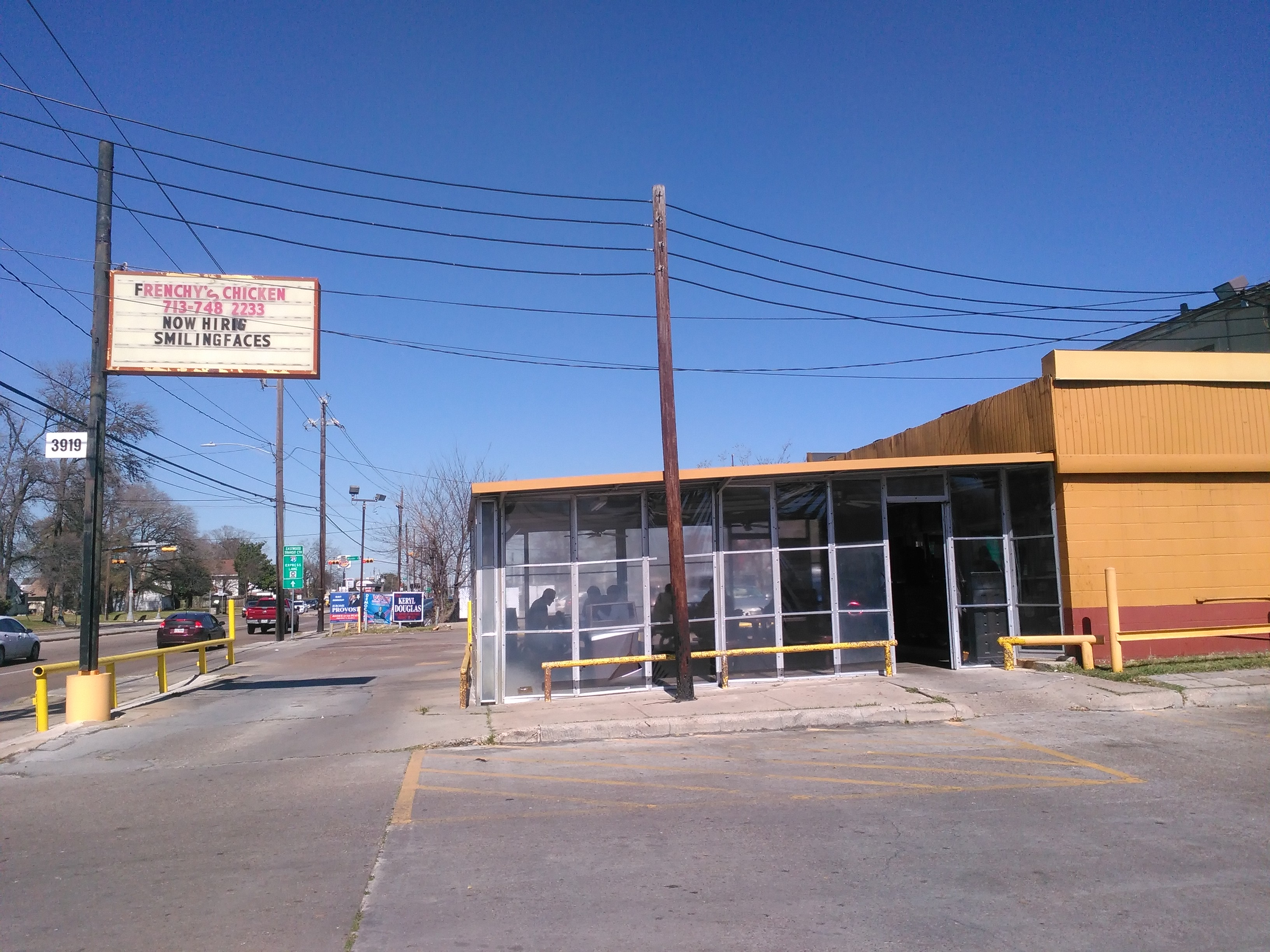
The original Frenchy's Chicken in the Third Ward, Houston

The Louisiana Creole people who settled in Houston around the 1920s brought their cuisine with them and often sold the food. The cuisine style spread in Houston in the post-World War II era. Because of the post-World War II increase, various chains in the Houston area sell Creole food, including Frenchy's Chicken, Pappadeaux, and Popeyes. Creole food items include boudin, black rice and shrimp creole, crawfish, gumbo, and jambalaya. Bernadette Pruitt, author of The Other Great Migration: The Movement of Rural African Americans to Houston, 1900-1941, wrote that Creole cooking became "an important cultural bridge" in the city and in its African-American community, and that "As cooks, Creole housewives transformed Houston's typical southern cuisine."

== Vietnamese cuisine and Vietnamese-operated restaurants ==
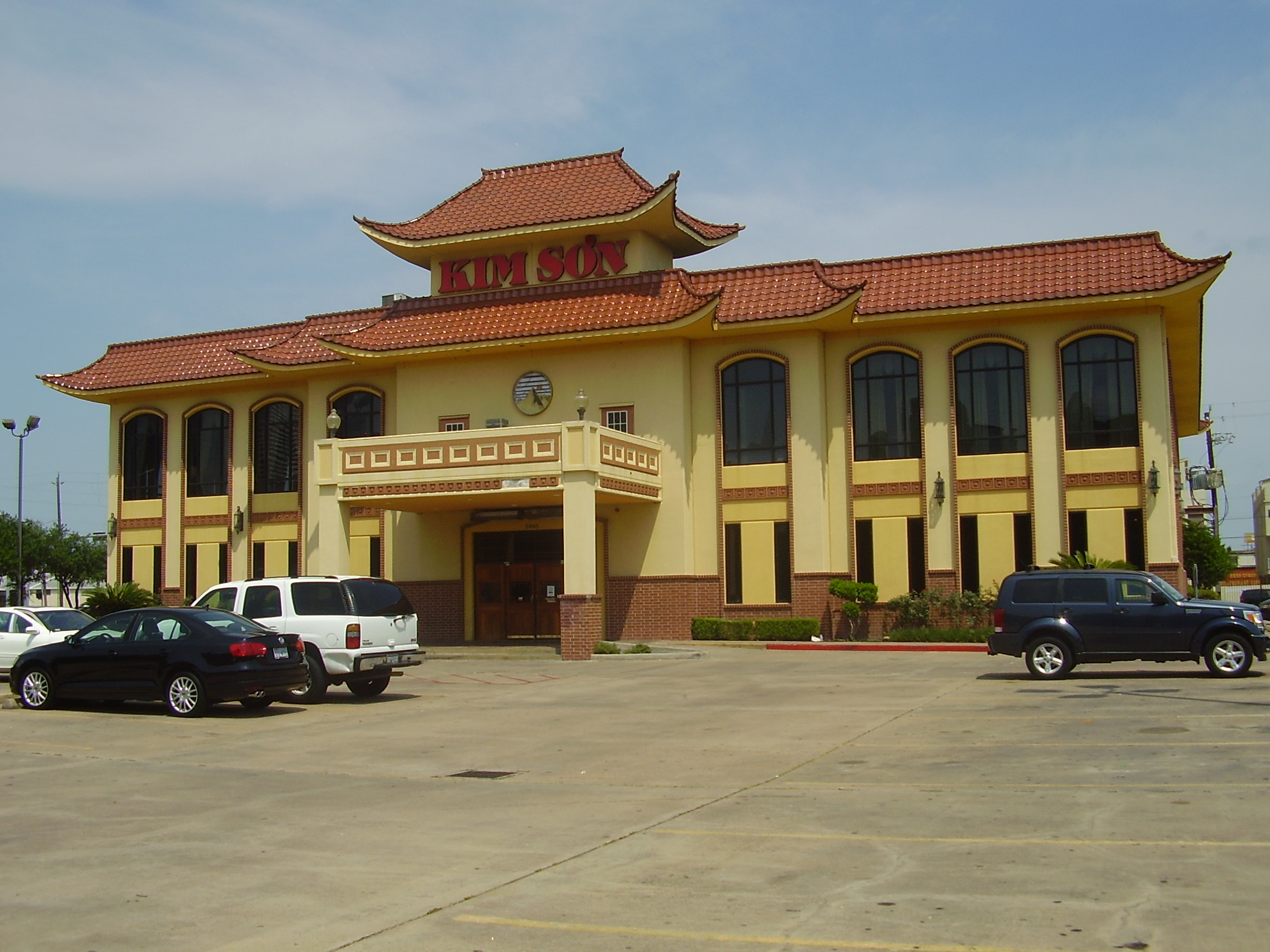
Kim Sơn in East Downtown

The presence of Vietnamese immigrants lead to the development of Vietnamese restaurants throughout Houston. Some establishments from Vietnamese restaurateurs offer Vietnamese-style crawfish, a mixture of Louisiana cuisine and Vietnamese cuisine. This combination of Vietnamese seasoned and Louisiana cajun crawfish is termed "Vietnamese-Cajun" or "Viet-Cajun" in the early 2010s. Viet-Cajun differs from Louisiana cuisine by seasoning crawfish on the outside and inside of their shells, whereas Louisiana cuisine only flavors the interior.

Houston has many "you buy, we fry" seafood restaurants. Most of the "you buy, we fry" restaurants in Houston are operated by Vietnamese immigrants and Vietnamese Americans. Carl Bankston, an associate professor of Asian studies and sociology at Tulane University, said in 2004 that ethnic Vietnamese are disproportionately employed in fishing, seafood processing, and shrimping in the Gulf Coast area. Around 1974 Vietnamese immigrants began coming to the Gulf Coast to work in the shrimping industry, therefore many ethnic Vietnamese worked for related industries in Texas. African Americans tend to be the main clientele of Houston's "you buy, we fry" fish restaurants. As of 2004 the Third Ward, an African-American neighborhood, has the city's highest concentration of "you buy, we fry" restaurants.

== Barbecue ==
According to J. C. Reid of the Houston Chronicle, the area within Beltway 8 had over 100 barbecue establishments. The first new-style "craft barbecue" restaurants of the 2010s were established in the 610 Loop in 2011, and much of the subsequent expansion came to areas north and south of that. Reid stated in 2018 that expansion of barbecue establishments into Greater Katy came recently. That year he stated "northwest Houston has a legitimate claim to being the most active neighborhood for barbecue." In 2016 Reid stated that distances between barbecue establishments in Houston are greater, due to urban sprawl, compared to such establishments in Austin, and therefore it is easier for news media organizations to give coverage to Austin barbecue than Houston barbecue. He added that restaurants in Houston face less competition than Austin ones due to the distances between one another.

Beef brisket was available commercially beginning in the 1900s, declined due to wartime rationing in World War I, and by the 1960s became a regular menu item.

== Po' boy ==
Houston has its own variety of the po' boy, with chowchow added to ham, salami and provolone cheese, traditionally served cold. The sandwich is currently known as the "Original Po' Boy" and was previously the "regular". There is also a version with added meats and cheeses called the "Super". Stephen Paulsen of the Houston Chronicle stated that the "Original" variety is "in the city's food DNA, the Shipley Do-Nuts of sandwiches."

It was developed by Lebanese American Jalal Antone, owner of Antone's Import Company in the Fourth Ward, in 1962 after his brother-in-law stated that area residents at the time would not be accustomed to Levantine cuisine, and therefore the business needed to be openly focused around more familiar cuisine. John Lomax of Houstonia described the 1970s and 1980s as the height of their popularity and that the growth of chain sandwich shops that operated across the United States, the introduction of banh mi, and the poor quality of third-party sandwiches in gas stations resulted in a decrease in popularity for the variety. Lomax in particular stated that the storage of the sandwiches at grocery stores ruined the flavor due to the delicate properties of the chowchow and mayonnaise. In 2002, 40 percent of the sandwiches sold at Antone's were the "Original" variety.

== Middle Eastern cuisines ==
As of 2008, multiple Houston-area restaurants selling Levantine cuisine also served sandwiches. This trend started with Jalal Antone, who in the 1960s/1970s advised Levantine businesspeople that American people at the time would consider Levantine cuisine to be too foreign, so it would make more business sense to open a sandwich shop that also sells Levantine dishes on its menu.

== Chinese American cuisine ==
As of 2022, the longest-operating Chinese American restaurant in the city is China Garden (Chinese: 華園酒家; Jyutping: waa4 jyun4*2 zau2 gaa1) in Downtown Houston. China Garden was originally founded in 1969 on what is now Polk Street and Avenida De Las Americas, before moving to the corner of Crawford Street and Leeland Street in the late 1970s.

== Japanese cuisine ==
Some Japanese restaurants in Houston are owned by persons of Japanese backgrounds, although the majority are not. There was a restaurant named Tokyo Gardens which stopped operations in 1998; Erica Cheng of the Houston Chronicle wrote that during the period it was active, it "was Houston’s premier Japanese restaurant". According to the owner of Nippon, a restaurant in Montrose which opened in 1986, Japanese baseball players who are in the Houston area went to that restaurant. Nippon closed in 2024. Some Japanese restaurants in Houston were previously owned by persons of Japanese heritage but were later sold to other owners.

== Vegan ==
By 2020, Houston had a group of vegan restaurants. According to Emma Balter of the Houston Chronicle most of the vegan restaurants she chronicled, in a list that was "comprehensive, yet not exhaustive", were owned by African-Americans, and races other than non-Hispanic white owned an "overwhelming majority".

== Notable Houston restaurants ==
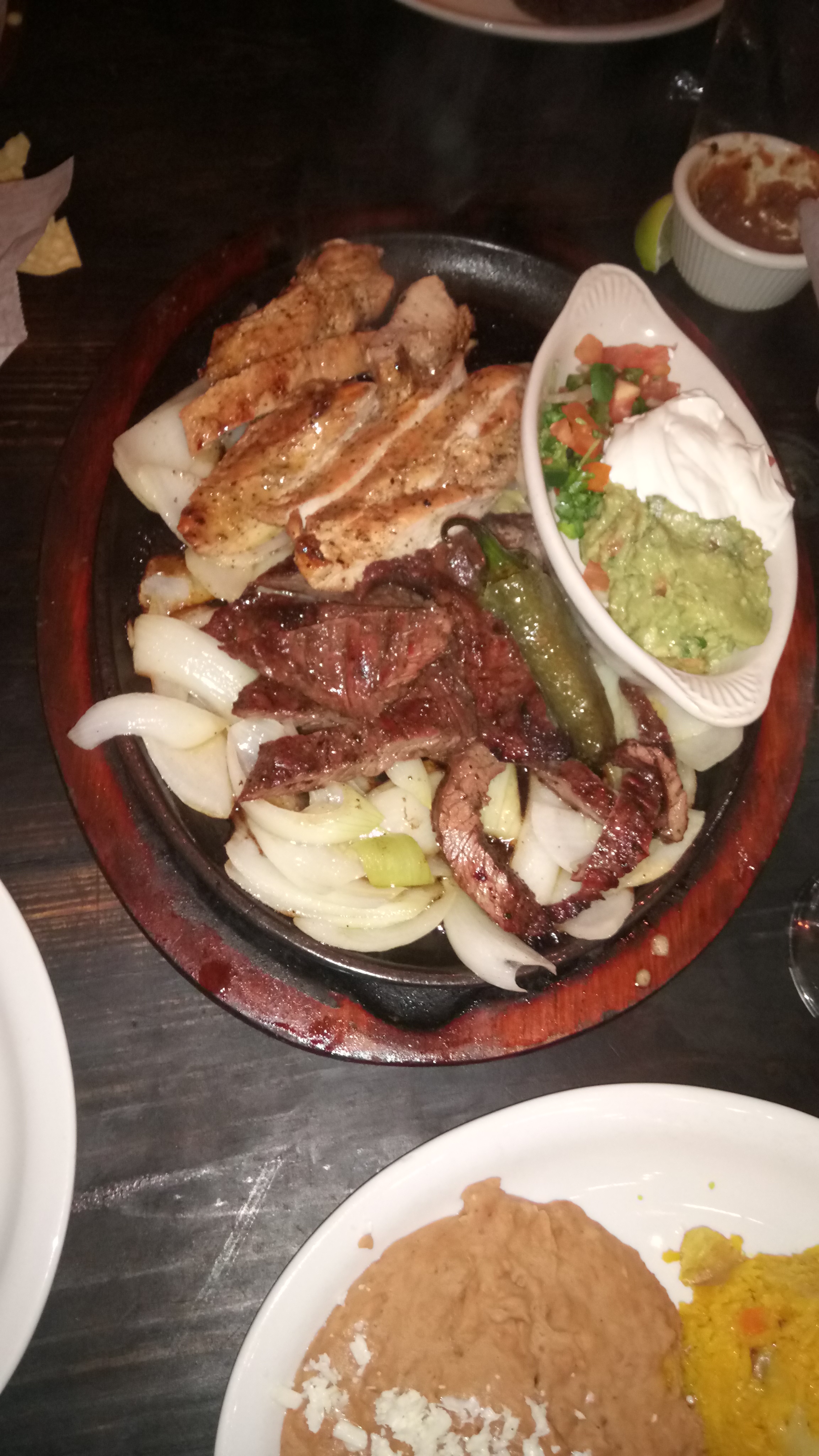
Original Ninfa's tacos al carbón/fajitas, Second Ward

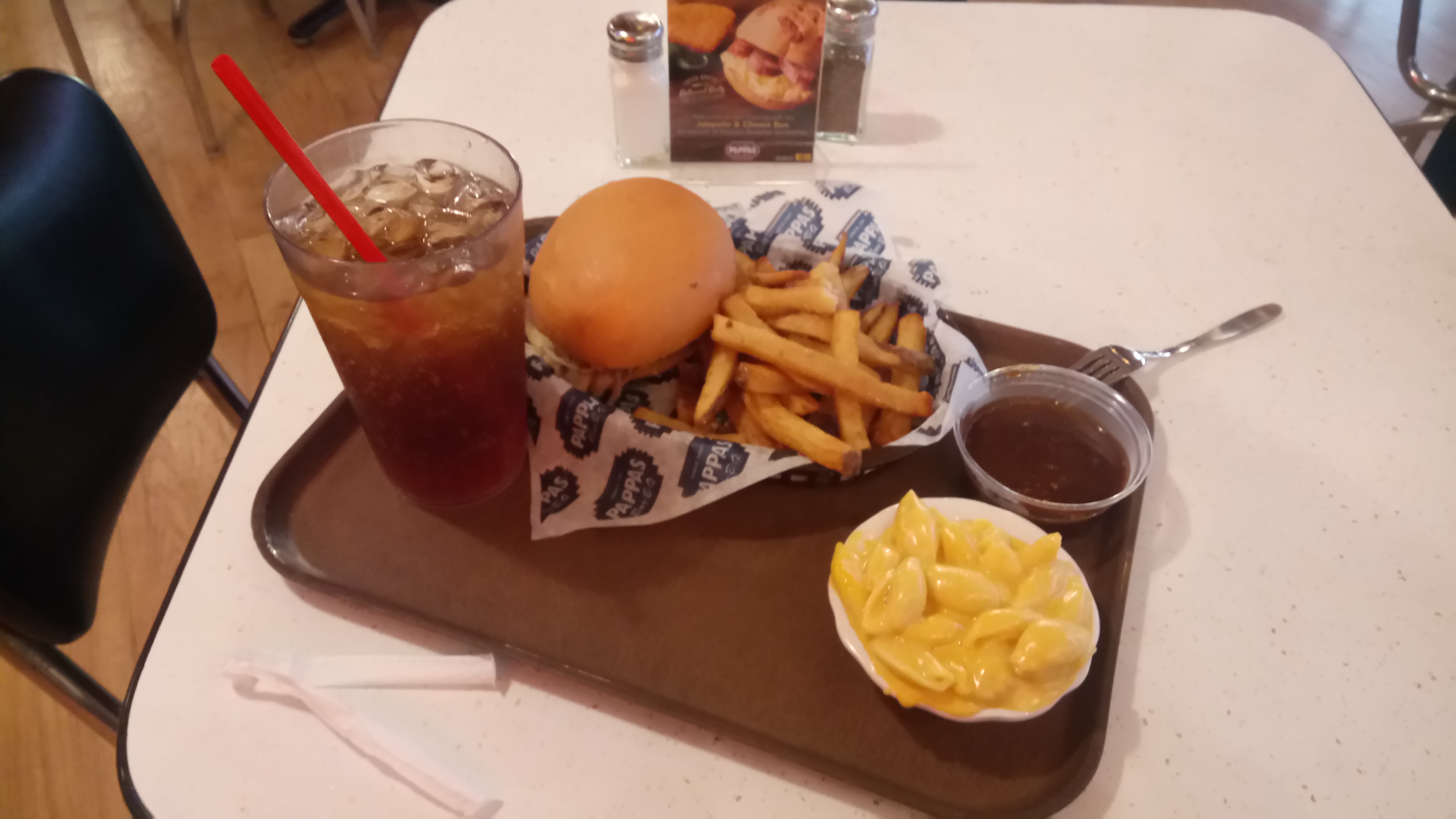
Barbecue sandwich dinner from Pappa's Barbecue in Downtown Houston

- Antone's Famous Po' Boys
- Bambolino's
- Becks Prime
- Blood Bros. BBQ
- Carrabba's Italian Grill
- Felix Mexican Restaurant
- Frenchy's Chicken
- James Coney Island
- Kim Sơn
- Landry's Restaurants
- Luby's
- Mai's
- Marble Slab Creamery
- Mexican Restaurants, Inc.
- Molina's
- Niko Niko's
- Ninfa's
- Pappas Restaurants
- Saltgrass Steak House
- Shipley Do-Nuts
- Two Pesos

== Notable persons ==
- Percy Creuzot
- Jim Goode
- Christine Ha
- Ninfa Laurenzo

== See also ==
- Cook Like a Local - Cookbook by Chris Shepherd based upon ethnic cuisine in Houston
