= Antone's =

Antone's may refer to:

- Antone's, a nightclub in Austin, Texas, started by Clifford Antone, nephew of Jalal Antone
- Antone's Famous Po' Boys, a sandwich shop chain in Houston, Texas started by Jalal Antone, uncle of Clifford Antone
- Antone's Records
