= Po' boy =

Sandwich originally from Louisiana

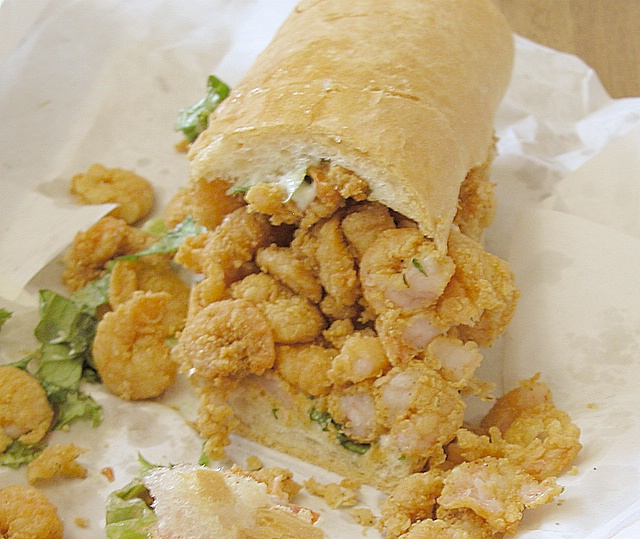
- A shrimp po' boy
- Alternative names: po-boy po boy
- Place of origin: New Orleans, Louisiana
- Region or state: American Deep South
- Main ingredients: Multiple
- Variations: Multiple

A po' boy (also po-boy, po boy derived from the non-rhotic southern accents often heard in the region, or poor boy) is a sandwich originally from Louisiana. It traditionally consists of a filling, which is usually roast beef, ham, or fried seafood such as shrimp, crawfish, fish, oysters, or crab on a New Orleans French bread roll cut lengthwise. This "po' boy bread" is known for its crisp crust and fluffy crumb.

== Preparation ==
A po' boy may contain a wide variety of fillings including roast beef, ham, fried shrimp, fried crawfish, fried catfish, Louisiana hot sausage, fried chicken, alligator, duck, boudin, and rabbit listed among possible ingredients.

"Po' boy bread" is a local style of French bread traditionally made with less flour and more water than a traditional baguette, yielding a wetter dough that produces a lighter and fluffier bread that is less chewy. The recipe was developed in the 1700s in the Gulf South because the humid climate was not conducive to growing wheat, requiring wheat flour to be imported and thus less available.

A "dressed" po' boy has shredded lettuce, sliced tomato, sliced pickles, and mayonnaise. Fried seafood po' boys can be dressed with melted butter and sliced pickle rounds. A Louisiana-style hot sauce is optional. Non-seafood po' boys will also often have Creole mustard.

Aside from meat and seafood, cheese has also been a recognized ingredient since the Great Depression, (Note: The Federal Writers' Project, The New Orleans City Guide cited by Cohen.) the sandwich's inception occurring at the beginning of that period (year 1929).

The fried oyster po'boys are also referred to by the distinct name "oyster loaf", and apparently have a different and older history.

In a New Orleans "sloppy roast beef" po' boy, thick cuts are served with gravy, or for the "CrockPot tender" type the beef is stewed down until melded with its sauce, while in a third style, thinner slices are dipped in beef jus. Garlic is an optional seasoning. Roast beef po' boys are commonly offered with "debris" (pronounced ['deɪ bɹi]), which is bits of meat that fall during cooking and are rendered into a near-gravy.

== Etymology ==
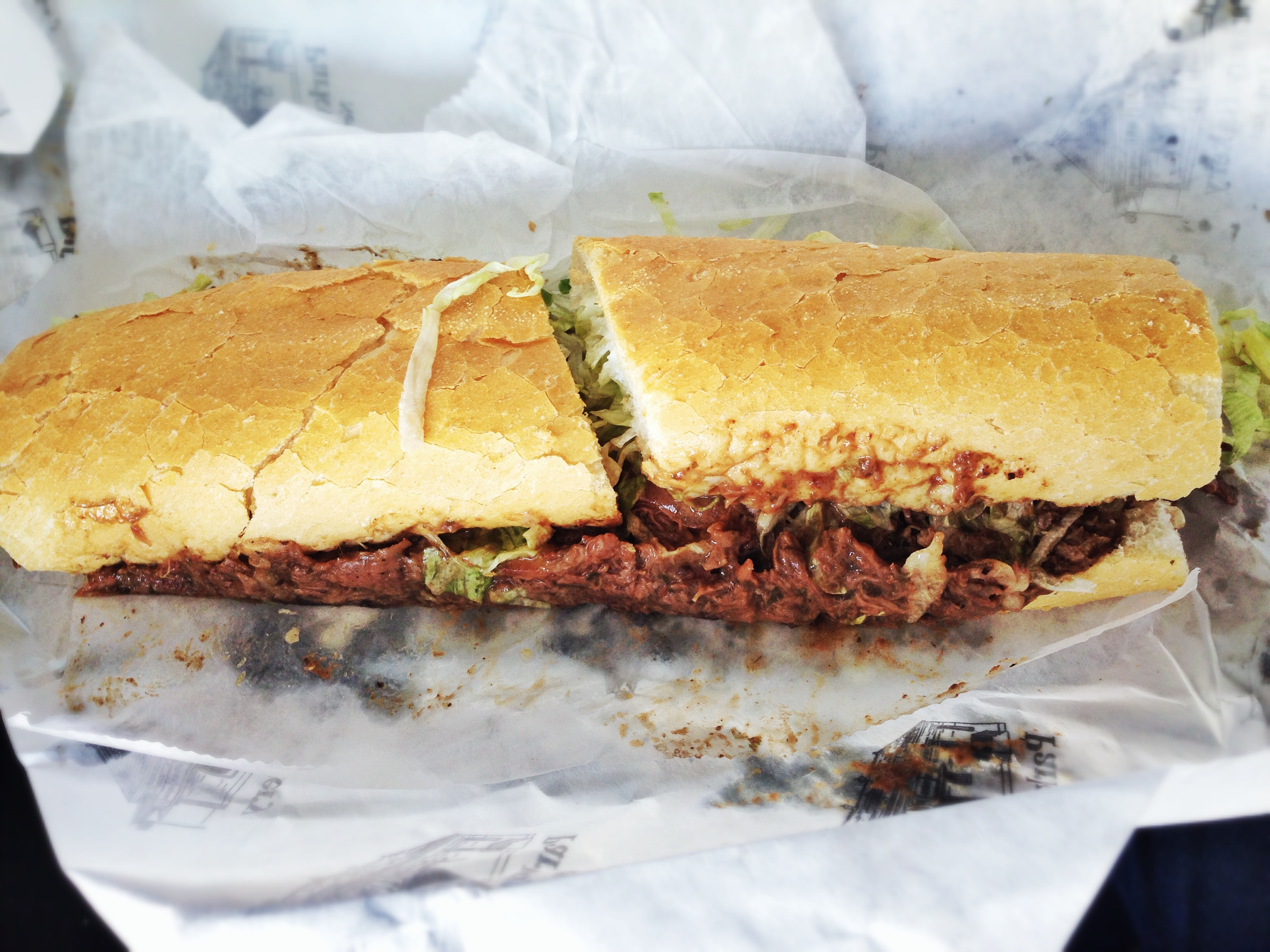
A roast beef po' boy

In the late 19th century, fried oyster sandwiches on French loaves were known in New Orleans as "oyster loaves", a term still in use. A sandwich containing both fried shrimp and fried oysters is often called a "peacemaker" or La Médiatrice.

A popular local theory claims that the term "poor boy" (later "po' boy", etc.), specifically referring to a type of sandwich, was coined in a New Orleans restaurant owned by Benjamin ("Benny") and Clovis Martin, former streetcar conductors originally from Raceland, Louisiana.

The Martins established their eatery in 1921. In 1929 the bakery of John Gendusa first baked the bread used for this sandwich. In 1929, during a four-month strike against the streetcar company, the Martin brothers served their former colleagues free sandwiches.

The Martins were interviewed on record regarding the origins of the sandwich. Benny Martin reminisced that they jokingly referred to an incoming diner as "another poor boy" if he turned out to be one of the strikers. The Martin brothers were asked the question of whether the name was inspired by some French or French patois word such as pourboire, but they denied that was the case.

One New Orleans historian finds the Martin claim suspicious for several reasons, starting with the fact that it was not described by the local press until 40 years after the strike, and that prior to 1969 the story from the Martin brothers themselves was that they had created the po' boy for farmers, dock workers and other "poor boys" who frequented their original location near the French Market. The Martin brothers wrote a letter, reprinted in local newspapers in 1929, promising to feed the streetcar workers, but it referenced "our meal" and made no mention of sandwiches.

== New Orleans ==
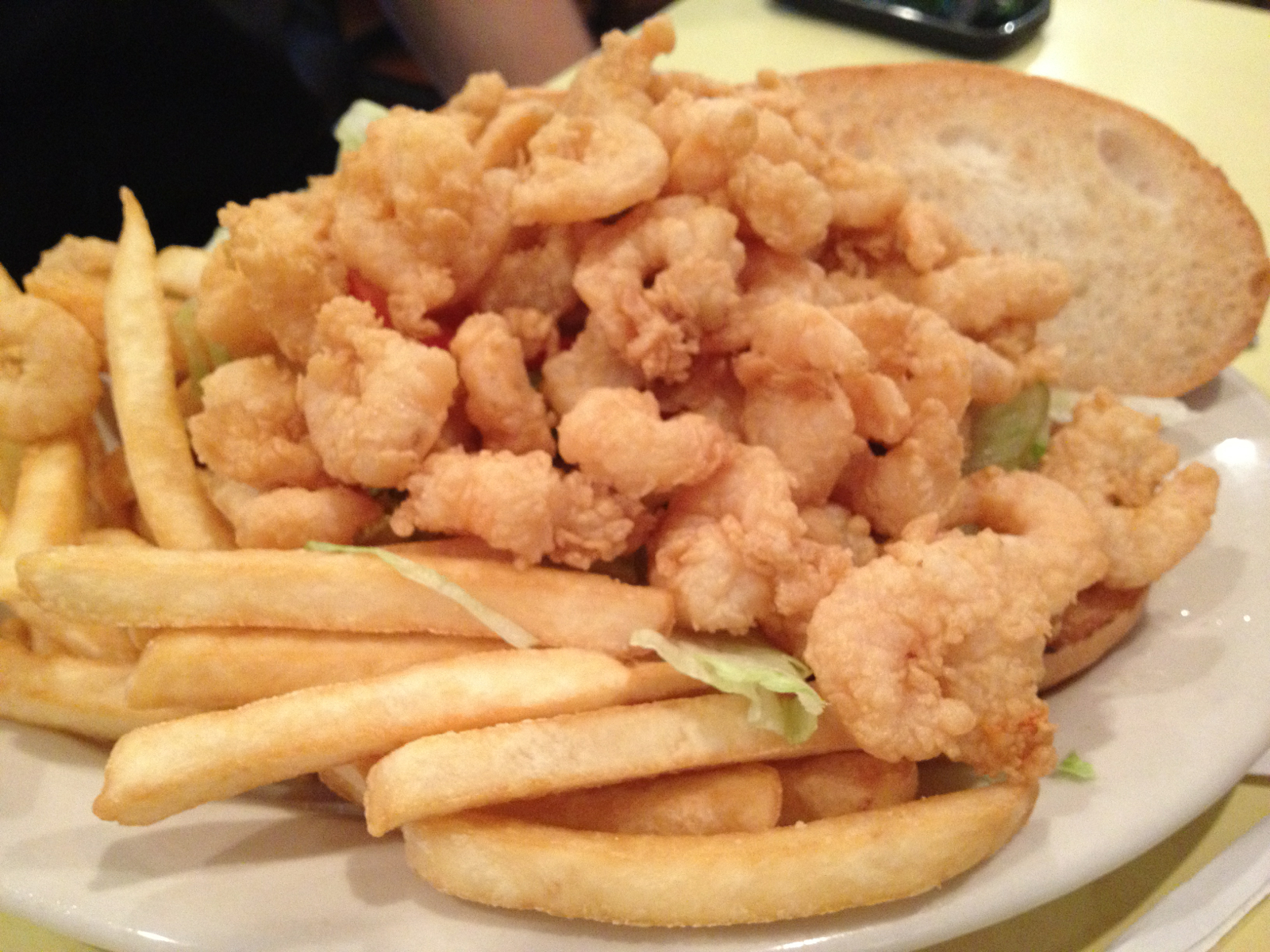
A fried shrimp po' boy at Middendorf's

New Orleans is known for its grand restaurants (see Louisiana Creole cuisine), but more humble fare like the po' boy is very popular. Po' boys may be made at home, sold pre-packaged in convenience stores, available at deli counters and most neighborhood restaurants. One of the most basic New Orleans restaurants is a po' boy shop, and these shops often offer seafood platters, red beans and rice, jambalaya, and other basic Creole dishes.

The two primary sources of po'boy bread are the Leidenheimer Baking Company and Alois J. Binder. There is fierce competition between po' boy shops, and resident opinions of the best po' boy shop varies widely.

Each year there is a festival in New Orleans dedicated to the po' boy, the Oak Street Po'Boy Festival. It is a one-day festival that features live music, arts, and food vendors with multiple types of po' boys. It is held in mid-November along a commercial strip of Oak Street in the city's Carrollton neighborhood. The festival gives "best-of" awards, which gives the chefs an incentive to invent some of the most creative po' boys.

== Variations ==
Authentic versions of Louisiana-style po' boys can be found along the Gulf Coast, from Houston through the Florida Panhandle. The term "po' boy" has spread further and can be found in the South Atlantic States and in California, where it may instead refer to local variations on the submarine sandwich.

Houston has its own variety of the po' boy, with chowchow added to ham, salami and provolone cheese, created in the 1960s and popularized by Syrian and Lebanese restaurateurs. Stephen Paulsen of the Houston Chronicle said the sandwich was "in the city’s food DNA, the Shipley Do-Nuts of sandwiches." It was first created by Lebanese American Jalal Antone, owner of Antone's Import Company in the Fourth Ward, in 1962 after his brother-in-law warned him that area residents at the time would not be accustomed to Levantine cuisine and the business should focus on something more familiar.

John Lomax of Houstonia described the 1970s and 1980s as the height of their popularity and that the growth of chain sandwich shops that operated across the United States, the introduction of bánh mì, and the poor quality of similar sandwiches in gas stations resulted in a decrease in popularity for the variety.

Vietnamese immigration to the Gulf South, including New Orleans, since the 1970s has led to some crossover between po' boys and bánh mì.

== See also ==
- 1929 New Orleans streetcar strike
- List of American sandwiches
- List of sandwiches
- Louisiana Creole cuisine
- Muffuletta
