= 1929 New Orleans streetcar strike =

New Orleans streetcar strike
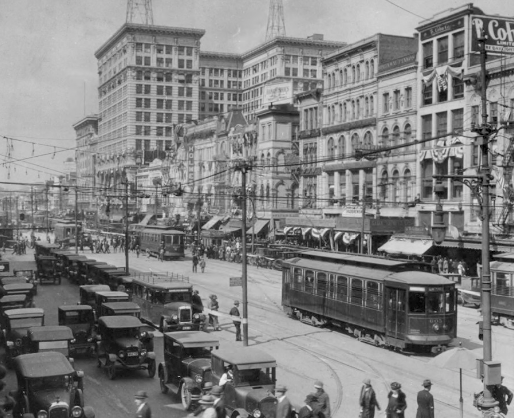
- 1926 New Orleans streetcar photo
- Date: July 1, 1929 - November 1929
- Location: New Orleans, Louisiana, United States
- Methods: Striking

Parties
Carmen’s Union, Division 194	New Orleans Public Service, Inc. (NOPSI)

Number
1,100 strikers	

Casualties and losses
At least 2 strikers killed Hundreds of strikers injured	

The 1929 New Orleans streetcar strike was a labor dispute between streetcar workers and the New Orleans Public Service, Inc. (NOPSI). Involving 1,100 workers, it began on July 1, 1929, and lasted over four months. It is credited with the creation of the po' boy sandwich. At one point a streetcar was burned by strikers.
