= Bambolino's =

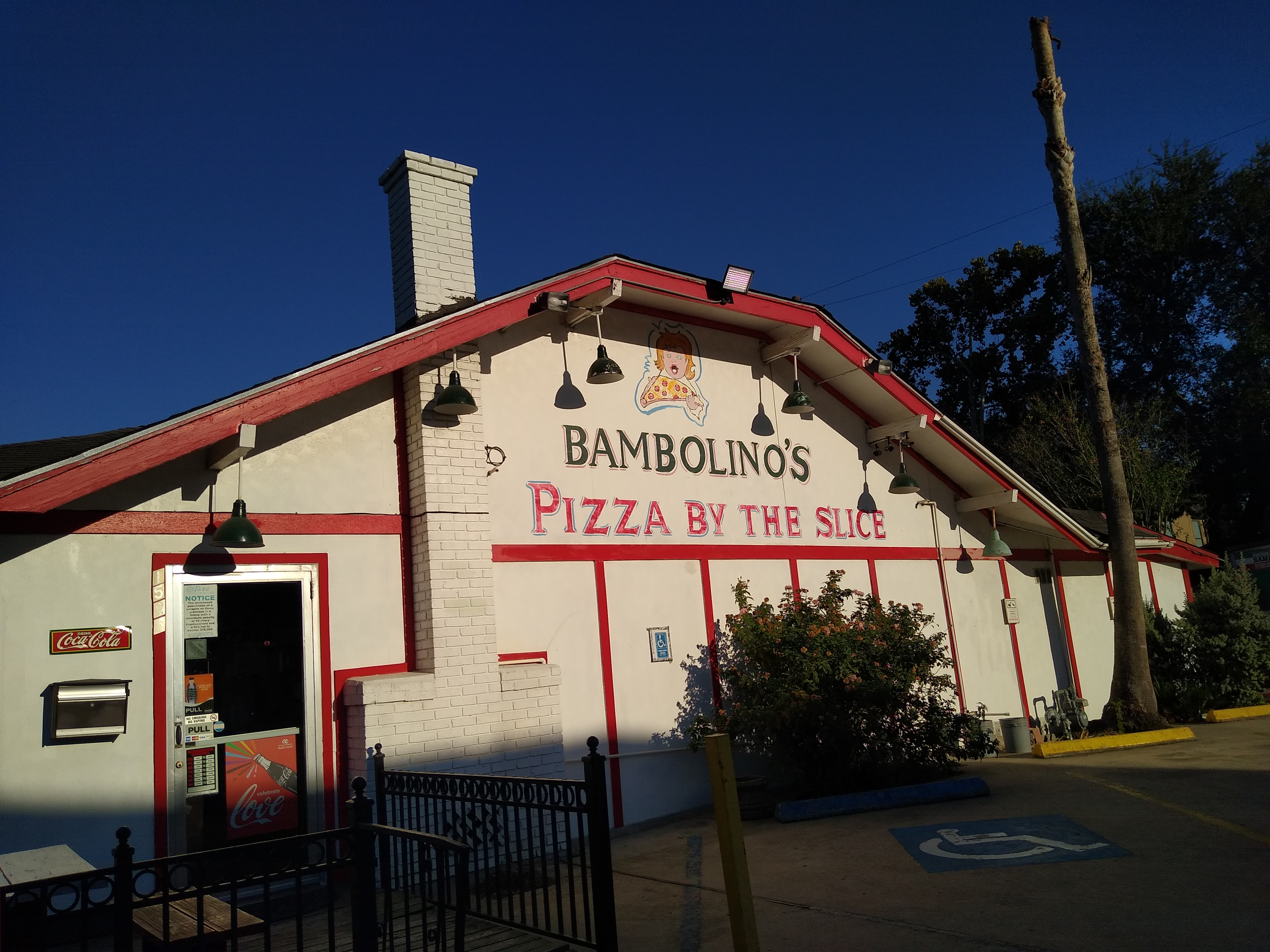
- Interactive map of Bambolino's

Restaurant information
- Established: 1987
- Location: Houston, Texas, United States
- Coordinates: 29.742640°N 95.398695°W

Bambolino's is an Italian American restaurant in Houston, Texas. The original Bambolino's Inc. restaurant chain was established by Ninfa Laurenzo and her family, who had established the Ninfa's restaurant chain. The original Bambolino's was controlled by the holding company RioStar Corp.

== History ==
Managers and investors of the Ninfa's restaurant chain established Bambolino's. Most of the funding came from the Ninfa's Inc. restaurants. When Bambolino's started, it raised $400,000 through a private placement of notes and an additional $160,000 through a debt-and-equity arrangement with MESBIC Financial Corp. Bambolino's was the Laurenzo family's second attempt in making an Italian-American restaurant. The first Bambolino's was scheduled to open on March 30, 1987 in Southwest Houston. The Laurenzo family hoped that the increasing trend of carry-out food would help the restaurant chain's success. The original Bambolino's was to be only serving carry out and drive through customers. Each location consisted of a group of portal spaces that could occupy 275 square feet (25.5 m^{2}) in two spaces in a standard parking lot. The president of Ninfa's and a son of Ninfa Laurenzo, Roland Laurenzo, said that this would allow a Bambolino's restaurant to make relatively few sales in order to break even.

In February 1987 the company elected D. Drue Pollan Jr. as the president, Leo J. Kelleher as the chief financial officer, and Joanne L'Abbate as the secretary-treasurer. The first restaurant opened in April 1987. It was the Ninfa's company's first restaurant established since the dissolving of the joint venture with McFaddin Ventures. In June 1987 Ninfa Laurenzo signed for the second location, at the intersection of Durham Drive and Washington Avenue. It was scheduled to open at the end of the month. In September 1987 Ninfa Laurenzo signed for the lease of the fourth location on Montrose Boulevard. In February 1988 the chain leased 14,654 square feet (1,361.4 m^{2}) of space to house its fifth location.

In 1989 and 1990, RioStar converted four Bambolino's locations into Ninfa's Cafe fajitarias. The first conversion occurred in November 1989, and the conversions of the other three occurred afterwards. Ten Bambolino's remained. In 1992 Houston Intercontinental Airport (now George Bush Intercontinental Airport) had two Bambolino's locations, with one in Terminal C and one in the Mickey Leland International Airlines Building (now Terminal D).

In 1996 one Bambolino's remained. In 1997 Bambolino's filed for bankruptcy. The Laurenzo family kept the rights to the name. Between the chain's opening and 1993, 17 Bambolino's restaurants had been in operation.

As of 2019, there is one franchised Bambolino's location in operation on 1525 Westheimer Rd. In 2011, the Laurenzo family opened a Bambolino's location on Airline Drive at the site that had housed their short-lived fast casual restaurant known as Chispas del Tiempo. Like the fast casual restaurant, the Bambolino's on Airline Drive remained in operation only briefly.

== Cuisine ==
The original Bambolino's had Italian items such as antipasto salad, lasagna, pizza, and spaghetti. Pizza slices were the signature item on the menu.

In regards to the Bambolino's on Montrose Boulevard, the individual slices are packed in cardboard boxes that absorb the grease. During that year Houston Chronicle columnist Ken Hoffman said, "That's precisely what I love about Bambolino's. You can buy slices. If I'm driving around, and I'm in the mood for pizza, I don't want to mess with a whole pie. I want a couple of slices. I want them hot. And I want them now. I don't want to wait 30 minutes. I don't want to tip some driver. I especially don't want my name, address and phone number entered in some pizza conglomerate's computer so Big Brother knows that I'm a sausage and green peppers guy." In addition to individual slices, the Montrose Boulevard Bambolino's sold entire pizzas and partially baked pizza slices.

In 1996 a single plain cheese pizza slice had a cost of $1.69, and a fully loaded double-wide slice such as the "Double Big House -The Works," which had bell peppers, Canadian bacon, hamburger, Italian sausage, jalapeños, mozzarella, mushrooms, black olives, pepperoni, and red onions. In regards to the flavor, Hoffman said in 1996 that "Bambolino's is surprisingly tasty pizza. I was expecting a lesser quality because Bambolino's is pretty much a fast-food hamburger joint that just happens to sell pizza. The dough has a sweet pastry flavor. The sauce is mild, and the cheese is the real deal. Bambolino's also heaps on the toppings. My Double Big House was about an inch tall. The mushrooms, et al., were so heavy that I had to eat my pizza with a knife and fork. And spoon."

Roland Laurenzo, the founder of the new Bambolino's, said, as paraphrased by Allison Wollam of the Houston Business Journal, that the pizza dough used to make the pizzas is "as spongy and airy, tender on the inside and crispy on the outside and made from scratch each day." The fresh-squeezed lemonade was a signature item on the menu of the old Bambolino's. In regards to the new Bambolino's, Laurenzo said "It’s our signature drink. It’s a frozen Lemonade — very tart, not too sweet, and it will give you a brain freeze when you drink it." The restaurant's "frozen lemonade" was delivered via a margarita machine. The restaurant sold the frozen lemonade by the glass, quart, and half gallon. Laurenzo also said that the chain would have a chicken fajita pizza.

== See also ==
- Cuisine of Houston
- Ninfa's
