= Kim Sơn (restaurant) =

American restaurant chain in Texas

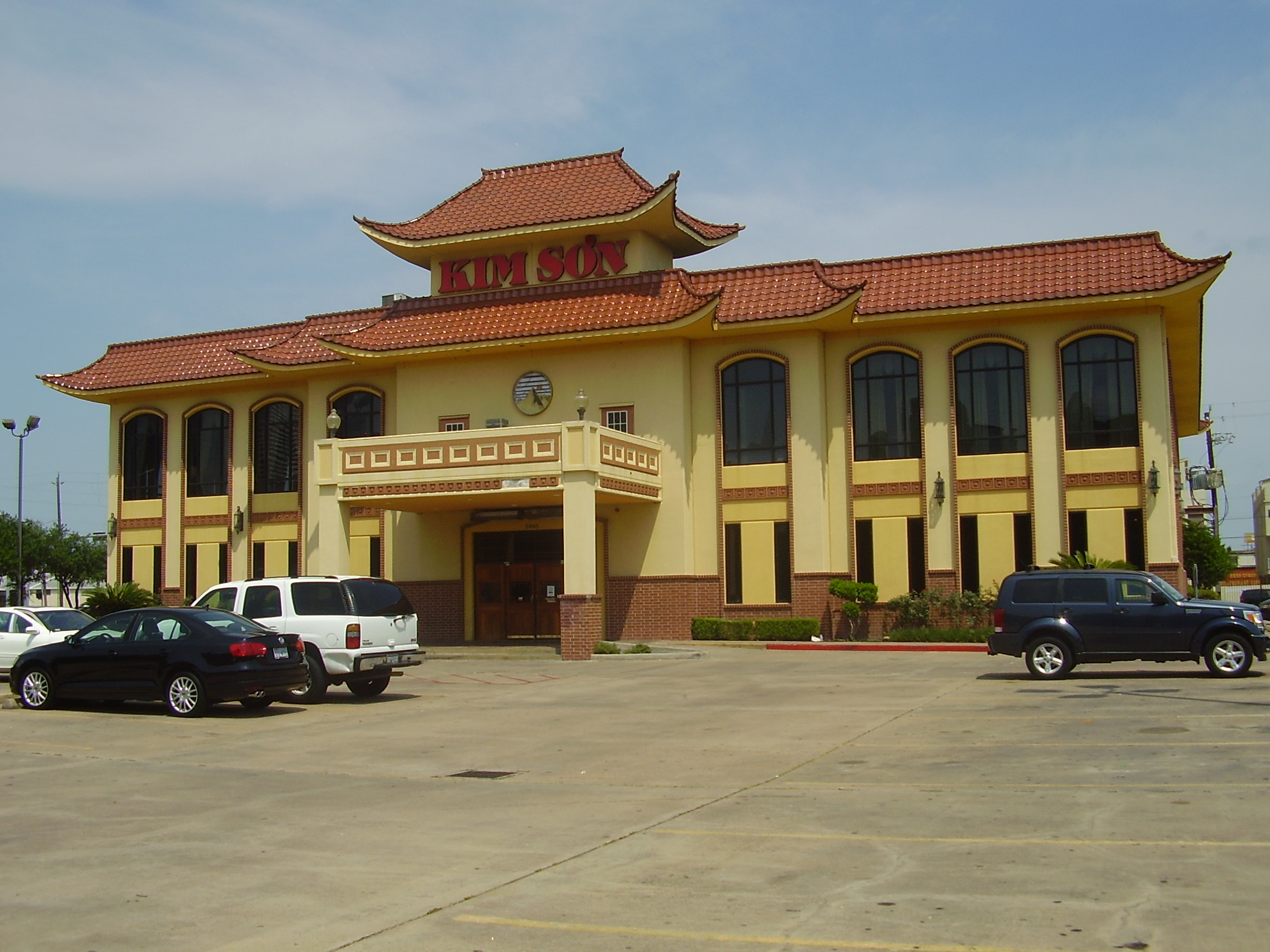
- Kim Sơn restaurant and headquarters in East Downtown
- Interactive map of Kim Sơn

Restaurant information
- Established: 1982
- Owner: Kim Su Tran La
- Head chef: Kim Su Tran La
- Food type: Vietnamese, Chinese
- Dress code: Casual
- Rating: 4.0 stars
- Location: 2001 Jefferson St, Houston, Harris, Texas, 77072, United States
- Coordinates: 29.745915°N 95.360374°W
- Seating capacity: 400-seat
- Other locations: 10603 Bellaire Blvd
- Website: kimson.com

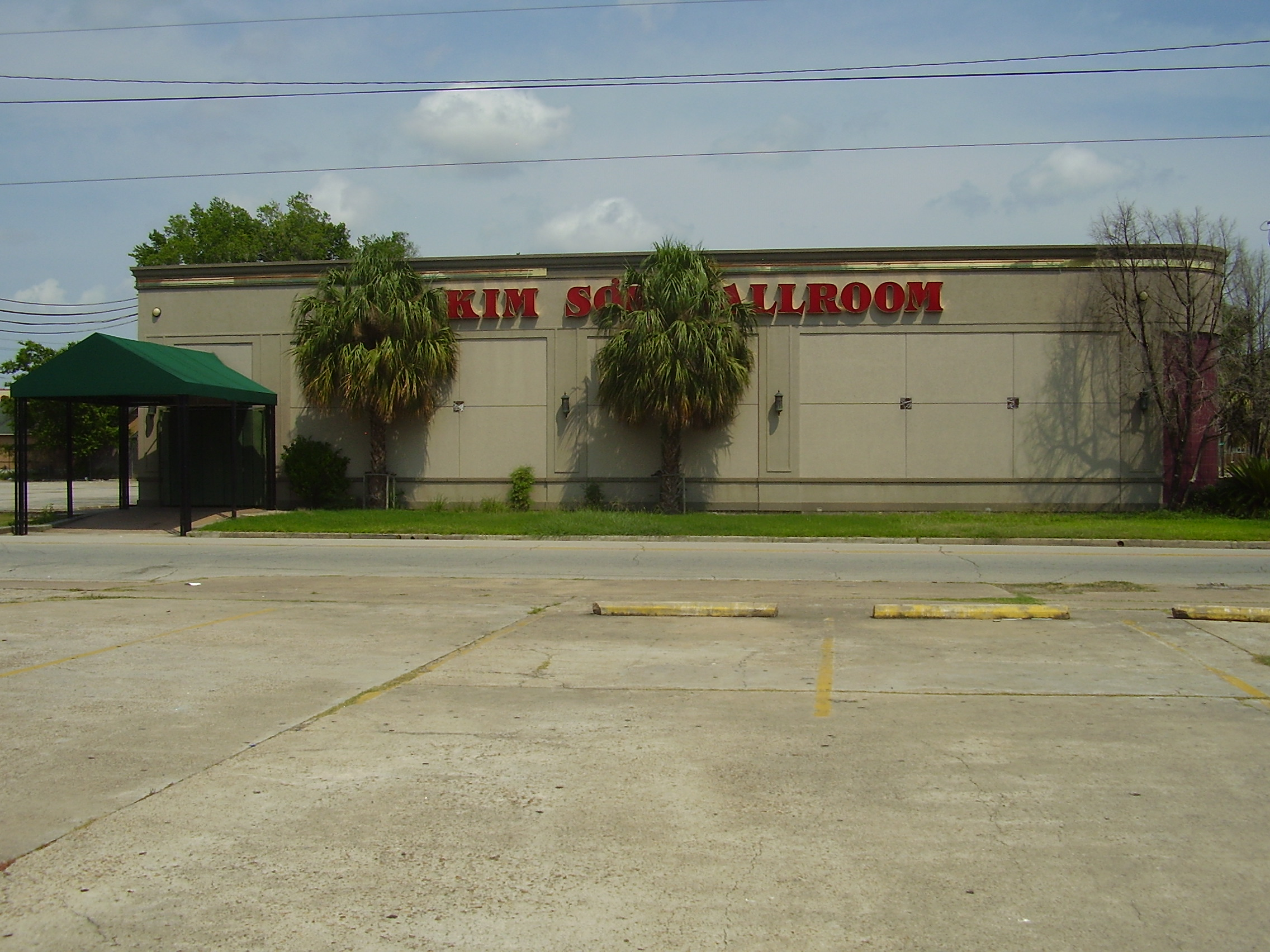
Kim Sơn Ballroom, East Downtown

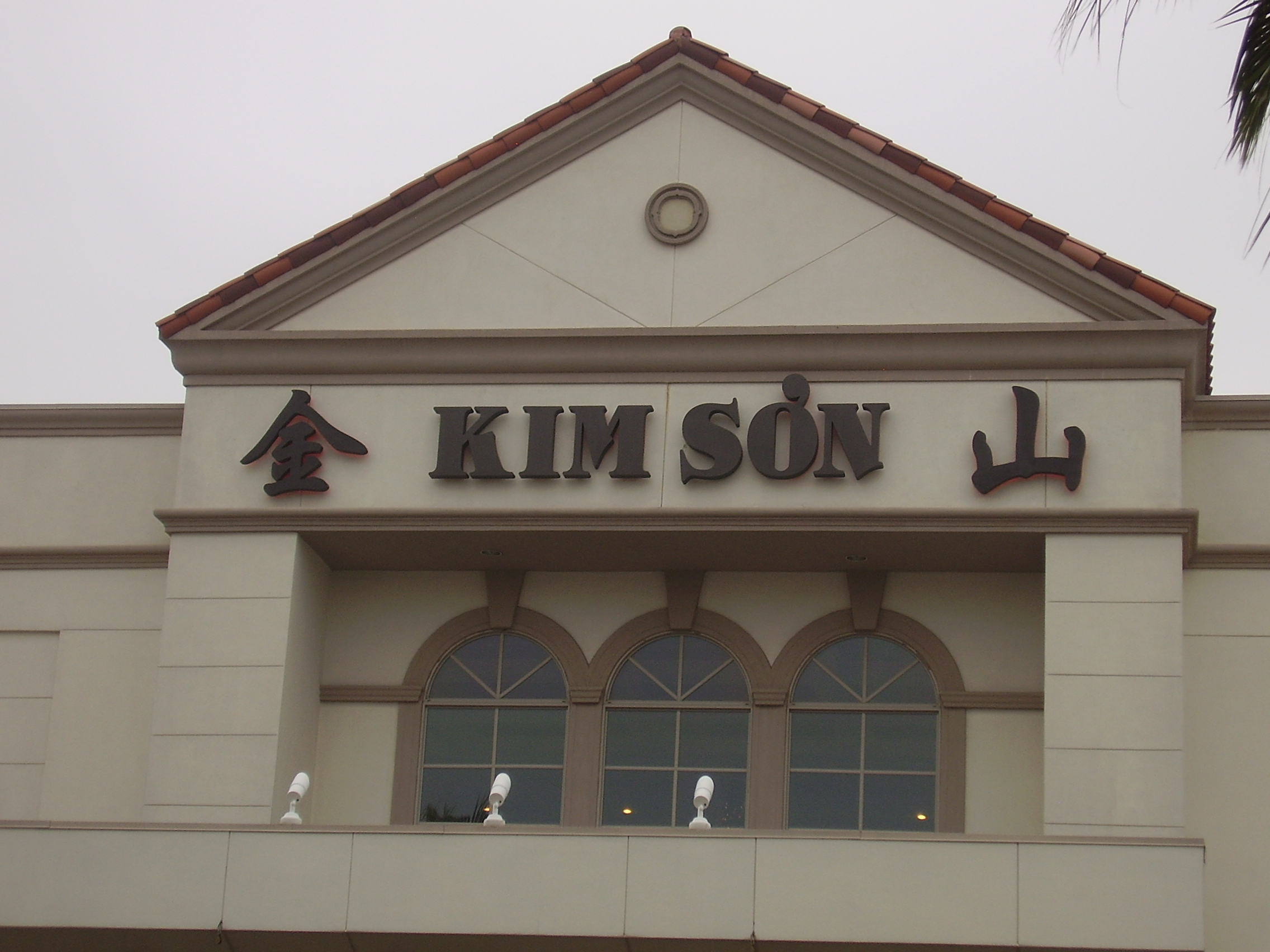
Kim Sơn in the Southwest Houston Chinatown

Kim Sơn (chữ Hán: 金山, Sino-Vietnamese for "Gold Mountain";) is a family-owned chain of restaurants in Houston, Texas, that serves both Vietnamese cuisine and Chinese cuisine. As of 2009 Tri La is the owner of the restaurant group. The restaurant group headquarters is in its East Downtown restaurant.

The restaurant Kim Sơn was originally founded in Vinh Long, Vietnam, by the Kim Su Tran La. Following the Fall of Saigon, when North Vietnam conquered South Vietnam, Kim and her family fled Vietnam in 1979 to Malaysia. In 1980, the family joined relatives already in the United States. On August 16, 1980, the family arrived in the United States by boat; pirates had attacked their group in the South Pacific during their voyage. The family re-established the restaurant in Houston's Downtown Chinatown in 1982. Kim and her husband Son oversaw all the restaurants with their seven children. Kim received vocational training at Houston Community College after arriving as a refugee.

== History ==
The restaurant has an extensive menu of Chinese and Vietnamese dishes and serves weekend dim sum. In 1993, the La family opened a new $2 million, 22,000-square-foot (2,000 m^{2}) restaurant and banquet facility diagonally across from the original location. At the time it was the largest Chinese restaurant in the state of Texas. A location existed at 7531 Westheimer at Hillcroft, but it has closed.

The success of the restaurant has led to the opening of two additional full-service restaurants; one located in Stafford, Texas, and the new 35,000-square-foot (3,300 m^{2}) restaurant and ballroom at Bellaire and Wilcrest Boulevards in Houston. Both new locations are in southwest suburbs that have thriving Asian communities. The company has also opened as several smaller outlets in Houston with limited menus called "Little Kim Sơn.". The chain has become one of the best known restaurants in the state of Texas and has received accolades from magazines such as Bon Appetit, Esquire, and Food & Wine. The September 1995 issue of Bon Appetit featured Kim Sơn in an article about ethnic restaurants in the United States. The October 1998 issue of Gourmet's reader's choice restaurant awards ranked Kim Sơn as having the "Best Value" in the Houston and New Orleans areas. (The New Orleans-area restaurant, established in Gretna on the West Bank of the Mississippi River in 1988 by Tina Dieu, closed in 2018.) In 2003 Kim Sơn was ranked as the "best other ethnic restaurant" in the Houston Business Journal. In 2002 the same restaurant took second place in the Houston Business Journal's rankings of the best Chinese restaurants.

In 2005, the La family opened Asia in conjunction with the new L’Auberge du Lac Hotel & Casino in Lake Charles, Louisiana. In 2008, the family opened another Asia in conjunction with Boomtown New Orleans in Harvey, Louisiana.

In 1995 Allison Cook of the Houston Press described Kim Sơn as the most prominent "success story as the Great Houston Restaurant Parable."

On September 24, 2023, the restaurant in Stafford closed.

In October 2025, the location in East Downtown closed as the facility will need to be cleared for more lanes for Interstate 45, leaving the Bellaire location as the chain's only operating location.

== See also ==
- Cuisine of Houston
- History of the Vietnamese-Americans in Houston
- Ninfa's (Houston-based Mexican-American restaurant chain)
- Frenchy's Chicken (Houston-based Louisiana Creole restaurant chain)
- List of Chinese restaurants
- List of Vietnamese restaurants
