= Cook Like a Local =

2019 cookbook by Chris Shepherd and Kaitlyn Goalen

- Author: Chris Shepherd, Kaitlyn Goalen
- Publication date: 2019

Cook Like a Local: Flavors That Can Change How You Cook and See the World is a 2019 cookbook by Chris Shepherd and Kaitlyn Goalen, published by Short Stack Editions. Jolie Soefer was responsible for the photography featured in the volume.

It is Shepherd's first cookbook.

Timothy Malcolm of Houstonia wrote that it is "a deep dive into the mind of" Shepherd and that it "reads like a 290-page summary of Shepherd’s career to this point." Jeremy Repanich of the Robb Report described the book as "an ode to his adopted hometown Houston".

== Background ==
Shepherd's inspiration came from eating ethnic cuisine in Houston, a city he moved to in 1995.

Circa 2015 Shepherd began writing the book and obtained representation from David Black Agency. Shepherd created recipes for this book specifically and did testing as part of the process of writing the book. He hired two chefs from the New York City restaurant Cosme, Estefania Brito and Josue A. Sanchez, to test the recipes. Soefer took the photographs in her studio. Shepherd put efforts into establishing the restaurant Georgia James which meant the release date of Cook Like a Local was changed to a later date. Shepherd got assistance from other Houston area restaurateurs, including Manabu "Chef Hori" Horiuchi.

Shepherd stated that he wanted the recipes to be relatively easy for ordinary people to use.

== Contents ==
The recipes in Shepherd's book are not exactly the same as those in the ethnic restaurants in Houston; Eater Houston stated that the recipes "are a product of the chef’s culinary ethos".

June Naylor of The Dallas Morning News states that the writing style uses "enthusiastic, accessible language".

There are six chapters; each chapter is by ingredient (chili peppers, corn, fish sauce, rice, spices, and soy), which differs from most cookbooks that organize by the course. Each chapter has an introductory text. Several dishes use food typical of the United States which is given a novel flair. Some recipes originate from other Houston area restaurants.

== Reception ==
Repanich wrote that the introductory texts of each chapter "interesting on their own". Repanich stated that the book pushed him "out of my comfort zone, but do a good job of guiding me to delicious food in the end."

== See also ==
- Cuisine of Houston
