= Ninfa's =

Mexican restaurant in Houston, Texas

Coordinates: 29°45′25″N 95°20′33″W

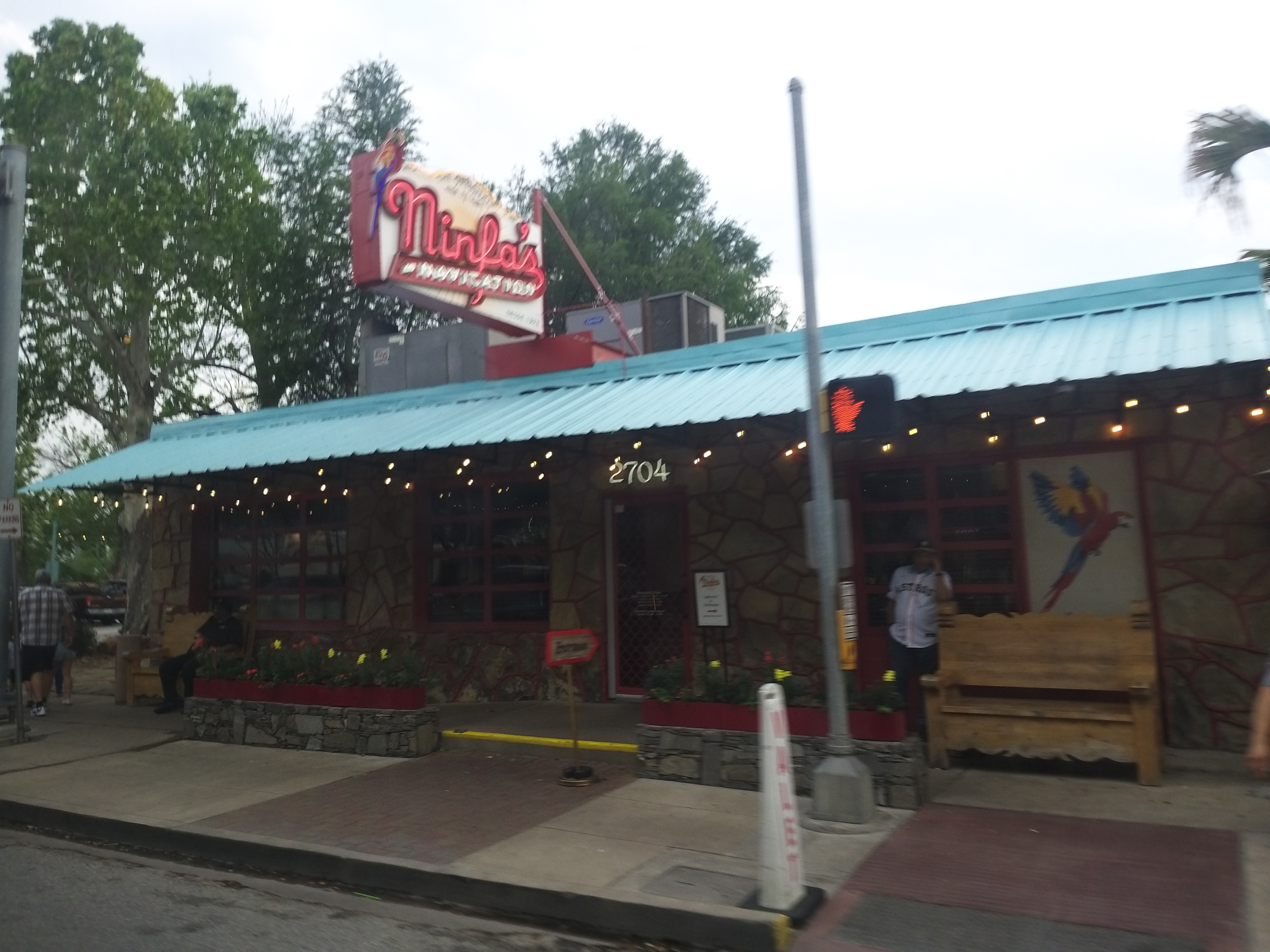
Ninfa's

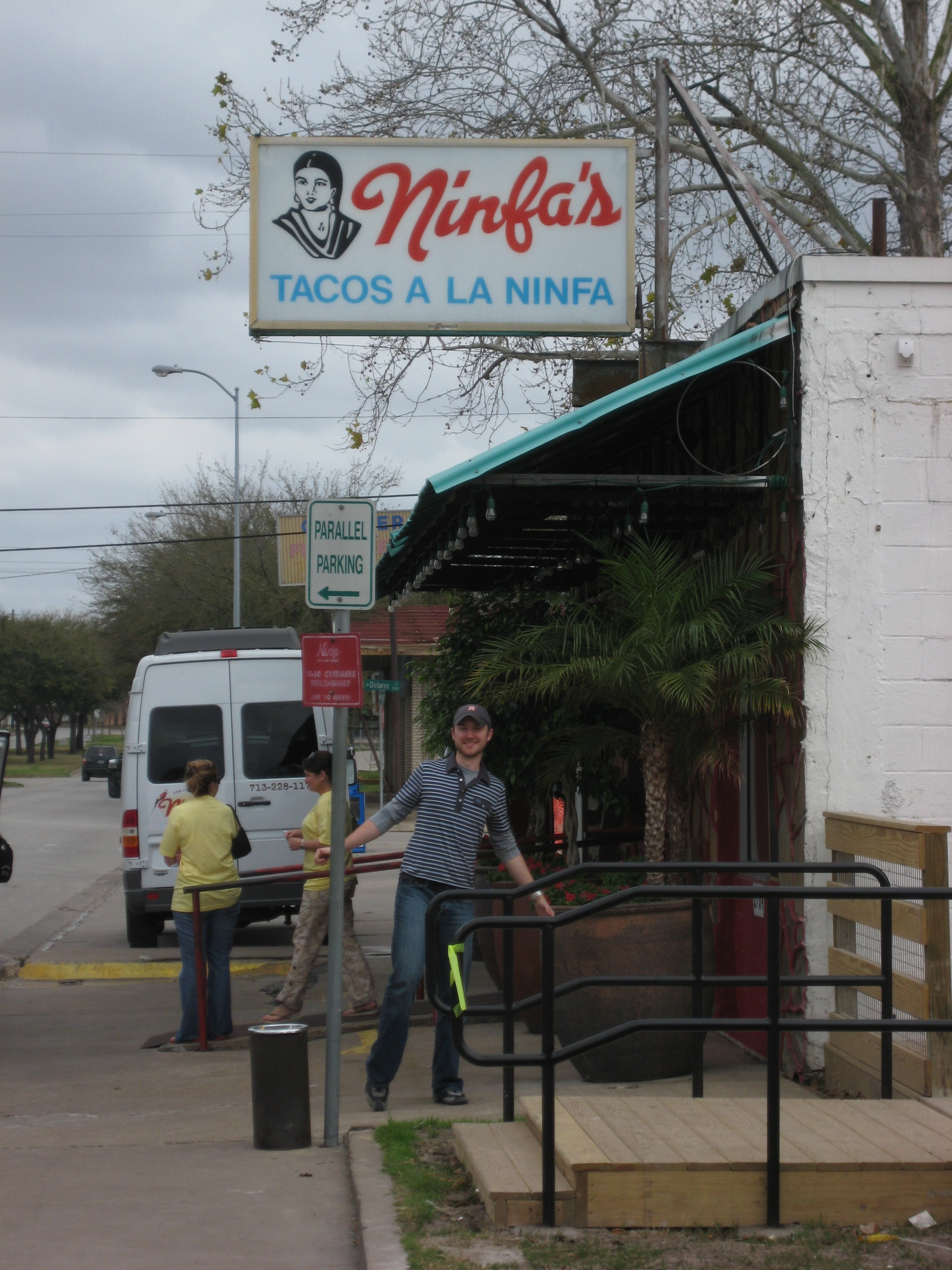
Original Ninfa's on Navigation Boulevard

The Original Ninfa's on Navigation is a popular Mexican restaurant located at 2704 Navigation Boulevard in Houston, Texas. The restaurant serves both Tex-Mex and Mexican cuisine. The Original Ninfa's was started by Ninfa Rodríguez Laurenzo, a Mexican-American woman, in a tortilla factory. Ninfa Laurenzo became a full-time restaurateur and the tortilla factory closed. Mama Ninfa is widely credited with popularizing the fajita among Houstonians.

Dai Huynh of the Houston Chronicle said that the Ninfa's locations opened after the first two restaurants "failed to attract the following of earlier restaurants." Tom Laurenzo said that the Laurenzo family never became very wealthy while it controlled the Ninfa's restaurants. He said "Everything was put back into the business." When the Laurenzo family controlled the restaurant chain, it was managed by Ninfa's Inc., which became a subsidiary of the Laurenzo-controlled holding company RioStar Corp.

== History ==
=== 1970s ===
In 1973, Ninfa Laurenzo, a widow with five children, established Ninfa's, then a taco stand, as a side business due to financial troubles with her original core business, a tortilla factory. Laurenzo's factory was losing money, and she needed to update her equipment in order to comply with new regulations. When Laurenzo decided to establish a restaurant, she applied for loans at several banks. The banks turned her down, so a friend in Mexico City loaned her several thousand dollars. Laurenzo divided the factory facility in half. The back of the factory continued to act as a tortilla factory, while the front had ten tables and 40 chairs. Laurenzo used discarded second hand furniture and pots and pans from her kitchen in the restaurant. The Ninfa's restaurant opened in July of that year. The cuisine at Ninfa's differed from the cuisine of Tex Mex restaurants at the time. The restaurant almost closed after a fire struck one week after its initial opening. Dai Huynh of the Houston Chronicle said "Word quickly spread about the East End restaurant with good, cheap food and an outgoing Mexican Mama who greeted diners with open arms."

Laurenzo tripled the space of the original Ninfa's and closed the tortilla-making operations. The restaurant became a family-owned corporation. Around 1976 the restaurant was becoming popular among many groups of people, including employees in Downtown Houston, area politicians, and other groups. Ninfa's became so popular that, in 1975, she opened a second location on Westheimer Road, one that was larger than the original. In 1977 Richard West of the Texas Monthly said "no other Texas restaurant dictates the dining-out habits of so many of its city's inhabitants" and that the restaurant is "a favorite topic of conversation among Mexican food fanciers not just in Houston but all over the state."

Around June 1977 the original Ninfa's on Navigation averaged 400 customers daily for lunch and 700 daily for dinner. During the same time the Ninfa's on Westheimer averaged 600 customers daily for lunch and 1,000 daily for dinner. The averages remained constant for all seven days of the week. In 1978 the restaurant chain had 500 employees, including 60 workers in the kitchens. Among the employees were members of Laurenzo's family. Laurenzo's five children, including four sons and one daughter, managed aspects of the Ninfa's business. Phyllis Mandola worked as the manager of the catering division. Jack Laurenzo, one son, and Ninfa Laurenzo held weekly cooking classes. Pilar Di Meo, Laurenzo's twin sister, worked in the restaurant's main office. Di Meo's son, Steve, worked as a personnel manager.

Workers and municipal employees who had discovered restaurant chain took family members there. Throughout the restaurant's history, many celebrities, including Aerosmith, George H. W. Bush, George Benson, Dyan Cannon, Michael Douglas, Crystal Gayle, Rock Hudson, Reba McEntire, John Travolta, Ben Vereen, and ZZ Top ate at Ninfa's. Travolta had a private corner at the Westheimer Ninfa's location while he filmed Urban Cowboy, and while flying in his private aircraft he often stopped in Houston to pick up Ninfa's food. Bill Schadewald of the Houston Business Journal said that eating at Ninfa's became an integral routine of tourists in the Houston area.

=== 1980s ===
In 1980 Ninfa's had seven restaurants. Roland Laurenzo, the head of Ninfa's parent company, decided to expand the number of locations. In 1980 and 1981 Ninfa's opened four restaurants in Dallas. In 1981 the chain grossed $30 million. In 1982 the chain had 13 restaurants. Because of problems with the business, Ninfa's ultimately had to close three of the four new Dallas locations. At later points in the 1980s Ninfa's closed another Dallas location and a San Antonio location. Greg Hassel of the Houston Chronicle said that expanding Ninfa's "has not always been easy."

In the early 1980s there were nine Ninfa's. The profits from the original two restaurants were used to open the other seven. By 1983 Ninfa's became the largest Hispanic-owned business in Houston. In 1987 there were nine Ninfa's locations in Greater Houston. In September 1987 the chain celebrated its tenth anniversary of the Westheimer restaurant, with a weeklong schedule of festivities.

==== McFaddin Ventures ====
In 1985 Ninfa's established a joint venture with McFaddin Ventures, a nightclub operator, in order to reduce the family's risks in opening new restaurants. At the time opening a new restaurant would have a cost of $1.5 million. In October of that year McFaddin paid Ninfa's $635,000 for the rights of the future use of the Ninfa's name, and Roland Laurenzo and another Ninfa's executive joined McFaddin; these actions began the joint venture. Roland became the senior vice president of the McFaddin restaurant group. McFaddin was required to pay a quarterly fee to Ninfa's based on the restaurant chain's sales. As part of the agreement, McFaddin was to open 12 Ninfa's locations by April 25, 1989. After the opening of the tenth restaurant, it was supposed to continually operate ten of the restaurants for a five-year period.

Less than nine months after the agreement was signed, Roland Laurenzo and six other McFaddin employees were terminated, and McFaddin sued Ninfa's and the Laurenzo family. In its suit, McFaddin said that Ninfa's and the Laurenzo family had threatened to picket the McFaddin restaurant and disrupt McFaddin restaurants, defamed McFaddin, and asked McFaddin employees to disrupt operations at the McFaddin restaurants. Ninfa's counter-sued McFaddin in the fall of 1986, saying that McFaddin changed the name of the Bandera division, an Austin, Texas-based home delivery Mexican food stores that opened and closed in 1986, in order to deprive Ninfa's of revenues. After civil action from both sides occurred, the parties agreed to a settlement.

=== 1990s ===
In 1993 Ninfa's had 43 restaurants in Texas and Louisiana. In a one-year period ending on October 16, 1996, Ninfa's embarked on an expansion program, opening six new restaurants, with new locations in four Texas cities: El Paso, Killeen, Tyler, and Waco, Shreveport, Louisiana, and Leipzig, Germany. The new locations required large amounts of capital, and RioStar bought equipment, paper goods, and supplies from the company Sysco. This caused the company to accumulate a lot of debt quickly. When the chain expanded outside of Texas, people unfamiliar with the name did not understand what "Ninfa" meant, so the chain named restaurants outside of Greater Houston and Greater Dallas "Mama Ninfa's Mexican Restaurants." In October 1996 the chain had 40 restaurants, including 36 in Texas, three in Louisiana, and one in Downtown Atlanta, Georgia. Its Shreveport, Louisiana location had opened in October 1996.

==== Germany restaurant ====
One individual, a Houston businessperson named Eckart Wieske, opened a 250-seat licensed Ninfa's restaurant in Leipzig, Germany. Due to higher than expected costs, Wieske was unable to cover his debts, and on October 16, 1996, the bank that lent him money took control of the restaurant. The Ninfa's in Leipzig remained open after the bank had taken possession of it.

==== Bankruptcy protection and settlement ====
In October 1996, Sysco filed an involuntary bankruptcy petition against RioStar in an attempt to force the company to pay $2.8 million ($5.75 million in today's money) in debts accumulated from the company's expansion. RioStar filed for Chapter 11 bankruptcy protection. In 1998 Serrano's Cafe, an Austin, Texas-based company, acquired RioStar as part of the bankruptcy protection settlement. The family was no longer involved in Ninfa's.

=== 2000s and present ===
Ninfa Laurenzo, the restaurant's founder, died of bone cancer at the age of 77, on Sunday June 17, 2001.

In 2001 there were 55 Ninfa's locations controlled by Serrano's. The restaurants in Georgia and Louisiana were independent franchises. In 2005 Ninfa's continued to have locations in Texas, Baton Rouge, Louisiana, Shreveport, Louisiana, and Georgia.

In 2006, Niel Morgan, the owner of the Antone's po boy chain, started the new firm Legacy Restaurants, then proceeded to make a deal with Serrano's. Morgan acquired the rights to the original Ninfa's and took direct control, while Serrano's began to license the Ninfa's name for eight other locations. After Morgan took control of the original restaurants, he proceeded to begin renovations, which added potted plants and a colonial Spanish-style bench. As part of Morgan's overhaul, a VIP parking service was added. Morgan also had the restrooms upgraded and added an outdoor deck and a parking lot.

The Original Ninfa's on Navigation has been owned and operated by Legacy Restaurants since mid-2006. The Executive Chef is Alex Padilla whose mother worked for Laurenzo when he was growing up in Houston. Legacy has made a number of improvements including a lighted parking lot and covered outdoor seating.

There are still "Ninfa's Mexican Restaurants" in Houston and elsewhere operated by independent owners who previously received licenses to use the name from the Laurenzo family. None of these are affiliated with the Original Ninfa's on Navigation. In 2008, there were 14 independently licensed Ninfa's locations.

In 2012, several licensed Ninfa's locations were converted into "Maggie Rita's Tex-Mex Grill & Bar," a restaurant chain co-owned by Carlos Mencia. Katharine Shilcutt of the Houston Press rated the food at the new restaurants negatively and said that "[i]t represents a new nadir for a once-respected and beloved Houston Tex-Mex institution." Shilcutt further added that the takeover caused an "uproar" in Houston and that "but to many longtime Houstonians (me included), the deal with interloper Maggie Rita's may as well have been a pact with the devil."

In 2012 Shilcutt said that overall, "Ninfa's hadn't been that great in a long time". She explained that the original location was "still reflective of the restaurant chain when it was in its prime," while the other locations "have varying levels of food and service, although most have fallen away significantly from the high-quality cuisine offered at the Original and last of the true Ninfa's empire."

In November 2013 an enclosed patio opened at the original Ninfa's.

In 2017, the original Ninfa's was featured on a Houston-based episode of the Travel Channel show Man v. Food, hosted by Casey Webb.

The owners of the original Ninfa's plan to open another branch at BLVD Place in Uptown Houston in 2019.

== Cuisine ==
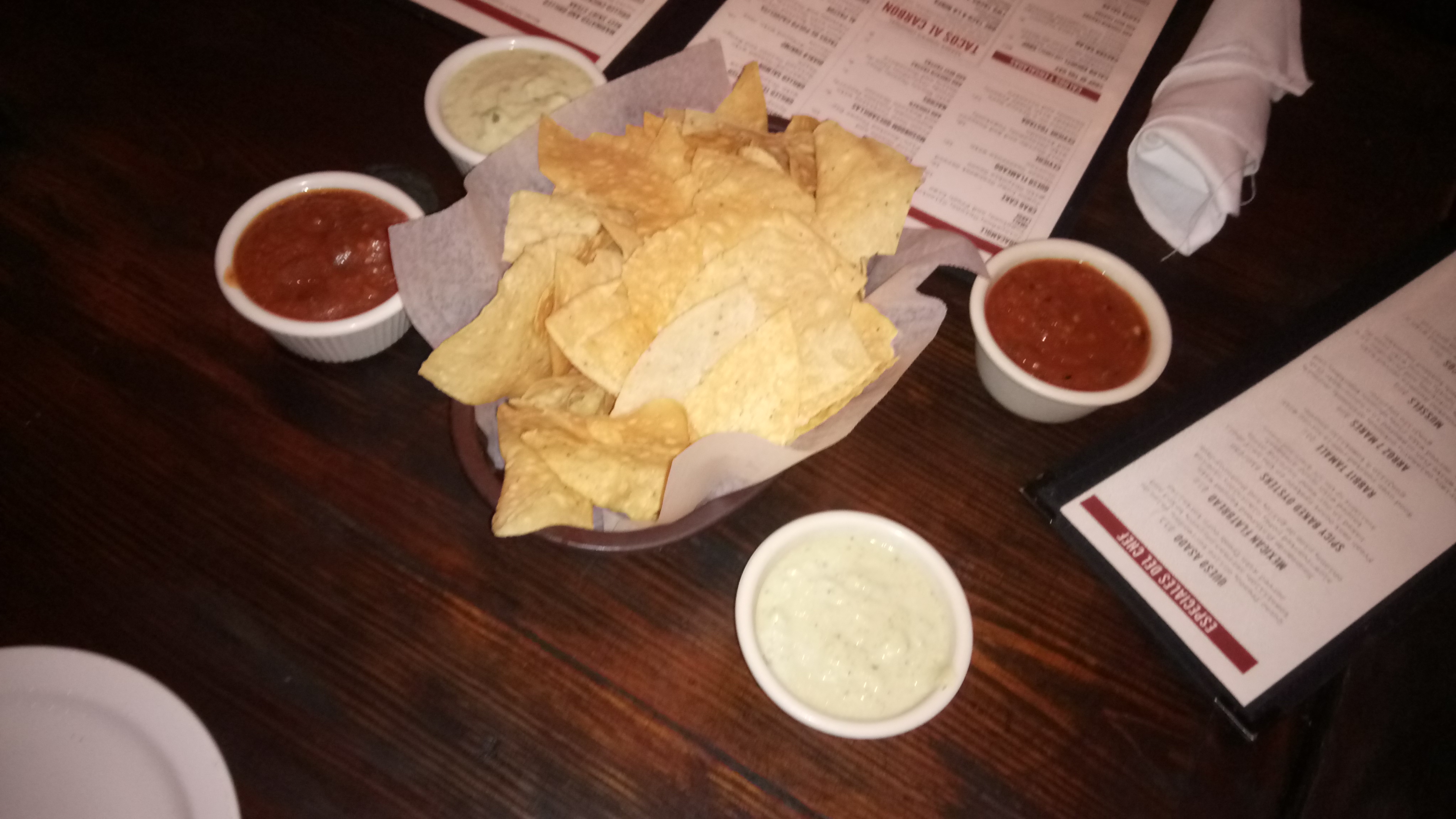
Original Ninfa's chips, tomato salsa, and green sauce

Ninfa's historically specialized in Tex-Mex and Norteño style Mexican dishes. Ninfa Laurenzo drew inspiration from the cooking of her mother, who was a Mexican, and from Laurenzo's own travels to Mexico City. The food had an Italian influence because Laurenzo's deceased husband, Domenic Thomas Laurenzo, was an Italian American. Mozzarella, olive oil, and parmesan were used as ingredients.

The signature dish was "tacos al carbon," which later became called "fajitas." The Ninfa's fajitas included chopped, char-grilled beef fillets placed in handmade flour tortillas. Ninfa's used a smoky marinade in the beef fajitas. The restaurant popularized fajitas in the Houston area. This dish was so influential that, by 2001, just about all Tex-Mex restaurants in Houston served a version of the Ninfa's fajitas.

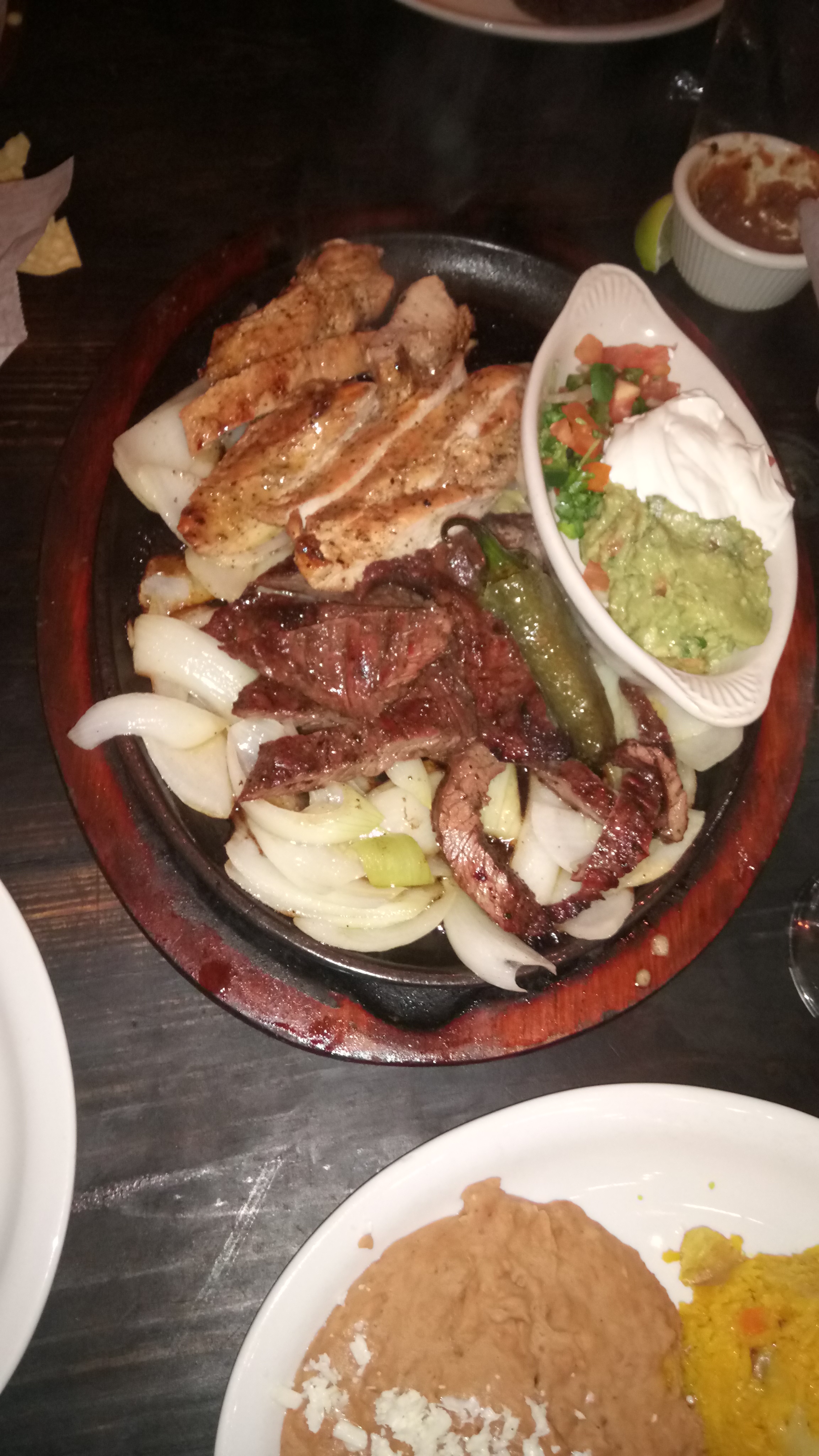
Original Ninfa's tacos al carbón/fajitas

The second most popular dish was the "Green Sauce," an avocado and tomatillo sauce. When a customer had asked for "salsa verde," Ninfa Laurenzo created the "Green Sauce" at the spur of the moment. Ninfa Laurenzo's son Roland later offered a modified version of this dish at his own restaurant, using pureed avocados, tomatillos, cilantro, garlic, and jalapeños. Patricia Sharpe of Texas Monthly said that Roland's version was a "creamier, more luxurious potion" than his mother's original recipe. Ninfa's also offered stuffed jalapeños. The stuffed jalapeños became a menu item at Tony Mandola's Gulf Coast Kitchen, operated by Phyllis Laurenzo Mandola, one of Ninfa Laurenzo's daughters, and her husband Tony.

In 2004 Sharpe said that, at the original Ninfa's, the beef fajitas "still have their old magic" and that the flour tortillas, still made to order in-house, "are truly carb-addictive." She said that the chicken fajitas "have lost their luster." After Neil Morgan took over the chain in 2006, chef Alex Padilla added some new menu items including crab cakes with poblano sauce and Spanish lobster in tequila butter sauce. Padilla also said that the restaurant would grind its own beef brisket for its crispy tacos and use fresh tomatillo in the green sauce.

The original Ninfa's includes several torta sandwiches, including the fajita burger, which consistently is positively reviewed. By July 2012 the restaurant introduced three new tortas, Al Pastor, Chicken Adobo, and Puerca (Pork).

== See also ==
- Bambolino's
- Antone's Import Company - Another brand owned by Legacy Restaurants
- History of the Mexican-Americans in Houston
- List of Tex-Mex restaurants
- Tex-Mex cuisine in Houston
- Felix Tijerina
- Molina's
- Frenchy's Chicken (Houston-based Louisiana Creole restaurant chain)
- Kim Sơn (Houston-based Vietnamese American restaurant chain)
