= Blood Bros. BBQ =

Restaurant in Texas

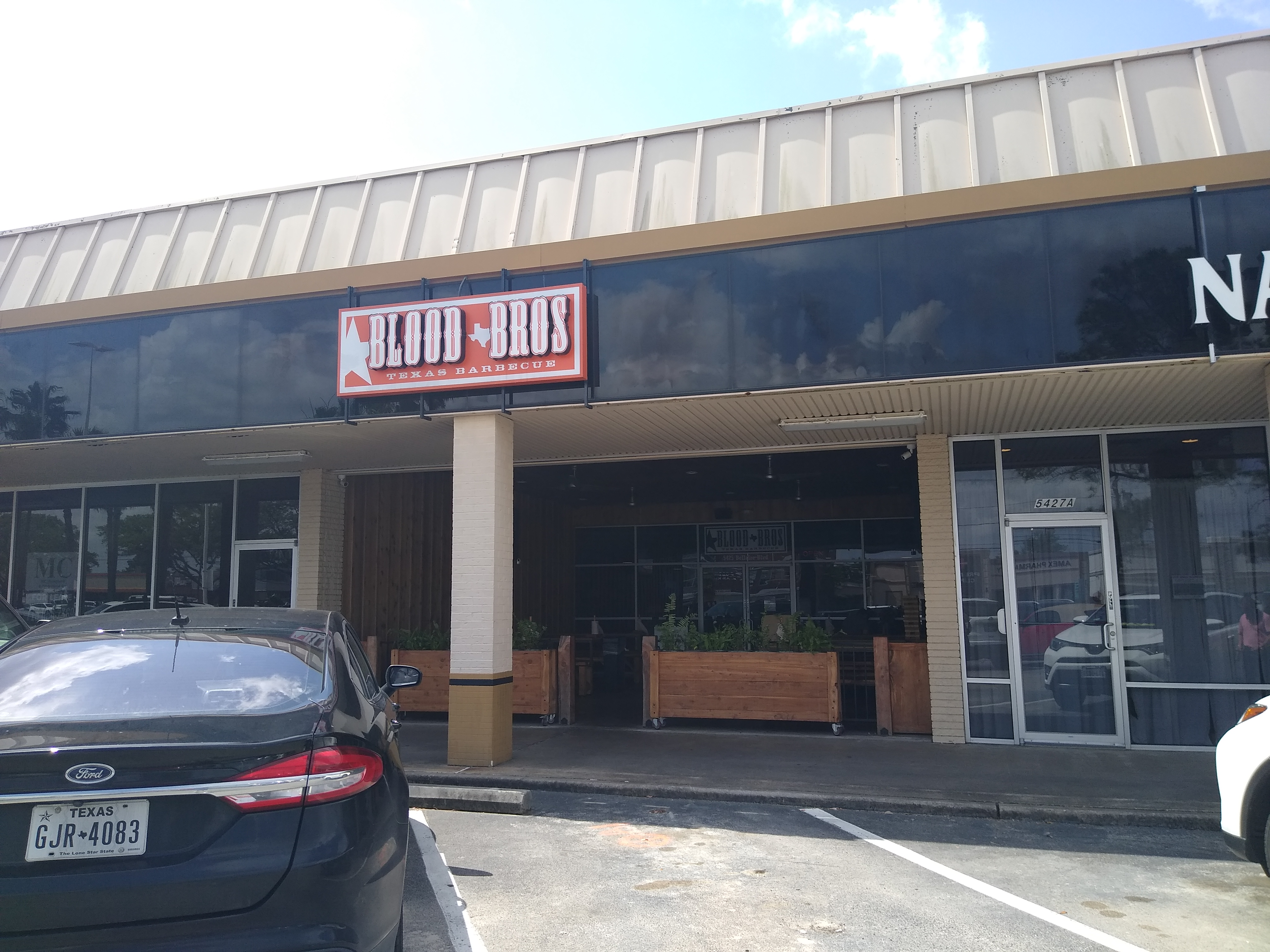
Blood Bros. BBQ

Blood Bros. BBQ is a barbecue restaurant in Bellaire, Texas in Greater Houston.

== Background ==
Robin and Terry Wong and Quy Hoang, the first two Chinese American brothers and the second a Vietnamese American, attended Alief Elsik High School, becoming acquainted in the mid-1980s. The three originated from the Houston community of Alief.

Wong's grandfather, from Canton (Guangzhou), arrived in the United States in 1926, moving to Houston in the 1960s after being in other cities. Hoang was born in Vietnam. When he was 18 months old, he, and his parents arrived in the United States in 1975. The co-founders had made trips to visit barbecue establishments in central Texas in Houston, and Chris Hughes of Food and Wine stated that the co-founders' interest initially was a "a backyard hobby". They also patronized west Houston's Asian restaurants.

The brothers and Hoang went out of contact after high school graduation but reconnected in the 2010s. The three began doing barbecue as a business when they paid $1,500 for a barrel smoker. The brothers became co-owners, and the latter became the pitmaster. Operations began in 2013, with sales on Saturdays. The Wongs co-owned Glitter Karaoke in Midtown, the first venue for food sales. Initially the food was sold at various Houston pop-up venues, and bars.

The permanent facility opened in late 2018, and is in the Bellaire Triangle Shopping Center, a strip mall, with $400,000 spent to purchase it. The space was previously a Smoothie King. Daniel Vaughn of Bon Appétit described it as "no-frills space". Additional business partners joined for the permanent facility.

== Cuisine ==
The barbecue at the establishment has Asian influences.

== Reception ==
In 2015 Robb Walsh and J. C. Reid of Houstonia wrote that Hoang had ample "creativity" and that the restaurant "is now mentioned in the same breath as Killen’s or Roegels."

In 2019 Sebastian Modak of The New York Times wrote "Much of the attention around Blood Bros.,[...] has been on the owners’ backgrounds", referring to their ethnicities.

By 2019 national publications wrote positive reviews about the restaurant. In 2019 Daniel Vaughn of Texas Monthly ranked it as an entry in "The Top 25 New Barbecue Joints in Texas". That same year Bon Appétit ranked it as one of 50 "America’s Best New Restaurants 2019". Allison Cook of the Houston Chronicle also ranked it as an entry in "Top 100 Houston Restaurant 2019".

== See also ==
- Cuisine of Houston
- History of Chinese Americans in Houston
- History of Vietnamese Americans in Houston
- List of Michelin Bib Gourmand restaurants in the United States
