= Antone's Famous Po' Boys =

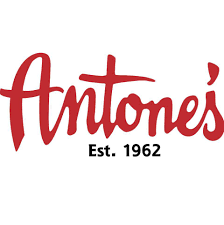

Restaurant information
- Location: Texas, United States

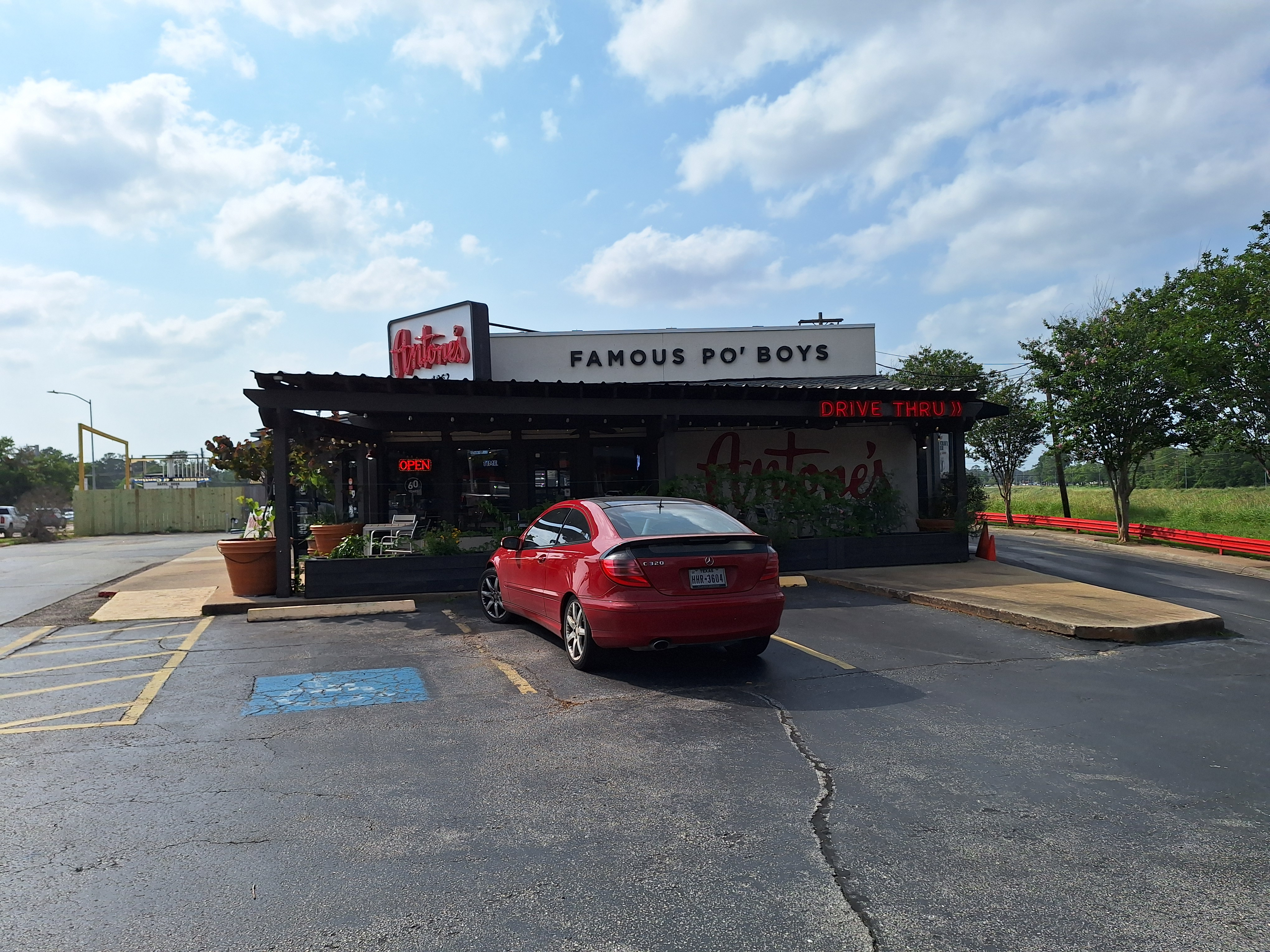
Antone's Sandwiches in northwest Houston

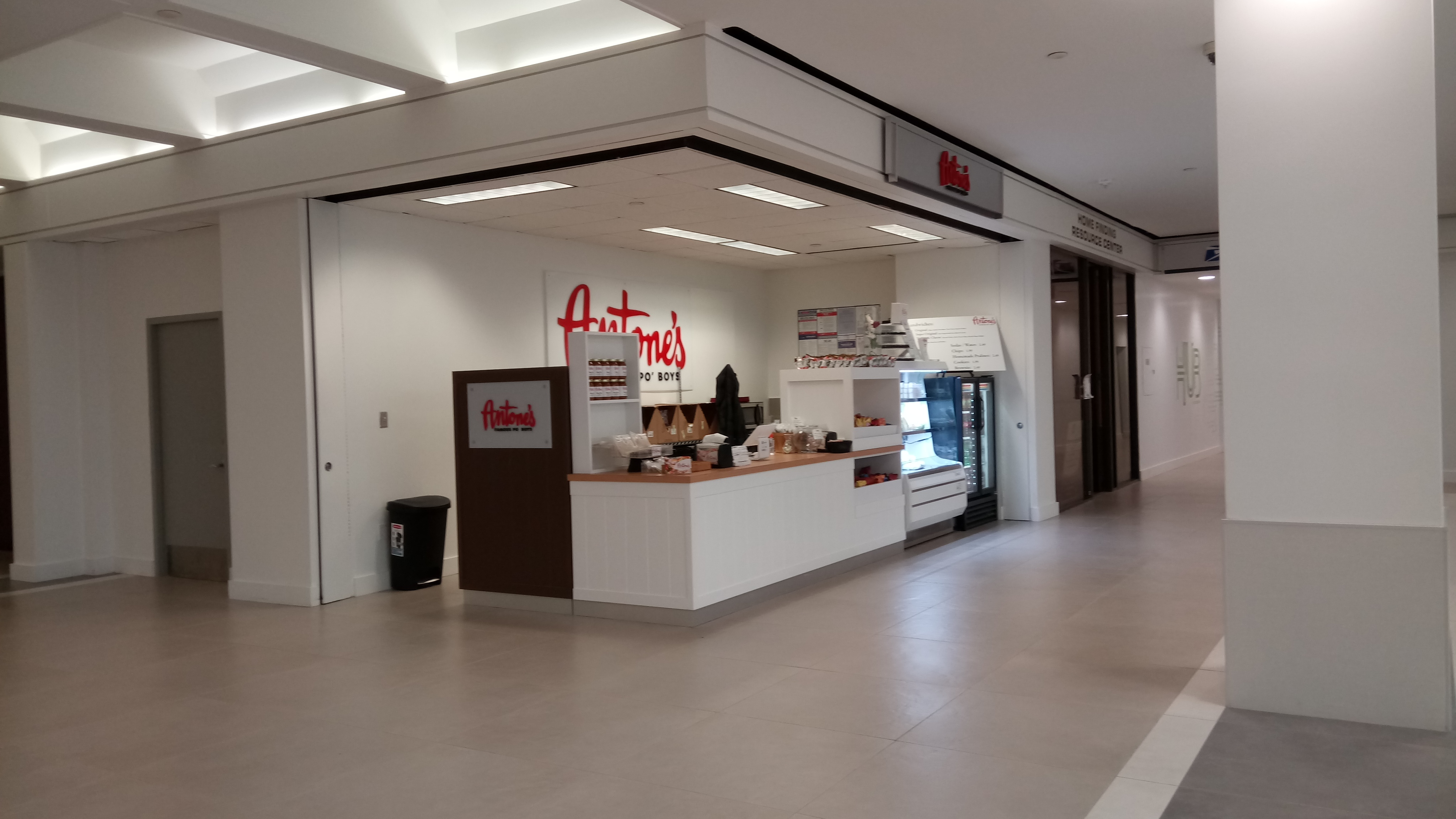
Antone's Sandwiches in Greenway Plaza

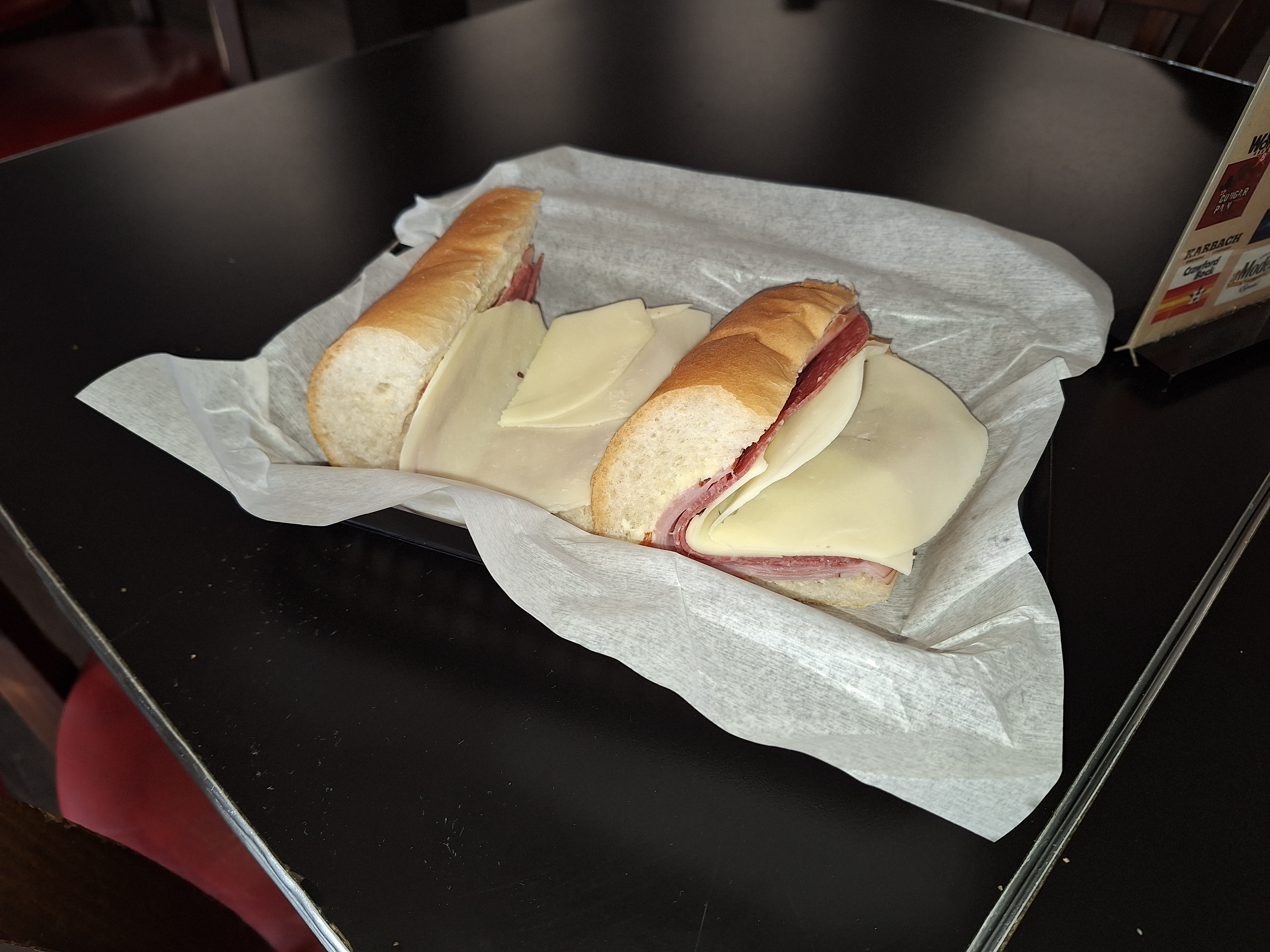
Antone's original sandwich

Antone's Famous Po' Boys, formerly Antone's Import Company, is a sandwich shop chain based in Houston, Texas. Established by Jalal Antone, an American of Lebanese and Syrian descent, it grew to having fifteen locations and having products distributed throughout the Southern United States, but was beset by ownership disputes within the surviving family in the 1990s. Legacy Restaurants now owns the trademark and operates all restaurants with the name. From circa the 1990s until 2018 several shops franchising the Antone's name were operated as the Original Antone's Import Company.

== History ==
Jalal E. Antone was born on February 21, 1912, to Syrian and Lebanese parents in Louisiana. Originating from Port Arthur, Texas, Antone came to Houston in the 1930s. There he managed a business to import and export goods. Antone married Josephine A. Antone (born August 14, 1914) on October 6, 1940. The couple had two daughters, Mary Jo Antone-Hatfield and Jamie Lee Antone.

Antone established the chain in 1962 as a restaurant on Taft Street, in the Fourth Ward. Originally he wanted to serve Levantine cuisine to Lebanese and Syrian Americans, but his brother-in-law stated that area residents at the time would not be accustomed to those cuisines, and so the business needed to be openly focused around more familiar cuisine. Therefore, Antone chose to make sandwiches the primary selling point of the business, while offering Levantine food on the side for the immigrants. He advised other ethnic Levantine restaurant operators to not openly market the restaurants as being Middle Eastern. Therefore, by 2008 multiple Houston-area restaurants selling Levantine cuisine also served sandwiches. The company's second and third locations were on Main Street and the intersection of San Felipe Road and Voss Road, respectively, with the former opening in 1967. Josephine received 98% of the company and the daughters received the remainder, after Jalal Antone's death on February 9, 1974. Josephine was the head of Antone's and sublicensed to her daughters the rights to do catering, as J.J. Gregory Gourmet Services. Antone-Hatfield stated that she entered the business upon her father's request even though she initially planned to work in the music industry as she studied theater and music.

In 1976 a 20-year-old Lebanese man named Antonios "Tony" Okde, unrelated to the Antone family and a civil engineering major at the University of Houston, began manning the cash register at an Antone's. Okde, who went to Houston to avoid the Lebanese Civil War, had originally intended on making money to support himself during his studies and planned on having a career in a petroleum firm, but he grew in the business, assuming more responsibilities and opening his own franchises. Okde occupied a post on the board of directors by the 1980s. The mother and daughters became involved in several lawsuits, with Okde siding with the mother. The mother-controlled company accused the daughters of not following the licensing terms and filed suit against the daughters; the arbitration resulted in a win for the defendants. Okde served as the company's director of operations by the year 1990, and as a vice president the same year. Additional lawsuits were filed by the company against the daughters when the company accused the latter of allowing supermarkets to sell Antone's products without permission and insufficient royalty payments in 1992 and trying to improperly sell the franchise in 1996. By the latter year the daughters and mother were not on speaking terms; the daughters accused Okde and another member of the board, Peter Basralian, of tricking Josephine, an accusation the men denied.

Around fifteen Antone's shops were in Houston circa the 1990s. In addition, licensed Antone's products appeared throughout the Southern United States. An investor named Neil Morgan acquired J.J. Gregory Gourmet's assets in 1996 after the company entered bankruptcy. Even though the mother wanted Okde to remain, he had plans to resign from Antone's in 1999. Josephine died on March 15, 2003, and the original Fourth Ward location closed the same year. Around 2005, Morgan bought the trademarks from Josephine's estate. Antone's became a part of the Legacy Restaurants umbrella in 2006, and therefore Legacy now held the Antone's trademark.

The Okde family continued operating their own franchised Antone's, using the name Original Antone's. Vana Inc., with Tony Okde being one of the owners, was the operating company. In 2008 there were four Legacy Antone's and three Vana Antone's. John Nova Lomax of Houstonia wrote that the Legacy locations "franchised and tried to take the name far and wide" while the Original ones "kept things close to home and more traditional", and that the fissure developed in the 1990s. By 2012, four Antone's remained in Houston. The franchise agreements ultimately expired, with Legacy not allowing renewal, in April 2018; the Okdes chose not to file lawsuits and instead decided to run sandwich shops under new names; the Okde's legal representation agreed that Legacy had the rights to the Antone's name. By 2018 there were only two Antone's remaining in Houston.

In 2018 grocery stores in Austin, Texas, again began selling Antone's sandwiches. The Antone's nightclub in Austin, established by Jalal Antone's nephew, Clifford Antone, began selling Antone's sandwiches in 2018. The varieties available at the nightclub are Original, Super, Tuna, and Turkey. In October 2017, Houstonian consumer packaged food executive, Craig F. Lieberman, was hired as a consultant to the Company and became CEO and a limited partner in July 2020. In fall 2019, an Antone's Famous Po'Boys location in the Texas Medical Center opened. The store closed temporarily during the COVID-19 pandemic and closed permanently by 2021. Antone's Po Boys began selling in Texas Children's Hospital, expanded to University of Texas DKR Texas Memorial Stadium in 2020 and Austin Bergstrom International Airport in 2021. To celebrate their 60th anniversary, a Fried Green Tomato Po Boy was created in conjunction with Billy F. Gibbons, lead guitarist with ZZTop. Proceeds were provided to The Clifford Antone Foundation to support emerging musical artists.

In 2022 the sandwiches began to be distributed to supermarkets in North Texas and Waco.

In 2023, Antone's began selling packaged sandwiches at Houston Hobby and George Bush International Airports by 2024. Antone's was selling Po Boys in over 500 supermarkets in Texas and their packaged sandwiches were sold in sports venues at Texas A&M, Baylor, Southern Methodist and University of Houston, and Texas Southern University.The company became a sponsor of the Houston Open PGA and the Austin Blues Festival in 2024, selling sandwiches at both events.

== Products and cuisine ==
Antone developed a Po-Boy with chowchow added to ham, salami and provolone cheese, served cold. The sandwich is currently known as the "Original Po' Boy" and was previously the "regular". There is also a version with added meats and cheeses called the "Super". Stephen Paulsen of the Houston Chronicle stated that the "Original" variety is "in the city's food DNA, the Shipley Do-Nuts of sandwiches." John Lomax of Houstonia described the 1970s and 1980s as the height of their popularity and that the growth of chain sandwich shops that operated across the United States, the introduction of banh mi, and the poor quality of third party sandwiches in gas stations resulted in a decrease in popularity for the variety. Lomax in particular stated that the storage of the sandwiches at grocery stores ruined the flavor due to the delicate properties of the chowchow and mayonnaise. In 2002, 40% of the sandwiches sold at Antone's were the "Original" variety.

Other menu items include roast beef and smoked turkey sandwiches as well as chicken salad, ham salad (known as "Piggy"), and sweet pickles. According to Legacy, the other varieties were available by the year 1970 but the company had no specific information on when each variety was first available. Legacy introduced Italian-style menu items and salads after it assumed 2006 ownership. Historically the company had, aside from chowchow sandwiches, ones with mayonnaise available. Morgan's restaurants added other sauces in 2002 due to some customers wanting bolder flavors. The restaurant also sells a "Tex-Mex Cheesesteak" that was ranked number one in the "Best Sandwiches in America 2019", a ranking by Legacy Restaurants executive chef Alex Padilla. The stores also sell or sold cheeses, pasta, and pickled seafood products. As of 2018 the Houston company Royal Bakery supplies the bread used by Antone's restaurants. The company began offering new sandwiches with well known Houston Celebrities and Chefs with proceeds going to local charities.

Okde's family stated that Tony Okde had created several of the menu items; a Legacy representative stated that the company was unaware of this, and if this was indeed the case, the company in 2018 does not any longer sell these items. Antone's continued product development of their condiments and to meet consumer preferences. Antone's pickles and chow chow relish began selling to Houston supermarkets by 2020.

== See also ==
- Ninfa's - Another brand owned by Legacy Restaurants
- Cuisine of Houston
- Ethnic groups in Houston - Includes a section about Middle Eastern Houstonians
