= Mexican Restaurants, Inc. =

- Company type: Subsidiary
- Industry: restaurant
- Headquarters: Houston, Texas, United States
- Number of locations: 78
- Area served: Texas0; Oklahoma; Louisiana; Michigan
- Key people: Curt Glowacki (CEO); Andrew J. Dennard (EVP, CFO); Lou Porry (COO)
- Services: Mexican and Tex-Mex food service
- Revenue: ▲US$82,264,000 (2006)
- Operating income: ▼US$3,047,000 (2006)
- Net income: ▼US$1,138,000 (2006)
- Total assets: US$33,276,000 (2006)
- Total equity: US$20,573,000 (2006)
- Number of employees: 2,877 (2006)
- Parent: Williston Holding Company Inc.
- Website: Mexican Restaurants, Inc.

Mexican Restaurants, Inc. is a Houston, Texas-based restaurant company.

As of 2015, they have 46 company operated locations, 10 franchised and one licensed.

The company operates five different concepts: Casa Ole, Überrito Fresh Mex (formerly Mission Burrito), Monterey's Little Mexico, Tortuga Mexican Kitchen and Crazy Jose's. The company operates restaurants in Texas, Oklahoma and Louisiana.
