= Frenchy's Chicken =

Restaurant chain in Houston, Texas, United States

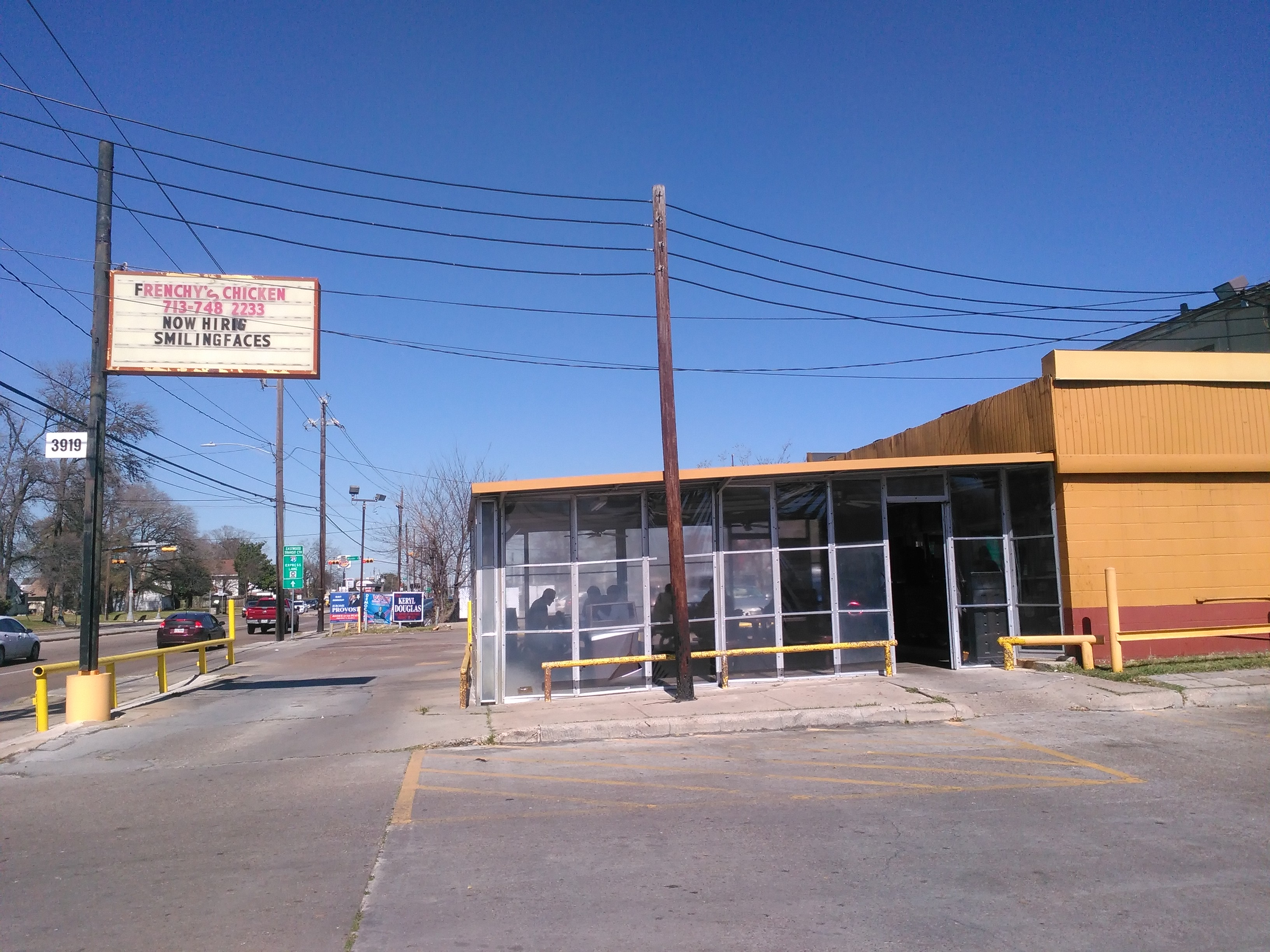
The original Frenchy's (since demolished)

Frenchy's Chicken is a restaurant chain in Houston, Texas, selling Louisiana Creole cuisine. It was established in 1969 by Percy "Frenchy" Creuzot Jr.

In 2010 Allan Turner of the Houston Chronicle wrote that the original location, still operated by the founding family, and the chain-operated locations together have a "loyal clientele". Houston R&B artist Beyoncé Knowles made references to the chain in her music.

== History ==
In 1969 Percy "Frenchy" Creuzot Jr., a New Orleans native who had traveled to Houston for sales work, and Sallie, his wife, established the restaurant. The original restaurant, in the Third Ward area, is in proximity to both the University of Houston and Texas Southern University. Creuzot's wife had operated the original location.

Creuzot opened the store by leasing a storefront in the Third Ward area with $2,000 ($17558.98 when adjusted for inflation). Creuzot originally planned to name the restaurant "Etienne" after a shortened form of the middle name of his daughter. Creuzot stated that a friend believed that potential customers would not know how to spell or pronounce it or find it in a phone book, so he suggested "Frenchy's Po-Boys" as a name.

The original restaurant opened on July 3, 1969. On that day, the restaurant received $14 ($122.91 when adjusted for inflation). Creuzot used a shoebox to store cash until he had enough money to buy a cash register. Over the summer, the business slowly increased. When university students began attending classes in the fall, business tremendously increased.

Initially Creuzot's restaurant sold red beans and rice, hot sausage, and oyster loaf. An automobile dealer adjacent to the restaurant, Jesse Hearns, suggested and persuaded Creuzot into adding fried chicken into the menu. Creuzot stated that Hearns went to the restaurant and cooked the chicken for him, and "If he hadn't, I probably wouldn't." Hearns argued that Creuzot did not need to teach Houstonians how to eat fried chicken while he would have to teach them how to eat other kinds of Louisiana food, and that Houstonians were familiar with fried chicken; if the Houstonians liked fried chicken, Creuzot would be able to introduce them to other kinds of food. Creuzot received a recipe for fried chicken from a family friend in New Orleans and Creuzot himself slightly modified the recipe. The restaurant's name changed to "Frenchy's Creole-Fried Chicken". By 1985 the chicken made up over 75% of Creuzot's business. Creuzot gained the nickname "Frenchy" because people associated the name of the restaurant with him.

In order to compete with a Church's Chicken location across the street and less than one block away, Creuzot made the closing time later, to 5 a.m. In his late night operations he collected the money before making the food, and he only served fried chicken and french fries. Creuzot often began frying chicken just after Church's closed.

The Handbook of Texas stated that the original restaurant became a "training ground" for members of the Creuzot family.

=== 1970s ===
In 1974, when interviewed by the Houston Chronicle, Creuzot stated that he felt satisfaction in regards to the financial performance of his original restaurant but he wanted to be on the Black Enterprise list of the top 100 businesses owned by black people in the United States.

Creuzot decided to open more locations after a competing business opened near Frenchy's. The second Frenchy's opened in 1979. Within a six-month period after the competitor appeared, four new Frenchy's locations opened.

=== 1980s ===
In 1983 Frenchy's was ranked 89th place, with annual sales of $7.5 million, in the Black Enterprise ranking. In 1984 he was ranked 90th place, with $1 million per restaurant location and $11 million in total sales. In the entire year of 1984 the total sales ultimately were over $12 million. In 1985 its rank fell to 96th. Frenchy's received recognition as a successful black-operated business. At that time the original restaurant alone had annual sales of $1.6 million. By 1985 there were 12 Frenchy's restaurants in Greater Houston. At that time there was one restaurant in Southwest Houston geared to younger, trendier adults and there was one near River Oaks.

In 1986 the company leased a 2,687-square-foot (249.6 m^{2}) Bo Jangle's Restaurant along Farm to Market Road 1960.

In 1987 the company had 12 restaurants owned by the company, all in Houston, and four franchises, with some in Houston and some in San Antonio and Dallas. Beginning in 1985 the company's revenues declined due to the 1980s oil bust; the fact that all company-owned restaurants were in Houston made it vulnerable to an economic downturn in the city. On Thursday April 30, 1987, Frenchy's filed for Chapter 11 bankruptcy protection, affecting the company-owned locations only. At the time the company had $1.5 million in secured assets and $506,438 in unsecured assets. Frenchy's Sausage Co. was not a part of the bankruptcy proceedings.

In 1988 the Houston City Council approved a plan to loan $700,000 ($1905599.32 with inflation) in federal funds to the chain to assist it. The city council approved the loan to preserve jobs for the Houston black community. According to the terms of the agreement, Creuzot would have to have a value of property put up for collateral at the same amount as the loan, by the deadline, December 31, 1988. Creuzot stated that with its other loans the City of Houston never required a 100% collateral. Mike Marcotte, the active planning director of the city government, stated that Frenchy's was the first loan that the city council had approved for a company in bankruptcy court, and therefore the city required a 100% collateral.

In a letter dated April 7, 1989 Marcotte informed Creuzot that Frenchy's did not fulfill the terms of the agreement. On the day of the deadline his property was appraised at $350,000; the city government expected it would be $1.3 million. In response Creuzot wrote that the appraisal at $350,000 was "not even close to the valuation of the land itself without a 50,000-square-foot building on it. If there was any malice, it was certainly not on our part." Creuzot added that the Harris County Appraisal District had appraised his property at $499,980 in 1987, with improvements valued at $616,320, and also that Frenchy's had tried to meet the loan's terms for several months.

As of April 1989 the chain had 10 restaurants. By June 1 of that year, five Frenchy's locations posted notices of foreclosure. After the bankruptcy protection, Creuzot lost control of all of his restaurants. Percy III, Creuzot's son, took control of the original restaurant. Angele, Creuzot's daughter, began operating a restaurant along South Shepherd in Neartown. A. Grace Development took control of five Frenchy's restaurants; A. Grace was operated by a former employee of Creuzot, Darryl Hall.

=== 1990s ===
The South Shepherd restaurant closed in January 1990. A. Grace filed for Chapter 11 in 1990. In April 1991 A. Grace emerged from Chapter 11.

=== 2000s ===
By the 2000s Frenchy's consisted of only the original restaurant and a companion restaurant, also in the Third Ward. Both were owned by the Creuzot family. The satellite location is inside a supermarket, an H-E-B. For many years Frenchy's had only those locations.

In 2001 3131 Properties and Frenchy's agreed to have several new restaurants operated by Glennlock Foods, an operating company doing business as "Frenchy's". Creuzot stated that he did not want to do franchising at first but that the CEO, a former Houston Texans player named Aaron Glenn, was "such an impressive guy and sincere, we gave him a limited franchising network of ten stores." Creuzot himself trained the cooks who were going to work at the franchised restaurants. In June 2005 the first restaurant under the agreement opened in Missouri City and the following restaurants opened in Houston. By 2009 the seventh Glennlock location opened in northwest Harris County along Farm to Market Road 1960.

=== 2010s ===
On Sunday June 6, 2010, Frenchy Creuzot Jr. died of a stroke.

Frenchy's decided to sell land to Wheeler Avenue Baptist Church; this was the initial restaurant on 3919 Scott. The decision was made in 2016.

On January 4, 2019, the original Frenchy's was scheduled to close and be replaced by a temporary location; this was delayed from January 1, 2019. The demolition of the original Frenchy's was to be on January 7. The permanent new central Frenchy's was to open in 2022.

== Cuisine ==
The signature food item is the fried chicken. In addition to fried chicken and french fries, the other food items include dirty rice, gumbo, and jambalaya. At the beginning the restaurant sold red beans and rice, hot sausage, and oyster loaf.

== Locations ==
As of 2020 the locations include the original restaurant on Scott Street in the Third Ward; the following franchised restaurants in the City of Houston: S. Victory (Acres Homes), Almeda at Almeda Plaza, Atascocita, Barker Cypress, West and Veterans, Rankin Road, Wilcrest and Murphy and Richmond and Beltway 8

The chain has recently announced a major outpost expansion across multiple Houston institutions, including Texas Southern University, Wheeler Avenue Baptist Church, Jack Yates High School, and the University of Houston.

In 2011 Minh T. Truong of the Houston Press wrote that the original restaurant received its charm from the quality of the food and from the "old and a little rundown" facility with a parking lot that only allows entry and exit in one direction, along the drive-through window.

== Reception ==
In 2011 Truong wrote that the original location's food "is good, really good. Some say it's the best in Houston, but no one can doubt it's comfort food." In regards to the chain locations, Truong wrote "It's hard to say any location of Frenchy's is truly bad when you're craving it, but the location on the Southwest Freeway leaves a lot to be desired." Ro B wrote a song mentioning Frenchy's. In the third verse Ro sings, "I like Frenchy's red beans and rice and that slam jam hot sauce and fried chicken. When it's hot, it does not, say I love not oh yeah."

== Frenchy's Sausage Company ==
The same family that owns the original locations also operates the Frenchy's Sausage Co. It was established in 1977, and it was given to Creuzot's son, Percy III. It sells sausage and meats to independent grocery stores and restaurants.

== See also ==
- History of the African-Americans in Houston
- Our Mother of Mercy Catholic Church (Creole Catholic church)
- Ninfa's (Houston-based Mexican-American restaurant chain)
- Kim Sơn (Houston-based Vietnamese-American restaurant chain)
