= Shipley Do-Nuts =

American doughnut company and coffeehouse chain

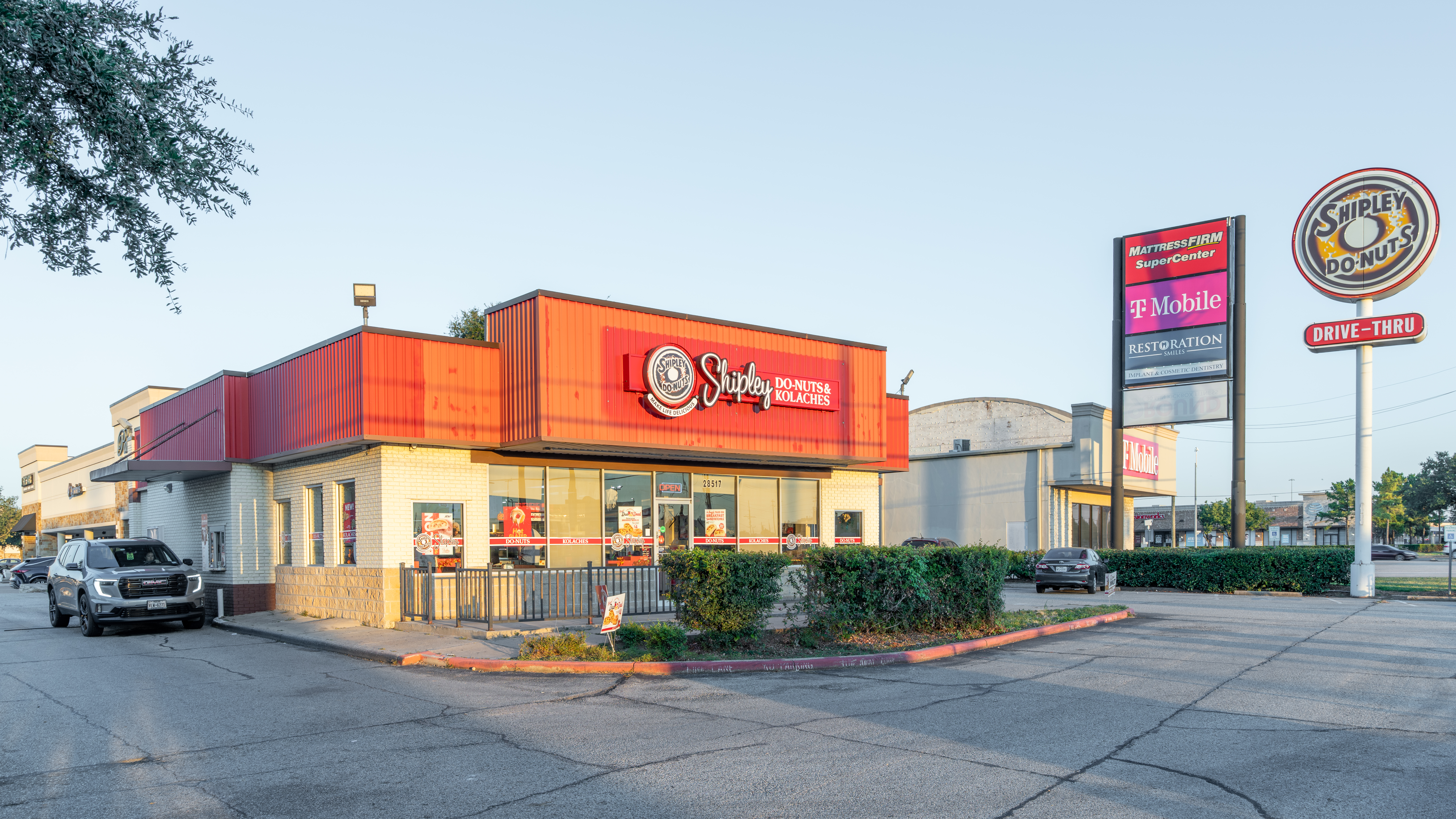
- Location in Tomball, Texas
- Company type: Private
- Industry: doughnut shops coffeehouse
- Founded: 1936; 90 years ago
- Founder: Lawrence Shipley
- Headquarters: Houston, Texas, United States
- Number of locations: 325 (2021)
- Key people: Flynn Dekker (CEO); Brad Reynolds (CFO)
- Products: Doughnut; pastries; kolaches; coffee
- Revenue: US$164 million
- Owner: Levine Leichtman Capital Partners
- Number of employees: 3,000 (2021)
- Website: shipleydonuts.com

Shipley Do-Nuts (colloquially known as Shipley's) is an American doughnut company and coffeehouse chain with more than 300 franchised stores in Texas, Oklahoma, Louisiana, Arkansas, Tennessee, Mississippi, Florida, Alabama, Maryland, and as of 2018, Colorado. Its headquarters are located in Northside, Houston, Texas.

== History ==
Shipley Do-Nuts was founded by Lawrence Shipley in 1936. When Shipley first created his recipe, his doughnuts were cut by hand, served warm during the day, and sold for $0.05 (equivalent to $1.16 in 2025) per dozen. Shipley and his family worked at their original bakery on 1417 Crockett Street in Houston, Texas. Shipley's goal was to continue selling hot doughnuts to customers. He said, "When they bite into that hot doughnut, it will bring them back every time".

Lawrence Shipley Jr. took over the business, and later still, Lawrence W. Shipley III became the president of the company. Today, the chain's headquarters remain in Houston, Texas, on 5200 North Main.

=== Growth ===
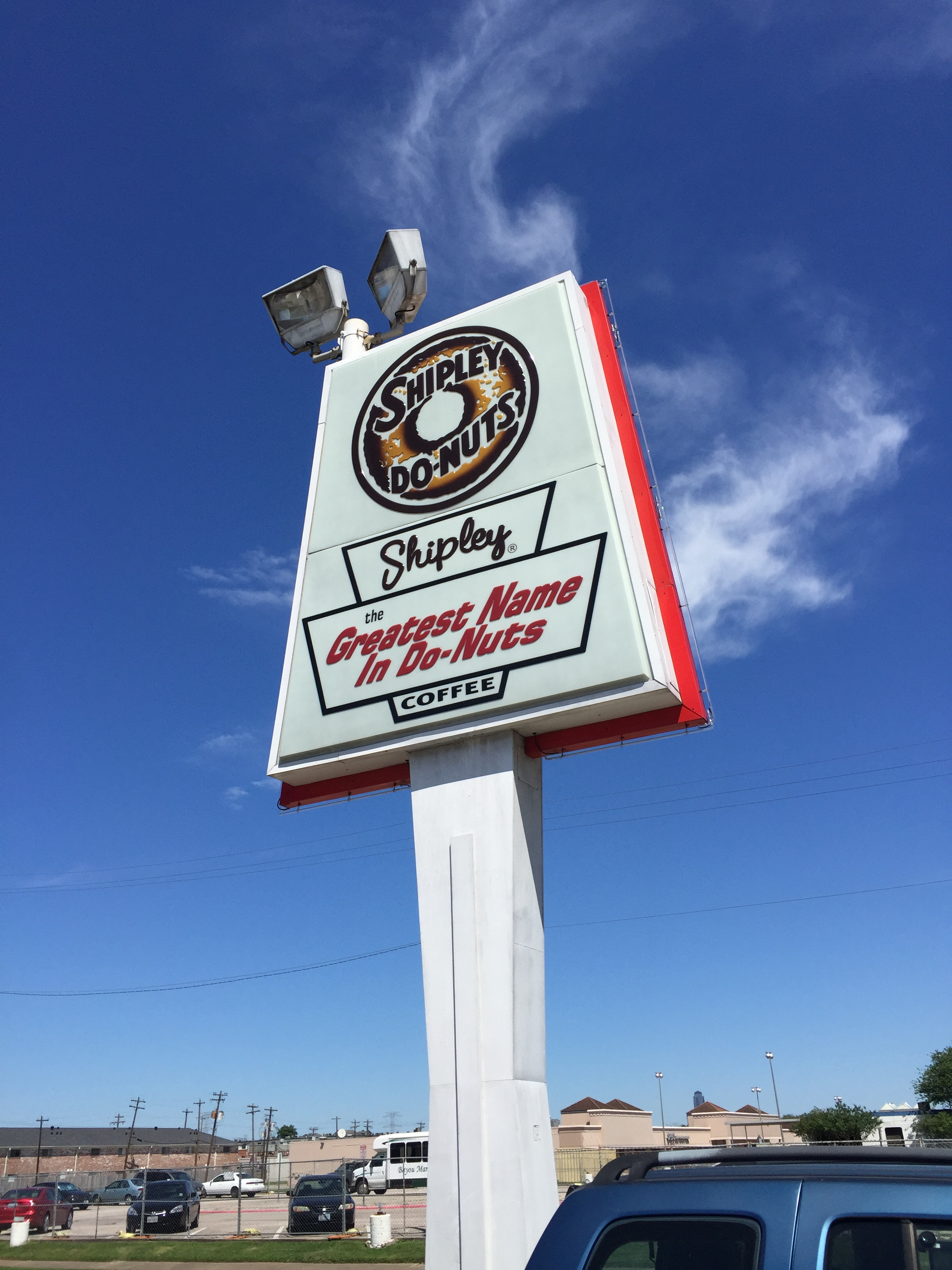
Shipley Do-Nuts Sign used as advertisements on freeways

During the late 2010s, Shipley Do-Nuts began a phase of rapid expansion. Shipley Do-Nuts' locations are based primarily in the Southern United States, but their imprint has been shifting further out. In 2018 the company debuted stores in Florida, Colorado and Oklahoma. In Florida, the first location opened in Bradenton. That year, they also opened the first Colorado location in Aurora in the Denver area. The second Colorado location opened in 2019 in Fountain in the Colorado Springs area.

=== Logo ===
The current company logo is derived from the original store's sign that consisted of a large, circular doughnut figure to inform customers they sold doughnuts. Since the original store began, the doughnut-shaped logo has been updated various times, but constantly kept the same theme. In its different updates, elements such as font, brightness, shading and sizing have been slightly changed over time. In the mid-2010s, the company attempted to implement an alternate logo, but it was short-lived.

=== Affiliations ===
Shipley Do-Nuts advertisement in Daikin Park

Shipley Do-Nuts has sponsored and maintained affiliations with the Houston Astros and University of Houston.

=== Notable endorsements ===
- Earl Campbell
- Kylie Jenner
- Lizzo
- Travis Scott

== Community involvement ==
The company has partnered with the Salvation Army to use a portion of sales on National Doughnut Day for charity. Starting in early 2015, Shipley Do-Nuts hosted an annual Shipley Do-Nut Dash fun run to benefit the Kids’ Meals Houston charity. The event raised funds to end hunger among pre-schoolers living in poverty in Houston and the surrounding area.

== Controversy and criticism ==
=== 2015 pregnancy discrimination lawsuit ===
In 2015, the Equal Employment Opportunity Commission (EEOC), charged a Shipley Do-Nuts franchisee for violating federal anti-discrimination laws when it forced an employee to take unpaid leave. The franchise owner/general manager prohibited the employee from working at the doughnut shop unless she provided documentation from a doctor that her pregnancy was not "high-risk". When the employee was unable to provide formal evidence of the doctor's release, she was fired, in violation of the Pregnancy Discrimination Act, part of Title VII of the Civil Rights Act of 1964. On 16 November 2015, a federal judge signed the consent decree that settled the suit which provided non-monetary relief.

=== 2017 overtime lawsuit ===
In April 2017, a lawsuit was filed against Shipley Do-Nuts contending that their employees were not getting overtime pay that they earned. The suit alleged that "All plaintiffs regularly worked over forty hours per week...Shipley's knew or reasonably should have known that plaintiffs worked in excess of forty hours per workweek." One employee, Juan Sanchez, claimed that he "put in 40–60 hours in a week with minimal breaks". However, he believed that Shipley Do-Nuts disregarded the overage and paid him for only 40 hours of work. The suit included claims that Shipley Do-Nuts did not maintain accurate records, failed to pay workers minimum wage, and did not pay overtime. Shipley Do-Nuts stated, "The claims by the former employees named in the lawsuit are unfounded, completely without merit and no more than a retaliation lawsuit against Shipley Do-Nuts and Lawrence Shipley III for their recent termination."

In 2025, Levine Leichtman Capital Partners acquired Shipley Do-nuts.

== Legacy ==
In 2018 Houston artist Donkee Boy created a Shipley Do-Nuts mural in a location along the Katy Freeway.

== See also ==
- Cuisine of Houston
