= Letty Guval =

American singer

Letty Guval-DeLuna
- Born: Letty Guval; 1974 (age 51–52); French Camp, California, United States
- Genre: Tejano
- Occupations: Vocalist, educator
- Instrument: Vocals
- Years active: 1994–1999
- Labels: A.B. Wick Records, Fonovisa Tejano
- Formerly of: Letty Guval y Xpresso

Letty Guval-DeLuna (born in 1974) is an American singer and educator. Guval-DeLuna became interested in music at an early age, often singing to farmworkers in Idaho. She joined her high school's mariachi band and took music classes while in college. She dropped out to pursue a career in Tejano music during the genre's height in popularity. After signing with a local independent label, Guval-DeLuna signed with Fonovisa Tejano. Her song, "Te Amaré a Escondidas", peaked at number 28 on the United States Billboard Hot Latin Songs chart. Guval-DeLuna performed at the White House during the Clinton administration for Hispanic Heritage Month.

At the 1995 Tejano Music Awards, she was nominated for Female Entertainer of the Year as well as Album of the Year. By 1999, Guval-DeLuna sought a new direction and moved to San Antonio, Texas. After her marriage to a pastor, she became interested in returning to college. She graduated from Del Mar College in 2020 and at Texas A&M University-Corpus Christi in 2022.

== Life and career ==
=== 1974–1993: Early life and career beginnings ===
Letty Guval-DeLuna was born in 1974 in French Camp, California and was raised in General Terán, Nuevo León. Her parents migrated to Caldwell, Idaho to work on beet farms. Guval-DeLuna began singing in Spanish at three years old, often using the field tools as a microphone, performing for the farmworkers. As a teenager, her family moved to the Rio Grande Valley. Guval-DeLuna joined her high school's mariachi group and performed at family events. She was accepted into the University of Texas Rio Grande Valley. She was instructed on vocal range through opera courses.

Guval-DeLuna was inspired by Rocio Durcal, Beatriz Adriana, Marisela, Ana Gabriel, Laura Canales, and Selena to become a professional singer. While in college, Guval-DeLuna passed out tapes of her songs, including to radio stations in Idaho. David Wicker became her manager after listening to her songs and watched her perform in Corpus Christi, Texas. After a wedding performance, Guval-DeLuna was approached for a recording contract. She signed with independent label A.B. Wick Records. She dropped out of college to pursue a career in Tejano music.

=== 1994 – 1998: Tejano music career ===
Guval-DeLuna moved to Corpus Christi in 1994, and released her debut album, Miles de Sueños. She released "Perdóname" and "Miles de Sueños" to support the album. In September 1994, Guval-DeLuna performed as a special guest with the University of Texas Pan American mariachi band for Congressman Kika de la Garza in Washington DC. In some local markets in Texas, "Perdóname" was the most-played song on radio stations. She participated in the Texas Talent Musician's Association Annual Tejano Hits and Music Festiball to help raise funds for scholarships, which were awarded to students at the 1995 Tejano Music Awards. At the 1995 Tejano Music Awards, Letty Guval y Grupo Xpresso received four nominations, including Most Promising Band, Female Entertainer of the Year, Album of the Year, and Record of the Year.

Fonovisa, a leading regional Mexican music label, formed Fonovisa Tejano to compete with other record companies at the height of Tejano music's popularity. Guval-DeLuna signed with Fonovisa Tejano in August 1995. Billboard's John Lannert and musicologist Ramiro Burr called Guval-DeLuna a "promising artist". Guval-DeLuna had been called "the Tejano Sweetheart" by Del Rio News-Herald. During the Clinton administration, she was invited to sing at the White House for Hispanic Heritage Month. In early 1996, Guval-DeLuna joined the Latin music division of the Society of European Stage Authors and Composers (SESAC) rights organization. In July 1996, she performed at the National Council of La Raza (NCLR) in an effort to push the Latino community to vote during the 1996 United States elections.

Following her appearance at the 1996 Tejano Music Awards, Lannert described the audience as being enthusiastic about Guval-DeLuna's performance. She released her third album, Tu Me Inspiras in November 1996. The album's single, "Te Amaré a Escondidas" debuted at number 31 on the US Billboard Hot Latin Songs chart, on the week ending December 28, 1996. It peaked at number 28 in its second week. According to KIWW, a Tejano station in Texas, "Te Amaré a Escondidas" was the third most-played song on their radio station.

Guval-DeLuna incorporated banda rhythms in her ranchera track "Sentimiento". Guadalupe San Miguel wrote in his book Tejano Proud (2002) that the tuba in the banda rhythms of "Sentimiento" was atypical of Tejano recordings. San Miguel analyzed "Sentimiento", along with other recordings by Tejano artists, for their incorporation of distinctive styles in Tejano songs without making them sound incongruent with the genre. At the 1997 Tejano Music Awards, Guval-DeLuna's "La Doce Rosa" and "Ya No Voy a Detenerte" were nominated for Music Video of the Year.

=== 1999 – present: Return to education ===
In 1999, Guval-DeLuna moved to San Antonio, Texas seeking a new direction. She married a pastor, had four children, became a Christian, and performed with the choir. Guval-DeLuna worked temporary jobs translating documents for local businesses. She found that it was difficult to be fully employed without a degree. Guval-DeLuna attended Del Mar College and graduated in fall 2020, after her father died earlier in the year.

At the 2021 All-Star Music Awards, Guval-DeLuna was nominated for Best Traditional Female Vocalist. Guval-DeLuna began performing with Mariachi De La Isla and graduated from Texas A&M University-Corpus Christi in 2022.

== Discography ==
- Miles de Sueños (1994)
- Amor de Mis Amores (1995)
- Tu Me Inspiras (1996)
- Soy Celosa (1997)

== Works cited ==
- Anon. (December 28, 1996). "Hot". Billboard. Vol. 108, no. 18.
- Anon. (December 28, 1996a). "Hot Latin Songs > December 28, 1996". Billboard. Vol. 108, no. 52.
- Anon. (July 3, 1996b). "NCLR Holds National Conference in Denver". Hispania News – via NewspaperArchives.com.
- Anon. (January 11, 1997). "Hot Latin Songs > January 11, 1997". Billboard. Vol. 109, no. 2.
- Anon. (August 29, 2025). "Tejano Nights at Whataburger". Whataburger.com.
- Burr, Ramiro (September 2, 1995). "New Players At Work". Billboard. Vol. 107, no. 35.
- Buttler, Luisa (December 8, 2022). "Mariachi De La Isla Member Letty Guval-DeLuna Realizes Dream to Finish Degree at Island University". Texas A&M University-Corpus Christi.
- Garcia, Gus (July 10, 1994). "Notas Musicales". Del Rio News-Herald – via NewspaperArchives.com.
- Garcia, Gus (July 10, 1994a). "Guval Featured at Capitol". Del Rio News-Herald – via NewspaperArchives.com.
- Garcia, Gus (October 23, 1994b). "Tejano Stars Team-up For Education". Del Rio News-Herald – via NewspaperArchives.com.
- Garcia, Gus (December 18, 1994c). "And the Nominees Are". Del Rio News-Herald – via NewspaperArchives.com.
- Jinaink (February 21, 2021). "Third annual All-Star Music Awards set for May 29, reveals Top 10 in each category". Tejano Nation.
- Lannert, John (April 6, 1996). "Tejano Music Awards: Bigger, But Not Necessarily Better". Billboard. Vol. 108, no. 14.
- Lannert, John; Burr, Ramiro (August 17, 1996). "Regional Mexican Music". Billboard. Vol. 108, no. 33.
- Maldonado, Vilma (January 19, 1997). "Guval Watching Her Star Rise". Brownsville Herald – via NewspaperArchives.com.
- Maldonado, Vilma (January 19, 1997a). "La Onda". Brownsville Herald – via NewspaperArchives.com.
- San Miguel, Guadalupe (2002). Tejano proud: Tex-Mex music in the twentieth century (1st ed.). Texas A&M University Press. ISBN 9781585441884.
