= Brown, Not White =

2005 book by Guadalupe San Miguel

Brown, Not White: School Integration and the Chicano Movement in Houston
- Title page for Brown, Not White: School Integration and the Chicano Movement in Houston
- Author: Guadalupe San Miguel
- Publisher: Texas A&M University Press
- Publication date: 2005

Brown, Not White: School Integration and the Chicano Movement in Houston is a 2005 book by Guadalupe San Miguel, Jr., published by the Texas A&M University Press. Brown, Not White discusses Chicano activism in Houston, Texas during the 20th century.

It is the third volume in the University of Houston (UH) Series in Mexican American Studies, sponsored by the UH Center of Mexican American Studies. Dr. Tatcho Mindiola Jr. sponsored this publication series.

== Contents ==
Part one discusses the development of the Mexican-American community of Houston from 1900-1960. This section discusses how Hispanic activists of the day sought to have Hispanics classified as White Americans. Specifically chapter 1 discusses the Hispanic community prior to World War II, and chapter 2 discusses Mexican children in the schools and how they were affected by educational policies. Chapter 3 discusses efforts from Hispanic individuals to reform the school system. Chapter 4 documents debates on how to reform the education system that took place within the Hispanic community.

Part two describes the campaign for the Hispanic community to be recognized as a non-white minority, rather than white, in regards to a Houston Independent School District (HISD) desegregation plan. In its initial 1970 desegregation plan, HISD was trying to "desegregate" by mixing black and Mexican students together while not including Anglo Whites in the desegregation plan, and using the Mexican students' designation as "white" as a workaround. Mexicans responded by launching a strike, or huelga, against HISD.

Part three goes into detail regarding movements to classify Mexican-Americans as being a part of the racial minority groups. The book discusses the efforts of the Mexican American Educational Council (MAEC), an organization fighting HISD's original desegregation program, to be recognized by HISD and the court system.

José M. Alamillo of Washington State University wrote that "[o]ne of the most important contributions" of this book was saying that men and women of varying social classes and ages were central to the Chicano movement, rather than Carlos Muñoz's statements saying that students were central to the movement.

Rodolfo Rosales of the University of Texas at San Antonio described chapters 5-7, which discuss the Mexican community's implementation of the school reform movement, as the "heart of the narrative".

== Background ==
San Miguel previously wrote "Let All of Them Take Heed": Mexican Americans and the Campaign for Educational Equality in Texas, 1910-1981, described by Thomas H. Kreneck of Texas A&M University-Corpus Christi as "an important history of Mexican American educational reform in the Lone Star State".

San Miguel encountered information on the huelgas while researching the history of Houston's education system and decided to write a book about the subject.

San Miguel used information from the Houston Metropolitan Research Center for this book.

== Reception ==
Alamillo wrote that the book "contributes significantly to the history of Chicano movement and school desegregation in the American West" and he recommended that teachers, community activists, and officials in school systems read the book. He argued that the author should have more fully explored racial conflicts between blacks and Hispanics.

Barbara J. Shircliffe of the University of South Florida wrote that the author "greatly contributes to our understanding of the influence of the Chicano movement on local school activism among a broad group of Mexican Americans during the period." She suggested that the author could have added more information regarding Mexican-Black relations, especially regarding local politics and educational politics.

Gilbert G. Gonzalez of the University of California, Irvine wrote that the author "examines and analyzes" the history "so well".

Kreneck wrote that the book was "strong" but that it should have included a bibliography and acknowledgments section.

Anthony Quiroz of TAMU Corpus Christi wrote that the book is "a fascinating and important account of the Chicano huelga in Houston" and he also stated that it could have benefited from more deeply discussing Black-Hispanic tensions.

Rosales supported how the author "made a conscious choice to provide an illuminating story where he provided more direction than analysis" but he added that sometimes the author provided "too much detail, which tended to clog, so to speak, the analysis."

== See also ==
- History of Mexican Americans in Houston
- Huelga schools (Houston)

Other books by San Miguel:

- Tejano Proud

Non-fiction about Mexican-Americans in Houston:

- The Church in the Barrio
- Ethnicity in the Sunbelt

Fiction about Mexican-Americans in Houston:

- What Can't Wait
