= Ethnicity in the Sunbelt =

1989 book by Arnoldo De León

Ethnicity in the Sunbelt: A History of Mexican Americans in Houston
- Author: Arnoldo De León
- Genre: Historical non-fiction
- Published: 1989
- Publisher: Mexican American Studies Program, University of Houston
- Publication place: United States

Ethnicity in the Sunbelt: A History of Mexican Americans in Houston is a 1989 book written by Arnoldo De León and published by the Mexican American Studies Program, University of Houston.

The author discusses the development of Mexican-American culture in Houston, covering the entire history but with a focus on the 20th Century. The book also discusses the change of the Mexican-American ethnic identity in the history of the population. The author stated that LULAC and the middle class of the 1930s and 1940s argued for preserving the Mexican ethnicity but also becoming Mexican Americans. Joseph A. Rodriguez of the University of Wisconsin–Milwaukee wrote that the book, along with several others by other authors, was made to illustrate that Mexican-Americans were bicultural and to counter the 1960s Chicano sentiment against assimilation. According to the author, this was the first book published about the Mexican-Americans of the city.

Mauricio Mazon of the University of Southern California (USC) wrote that the book covers "a conscious movement toward the incorporation of the American dream, especially in terms of its economic and political potential" and at the same time "shows how the ethos of lo mexicano was sustained as a cultural symbol". Richard A. Garcia of Santa Monica College wrote that the book author argued that the changes in American society in its history were "dialectically intertwined" with that of the Mexican-American community in particular and that the latter did not exist in a vacuum.

Mario T. García of Yale University wrote that De León, "unlike other historians, has given us a greater sense of how Mexicans have changed in time in a particular urban setting."

The UH Mexican-American Studies Center and Texas A&M University Press together published a new edition in 2001 that reflected updated historiography.

== Background ==
De León, at the time working at the Center for Mexican American Studies at the University of Houston as a visiting scholar, researched the book from 1986 through 1987. The center created a Visiting Scholars Monographs Program, and this was the first book published in that program.

== Reception ==
Mario García wrote that the book was a "significant" and "ambitious" book, and one that "will be a useful model for others to use in discerning the various changes which Mexicans have undergone in other urban settings." Mario García argued that the book should have focused more on social history and had too much of a focus on political history, and by focusing more on social history the information on women and working classes could have been made more prominent.

Mazon wrote that the book, "a richness and mastery of sources that is compelling", "further establishes De Leon's position in the forefront of Chicano historians, and certainly at the top of Chicano historians of Téjanos".

Richard Garcia wrote that the book "is an excellent example of a study of ethnicity within the emerging reality of Sun Belt politics where community emerges as a metaphor for biculturalism."

== See also ==
- History of Mexican Americans in Houston

Non-fiction about Mexican-Americans in Houston:

- Brown, Not White
- The Church in the Barrio

Fiction about Mexican-Americans in Houston:

- What Can't Wait
