= Birdlife of Houston, Galveston, and the Upper Texas Coast =

- Author: Ted L. Eubanks Jr.
- Language: English
- Genre: Non-fiction
- Publisher: Texas A&M University Press
- Publication date: 2006
- Pages: 328
- OCLC: 748928777

Birdlife of Houston, Galveston, and the Upper Texas Coast is a 2006 book by Ted L. Eubanks Jr., Robert A. Behrstock, and Ron J. Weeks, published by the Texas A&M University Press. The book discusses birds found in seven Texas counties, although the content extends into other counties as human political boundaries do not often define natural regions. Victor Emanuel wrote the book's foreword.

== Contents ==
The book begins with its acknowledgements. The first section of Birdlife of Houston, Galveston, and the Upper Texas Coast discusses the history of bird observation in and around Houston and in the Upper Texas Coast. The following portions discuss the geography of the subject region of and the reasons why the bird species are located there. Different topics each have their own sections, such as bird migration, including the fallouts; climate; geology; habitats; hazards; and exotic species and species detrimental to others.

Located after the introduction, the largest section gives individual profiles of each bird in the region.

The book has 50 photographs, in color, at the end of the book's introductory portion, depicting the birds and their habitats. The book features maps and tables, as well as a bibliography. Over 480 species are chronicled, with each generally having one half of a page or less of content. Profiles discuss historical observations, habitats, seasonal occurrences, and the local statuses of the birds. The book is about 8.5 inches (220 mm) by 11.25 inches (286 mm).

Jane Manaster, who reviewed the book for Texas Books in Review, stated that the bird profiles are "written in layman's lingo" and "concise" and that they "a good introduction or reminder" of the birds in the region. She argued that the photographs were "regrettably not displayed as well as they deserve". She described the bibliography as "extensive". Michael S. Husak of Cameron University wrote that the book's size makes it difficult to carry during any trips to observe birds.

== Reception ==
Manaster concluded that the book is "a spectacular contribution".

Husak wrote that the book "will serve as an indispensable reference for professionals and amateur birders with an interest in the avifauna of this region."
