= "Let All of Them Take Heed" =

1987 book by Guadalupe San Miguel, Jr.

"Let All of Them Take Heed": Mexican Americans and the Campaign for Educational Equality in Texas, 1910–1981
- Title page for "Let All of Them Take Heed": Mexican Americans and the Campaign for Educational Equality in Texas, 1910–1981 (1987)
- Author: Guadalupe San Miguel, Jr.
- Publisher: University of Texas Press
- Publication date: 1987

"Let All of Them Take Heed": Mexican Americans and the Campaign for Educational Equality in Texas, 1910–1981 is a non-fiction book by Guadalupe San Miguel, Jr., published by University of Texas Press in 1987. Let All of Them Take Heed argues that Mexican Americans in the period saw education as central to success in the United States, with participation in League of United Latin American Citizens being key evidence. The book argues against the idea that the ethnic group did not place value in education. According to Richard A. Garcia of Santa Monica College, "Let All of Them Take Heed" "is the first major work to give credence to the reality of a strong Mexican American civil rights movement[...]"

== Contents ==
In the final chapter of the book, San Miguel discusses how efforts by civil rights organizations were thwarted.

== Reception ==
Garcia wrote that this work is "a study worth reading".

Ruth Horowitz of the University of Delaware described it as a "highly textured study". She described it as important, though she felt the central ideas should have been better explained.

== See also ==
- Brown, Not White - Another book by San Miguel
- Tejano Proud - Another book by San Miguel
- History of Mexican Americans in Texas
