= Mexilink =

- Founded: May, 1999
- Headquarters: Houston, Texas

Mexilink Inc. is a distributor of Mexican products headquartered in Houston, Texas. As of 2009 Salvador Escalona is the CEO.

Mexilink opened in May 1999 with an initial investment of $300,000 ($570,000 when adjusted for inflation). The first brand the company imported was Dolores. Escalona saw another advertisement from another company's branded tuna, which described that company's product as the second most popular in Mexico. The most popular, from Dolores, was not sold in the United States. Escalona traveled to the Dolores headquarters in Mazatlán and offered to have Dolores's goods sold in the United States. Dolores agreed to the deal. After Mexilink opened, Tajín, a seller of seasonings, agreed to have its products distributed by Mexilink.

Mexilink turned a profit in 2000, and it made its first one million dollars ($1.8 million when adjusted for inflation) in 2001. In 2002 the company had $4.3 million ($7.5 million when adjusted for inflation) in sales. This increased to $21.9 million ($34.2 million when adjusted for inflation) in 2006. Around 2007 Entrepreneur ranked Mexilink #210 in its listing of Hot 500 Companies. Mexilink had $29 million ($42.4 million when adjusted for inflation) in revenue in 2008, and it expected to make more than $40 million in 2009 ($58.6 million when adjusted for inflation). In the late 2000s the company provided bilingual marketing materials for grocery stores to mainstream brands.

As of 2009 the products exported by the company include Dolores brand canned tuna fish, Encanto branded corn chips, Tajín branded spices, and Veladora Mexico religious candles.

Encanto said that the business is doing well because of the Mexican American immigrants into the United States, who form the core group of consumers of the products distributed by Mexilink.

== See also ==
- History of the Mexican-Americans in Houston
- RioStar Corp.
