= Taqueria Arandas =

Chain of Mexican restaurants in Greater Houston, Texas

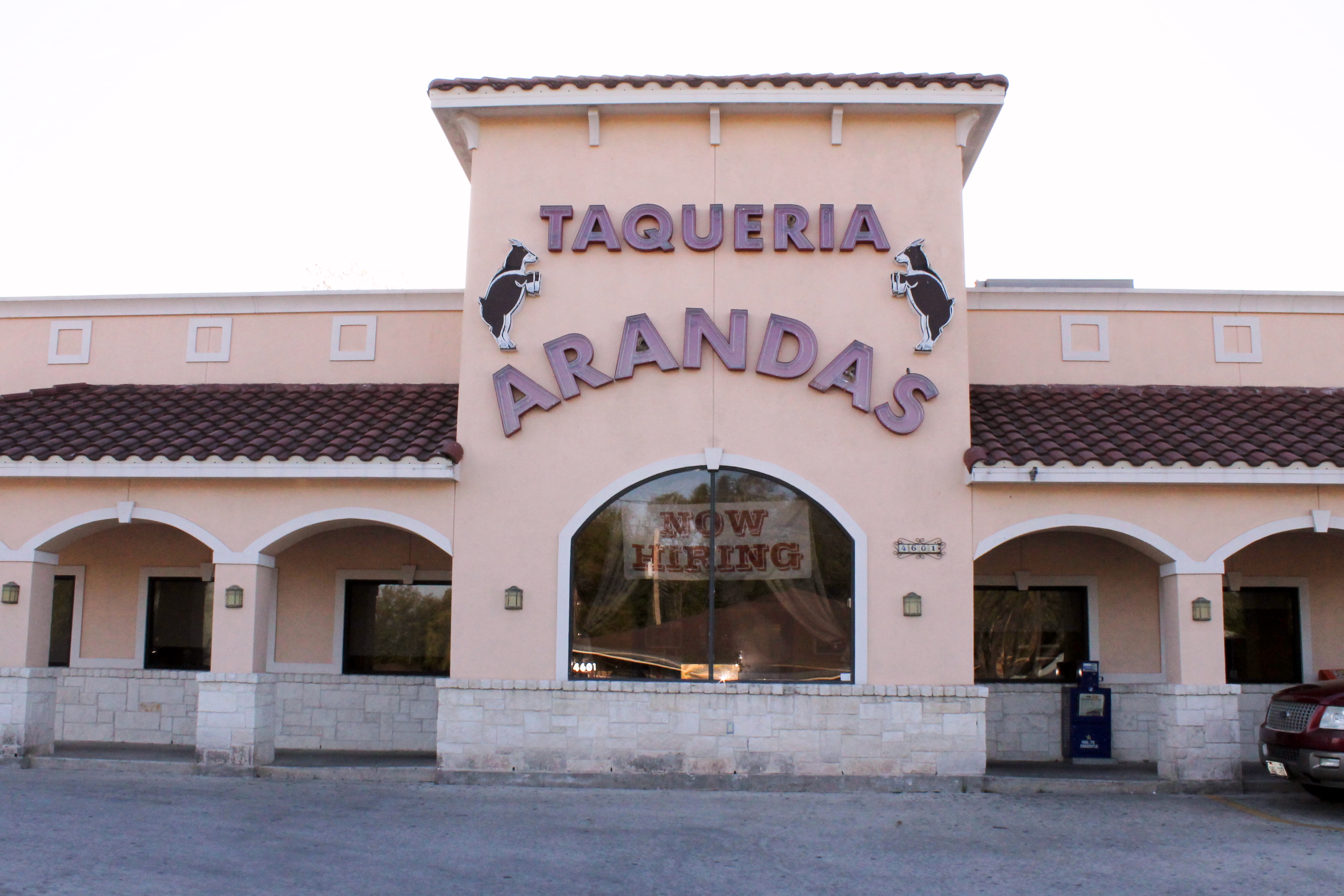
The original location of Taqueria Arandas, which opened on Irvington Drive in Houston in the early 1980s.

Taqueria Arandas is a chain of Mexican restaurants in Greater Houston, Texas. The first location opened in Houston's Northside in 1981. The corporate headquarters is located in Houston.

As of March 2014 the Taqueria Arandas chain makes $40 million per year. As of that month the chain has 44 taquerias, three Arandas Bakery, and one Ostionerias Arandas seafood restaurants.

The menus show images of a church from his hometown in Mexico, and every restaurant has a photograph of Jesus Christ. These aspects reflect the religiousness of the founder.

== History ==
Jose Camarena was born in the outskirts of Jesús María in the Los Altos region of Jalisco, Mexico. Camarena started a taqueria chain shortly after arriving in Houston in 1980. He had lived in Chicago for two prior years, learning about the operations of Mexican restaurants. According to Camarena, he used $5,000 to buy a taco truck and start his own business in Houston. He started a fast food Mexican restaurant because Houston had very few of them at the time. He had pawned most of his belongings so he could start the restaurant.

The first Taqueria Arandas restaurant was on Irvington Boulevard. Judy Camarena, the second daughter of Jose Camarena, stated that the owners did not give much thought or time in making a unified approach to all restaurants because the chain "grew so fast". The first bakery opened on Airline Drive in 1991. The first seafood restaurants followed.

In 2004 Jose gave the management of the restaurants to Judy so he could concentrate in his other interests. In 2006 the chain was worth $42 million and had 36 taquerias, four bakeries, and two seafood restaurants. That year, both father and daughter lived in the same house in Memorial.

Jose Camarena died in March 2014.

== See also ==
- History of the Mexican-Americans in Houston
- Tex-Mex in Houston
