= La Gaceta Mexicana =

Spanish language newspaper

- Type: Semi-monthly
- Founder: José Sarabia
- Founded: 1927
- Language: Spanish
- City: Houston, Texas
- Country: United States

La Gaceta Mexicana was a free, twice-monthly Spanish-language newspaper published in Houston, Texas. It was one of the earliest Mexican-American newspapers in Houston.

La Gaceta Mexicana attempted to foster a communal Mexican identity in its readers. Through editorials and special sections, editor José Sarabia argued for readers to support Mexican-owned businesses and teach their children Mexican history. La Gaceta also functioned as a cultural resource, providing calendars of events, recipes, book excerpts, and updates about Mexican entertainers.

== History ==
José Sarabia founded the paper in 1927. The first issue was released on February 15, 1927. Part of a family of entrepreneurs, José printed the paper at the Sarabia family print shop. Sarabia siblings Socorro, Felipe, and Jesus joined José as co-owners of the paper. José's tenure as editor was brief—by the middle of 1928 he had hired Luis Yañez to take over the role. However, José would continue to write the paper's editorials until the paper's close.

Sarabia's editorials centered around creating a unified Mexican identity. Like many Mexican residents of Houston at the time, Sarabia ended up in the United States due to political exile. Many of his editorials assumed that Mexicans living in the United States would inevitably return to Mexico. He argued that Mexicans living in the U.S. needed to maintain their connections to their homeland, criticizing those who he believed had "Americanized" themselves and their children.

The paper was funded through paid advertisements of local businesses, including businesses that were not Mexican-owned, so long as they met the paper's criteria of being respectful and welcoming to Mexican customers. When advertisements didn't completely cover the cost of the paper, José Sarabia personally covered the shortfall. However, the Great Depression, cut deeper into advertisement revenue, forcing the paper to end publication.

== See also ==
- History of the Mexican-Americans in Houston
