= Refugio Gómez =

American community leader (1905–1988)

Refugio Gómez (July 4, 1905 – 1988) was a community leader in Houston.

He was born on July 4, 1905, in Aguascalientes, Mexico. He started the Sociedad Mutualista Obrera Mexicana (SMOM, "Mexican Worker's Mutual Aid Society"), a mutual aid society in the Second Ward, in 1932; at the time he worked as a welder in the Houston Ship Channel. His friend, Jesús Sanchez, was killed after being hit by a truck. Friends and neighbors collected funds for a burial for Sanchez, and in light of this Gómez decided that there should be a permanent fund for emergencies. SMOM was Houston's second mutual-aid society. Gómez was initially elected as a secretary, and he remained a member for the rest of his life. He married his second wife in 1939. He belonged to other mutual aid societies, such as Sociedad Moctezuma, Sociedad Morelos, and the Unión Fraternal. He was active in Democratic Party politics and campaigned to register Mexican Americans to vote. He retired from his job as a ship engineer in 1975. He died in 1988.

== See also ==
- History of the Mexican Americans in Houston
