= The Church in the Barrio =

2006 book by Roberto R. Treviño

The Church in the Barrio: Mexican American Ethno-Catholicism in Houston
- Author: Roberto R. Treviño
- Publisher: University of North Carolina Press
- Publication date: 2006

The Church in the Barrio: Mexican American Ethno-Catholicism in Houston is a 2006 book by Roberto R. Treviño, published by the University of North Carolina Press. The work covers the years 1911-1972 and discusses the relationship between the Mexican-American community and the Catholic church, and the "ethno-Catholicism" among Houston's Mexicans. This ethno-Catholism consisted of the cultural interaction between Irish American priests, religious practices of the indigenous Mexicans, and Mexican customs.

Mary E. Odem of Emory University wrote that "According to Trevino, ethno-Catholicism was more than a set of religious beliefs and practices; it was a way of life that sustained generations of Mexicans and Mexican Americans in Houston". José F. Aranda Jr. of Rice University wrote that "From beginning to end, Treviño demonstrates why Houston should no longer remain virtually neglected by Chicano/a researchers." Michael P. Carroll of the University of Western Ontario argued that the book's title did not adequately cover the entire scope of the subject; Carroll characterized this as a "mild complaint".

== Background ==
Treviño grew up in Houston within the Mexican community. He is an associate professor of history at the University of Texas at Arlington, where he works as the Center for Mexican American Studies assistant director. Treviño is a Presbyterian. The book originated as a Stanford University PhD dissertation.

Treviño's sources for the book include church archival material and records, located in Houston, Austin, and San Antonio in Texas and in Chicago. The archives include parish records. Other sources include family papers; oral histories; organizational papers; unpublished letters, religious and secular newspapers, including Catholic newspapers and Spanish-language newspapers; and eighteen interviews. Laura Premack of the University of North Carolina-Chapel Hill stated that the sourcing's "breadth and depth are one of the book’s major strengths."

F. Arturo Rosales of Arizona State University stated that the book was the first published book to use "a micro-methodology" to examine the Catholic church relationship with Mexican Americans.

== Contents ==
The book includes the chapters, an index, a bibliography, illustrations, and notes. The illustrations include 21 photographs, four maps, and three tables.

John Barnhill, an independent scholar from Houston, stated "The style is lucid and interesting, making the work accessible to scholars and lay people alike." Premack stated "the overall clarity and readability of the prose" is a positive for the book.

Carroll stated that "What I consistently found impressive about the analysis presented in this book is that Treviño refuses to succumb to the temptation to think in terms of simple dichotomies."

Treviño perceived similarities within Mexican ethno-Catholicism and Italian American (of Southern Italy) ethno-Catholicism. Carroll wrote "I can not recall anyone making this point as precisely as Treviño." Carlos Kevin Blanton of Texas A&M University stated "While perhaps outside the study’s focus, this intriguing connection haunts the pages for a more sustained analysis." Treviño also compares the Catholicism of Cuban Americans and Puerto Ricans in the 50 States and Washington DC to the Catholicism of Mexican Americans.

=== Chapters ===
The book uses thematic chapters, which Todd Kerstetter of Texas Christian University stated "function almost as a collection of essays", as opposed to a narrative. There are seven main chapters, each having a particular topic. Most chapters cover the book's entire time period.

The first chapter documents the beginning of the Houston Mexican community and the evolution of Catholicism in the Mexican community. Premack stated that the chapter had "remarkably clear historical background" and that it "could be quite useful for teaching undergraduates".

In order, the remaining chapters discuss ethno-Catholicism itself, poverty, the expansion of the Catholic church, the Mexican-American identity and the commitment to the faith, social action, and the Chicano movement. Some of the subsequent chapters are specifically dedicated to Mexican-Catholic church relations. Kerstetter added that "Parts, especially those covering the most recent events, read more like anthropology than history. Readers looking for theology will not find much here, but they will find solid social history."

The epilogue covers the post-1970s period. Kerstetter stated "The epilogue surveys how the book's themes fared during the last three decades of the twentieth century." The chapter topics include an increase in evangelical Protestantism in the Hispanic and Latino world, an increase in immigration from Latin America, and a decrease in political power of left-wing movements. Carroll stated that the author "suggests" that since the 1960s and early 1970s Mexican-American influence declined due to the increased categorizing of their pastoral and social issues into "a more general (and vague) concern with multiculturalism" and Mexican concerns being "increasingly subsumed" into pan-Hispanic concerns. Carroll stated that this occurred despite the fact that "Mexican American ethno-Catholicism itself remains vibrant".

== Reception ==
Blanton concluded that the book "seldom disappoints" and that it "describes Mexican American Catholicism in all its fascinating, vibrant dimensions and offers a perceptive, sophisticated, and balanced interpretation of the subject in one of the nation’s largest cities." Blanton stated that the author needed to further explain the comparison between Mexican and Italian ethno-Catholicism and that the author "neglects the ideological framework of Mexican Americans from the 1930s to the 1960s", but Blanton believed that the issues "do not diminish the book’s excellence."

Carroll concluded that "This is, quite simply, one of the best books that I have read on the Catholic experience in America, and I recommend it highly."

John T. Ford of the Catholic University of America stated that the book is an "admirably researched study" that "not only provides an informative and interesting account of Mexican Americans and the Roman Catholic Church in Houston, but also could well serve as an excellent model for similar case studies elsewhere."

Kristy Nabhan-Warren of Augustana College wrote that "Overall, this is a finely wrought portrait of Mexican American lived religion that makes important and substantial contributions to scholarship on U.S. Catholicism, Mexican American history, ethnic and urban studies, and American religious history."

Odem stated "Roberto R. Trevino makes a welcome contribution to Chicano history".

Premack believed that "the good treatment of gender" was another positive; she wrote that she wanted additional exploration of "the fascinating tension between inclusion and outsiderness" and relations between the Mexican-American Evangelical and ethno-Catholic "identities".

Gene B. Preuss of the University of Houston–Downtown stated that the book "is well written" and "makes an excellent companion to" the 2001 book Ethnicity in the Sunbelt: A History of Mexican Americans in Houston by Arnoldo De León.

Barnhill wrote: "In sum, the work brings back a neglected aspect of Houston history and adds to the knowledge about the Mexican-American community in the United States."

== See also ==
- History of Mexican Americans in Houston

Non-fiction about Mexican-Americans in Houston:

- Brown, Not White
- Ethnicity in the Sunbelt

Fiction about Mexican Americans in Houston:

- What Can't Wait
