= Magnolia Park, Houston =

Area of Houston, Texas, U.S.

Coordinates: 29.736°N 95.291°W

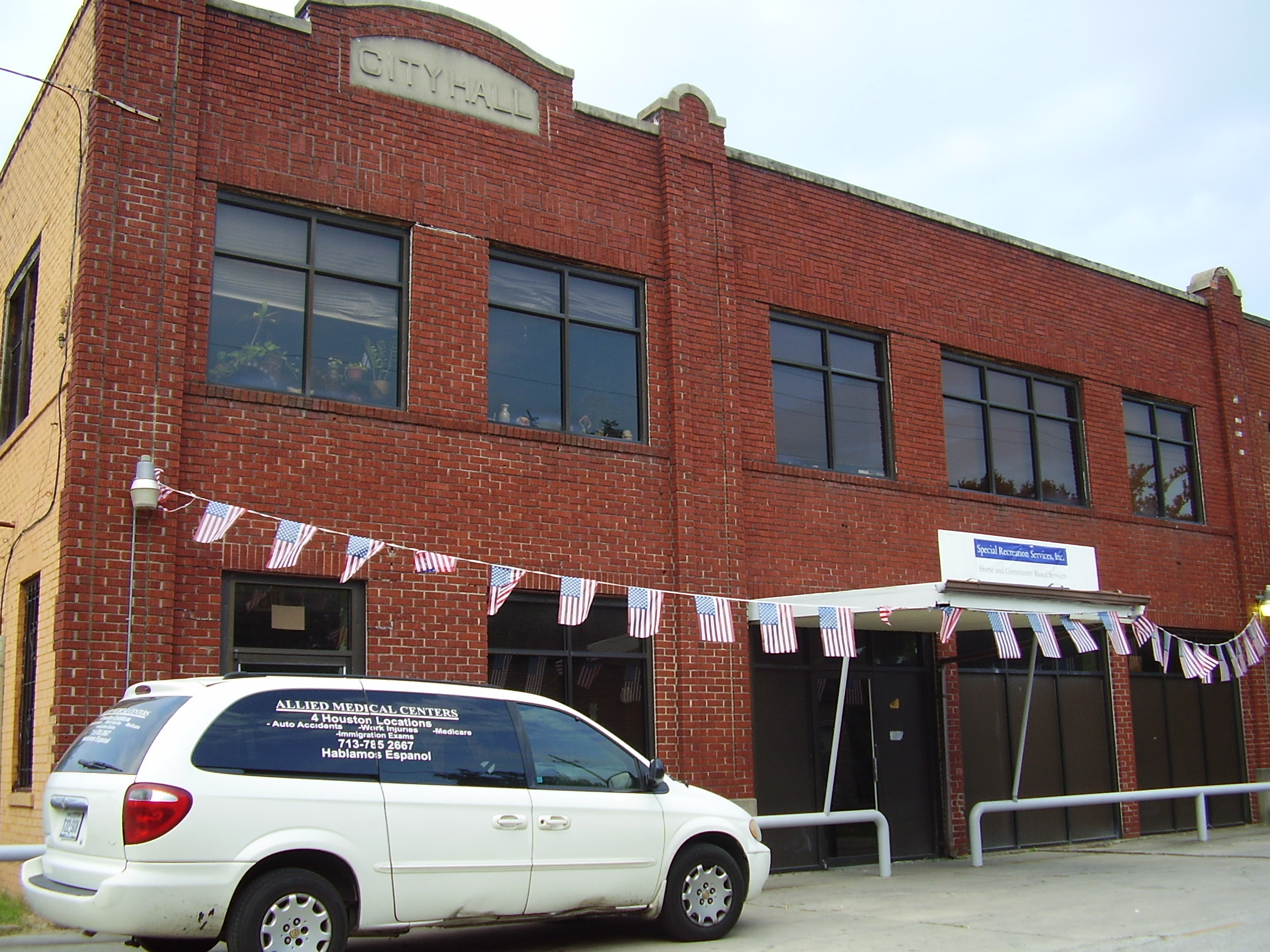
The former city hall of Magnolia Park

Magnolia Park (Spanish: Parque Magnolia), often referred to as simply Magnolia by residents, a neighborhood in the East End, Houston, Texas, and constitutes the city-designated Super Neighborhood 82. One of the oldest Hispanic neighborhoods in the City of Houston, Magnolia Park was formerly incorporated as the City of Magnolia Park in eastern Harris County. The western half of what is now considered the Magnolia area was formerly a separate development named Central Park. It is bound to the north and east by the Houston Ship Channel, to the south by Brays Bayou, and to the west by railroad tracks. It is north of Old Harrisburg and east of Second Ward. It is northeast of Eastwood.

== History ==
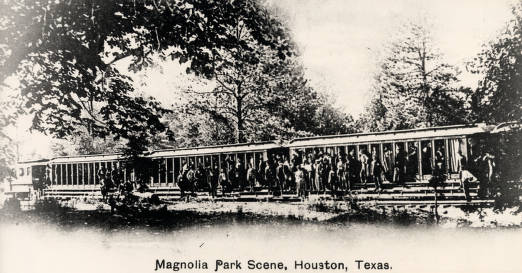
Magnolia Park in the 1890s

In 1890 Magnolia Park was laid out on a 1,374-acre (556 ha) site on Harrisburg Road across Brays Bayou from Harrisburg and 7 miles (11 km) downstream from Houston. The plot was owned by Thomas M. Brady, and the community was named for the 3,750 magnolias planted by developers. The Magnolia Park community was organized in 1909. The city incorporated in 1913, even having its own police force.

Magnolia Park on a map of the Houston area in 1913

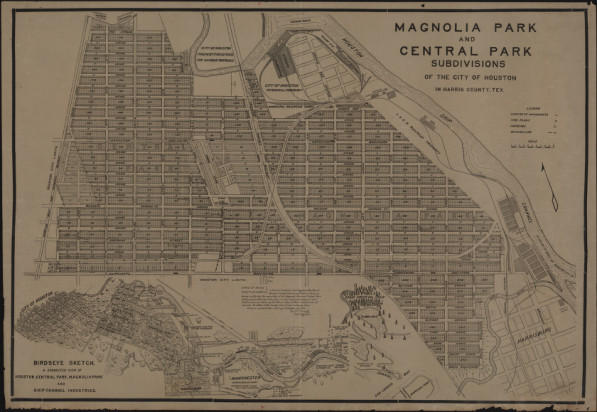
Magnolia Park and Central Park subdivisions, Houston, Texas (circa 1918)

Magnolia Park originally had non-Hispanic White Americans. Mexican-Americans from South Texas started to settle in Magnolia Park in 1911. By the 1920s, many Mexicans fleeing the Mexican Revolution settled in Magnolia Park. The construction of the Houston Ship Channel and area industries attracted Mexicans. They worked in different fields depending on their gender, with women working in factories, stores, and textile plants and men in working in industries such as construction and maintenance of the Ship Channel, cotton compresses and cement plants.

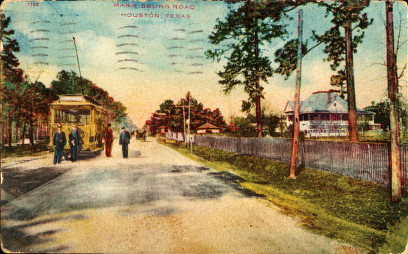
Harrisburg Road, Houston, Texas (postcard, circa 1910) (street car)

Canal Street in Magnolia Park was originally known as "German Street." Circa 1918 it was renamed "Belgium Street" in honor of a country invaded by Germany in World War I. At a later point the name was harmonized with that of the section in the pre-merger City of Houston, known as Canal Street.

Magnolia Park was annexed to Houston in October 1926. The Mexican community stayed centered in Magnolia Park partly due to discrimination from elements of the Anglo community. By 1926 Magnolia Park was called "Little Mexico" by Anglo residents of Houston. Its business district had businesses such as restaurants, grocery stores, barber shops, bakeries, drugstores, and gasoline stations. By 1929 it was the largest Mexican settlement in Houston.

A League of United Latin American Citizens (LULAC) branch was organized in 1934. In 1935 a Ladies LULAC council was organized. By the 1930s political organizations such as the Club Femenino-Chapultepec had been established to protest segregation, promote Mexican-American culture, and provide recreation. By the World War II period Magnolia Park was considered to be within the East End. Due to the war, Mexican-Americans in the Southwestern United States were drawn to Houston for jobs, and so the local population increased. By the time of World War II youth gangs were active in Magnolia Park.

By the 1960s most Mexican-Americans in Magnolia Park were poor, and the middle class in Magnolia Park had expanded due to programs established by President of the United States Lyndon Baines Johnson. The Magnolia Park YWCA's women hosted the Conferencia de Mujeres por la Raza in 1971. The percentage of the residents below the poverty line in 1978 was up to 20%. When the 1980s oil bust occurred, fifty factories in and around Magnolia Park closed due to the drop in oil prices, causing thousands of Mexicans to lose their jobs. Magnolia Park had 14,000 residents in 1990. The Magnolia Park community celebrated the neighborhood's 100 year anniversary on October 17, 2009.

Many of the Historical Buildings are still there and can be seen throughout all of Harrisburg and Canal St.

Magnolia Park has largely been excluded from the wave of gentrification that began in the East End in the 1990s; instead the neighborhood was ranked as highest on the "Social Vulnerability Scale" in Harris County, with 21% of residents living in poverty.

Lorenzo Salgado Araujo was killed by ICE agents in Magnolia in July 2026.

== Cityscape ==
In the 1920s the surrounding area had factories, industrial plants, refineries, textile mills, and wharves, giving employment opportunities to area residents.

During the period including the 1950s and 1960s, writer Sigman Byrd wrote about the intersection of 75th Street (nicknamed "Six-Bit Street") and Canal Street; Byrd reported that a local had called Canal "Canine Street" because the environment was "dog-eat-dog."

== Government and infrastructure ==
Magnolia Park is in Houston City Council District I.

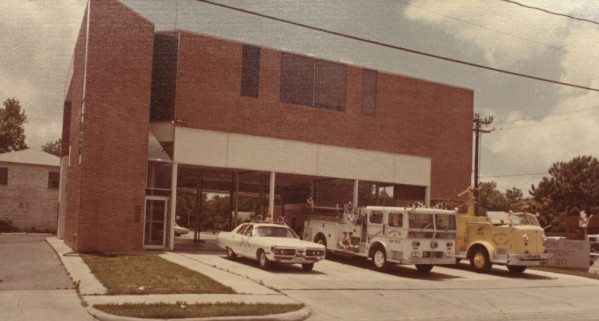
Fire Station 20, 1976

The City of Houston operates the Magnolia Multi-Service Center.

The Harris Health System (formerly Harris County Hospital District) designated the Ripley Health Center for the ZIP codes 77011 and 77012. In 2000 Ripley was replaced by the Gulfgate Health Center. The designated public hospital is Ben Taub General Hospital in the Texas Medical Center.

== Demographics ==
In 2015 the City of Houston-defined Magnolia Park Super Neighborhood had 16,999 residents. 95% were Hispanic, 3% were non-Hispanic white, and 1% was non-Hispanic black. The percentages of non-Hispanic Asians and others were both zero. In 2000 the super neighborhood had 21,302 residents. 96% were Hispanic, 3% were non-Hispanic white, and 1% was non-Hispanic black. The percentages of non-Hispanic Asians and others were both zero.

== Media ==
In the 1970s Papel Chicano, a newspaper that reported on activism in the Houston area, had its offices in Magnolia Park.

== Education ==
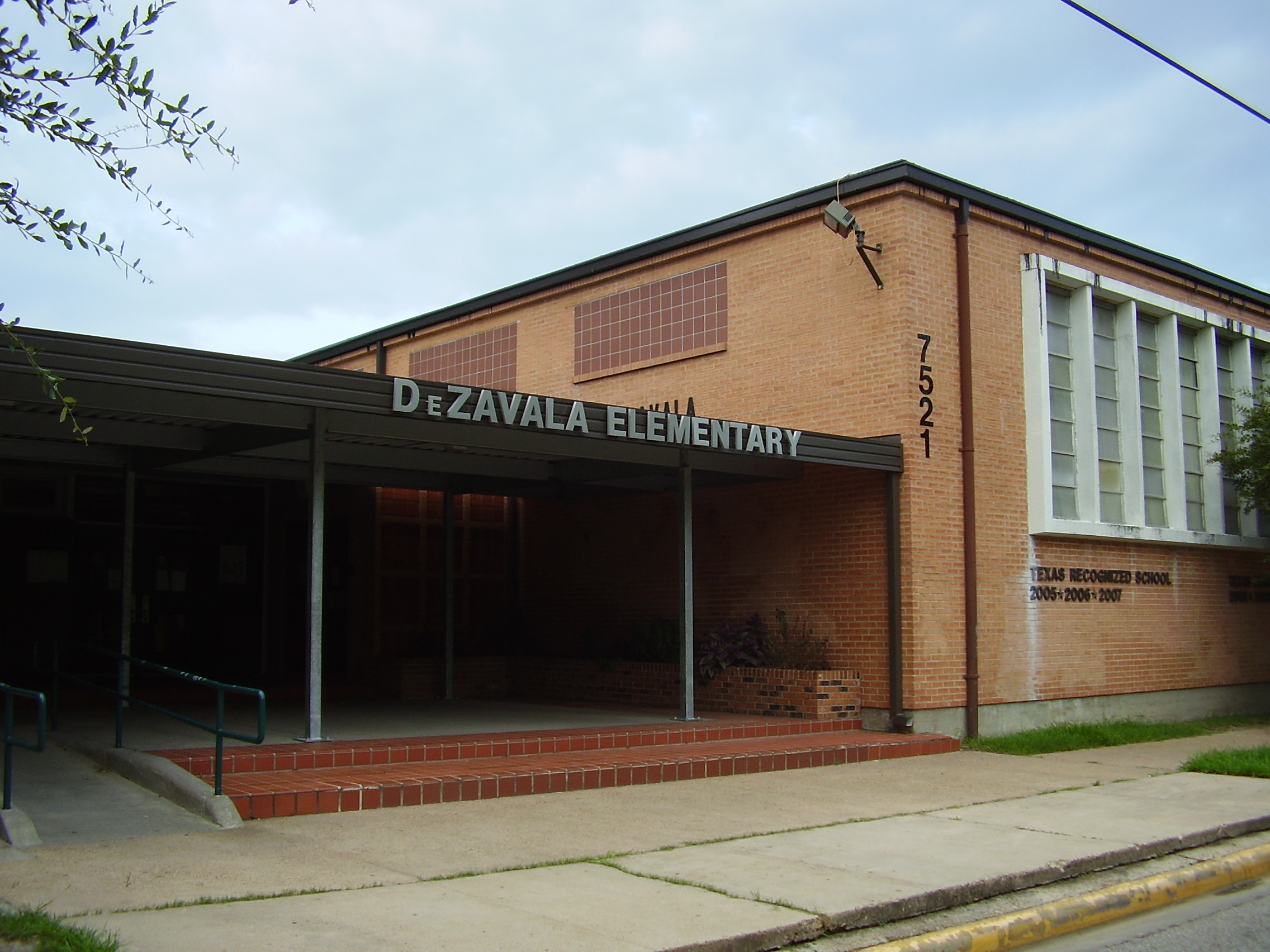
DeZavala Elementary School

Residents are zoned to Houston ISD schools.

Sections of Magnolia Park are zoned to the following elementary schools: Burnet, Briscoe, DeZavala, Franklin, Gallegos, Tijerina, and Edna M. Carrillo (outside of Magnolia Park).

All of Magnolia Park is zoned to Edison Middle School. Some of Magnolia Park is zoned to Milby High School. Some of Magnolia Park is zoned to Austin High School.

=== History of education ===
Originally the area was within the Harrisburg Independent School District. Park Junior High School opened on December 14, 1925.

A school named after Lorenzo De Zavala was first established in 1926, becoming the first ethnic Mexican majority school in Houston. In Houston Mexican students by law attended schools designated for Anglo Whites, but the school district opened De Zavala Elementary since area Anglo White parents felt concerned by the rise of the number of ethnic Mexican students in the area. In 1927 the school had 576 enrolled students. Circa the 1920s the administrators, who were Anglo Whites, enacted rules prohibiting students from speaking Spanish on the school property.

In 1930 a private school called Escuela Mexicana Hidalgo ("Hidalgo Mexican School") was established. Its goal was to preserve Mexican culture.

In February 1932 Park was renamed after Thomas Edison. Before 2000, Furr High School served much of Magnolia Park. Prior to 1997 residents zoned to Furr also had the option to attend Austin and Milby high schools; in 1997 the school district canceled the option.

== Transportation ==
METRO maintains the Magnolia Park Transit Center, which is on the METRORail Green Line.

Greyhound Bus Lines and Autobuses Americanos maintain services at a bus station next to the transit center. On December 1, 2023, Greyhound moved its remaining services from Midtown to the Magnolia Park bus stop. Houston City Council member Robert Gallegos, of District I, stated that Greyhound did not notify him of the timing in advance. Sylvester Turner, the Mayor of Houston stated that he did not know about the timing of the move until less than 24 hours before Greyhound's announcement. This station has four bays for buses, less than the previous station. There were area residents who stated that they did not want the type of criminal activity that had occurred around the Midtown station.

== Culture ==
Salon Juárez, built in 1928, is a 48 feet (15 m) by 80 feet (24 m) two-story building that served as the meeting house for the Sociedad Mutualista Benito Juárez, a mutual aid society formed in Magnolia Park in 1919. According to Stephen Fox, who specializes in the history of architecture, this is the city's first ethnic Mexican-oriented public building not made for religious purposes. Due to financial problems during the Great Depression the society no longer managed the building after 1932. After multiple changes in ownership, the physical plant began to suffer from maintenance issues in the 1980s and 1990s because the old roof was removed but a new roof was not put on it. Because the owner had not paid $20,000 in back taxes, the building was to be sold in a July 6, 2004 auction, but the taxes were paid before the auction occurred, so the owner kept the property. The Greater Houston Preservation Alliance classified it as an endangered building.

== Gallery ==
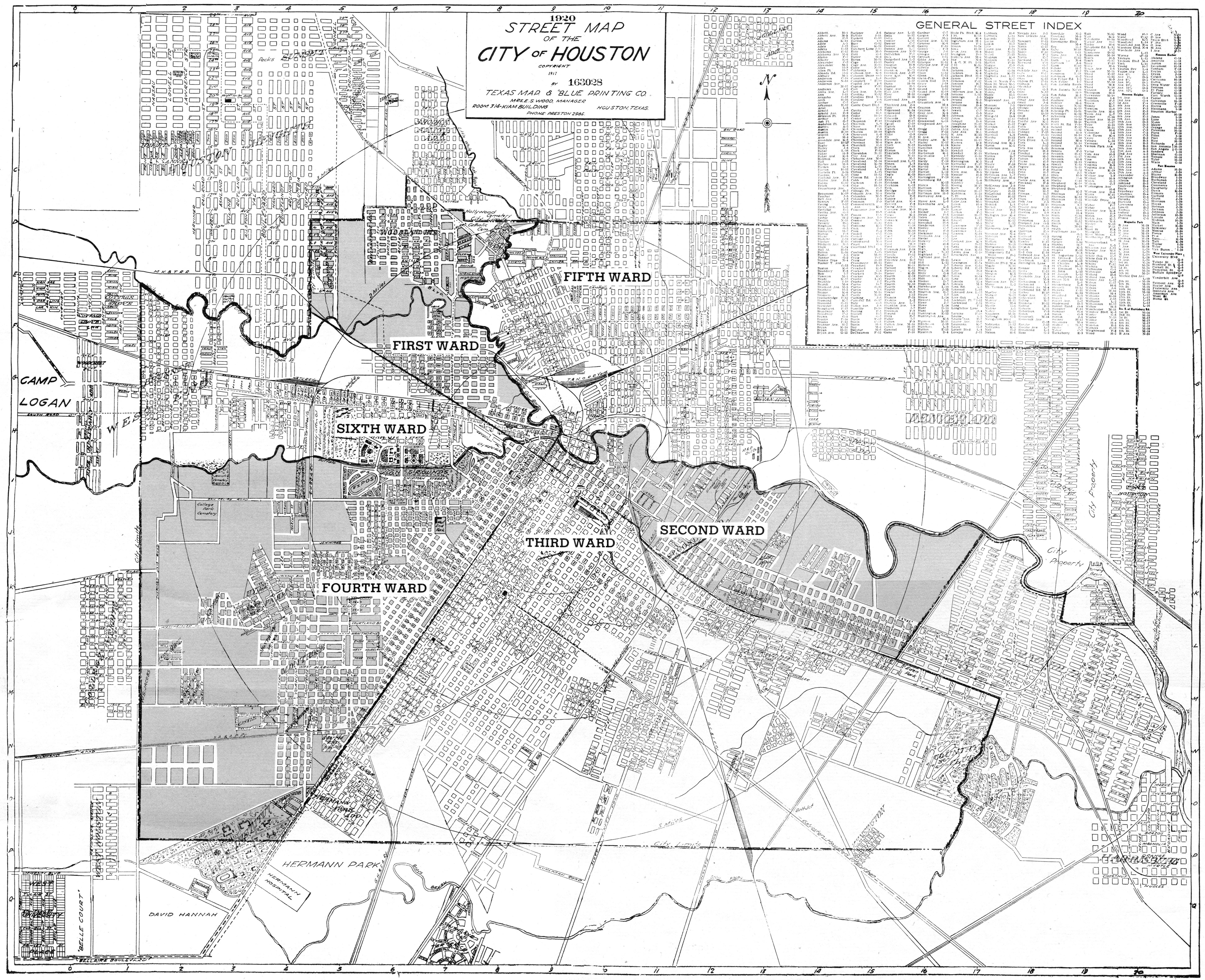
1920 six wards of Houston map, which also indicates Magnolia Park

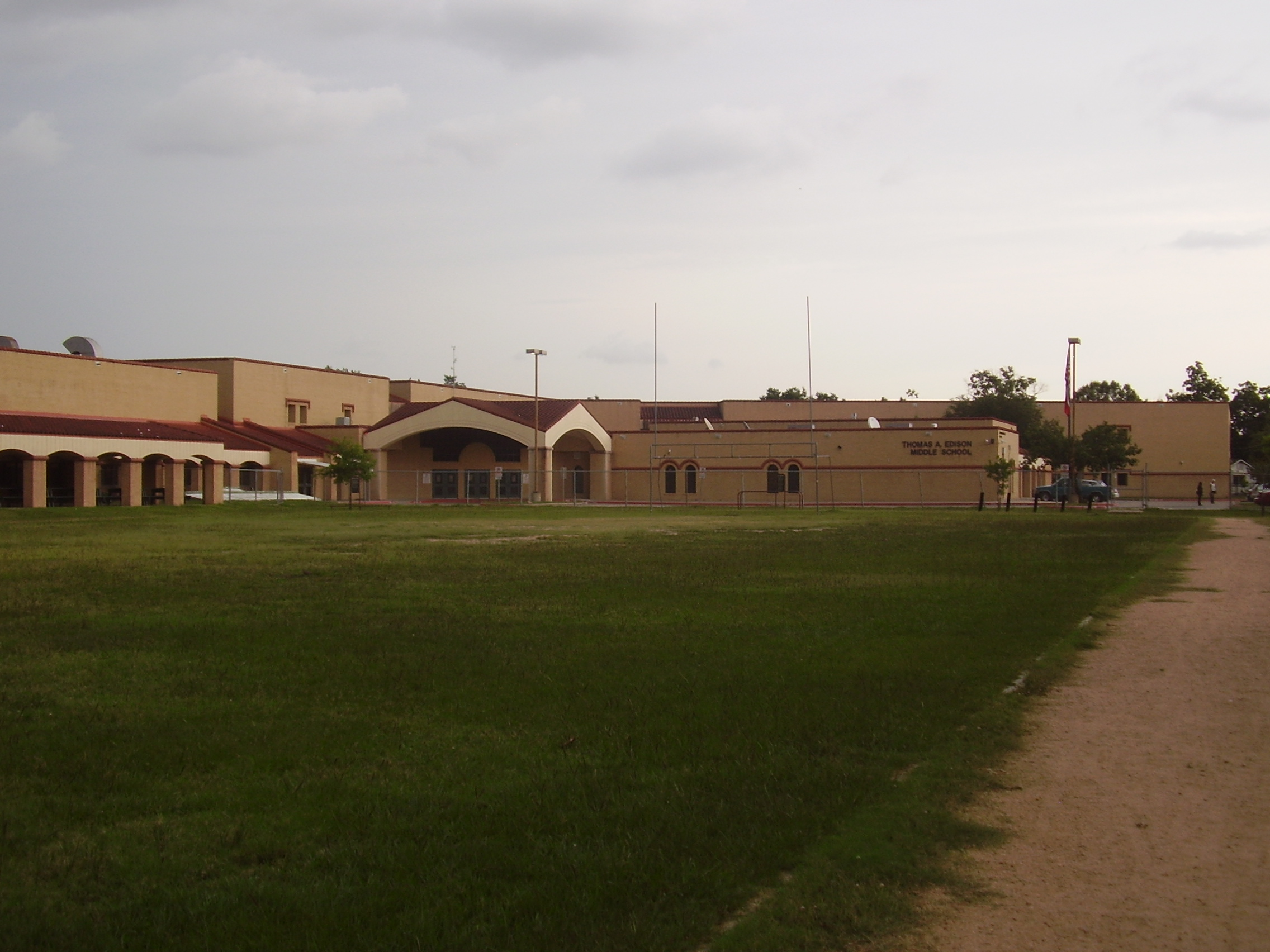
Thomas A. Edison Middle School

== Notable residents ==
- Texas Senator Mario Gallegos

== See also ==
- History of the Mexican-Americans in Houston
