= RioStar Corp. =

American restaurant holding corporation

RioStar Corporation was an American restaurant holding corporation controlled by Ninfa Laurenzo and her family. The company controlled the Ninfa's, Bambolino's, and Atchafalaya River Cafe brands. In March 1990, RioStar had 22 employees working in its corporate office. When RioStar was in existence, its corporate headquarters were in the East End of Houston, Texas.

RioStar was one of Houston's largest Hispanic-owned businesses. In 1994 it was one of 23 Hispanic-owned businesses in Greater Houston to be listed in Hispanic Business magazine's top 500 Hispanic-owned business in the United States, taking the rank of 65th largest.

The chairperson of RioStar was Ninfa Laurenzo. By 1993 she no longer operated the restaurants on a family basis. Roland Laurenzo, Ninfa's son, served as the company's president. Lee Kelleher served as the vice president and chief financial officer. Steve DiMeo served as the executive vice president.

== History ==
Roland Laurenzo, a graduate of the United States Naval Academy, was named president of RioStar Corporation when he was 24 years old, around the year 1976.

In 1989 the company had eleven Ninfa's locations, with one in Dallas, and 13 Bambolino's, all in Houston. In November 1989 RioStar had purchased four Atchafalaya River Cafe locations, two in Greater Houston and two in the Dallas-Fort Worth Metroplex, for $6 million. RioStar had acquired them from Richard Tanenbaum, a Houston restaurateur. Greyhound Financial Corp., a firm from Phoenix, Arizona, loaned $4 million to RioStar to allow it to acquire Atchafalaya River Cafe. Of the Atchafalayas locations in the DFW Metroplex, one was in Addison and one was in Arlington. In March 1990 RioStar stated that it planned to build two or three more Atchafalaya locations over the following 12 to 18 months, intending to open one in Clear Lake City by September 1990.

In 1989 and 1990, RioStar converted four Bambolino's locations into Ninfa's Cafe fajitarias. The first conversion occurred in November 1989, and the conversions of the other three occurred afterwards. Ten Bambolino's remained.

In March 1990 RioStar managed eleven Ninfa's locations, 10 Bambolino's locations, and four Atchafalaya River Cafe locations. Rio Star had $27.2 million in sales in 1990. In May 1991 the company, then the largest Hispanic-owned employer in Houston, had 1,300 employees, 11 Ninfa's, 10 Bambolino's, 4 Atchafalaya's, and nine other food operations. In 1993 the chain managed a total of 33 restaurants. During that year, RioStar finalized a deal to sell two Atachafalayas to Landry's Restaurants, receiving over $3 million. After selling those two and then opening two additional Atchafalayas locations, RioStar owned six Atchafalayas.

In 1996 the Laurenzo family, under RioStar, opened Bradley's Restaurant and Brewery, which was the only brewery in Clear Lake City. Bertrand Callahan created the menu, which included beer and light and hearty food items.

=== Planned Billy Blues sale ===
In 1993 RioStar planned to sell half of itself to Billy Blues Food Corp., a San Antonio, Texas company. This would have given Billy Blues an interest in Ninfa's and Atchafalaya River Cafe. In exchange, RioStar was to be given $10 million to open 15 new restaurants in 1993 and additional funds to open new restaurants in 1994. The deal was to be designed so that RioStar would remain as an independent company. The companies planned on using the funds from the joint venture to sell Ninfa's-branded products in grocery stores. They had produced a non-binding letter of intent. Ultimately the two companies cancelled their plans, because they were unable to agree upon the details of how the venture would be operated.

=== Bankruptcy protection and sale ===
On October 16, 1996, three subsidiaries of Sysco filed an involuntary bankruptcy petition against RioStar in an attempt to force the company to pay $2.8 million in debts. Sysco asked the U.S. bankruptcy courts to liquidate the chain, under the Chapter 7 bankruptcy code. On Wednesday October 30, 1996, In addition, the company Southern Produce also participated in the filing against RioStar; RioStar owed $51,682 to Southern Produce. Sysco severed its supplies to RioStar after doing the filing. Tom Laurenzo said that the restaurant chain expanded too aggressively, allowing for the debt situation to arise. Opening a new Ninfa's restaurant, which would have 180 to 200 seats, had a cost of $1 million apiece. In October 1996 Ninfa's, Inc., the holding company of Ninfa's restaurants, had liabilities of $14.6 million and assets of $9.1 million.

RioStar filed for Chapter 11 bankruptcy protection, making the case into a voluntary reorganization case so RioStar can determine how to pay its creditors. RioStar was scheduled to submit a reorganization plan on March 1, 1997. RioStar negotiated with vendors, and received a $500,000 line of credit from Conco Foods, a food distribution company in Louisiana. Morian Investments Inc. provided a $1.5 million line of credit so that RioStar could continue operations. The chairperson and chief executive officer of Strategic Capital Corp., Malcolm Lovett Jr., agreed to become RioStar's new financial advisor. Tom Laurenzo, a son of Ninfa Laurenzo who served as RioStar's vice president for marketing, said that business at the restaurant increased after the filing and that members of the business community moved to support the family.

As part of the bankruptcy reorganization, RioStar and the Ninfa's chain were sold to Serrano's Cafe and Cantina in 1998. The Laurenzo family was no longer involved in the business of the restaurants owned by RioStar.

== See also ==
- Landry's Restaurants
- Mexilink
- Pappas Restaurants
