= History of Mexican Americans in Houston =

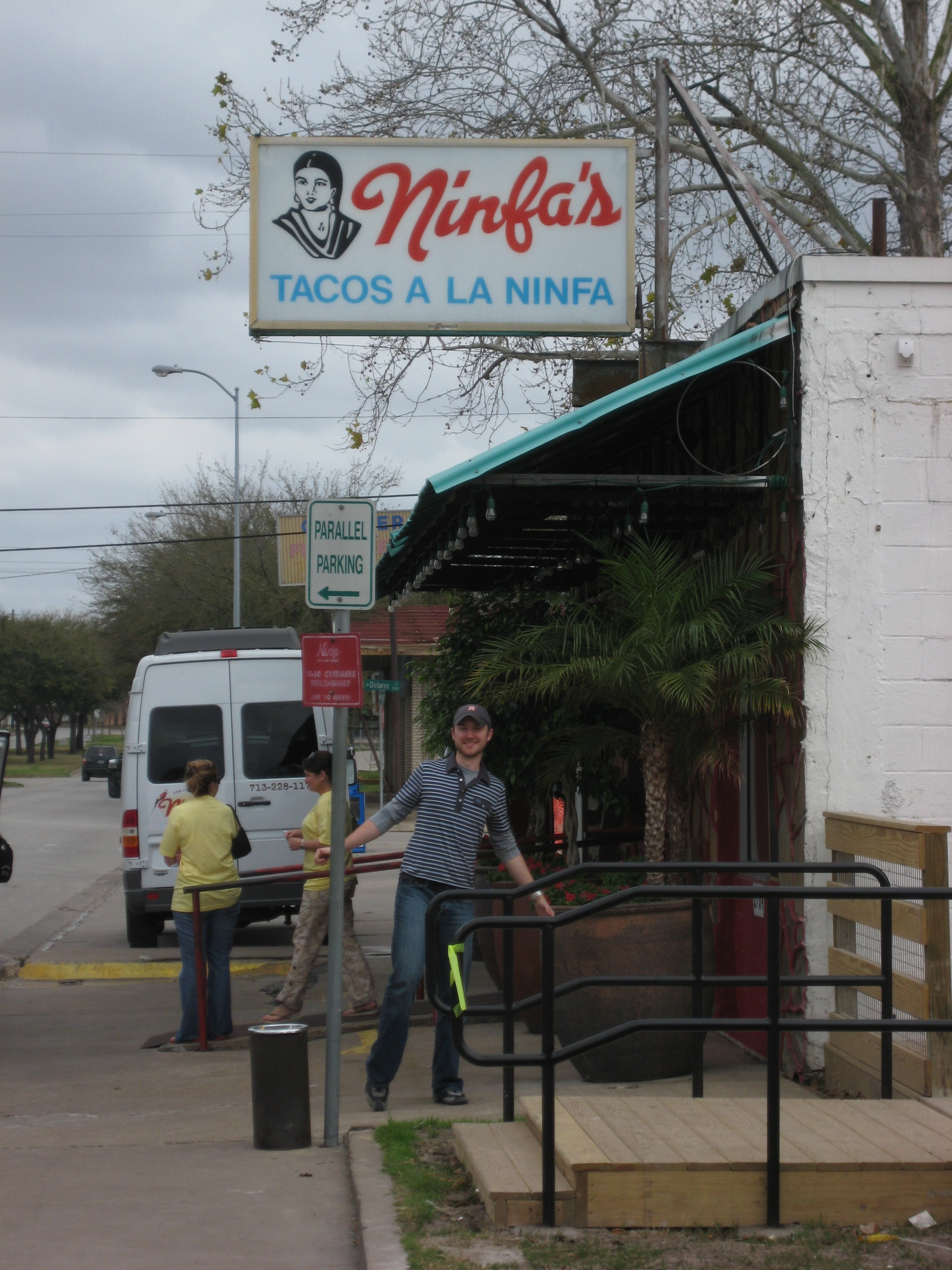
Original Ninfa's on Navigation Boulevard, established by Ninfa Laurenzo

The city of Houston has significant populations of Mexican Americans, Mexican immigrants, and Mexican citizen expatriates. Houston residents of Mexican origin make up the oldest Hispanic ethnic group in Houston, and Jessi Elana Aaron and José Esteban Hernández, authors of "Quantitative evidence for contact-induced accommodation: Shifts in /s/ reduction patterns in Salvadoran Spanish in Houston," referring to another large Latino group in Houston, stated that as of 2007 it was the most "well-established" Hispanophone ethnic group there. Houston is the third city for Mexican immigrants after Chicago and Los Angeles.

== History ==
=== Beginning and immigration in the early 20th century ===
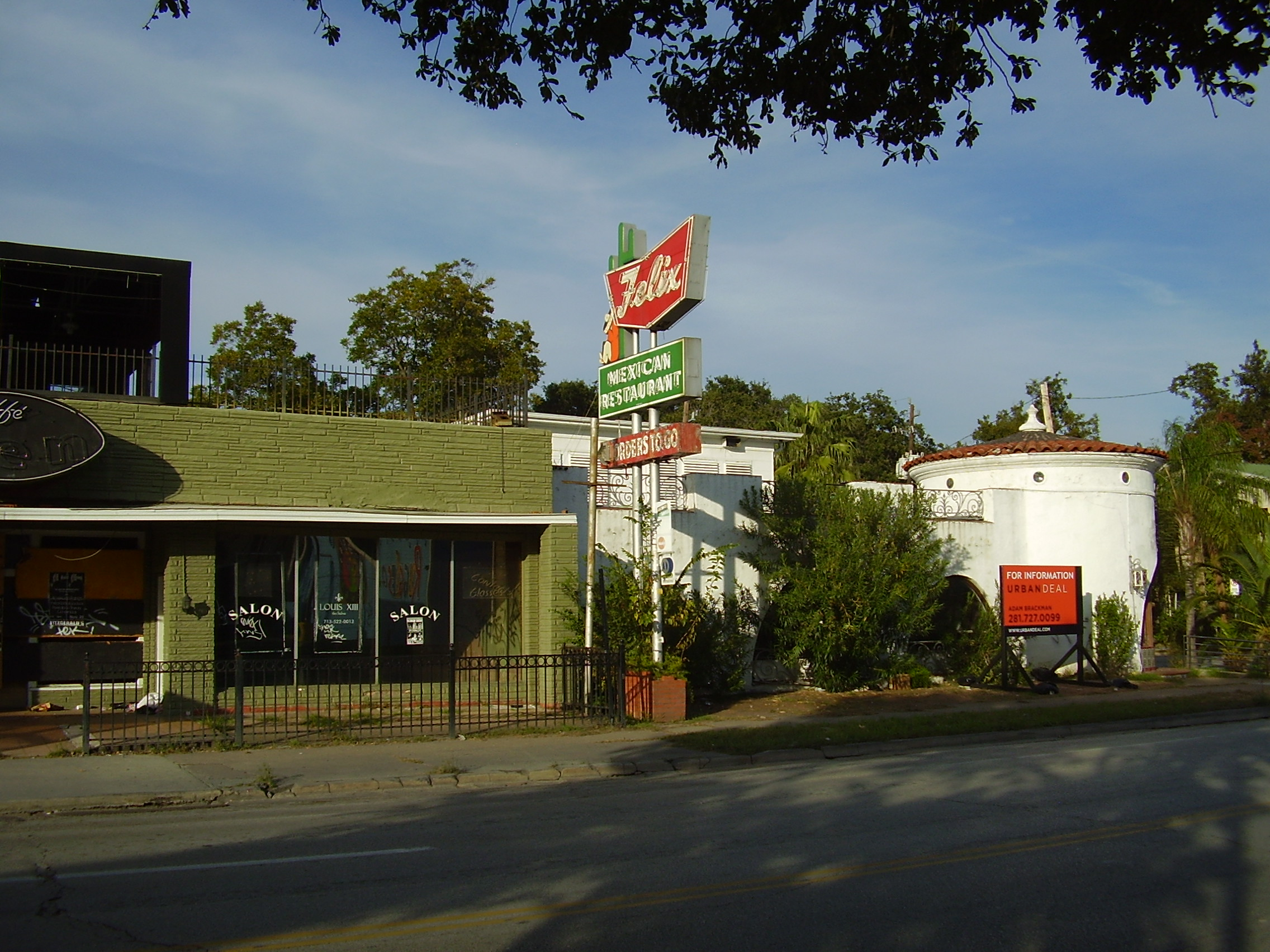
The former location of the final Felix Mexican Restaurant operation, established by Mexican-American Felix Tijerina

When Houston was first settled in 1836, some Mexican prisoners of war cleared and drained swampland so the city could be settled. Some parcels of land were given to 100 of the prisoners, who became servants. Throughout most of the 19th century most Mexican immigrants traveled to the Rio Grande Valley, El Paso, and San Antonio and did not go to East Texas cities like Houston. The Anglos (non-Hispanic, English speaking whites) in East Texas had a Deep South culture and preferred sharecroppers who were African American and Anglo. Robert R. Treviño, author of The Church in the Barrio: Mexican American Ethno-Catholicism in Houston, said that the Anglos "made it clear that Mexicans were not welcome." At various points between 1850 and 1880, six to eighteen Mexicans lived in Houston. Treviño said that "Mexicans were almost invisible in Houston during most of the nineteenth century." The authors of Mexican American Baseball in Houston and Southeast Texas, Richard A. Santillán, et al., stated that the lack of an established Mexican-American population differentiated Houston from other major Texas cities. Nestor Rodriguez, author of "Hispanic and Asian Immigration Waves in Houston," wrote that the 1880 U.S. Census showed a "handful" of Mexicans in Houston. That census counted fewer than ten persons of Mexican ancestry within the municipal boundaries.

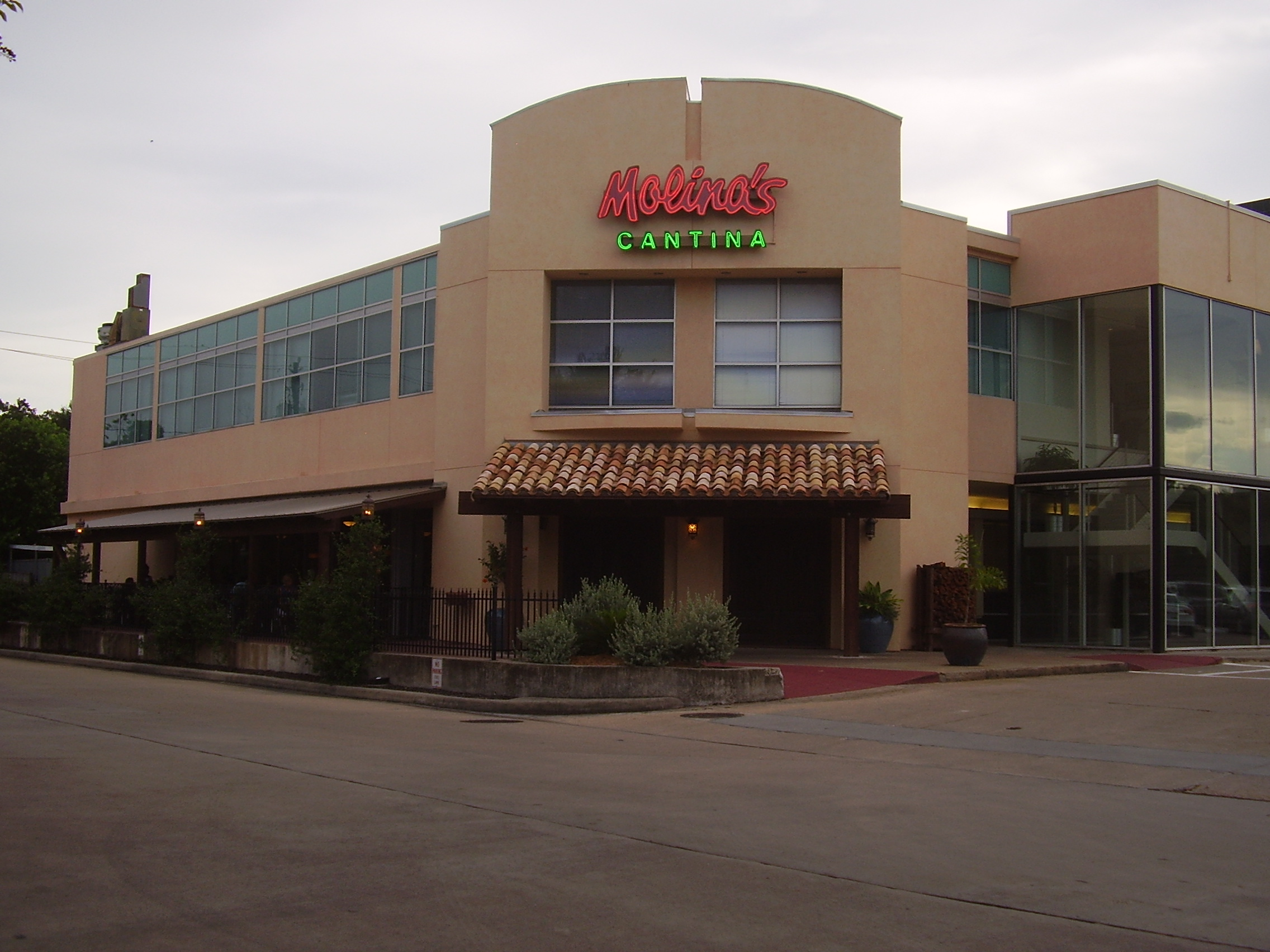
Molina's Cantina in Southside Place: Molina's was established by Raul Molina

Mexican migration into Houston increased with the expansion of the railroad system and the installation of Porfirio Díaz as the President of Mexico. Mexicans fleeing the hardships of the Díaz modernization program used the railroads to travel to Texas. In the late 1800s and early 1900s Mexican Americans and immigrants from Mexico began to stay in Houston permanently. Many worked in unskilled labor and as food vendors. 500 people of Mexican origin lived in Houston by the year 1900. This increased to 2,000 by 1910, Treviño said "[...]the haphazard trickle had become a steady influx[...]" In 1907 a junta patriótica (cultural committee) opened Mexican Independence Day festivities. In 1908 at least one Mexican American mutual aid society had formed. Houston's first educators of Mexican descent also arrived in the 1900s. In 1907, Houston hired its first Mexican male educator Juan Jose Mercado, who taught Spanish at Houston High School, a White school. By 1910 Houston had about 2,000 people of Mexican ancestry.

In the early 20th century the population further increased due to several factors. The 1910 Mexican Revolution drove many Mexicans to Houston. Employers recruited Mexican Americans and made them into enganchadores (labor agents) so they could recruit more workers; the enganchadores recruited Tejanos and immigrants. In addition many Mexican Americans in rural areas faced unemployment as commercial agriculture increased, and they traveled to Houston since Houston's economy was increasing. The labor shortage during World War I encouraged Mexicans to work in Houston. The immigration restrictions put in place in the 1920s did not affect Mexicans, so Mexicans continued to come to Houston. The increased work demands came from the building of the Houston Ship Channel and railroad construction in addition to the agricultural work in areas around Houston. Rodriguez wrote that "The labor-hungry Houston economy probably had as much influence" as the Mexican Revolution did." In 1920 Houston had 6,000 residents of Mexican origin. In 1930 about 15,000 residents were of Mexican origin. Originally Mexicans settled the Second Ward. Jesus Jesse Esparza of Houston History magazine said that the Second Ward "quickly became the unofficial hub of their cultural and social life." Magnolia Park began to attract Mexican immigrants in the 1920s. As time passed, Mexicans began moving to other neighborhoods, such as the First Ward, the Sixth Ward, the Northside (then a part of the Fifth Ward), and Magnolia Park. A group of about 100 Mexican families also settled the Houston Heights.

By 1930 Houston had about 15,000 Mexicans. This was almost twice as many as the 8,339 first and second generation Eastern and Southern European immigrants in Houston. Treviño said that the Mexican American community "took root in a society that had been historically black and white but one that increasingly became tri-ethnic— black, white, and brown[...]" He added that "In a city that considered them nonwhite, Mexicans stood out even though their numbers were smaller than those in such places as San Antonio and Los Angeles."

José F. Aranda, Jr. of Rice University, who reviewed the book The Church in the Barrio, wrote that historically Mexican immigrants "found the racial landscape particularly unwelcoming" because Houston was not in proximity to the, at the time, larger Mexican American communities in Texas.

Scholars of Mexican-American studies say that, in regards to Houston's Mexican-American population, the "immigrant era" ended in the 1930s. As the Great Depression affected Houston, City of Houston officials accused Mexican Americans of being economically harmful and launched raids into their communities. Local and federal interests, which included American-born ethnic Mexicans, had feared that the Mexican population would try to escape the economic problems by attempting to obtain public relief, so they pressured Mexican immigrants to leave Houston. Many Mexican-Americans did not receive federal benefits meant to alleviate the effects of the Great Depression. At that time the immigration wave ended and about 2,000 Mexicans left Houston during the Depression era. Several Mexican-American organizations, such as the Our Lady of Guadalupe Church and the Sociedad Mutualista Obrera Mexicana, provided relief services to the community during that era.

=== Immigration in the late 20th century and 21st century ===
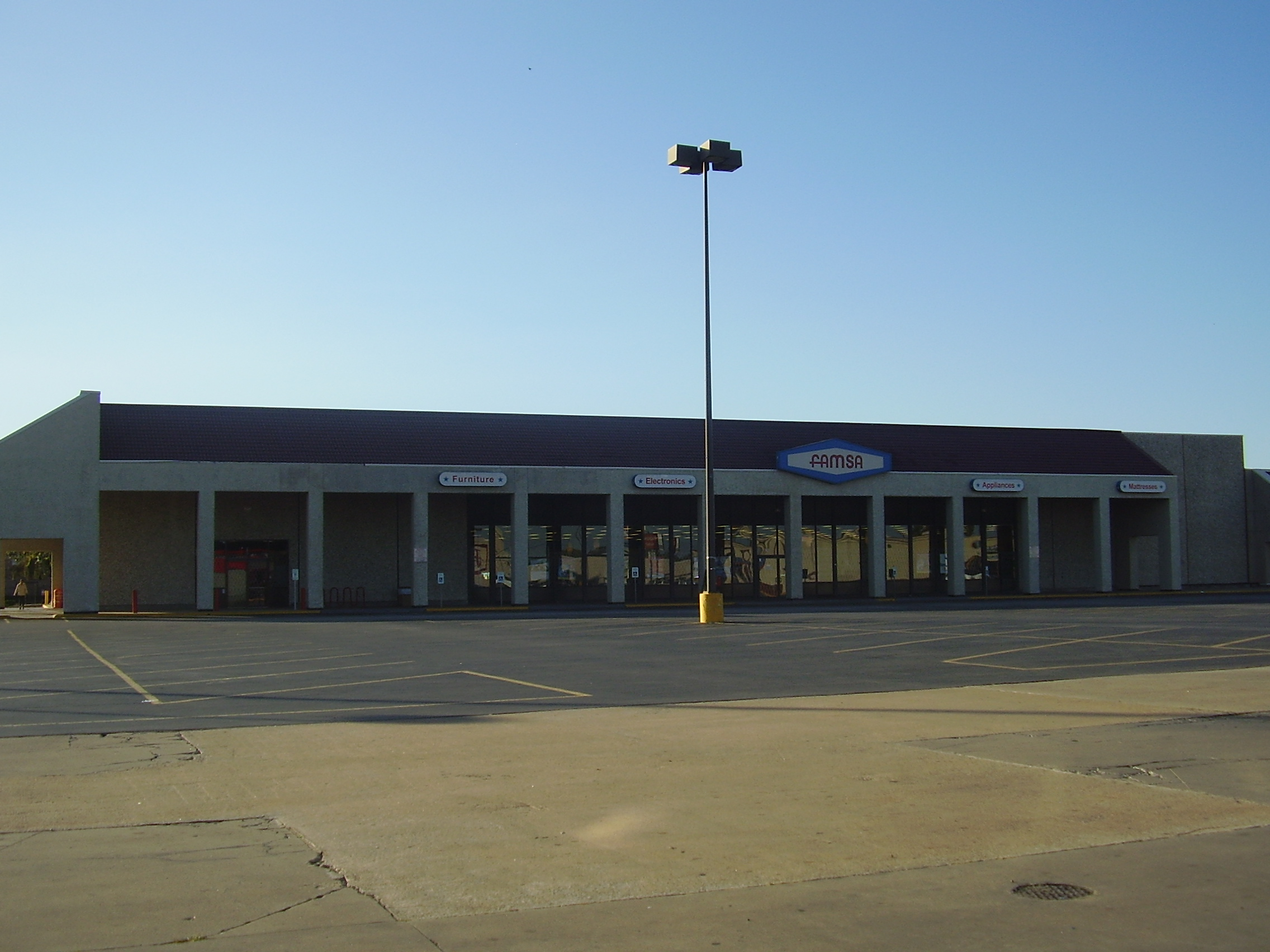
A Famsa location in the Gulfton area in Houston

In the late 1970s and early 1980s tens of thousands of Mexicans arrived in Houston due to increased economic opportunities from an increase in the oil business. In the 1970s 63,000 Mexicans arrived in the Houston metropolitan area. In the more recent immigrant wave, the Mexicans tended to work in informal labor markets. Most Mexicans in the immigrant wave in the 1970s and 1980s originated from Coahuila, Nuevo León, and Tamaulipas, states along the U.S.-Mexico border. In 1980, according to the U.S. census, there were 93,718 Mexicans who were born outside of the United States. 68% of the Mexicans in that figure had immigrated since 1970. In the early 1980s there was an estimation of 80,000 undocumented immigrants from Mexico, along with 300,000 native Hispanics.

Mexican immigration in Houston fluctuated due to the 1980s oil bust. The oil bust resulted in hardships and job losses for area Mexicans. Because many Mexicans sought to find work in other U.S. cities, Houston-area transportation businesses started by Mexicans sought to flourish. In 1986 a federal law was passed that prohibited hiring of undocumented immigrants, reducing possibilities of work for Mexican undocumented immigrants. Despite this fluctuation, in the 1980s 89,000 Mexicans arrived in Harris County. After 1987, when the oil bust ended, the wages stagnated and the number of jobs had a slow growth. The Immigration Reform and Control Act (IRCA) offered amnesty and legalization for undocumented immigrants who arrived before 1982. The same law fined employers hiring undocumented immigrants.

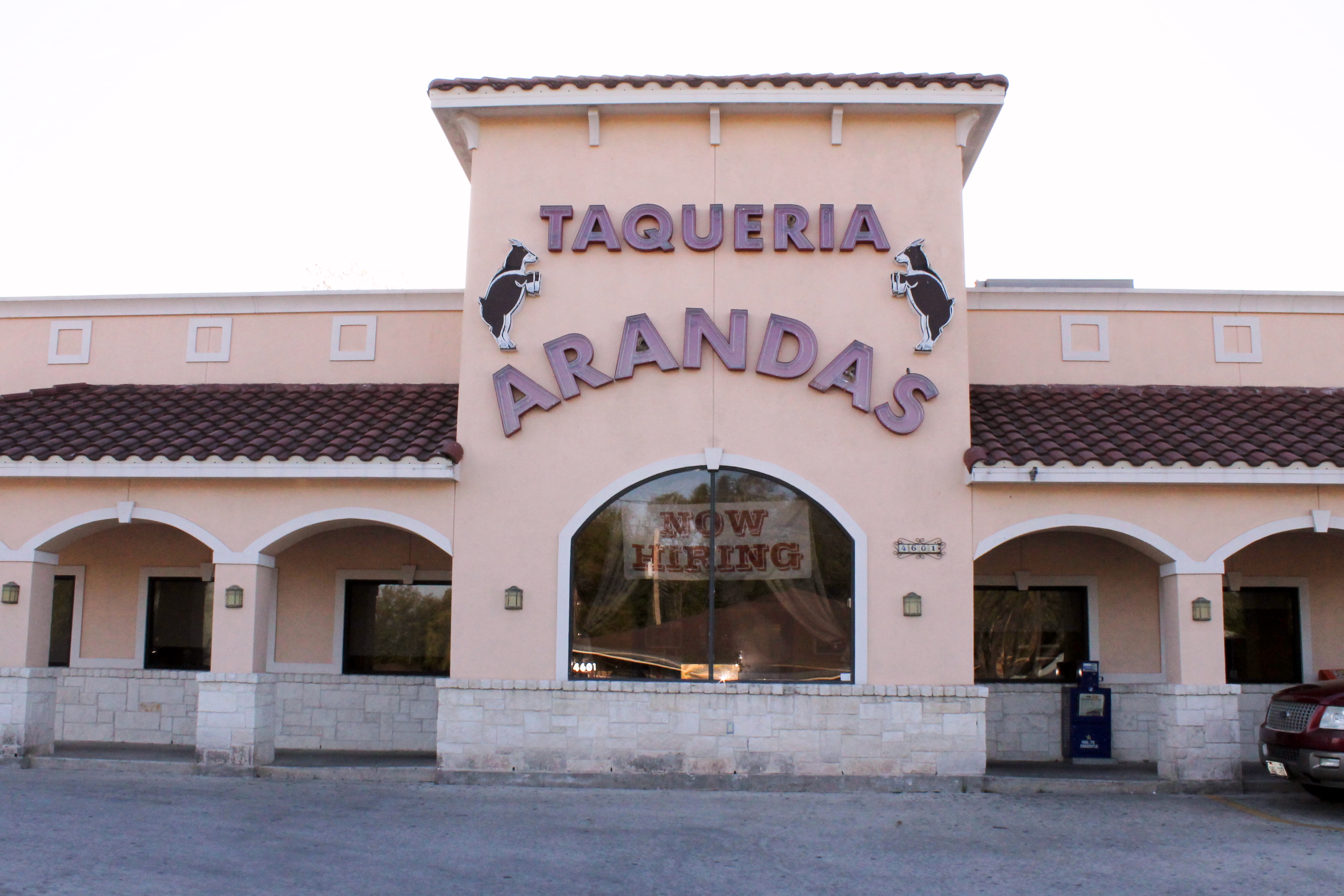
The original location of Taqueria Arandas, started by Jose Camarena

In 1990, there were 132,596 Mexican immigrants in Houston, making up 69% of the 192,220 foreign-born Hispanic residents of Houston. That year, 46% of all immigrants to Houston were Mexican. In 1990, in Harris County, and the median household income of ethnic Mexicans was $22,447 and 6% of its ethnic Mexican population had a bachelor's degree or higher education. Nestor Rodriguez wrote that the percentage of those with a bachelor's degree or higher illustrates "a major educational disadvantage" and "partly explained the low median household income".

From 1990 to 1997 the number of Mexican immigrants in Houston increased by over 110,000. In the 1990s the burgeoning economy, a decline in the Mexican economy, and thousands of legalized immigrants filing family reunification petitions encouraged additional Mexican immigration. During the decade an increase in anti-immigrant sentiments, the anti-hiring undocumented immigrant laws and a new law passed in 1996 that restricted immigration had, in the words of Nestor Rodriguez, "lessened the explosive energy that characterized Mexican undocumented immigration in the 1970s and 1980s."

In the 1989 book Ethnicity in the Sunbelt: A History of Mexican Americans in Houston, author Arnoldo De León described the relationship between Houston Mexican-Americans and newly arrived immigrants from Mexico. De León said that the traditional residents disliked how they believed that the new immigrants were giving the Mexican-American community in Houston a bad reputation but added that, at the same time, the new immigrants kept the city's Mexican-American community in touch with the home country.

As of 2007 most of the Hispanic and Latino political power in Houston consists of Mexican Americans.

By 2007 many wealthy Mexican citizens escaping crime and kidnapping moved their families to Houston. Houston's air transport links to Mexico and the lower prices of luxury houses compared to other American cities made it attractive to wealthy Mexicans. In 2010 many residents of Monterrey, Mexico moved to Houston to escape drug cartel violence.

By June 2012 the Yo Soy 132 movement in Mexico spread to Houston, using the hashtag #YoSoy132-Houston.

== Media history ==
Some of the earliest Mexican-American newspapers in Houston included El Anunciador, La Gaceta Mexicana, El Tecolote, and La Tribuna.

== Religious history ==
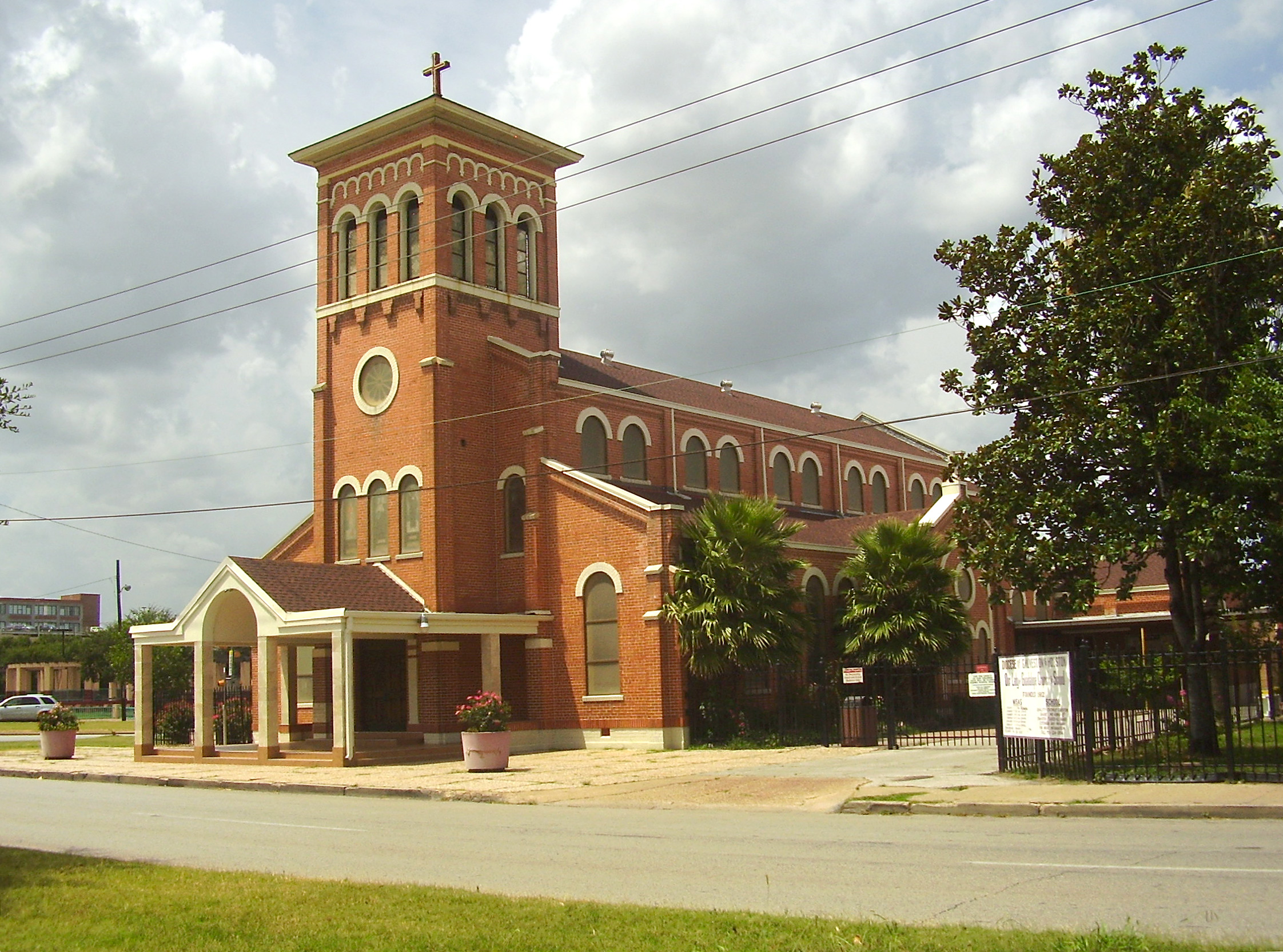
Our Lady of Guadalupe Catholic Church

Historically many Mexican immigrants to Houston came from areas where folk religion was common, and this conflicted with existing American Catholicism.

In 1910 there were no Mexican Catholic churches in Houston. Some Mexicans were excluded from attending Anglo Catholic churches. Mexicans who did attend found themselves discriminated against. In 1911 the Roman Catholic Diocese of Galveston brought the Oblates of Mary Immaculate, a series of priests intended to minister to the Mexican population of Houston. In 1912 Our Lady of Guadalupe Catholic Church, the first Mexican Catholic church, opened. Due to an increase in demand in Catholic services, oblates established missions in various Mexican-American neighborhoods. The Roman Catholic church established Our Lady of Guadalupe so that White people accustomed to segregation of races did not find offense with the presence of Mexican people in their churches. The second Mexican Catholic church, Immaculate Heart of Mary Catholic Church, opened in the 1920s. It originated as an oblate mission in Magnolia Park, on the second floor of the residence of Emilio Aranda. A permanent two-story building, funded by the community, opened in 1926.

As time passed, additional churches established by Mexicans opened, and as some neighborhoods became majority Mexican the churches became Mexican churches.

In 1972 the Catholic church leaders and lay Hispanics in Houston participated in the Encuentro Hispano de Pastoral ("Pastoral Congress for the Spanish-speaking"). Robert R. Treviño, author of The Church in the Barrio: Mexican American Ethno-Catholicism in Houston, said that the event "stands as a watershed in the religious history of Mexican American Catholics in Houston". Treviño also said that Mexican-American Catholics "competed for cultural space not only with the Anglo majority, which included various groups of white Catholics, but also with a large black population and a Mexican protestant presence as well."

== Geography ==
As of 2007 many wealthy Mexicans living in Houston prefer to live in gated communities with private security patrols as the environment is similar to that of wealthy neighborhoods in Mexico. Royal Oaks Country Club is among those communities.

As of 2017 about 10% of the residents of The Woodlands were of Mexican origins; they numbered at over 10,000. In 2000 wealthy Mexicans began buying houses in The Woodlands for vacation purposes. Large numbers settled in The Woodlands from 2006 to 2014 as the Mexican drug war occurred. In 2017 many wealthy Mexicans in Texas were moving back to Mexico and fewer were moving to The Woodlands. The Rice University Baker Institute director, Tony Payán, stated that uncertainty regarding the Trump Administration's attitudes towards immigration and the decline in value of the Mexican peso were factors.

Pasadena and Galena Park are suburbs with a large Mexican population in Houston.

== Organizations ==
As of 2001 Association for the Advancement of Mexican Americans (AAMA) is the largest advocacy group for Hispanics in the Houston area. It was established in 1971, also making it the oldest such group, on the premises of the Ninfa's restaurant.

The Sociedad Mutualista Benito Juárez, a mutual aid society was established in Magnolia Park in May 1919. Salon Juárez, built in 1928, is a 48 feet (15 m) by 80 feet (24 m) two story building that served as its meeting house. According to Stephen Fox, who specializes in the history of architecture, this is the city's first ethnic Mexican-oriented public building not made for religious purposes. Due to financial problems during the Great Depression the society no longer managed the building after 1932. After multiple changes in ownership, the physical plant began to suffer from maintenance issues in the 1980s and 1990s because the old roof was removed but a new roof was not put on it. Because the owner had not paid $20,000 in back taxes, the building was to be sold in a July 6, 2004 auction, but the taxes were paid before the auction occurred, so the owner kept the property. The Greater Houston Preservation Alliance classified it as an endangered building.

== Education ==
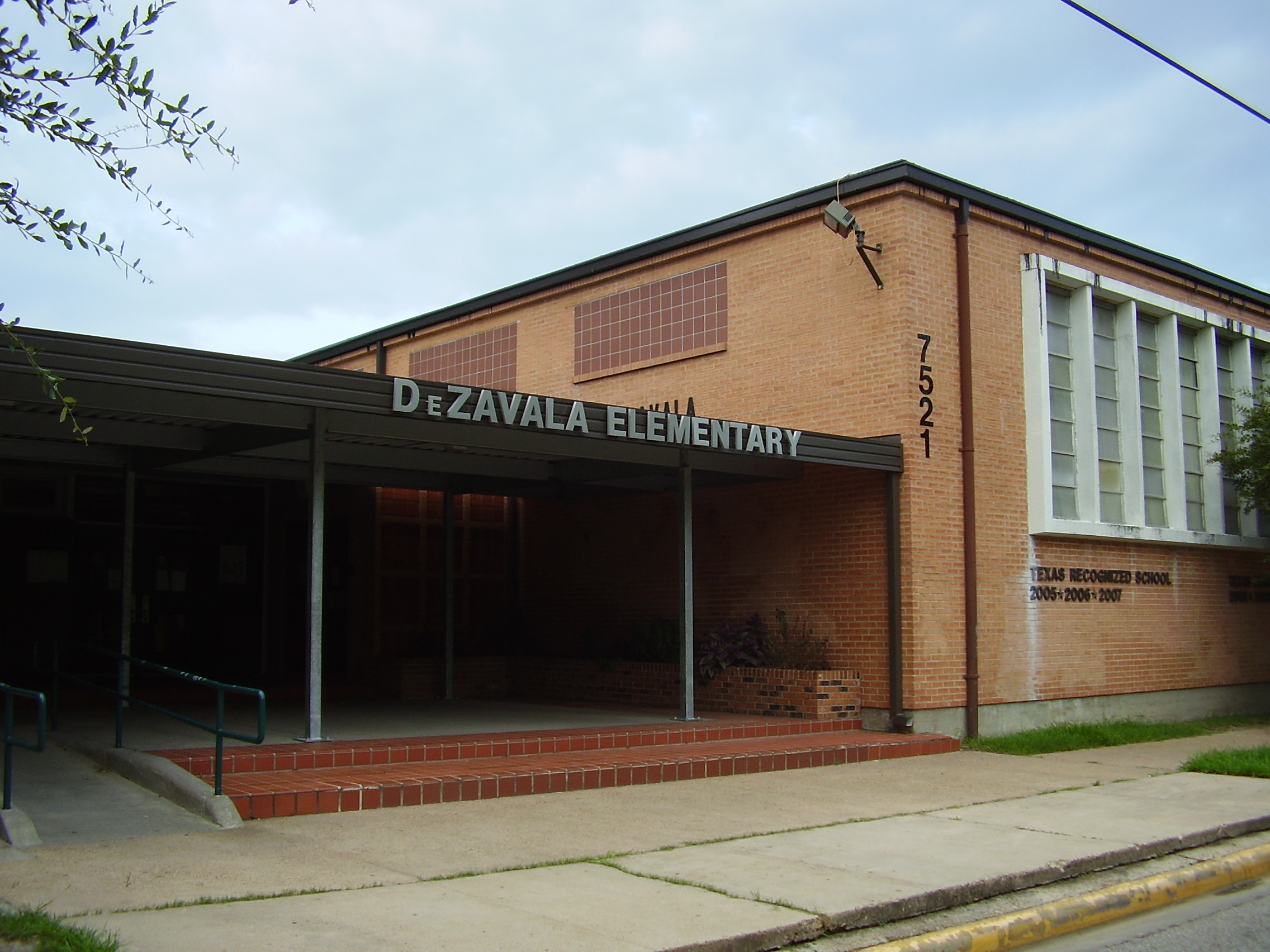
De Zavala Elementary School (modern building pictured) was the first majority ethnic Mexican school in Houston

In the 20th century, when schools were legally segregated by race (the Jim Crow era), Mexican-Americans attended schools legally designated for white students. Until 1970 the Houston Independent School District (HISD) counted its Hispanic and Latino students as "white."

Beginning in the 20th century were some ethnic Mexican-majority elementary schools in Houston; the first school with a majority ethnic Mexican student body was Lorenzo de Zavala Elementary School in Magnolia Park. Mexican students attended schools classified as being for white students; school district administrators established De Zavala elementary to alleviate fears from Anglo White parents who noticed an increase in Mexican students in the area White schools. At some schools, such as Rusk Elementary School near the Second Ward, school administrators established de facto segregation by assigning Mexican students to separate classes. At the time no ethnic Mexican-majority high schools yet existed.

An increase in the Hispanic presence of public schools in Houston began in 1937. After the 1960s many of the secondary schools began to change from being mostly Anglo to mostly Hispanic.

AAMA operates George I. Sanchez Charter Schools.

== Diplomatic missions ==
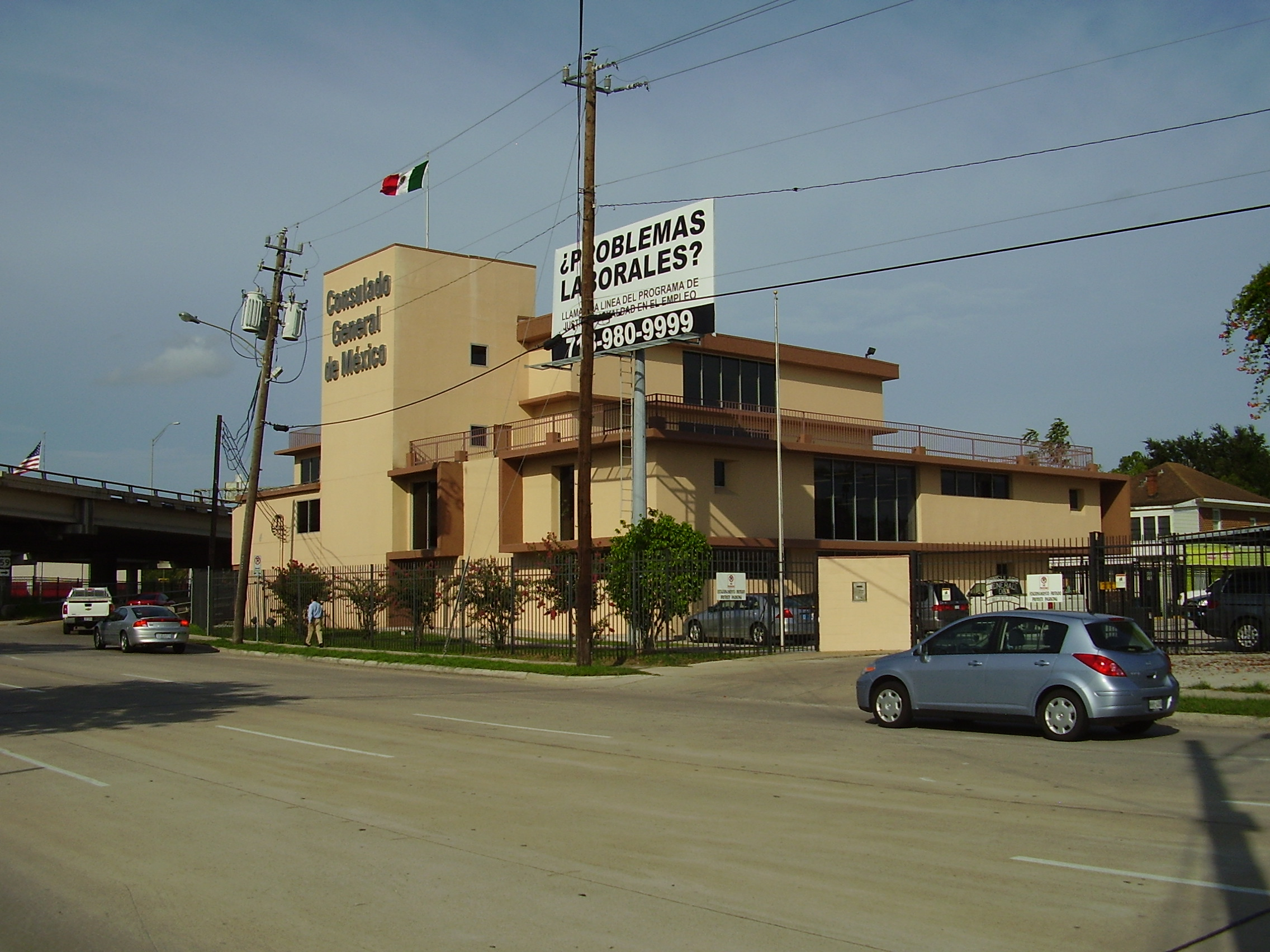
The former Consulate-General of Mexico

From 2001 to 2021 the Consulate-General of Mexico was formerly located in the Greater Southeast Management District, on 1.7 acres (0.69 ha) of area adjacent to Interstate 69/U.S. Highway 59. In 2019 the Mexican government agreed to give the state government of Texas the consulate's land, in exchange for the state giving the Mexican government 3 acres (1.2 ha) of land in Westchase, Houston that was previously state property. The consulate opened its new location in June 2021. The move is rebuilding so the state government can reconstruct freeways in the Southeast Houston area.

== Transportation ==
As of 2007 there were at least 20 flights per day from Houston to Mexico City and about 20 daily flights to other Mexican cities, making up about 40 flights total.

== Politics ==
In 1969 Lauro Cruz was elected in the Texas House of Representatives in District 23, making him the first Mexican American in what author Mikaela Garza Selley described in Houston History Magazine as a "major political position".

== Cuisine ==
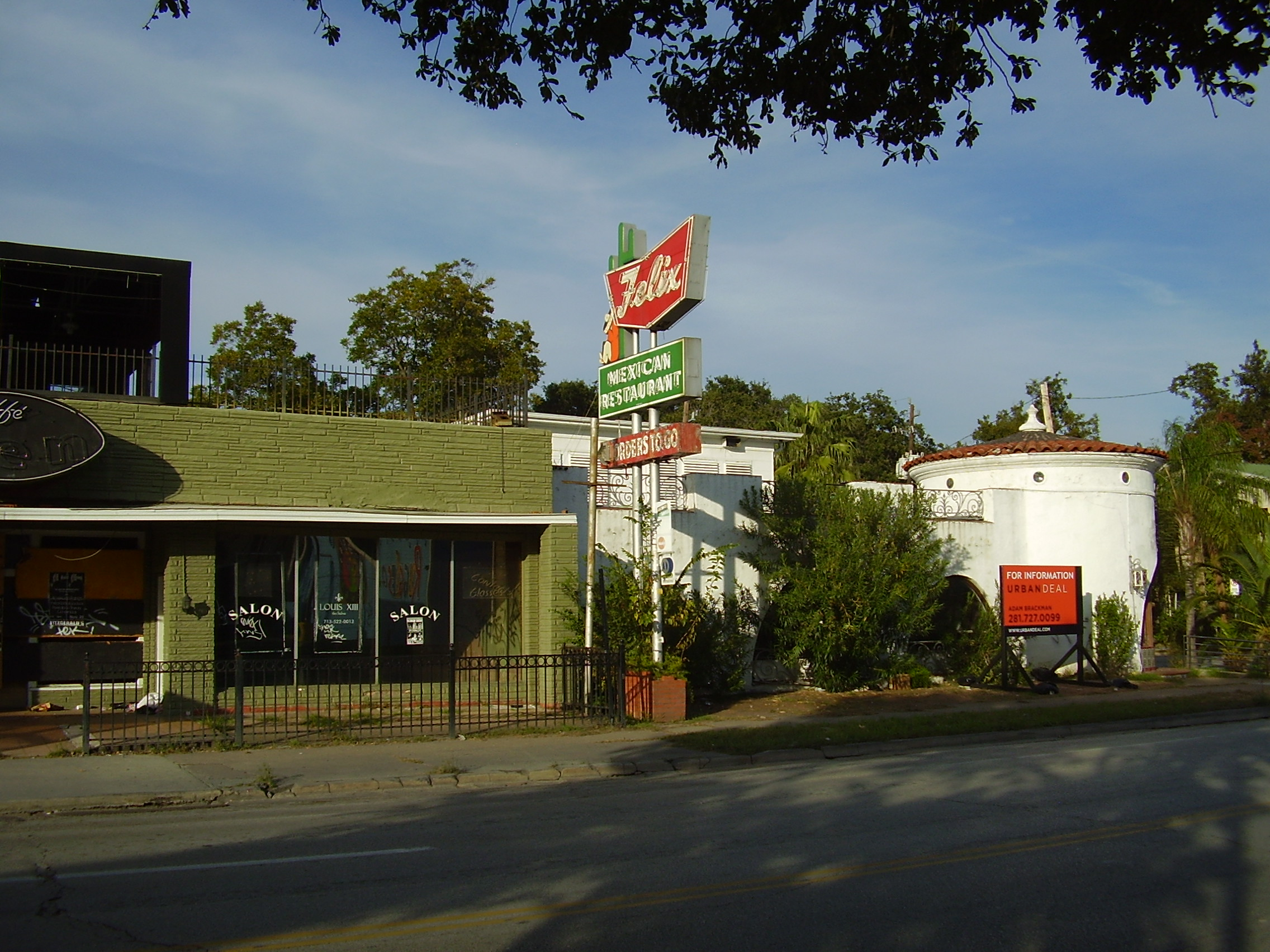
The former location of the final Felix Mexican Restaurant operation

Felix Tijerina established the restaurant Felix's while also becoming involved in Mexican-American activism. Selley stated that his restaurant "became "the most recognized Mexican American business success story in Houston."" Felix's and Molina's Cantina served Tex-Mex catering to Anglo customers.

Selley described four restaurants as "long-standing Houston institutions whose political involvement remains as well-known as their house special-ties." These four are Andy's Café, Doneraki Authentic Mexican Restaurant, Merida Mexican Café, and Villa Arcos Taquitos. Jesse and Sadie Morales named their restaurant Andy's Café after their son; it was established in 1977. According to the Morales's grandson, Anthony Espinoza, the restaurant is the Tex-Mex style as both founders had been born and raised in Texas and were accustomed to American cuisine. Doneraki, established by Cesar Rodríguez, had tacos al carbon inventor Don Erakio as its namesake. Rafael and Olga Acosta established Merida Mexican Café in 1972. Villa Arcos was established in 1977 by Velia Arcos Rodríguez Durán.

Others:

- Ninfa's
- Taqueria Arandas

== Recreation ==
By the 1940s Mexican-American sports clubs, including baseball clubs, had been established. Mexican-American businesses helped sponsor the baseball clubs; Mexican-Americans playing baseball in Houston began by the 1920s. The Latin American State Tournament is a Mexican-American tournament for men's softball. Félix Fraga created it by the 1940s. The team at one time only included Hispanics and Latinos, and the managers asked for birth certificates so potential players could prove they were of Hispanic or Latino origins. Some white persons not of Hispanic origins tried registering under falsified Spanish family names to become players.

== In media ==
The 2011 novel What Can't Wait by Ashley Hope Pérez is about a Mexican-American teenage girl torn between the demands of her family and her ambitions for the future.

== Notable Mexican-Americans ==
- Mario Gallegos, Jr. - Democratic politician in the U.S. state of Texas.
- Marcario García - Resident of Sugar Land and member of the military
- Refugio Gómez
- Jim Goode - Restaurateur of partial Mexican descent
- Vanessa Guillén - Soldier and murder victim
- Ninfa Laurenzo (Maria Ninfa Rodriguez Laurenzo) - Founder of Ninfa's
- Lydia Mendoza
- Rick Noriega
- Ben Reyes
- South Park Mexican (Carlos Coy) - rapper, founder of Dope House Records, felon
- Chingo Bling (Pedro Herrera III) - rapper and producer
- Felix Tijerina - Restaurateur, activist, and philanthropist
- Roman Martinez basketball player in Mexico for Soles de Mexicali and the Mexico national team
- Carol Alvarado - representative for Texas' 145th state house district
- Gwendolyn Zepeda - author (father was Mexican American)
- Rose Mary Salum - Award Winning Author, Publisher, Professor and Producer

== See also ==
- Demographics of Houston
- History of the Central Americans in Houston
- History of the Mexican-Americans in Texas
- Hispanic and Latino Americans in Texas
- Tex-Mex cuisine in Houston
- Magnolia Park, Houston
- Mexilink
- Ninfa's
- Taqueria Arandas
- History of Mexican Americans in Dallas–Fort Worth
