= Tejano Proud =

Tejano Proud: Tex-Mex Music in the Twentieth Century is a 2002 non-fiction book by Guadalupe San Miguel, published by the Texas A&M University Press.

John Koegel of California State University, Fullerton described the work as "a sympathetic and balanced historical overview" of the subject. Koegel argued that the work "is firmly anchored in Chicano and Southwest studies".

== Background ==
According to Koegel, San Miguel is a "long-time fan" of the genre. San Miguel had been engaged in dance.

The author consulted works from the popular press and the scholarly community as sources.

== Content ==
The first chapter outlines the definition of Tejano music.

Koegel argued that the "core" of the work is in Chapters three through six.

== Reception ==
Yolanda G. Romero of North Lake College praised the book for being done "in a scholarly and well-organized fashion." According to Romero, the work is not "exhaustive".

Omar Valerio-Jiménez of California State University, Long Beach wrote that the work would be "useful" to people who are learning about the genre.

== See also ==
Other books by San Miguel:

- Brown, Not White
- "Let All of Them Take Heed"
