= Guadalupe San Miguel =

American professor and author (born 1950)

- Born: Guadalupe San Miguel, Jr. 19 January 1950 (age 76) Houston, Texas, U.S.
- Notable works: "Let All of Them Take Heed" (1987); Tejano Proud (2002); Brown, Not White (2005)

Guadalupe San Miguel Jr. (born 19 January 1950) is an American professor and non fiction writer. His works includes; "Let All of Them Take Heed" (1987), Tejano Proud (2002), Brown, Not White (2005).

Guadalupe is a professor of history at the University of Houston and has written articles and books on history of Mexican American, Chicana, and Latina including political reviews.

== Life and career ==
=== Early life and beginning ===
Guadalupe received his M.A. and Ph.D. from Stanford University. His research interests span topics such as ethnicity, religion, and politics in the schooling of Mexican children, Latino activism in school reform, and the role of music in Mexican American culture. Notably, his book Brown, Not White: School Integration and the Chicano Movement in Houston shared light on a little-known struggle for educational reform in Texas during the early 1970s.

=== Teaching ===
San Miguel became a professor of history at the University of Houston and he had taught Chicano studies, covering topics such as Tejano Music, Latino politics, Chicano history, and the Mexican American Civil Rights Movement in the 20th century.

=== Leadership and awards ===
Dr. San Miguel has served as president of the National Association of Chicana and Chicano Studies. He received the Lifetime Achievement Award from the same association. His work has been recognized with awards including; the Public Forum Distinguished Lecture Award and an Outstanding Book Award for his impactful research.

== Writings ==
Novels

- San Miguel, Guadalupe (1987). "Let All of Them Take Heed". Texas: University of Texas Press.
- —— (2002). Tejano Proud. Texas: Texas A&M University Press.
- —— (2005). Brown, Not White. Texas: Texas A&M University Press.
