= Tejano Music Award for Album of the Year – Orchestra =

Former American music award

Tejano Music Award for Album of the Year – Group/Orchestra
- Awarded for: Group/Orchestra Album of the Year
- Country: United States
- Presented by: Local television and radio stations
- First award: 1981
- Currently held by: Los Hermanos Farias (2013)

Highlights
- Most awards: Mazz (8)
- Website: Tejano Music Awards

The Tejano Music Award for Album of the Year – Group (formerly the Tejano Music Award for Album of the Year – Orchestra from 1981 to 1997) was an honor presented to albums by Tejano music groups/bands.

== Recipients ==
Year	Performing artist(s)	Work	Nominees	Ref.
1981	Little Joe y La Familia	Live for Schlitz		
1982	Little Joe y La Familia	Prieta Linda		
1983	La Mafia	Honey		
1984	La Mafia	Electrifying	Mazz – The Force; Little Joe y La Familia – No Quiero Mas Amar	
1985	La Mafia	Hot Stuff		
1986	Mazz	No. 16		
1987	La Mafia	1986		
1988	Mazz	Beyond		
1989	David Marez	Sold Out		
1990	Latin Breed	Breaking the Rules		
1991	Little Joe y La Familia	No Te Olvidare	La Sombra – Good Boys; La Fiebre – On the Rise	
1992	Mazz	Para Nuestra Gente		
1993	Selena	Entre a Mi Mundo	Culturas – Culturas; Mazz – Lo Hare Por Ti	
1994	Selena	Live	Mazz – Romanticos Que Nunca; Ramiro Herrera – Pensamientos	
1995	Selena	Amor Prohibido	Mazz – Que Es Spada; Gary Hobbs – Se Que Hasta Corre	
1996	Mazz	Solo Para Ti	Inocencia – Ahora; Letty Guval – Amor de Mis Amores; David Olivares – Aqui Esta; Bob Gallarza – Body & Soul; Elsa García – Diez; Joel Nava – Joel Nava & The Border; Fandango USA – Mas De tu Amor; Ruben Ramos – Nueve Vidas; Gary Hobbs – Soy el Mismo; Jay Perez – The Voice; Ram Herrera – Ven Mi Amor	
1997	Pete Astudillo	Como Te Extrano	Jennifer Pena – Dulzura; Mazz – Mariachi y Tradicion	
1998	Bobby Pulido	Llegaste A Me Vida		
1999	Mazz	Cuantas Veces	Elida Reyna – EYA 1998; Emilio Navaira – A Mi Gente	
2000	Kumbia Kings	Amor, Familia y Respeto	David Lee Garza – Nadie Como Yo; Jay Perez – Siempre Contigo	
2001	Mazz	Quien Iva A Pensar		
2002	Kumbia Kings	Shhh!	Jay Perez – De Mi Corasoul; Mazz – Siempre Humilde	
2003	Mazz	Si Me Faltas Tu	Jay Perez – Hombre en La Luna; Ram Herrera – Ingrata; Jennifer Pena – Libre; Chris Perez – Una Noche Mas	
2004	Mazz	Live En El Valle		
2005–2008	Not awarded			
2009	Mazz	The Legend Continues	Elida Reyna – Domingo; Jay Perez – La Voz del 2008; Ruben Ramos – Viva la Revolución; TexMex Kadillaks – Me Gusta Tu	
2010–2012	Not awarded			
2013	Los Hermanos Farias	Los Hermanos Farias	Elida Reyna – Domingo; Jay Perez – La Voz del 2008; Ruben Ramos – Viva la Revolución; TexMex Kadillaks – Me Gusta Tu	

== See also ==
- Music of Texas
