= Lauro Cruz =

American politician (1933–2017)

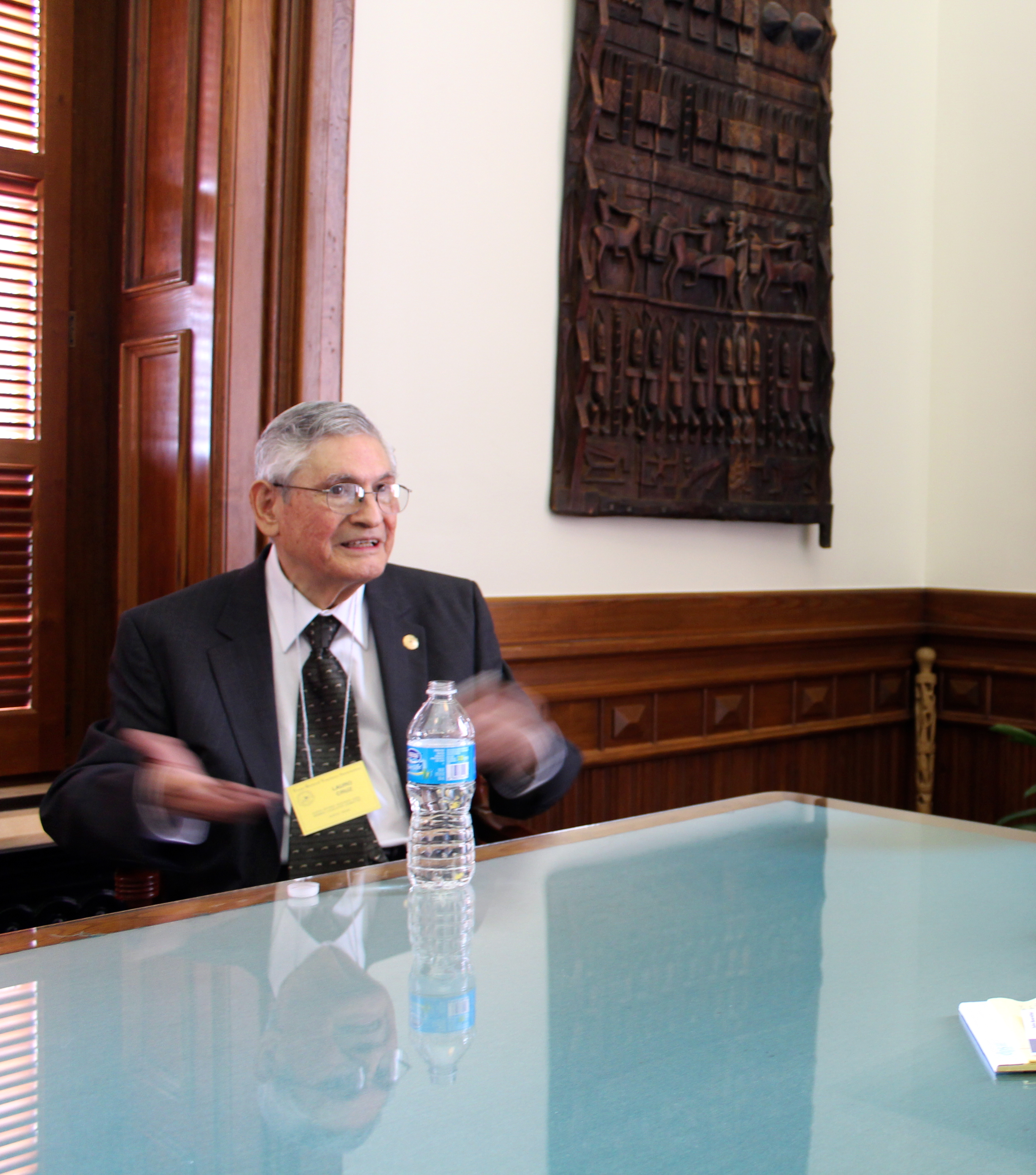
- Lauro Cruz from Texas

Member of the Texas House of Representatives from the 23rd district
- In office 1967–1971
- Succeeded by: Ben T. Reyes

Member of the Texas House of Representatives from the 115th district
- In office 1967–1971

Personal details
- Born: May 20, 1933 Beaumont, Texas
- Died: January 29, 2017 (aged 83) Austin, Texas
- Party: Democratic
- Spouse: Alice Clarice Sebesta Cruz
- Relations: Chris, Camille, Jerry, Catherine
- Education: BA, Political Science, University of Houston
- Profession: Politician

Lauro Cruz (20 May 1933-January 29, 2017) was an American state politician who served as a member of the Texas House of Representatives from a district in Harris County, Texas. Cruz was the first Mexican-American legislator to be elected in Harris County since Lorenzo De Zavala in 1836. A Democrat who served three terms, Cruz focused on the areas of minimum wage, rights for farm workers, and migrant worker housing and transportation.

== Early life ==
Born in Beaumont to Manuel Cruz and Margarita Menchaca, Lauro Cruz moved to Houston, Texas with his family when he was six months old, where his father owned and operated a grocery store. He enlisted for the United States Marine Corps Reserve during the Korean War in his second year of high school, and completed his GED in the Marines before being honorably discharged. Upon returning to Houston, he applied to be a bus driver with the Metropolitan Transit Authority of Harris County and became their first Mexican-American driver. Later, he decided he wanted to attend college, explaining "I…wanted to go to college and the problem was I didn't know how to enroll. So, I just went over to the University of Houston and I said how do I get in here, you know? Somebody said you go to the admissions office and I said OK. Anyway, I ended up there." He received a BA in political science from the University of Houston.

== Political career ==
As a State Representative, Cruz worked primarily in the areas of minimum wage and rights for farm workers and migrant workers. His interest in the topics developed after he was approached by activists organizing a march on Austin for farm workers' rights in 1966. As a young legislator without much bargaining power, Cruz explained his method for gaining support: "...I would approach him every day and I'd say, 'John,' I said, 'are you going to vote for minimum wage?' Kept asking until the other legislator needed something in return."

After three terms in the legislature, Cruz began to run out of savings from his grocery business before he was a legislator. Sensing that it was time to "move up or move out," Cruz ran unsuccessfully for State Treasurer in 1972 to Jesse James. Cruz explained, "...how can I beat a guy with a name like Jesse James?" Maybe I ought to change my name to Pancho Villa, you know."

== Post-legislative career ==
After leaving the legislature, Cruz became involved with the Dolph Briscoe gubernatorial campaign. After Governor Briscoe's election, he became the only Mexican-American special assistant to the Governor. Cruz used his position to push for fairer hiring practices for Mexican-Americans, asking state agencies for records of every Hispanic employed by the agency and their position. Later, he was asked by the governor to head the Greater South Texas Cultural Basin Commission, aimed at bringing economic development to South Texas.

After leaving the Governor's staff, Cruz became the head of the Texas Good Neighbor Commission. Wanting to stay close to his friends and family in Texas, Cruz opted to pursue work as a lobbyist and became one of the first Hispanic independent lobbyists in Texas.

In 1988, Cruz approached the Dean of the Lyndon B. Johnson School of Public Affairs and proposed a leadership training program geared toward Mexican Americans called the Innovations88 Leadership Program, aimed at "...trying to get people more information on public policy, give them some skills in the area of parliamentary procedure, more than just a motion and a second."
