= Texas A&M University Press =

Scholarly publishing house of Texas A&M university

- Parent company: Texas A&M University
- Founded: 1974
- Country of origin: United States
- Headquarters location: College Station, Texas
- Distribution: self-distribution (US); East-West Export Books (Asia, Australia, Hawaii); Eurospan Group (EMEA); Scholarly Book Services (Canada)
- Publication types: Books
- Official website: www.tamupress.com

Texas A&M University Press (also known informally as TAMU Press) is a scholarly publishing house associated with Texas A&M University. It was founded in 1974 and is located in College Station, Texas, in the United States.

== Overview ==
The Texas A&M University Press was founded in 1974 under the direction of Texas A&M University president and chancellor Jack K. Williams. The first director of the press, Frank H. Wardlaw, had previously helped to establish the University of Texas Press and the University of South Carolina Press. From its founding, the press has operated as a university department, reporting directly to the university president. The press is expected to "further the objectives of the university through publications devoted to advancing knowledge among scholars and to enriching the cultural heritage of the Southwest."

The original press offices were destroyed by a fire in February 1979. They were replaced in 1983 with the construction of the John H. Lindsey Building. This allows for offices, the warehouse, and a shipping area to be consolidated under one roof.

The press is funded by book sales, an endowment, and financial support from Texas A&M University.

== Works ==
In September 1975, the press published its first work, Elizabeth A. H. John's Storms Brewed in Other Men's Worlds. Within a decade, the press had begun publishing over thirty titles a year.

The press has published works in several series designed to feature regional history. Among these are the Centennial Series of the Association of Former Students, which concerns aspects of Texas A&M's history, the Montague History of Oil Series, the Texas A&M Southwestern Studies Series, and the Clayton Wheat Williams Texas Life Series. Additionally, the press has developed a series featuring regional art, the Joe and Betty Moore Texas Art Series, one dealing with regional literature (the Tarleton State University Southwestern Studies in the Humanities), and the Louise Lindsey Merrick Texas Environment Series and the W.L. Moody, Jr. Natural History Series, which cover natural history. Fiction and nonfiction of the 19th and 20th centuries are also reprinted as part of the Southwest Landmarks series. The press has also published works dealing with military history, architecture, business history, chemistry, economics, veterinary medicine, nautical archeology and engineering.

Apart from its own publications, the press also distributes books from various other university presses, including Texas Review Press, the University of North Texas Press, and Texas Christian University Press, as well as books from the Texas State Historical Association.

== See also ==
- List of English-language book publishing companies
- List of university presses
