= Felix Tijerina =

Mexican-American restaurateur, activist, and philanthropist

25th President of the LULAC
- In office 1956–1960
- Preceded by: Oscar M. Laurel
- Succeeded by: Hector Godinez

Personal details
- Born: April 29, 1905 General Escobedo, Nuevo León, Mexico
- Died: September 4, 1965 (aged 60) Houston, Texas, U.S.

Felix Tijerina (1905–1965) was a Mexican-American restaurateur, activist, and philanthropist in Houston, Texas. He served as the 25th president of the League of United Latin American Citizens.

== History ==
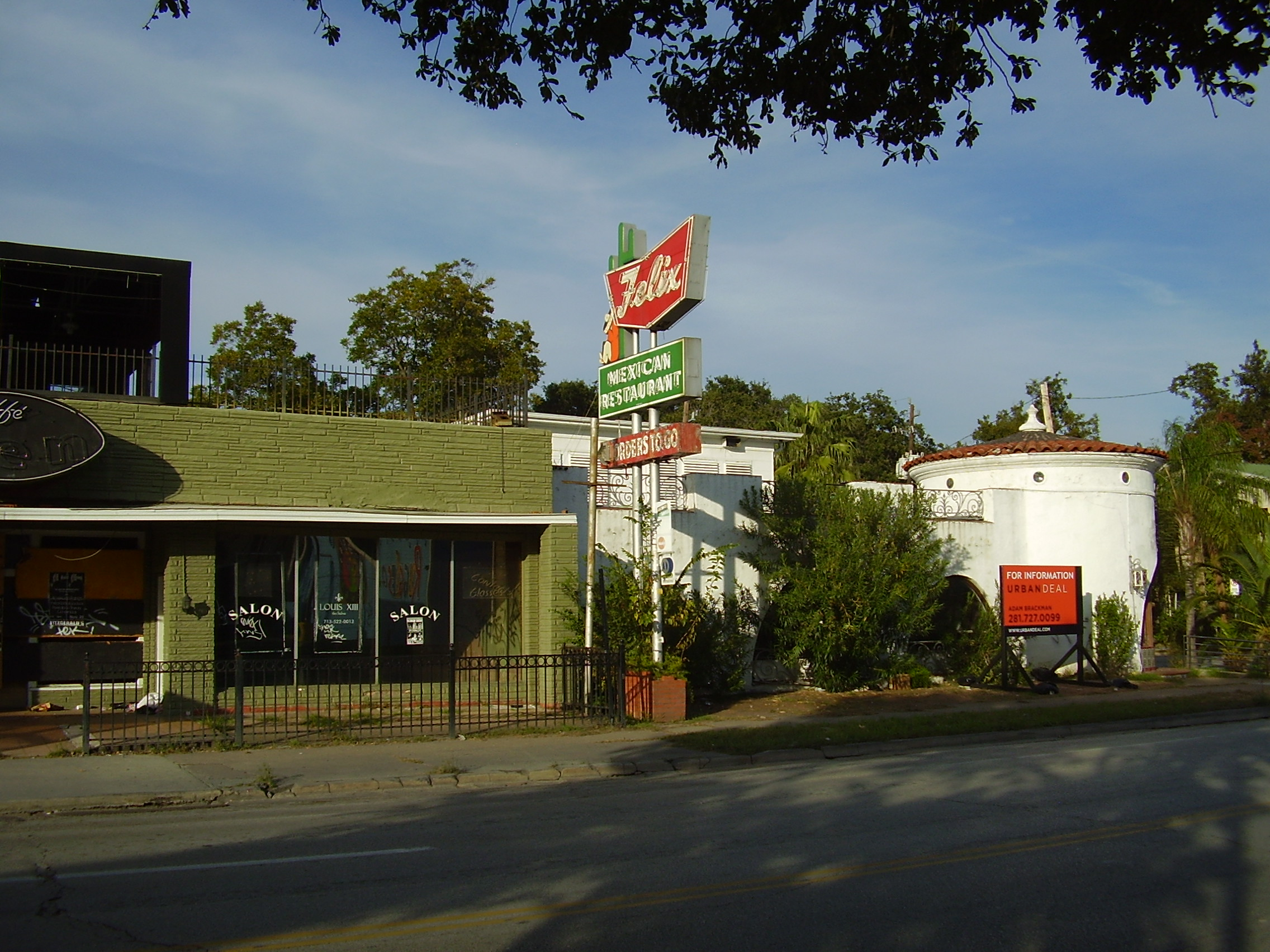
The former location of the final Felix Mexican Restaurant operation

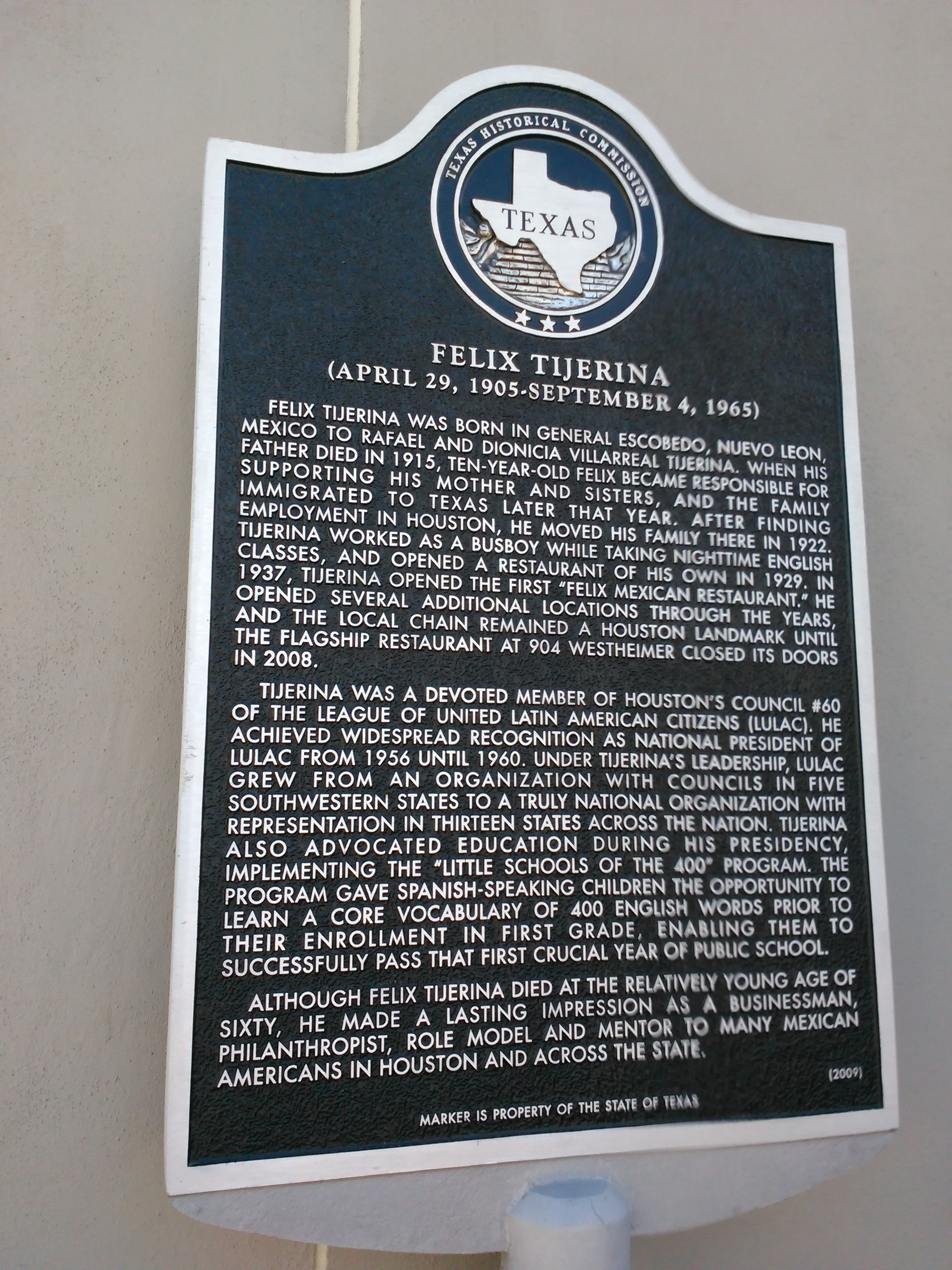
Felix Tijerina historical marker

Tijerina was born in General Escobedo, Nuevo León, Mexico; He had claimed to have been born in Sugar Land, Texas. In 1918 he became a busboy at the Original Mexican Restaurant, the first Tex-Mex restaurant in Houston. Tijerina taught himself English and became a friend and associate of the owner of the restaurant. Tijerina became the manager of the restaurant, located in what is now downtown Houston.

Tijerina opened his own restaurant in 1929. In a fashion similar to his mentors, Tijerina described his restaurant's food as authentic, but catered the food to the tastes of white Americans. The Great Depression forced the closure of his first restaurant. Tijerina became a beer truck driver. His wife, Janie, gambled on a horse and won, allowing the family to start the restaurant a second time. Tijerina started another restaurant in 1937 in what is now the Neartown area of Houston. Tijerina opened other restaurants in other locations. In addition Tijerina became prominent in Houston politics. He became friends with many politicians, including Lewis Wesley Cutrer, Roy Hofheinz, and R.E. "Bob" Smith, and was the first Mexican American to serve on the board of the Houston Housing Authority. In 1956 Tijerina became the national president of the League of United Latin American Citizens (LULAC) and served four consecutive annual terms. He started LULAC's Little School of the 400 program, intended to teach English to non-English speaking children before they entered school.

Robb Walsh of the Houston Press said that "Tijerina's story is a study in assimilation. His mission was to help Mexican-Americans merge into the American mainstream as successfully as he had" and that "Early Mexican restaurants like Felix's were among the first institutions where urban Anglos and Hispanics rubbed elbows. Tijerina's Americanized version of Mexican cooking was what brought the races together. And it was a triumph of diplomacy." Walsh added that Tijerina's style of cooking "was not about bringing authentic Mexican flavors to Texas; it was about putting Anglos at ease with things Mexican." Walsh stated that "His floury chili gravy and fluffy chili con queso were not far from brown gravy and cheese dip, and the spicing of his sauces was nonconfrontational to the delicate Anglo palate."

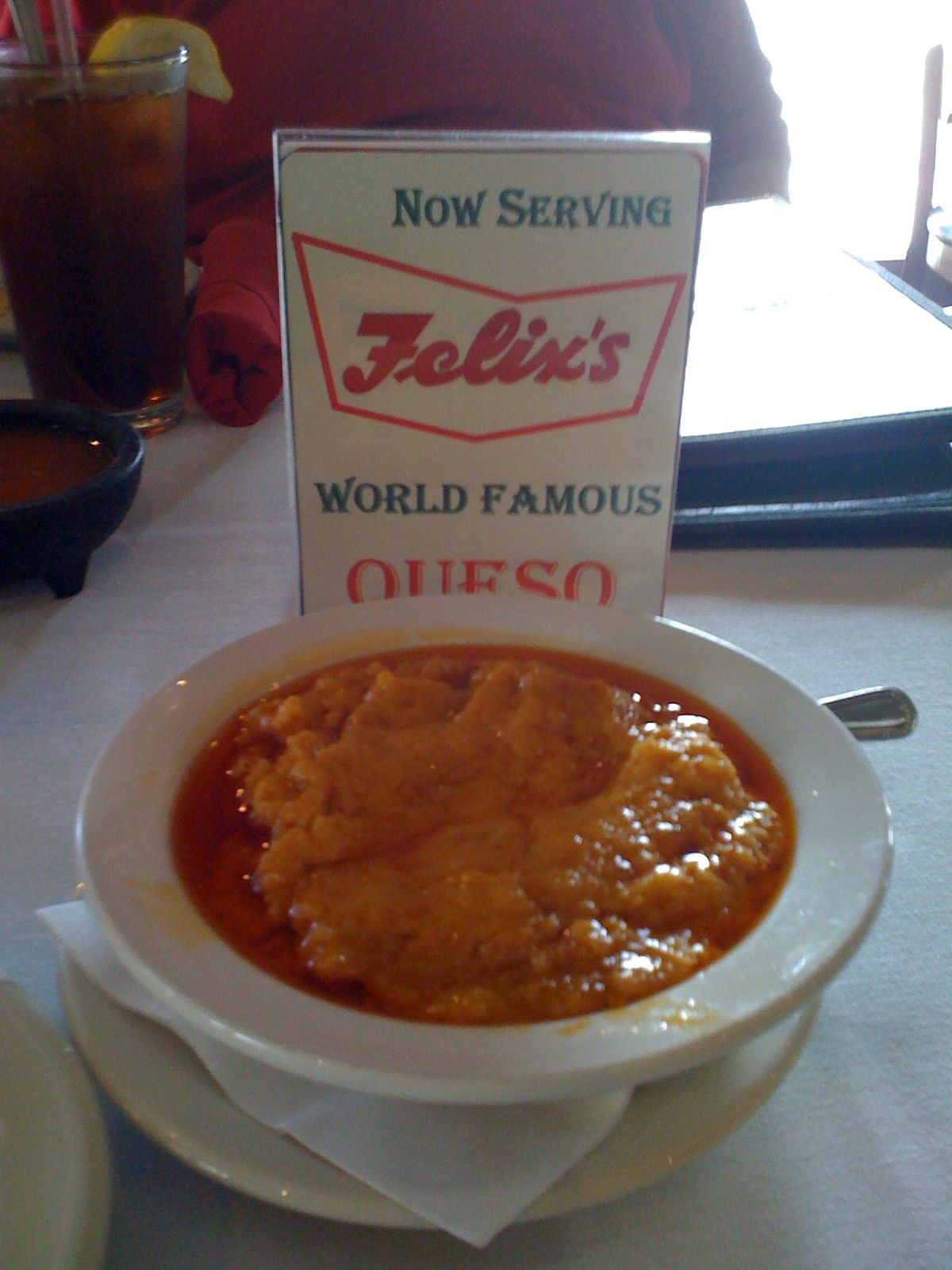
Felix-style chile con queso

Tijerina did not support civil rights for African Americans or allying with black civil rights groups like the NAACP, despite having mutual interests against school segregation in Texas. When some fellow Mexican-American colleagues in LULAC suggested working with the NAACP, Tijerina reprimanded them, saying “Let the Negro fight his own battles. His problems are not mine. I don't want to ally with him.”

Tijerina died in 1965. Janie took over the operations of the restaurant chain, Felix Mexican Restaurants. In 1971 the chain had six restaurants in Houston and one in Beaumont. The last Felix's restaurant, located in Montrose, closed in 2008. After the closure, Scott Sullivan, an owner of the El Patio Mexican Restaurant chain, reached an agreement with Felix Tijerina Jr. to license Felix's name and recipes, which led to Felix's chile con queso becoming a permanent addition to El Patio's menu.

Walsh compared Felix's food to "scratchy recordings of the Delta blues", as in it was an illustration of the history of an evolving cuisine.

== Legacy ==
Felix Tijerina Elementary School, a Houston Independent School District campus which opened in 1979 to serve the Central Park community, was named after Tijerina.

== See also ==
- History of the Mexican-Americans in Houston
- Tex-Mex cuisine in Houston
- Molina's Cantina
- Ninfa's
- Mario Gallegos, Jr.
- Ninfa Laurenzo
- Rick Noriega
- Ben Reyes
- South Park Mexican
- Jim Goode
- Percy Creuzot
