= Percy Creuzot =

American restaurateur (1924–2010)

Percy Pennington "Frenchy" Creuzot Jr. (May 28, 1924 – June 6, 2010) was a restaurateur who founded Frenchy's Chicken in Houston, Texas. Due to his success, he became known as "the black Colonel Sanders."

== Life and business ==
On May 28, 1924, Creuzot was born in New Orleans. His father, Dr. Percy P. Creuzot Sr., was a doctor. Creuzot Jr. served in the United States Navy in World War II and received an honorable discharge in 1946. In 1949 he graduated from the Hampton Institute, now known as Hampton University. In the 1950s he worked as an insurance agent. Creuzot stated he was losing money selling insurance, so he moved to Houston.

In Houston Creuzot initially wanted to establish a Louisiana-style sausage business, but he found that it would be more costly than he originally believed because the Texas and federal authorities had increased regulations on those types of businesses.

He arrived in Houston in 1965. Herff-Jones Jewelry, an Indiana-based manufacturing company of high school graduation supplies hired Creuzot as a salesperson for the black high schools in Houston. On the side, Creuzot sold New Orleans-style sno-balls. After desegregation allowed employees to serve schools of any race, the company reduced its workforce and laid off Creuzot. Creuzot found that his new job at the Texas Workforce Commission did not pay enough to "buy the grits and grease" and he "wanted to live a little better." Creuzot established Frenchy's in 1969. Prior to the opening of the restaurant, Creuzot was not known by the nickname "Frenchy". He gained the nickname "Frenchy's" because people associated the name of the restaurant with him.

By 1985 Creuzot had purchased property in Galveston.

On Sunday June 6, 2010, Creuzot died of a stroke, at age 86. His funeral was held at St. Peter the Apostle Catholic Church. His grave is located at Forest Lawn Cemetery in Houston.

== Philanthropy and other efforts ==
Creuzot constantly supported Texas Southern University (TSU). Governor of Texas Bill Clements appointed Creuzot to the board of regents. He eventually was elected vice chair, and he served for twelve years. He also served on the board of directors of Catholic Charities. In addition he was a member of restaurant associations at the Houston, Texas, and national levels and he also was a member of the Houston Citizens Review Board.

In 1986 Mayor of Houston Kathy Whitmire appointed Creuzot to be one of the 16 members of her "Visions for Houston" panel.

Creuzot had an affiliation with the Greater Houston Visitors & Convention Center, and he was a member of the National Association for the Advancement of Colored People (NAACP). He was a member of the Knights of St. Peter Claver and the fraternities Alpha Phi Alpha and Sigma Pi Phi.

Creuzot gave money to Hampton University, TSU, the NAACP, the United Negro College Fund, University of Houston, and Xavier University.

== Personal life ==
He married Sallie Coleman in 1947 and had three children: Percy III, Angele, and John C. Percy III became the owner of the original Frenchy's, and for a period Angele operated a Frenchy's on South Shepherd in Neartown. John C. Creuzot became a state district judge; and was later elected the District Attorney of Dallas County, Texas, in 2018. Creuzot also had 3 sisters, Alexa Delahoussaye, Hortense Turner, and Martina Cox. After his death, he was survived by his sister Martina, wife, and children.

He was also a life-long Catholic who served on the board of the Catholic Charities of the Archdiocese of Galveston-Houston.

== See also ==
- History of the African-Americans in Houston
- Jim Goode, restaurateur who founded Goode Company
- Ninfa Laurenzo, Mexican-American restaurateur who founded Ninfa's
- Felix Tijerina, restaurateur who founded Felix's
- Our Mother of Mercy Catholic Church (Louisiana Creole Church in Houston)
