= Ninfa Laurenzo =

Texas restaurateur

Maria Ninfa Rodriguez Laurenzo
- Born: May 11, 1924; Harlingen, Texas, US
- Died: June 17, 2001 (aged 77); Houston, Texas, US
- Education: Durhan Business School
- Occupation: Restaurateur
- Years active: 1949–2001
- Known for: Founding of Ninfa's restaurant
- Political party: Republican
- Board member of: 7: Gulf Coast Regional Blood Center; Houston Community College System Foundation; Houston International Festival Foundation; Houston Hispanic Forum; Houston Metro Authority; John F. Kennedy Center for the Performing Arts; University Cancer Foundation-M.D. Anderson Cancer Center
- Spouse: Domenic Laurenzo (1946–1969, his death)
- Children: 4
- Awards: 7: Texas Restaurant Association "Woman Restaurateur of the Year" (1979); Texas Women's Hall of Fame inductee (1988); National Hispanic Chamber of Commerce "Business Woman of the Year" (1994); Humanitarian Award of the Arthritis Foundation; Roundtable for Women in Foodservices' "Women in Foodservice Pacesetter's Award"; U.S. Hispanic Chamber of Commerce "Business Recognition Award"; University Cancer Foundation-M.D. Anderson Cancer Center
- Website: theninfalaurenzoscholarshipfund.org

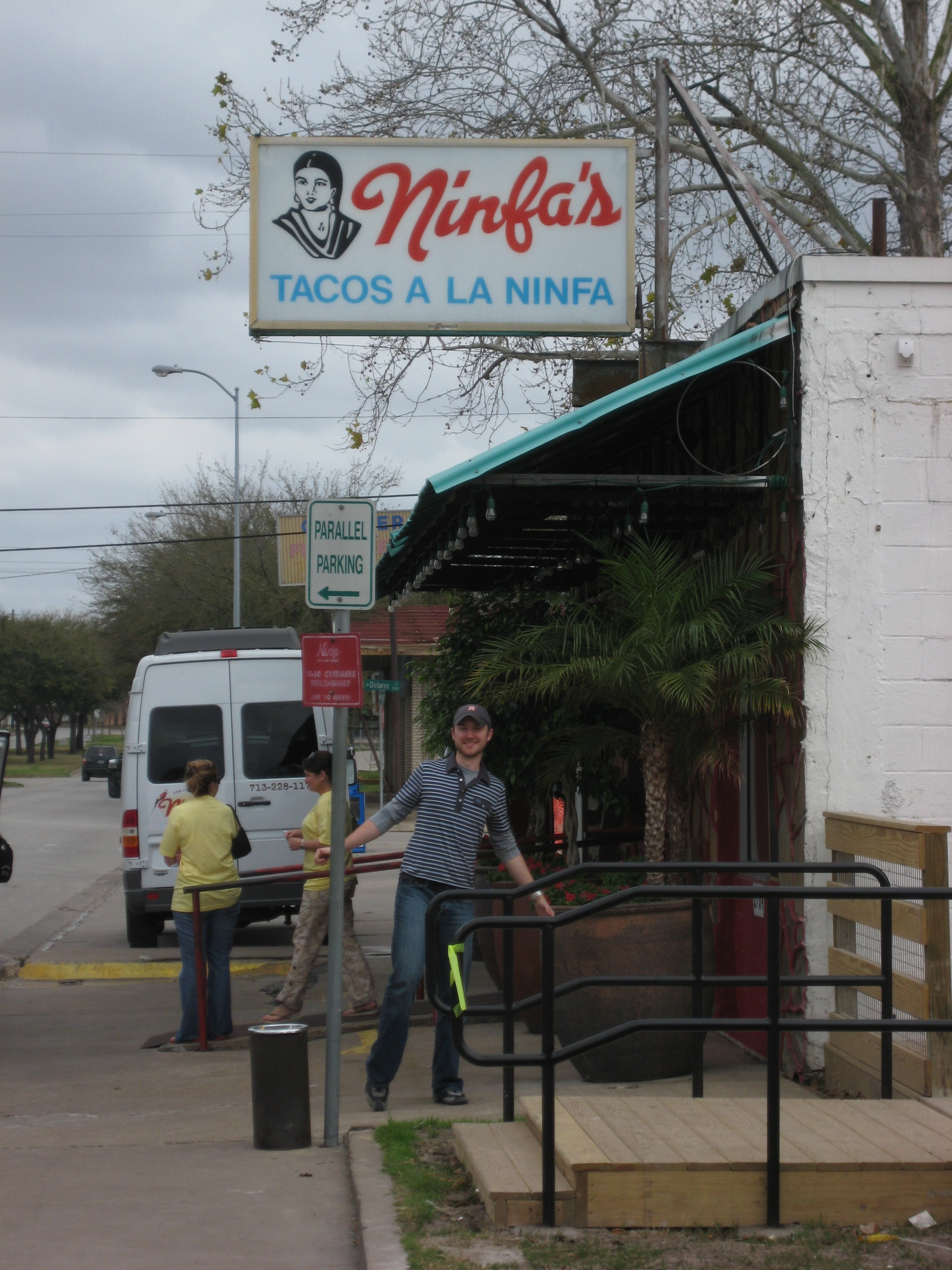
Original Ninfa's on Navigation Boulevard

Maria Ninfa Rodriguez Laurenzo (nicknamed Mama Ninfa, May 11, 1924 – June 17, 2001), born with the family name Rodriguez, was an American restaurateur from Houston, Texas, who founded the restaurant Ninfa's. Laurenzo started out running a single taco stand in Houston, Texas.

== History ==
=== Early history ===
Ninfa Rodriguez, a Mexican-American Catholic, was born on May 11, 1924, in Harlingen, Texas. Rodriguez, one of twelve brothers and sisters, was raised in Harlingen. She graduated from Henrietta M. King High School in Kingsville and Durham Business School in Harlingen. Rodriguez's father grew crops in a patch of farmland in the Rio Grande Valley.

In 1945 she visited her twin sister, Pilar Di Meo, in Providence, Rhode Island. During her visit, she met Domenic Thomas Laurenzo, a graduate of the Massachusetts Institute of Technology. Laurenzo, a native of Rhode Island, was of Italian descent. Rodriguez, who had nicknamed Domenic Laurenzo "D.T.," married him. In 1947 their first child, Roland, was born. The couple considered whether to move to Houston or Los Angeles. They read a 1948 newspaper article that stated that Houston was the fastest growing city in the United States. Tony Mandola, Ninfa Laurenzo's son in law and a member of the Mandola restaurant family, said that they decided to go to Houston after flipping a coin.

In 1949, they opened the Rio Grande Tortilla Company factory, which sold pizza dough and tortillas. The couple entered the business even though both of them had professional degrees. The factory was located in a Hispanic community in the East End. The Laurenzos lived in a wooden frame house next to the factory. The couple had four more children, with Jack born in 1949, Phyllis born in 1953, Tom born in 1958, and Gino born in 1963. The family sent the children to an area parochial private school.

Domenic Laurenzo died of a brain hemorrhage in 1969.

=== Restaurateur career ===
Ninfa Laurenzo's factory was in trouble due to increased competition and decreased profit margins. In 1973 Laurenzo opened a 10 table restaurant in front of her tortilla factory in order to financially stay afloat. The restaurant, Ninfa's, became very popular and it became her core business. She did not have prior restaurant management experience. While at the restaurant, Laurenzo greeted guests, watched over the kitchen operations, and sometimes sang songs in an alto voice. Joe Pratt, a professor of business and history of the University of Houston, said "In the 1980s, Ninfa became a symbol of the city's growing diversity and the opportunity for people who hadn't always had opportunities here. She is a powerful image in Houston."

In addition to Ninfa's, as part of RioStar Corp. Ninfa Laurenzo and her family established other restaurant ventures. Laurenzo had developed Diego's, a fast food takeout restaurant that specialized in soft tacos. The family sold Diego's to partners in 1978. In April 1987 Laurenzo started "Bambolino's Italian Drive-Thru," a restaurant offering pizza by the slice. She also established Joey Jack's Seafood, a seafood restaurant. Bambolino's was the Laurenzo family's second attempt in making an Italian-American restaurant. In 1986 it started Laurenzo's Italian Bar & Grille, a full-service restaurant developed by Ninfa's personnel for McFaddin Ventures, which was involved in a joint venture with Ninfa's. Laurenzo's Italian Bar & Grille lost $461,000 in three months, and McFaddin Ventures closed it in August of that year. The Laurenzo family hoped that the increasing trend of carry-out food would help the Bambolino's success. RioStar acquired several Atchafalaya River Cafes, and then later closed and sold several of them. Laura Elder of the Houston Business Journal said that RioStar had "tried an experiment with Italian food that didn't pan out."

In 1996 RioStar operated several Ninfa's locations, one Bambolino's restaurant, and one Atchafalaya River Cafe. In October of that year, Sysco filed an involuntary bankruptcy petition against RioStar in an attempt to force the company to pay $2.8 million in debts accumulated from the company's expansion. RioStar filed for Chapter 11 bankruptcy protection. In 1998 Serrano's Cafe, an Austin, Texas-based company, acquired RioStar as part of the bankruptcy protection settlement. The family was no longer involved in Ninfa's.

=== Personal life ===
Laurenzo resided in the Second Ward.

Many people referred to Ninfa Laurenzo as simply "Mama." Her daughter, Phyllis Laurenzo Mandola, said "[i]t seems like everyone in the world would call her Mama" and that Ninfa Laurenzo did not mind if someone called her "Mama" unless the person was a man who was older than she was. Many people who knew Laurenzo considered her a mother figure, and Tony Mandola, Phyllis's husband, said "Everybody knew that they could come to her for advice."

Laurenzo sat on the boards of several foundations and organizations. She was a founding board member, in 1970, for the Association for the Advancement of Mexican Americans (AAMA). Later board positions included those of the Gulf Coast Regional Blood Center, the Houston Community College System Foundation, the Houston International Festival Foundation, the Houston Hispanic Forum, the Houston Metro Authority, the John F. Kennedy Center for the Performing Arts, and the University Cancer Foundation-M.D. Anderson Cancer Center.

=== Political involvement ===
Laurenzo participated in Republican politics. She was a personal friend of President George H. W. Bush. In 1984, Bush, then Vice President, appointed her as one of the five goodwill ambassadors to welcome Pope John Paul II in Puerto Rico. Laurenzo's children said that this was the proudest moment in her life. In 1988, while in New Orleans, Louisiana, she delivered a speech that seconded Bush's nomination for president in that year's election. She led the Pledge of Allegiance at the opening session of the 1992 Republican National Convention on August 17, 1992.

=== Health and death ===
In June 1999 Laurenzo was diagnosed with breast cancer. Breast cancer killed three of her sisters, including her twin sister Pilar. Laurenzo served as the key note speaker of a cancer forum, giving a speech to 2,000 people. The forum was sponsored by the Reach to Recovery of the American Cancer Society. In 2000 she underwent a mastectomy to treat her breast cancer.

Ninfa Laurenzo died of bone cancer at the age of 77, on Sunday June 17, 2001. Members of Houston's business and political communities attended her funeral. On the week of her death, members of Houston City Council postponed their meeting so they could attend Laurenzo's funeral.

== Awards and honors ==
In 1979 the Texas Restaurant Association gave her the "Woman Restaurateur of the Year" award. In 1988 Laurenzo was inducted into the Texas Women's Hall of Fame. The National Hispanic Chamber of Commerce gave her the 1994 "Business Woman of the Year" award. She also received the Humanitarian Award of the Arthritis Foundation, the "Women in Foodservice Pacesetter's Award" of the Roundtable for Women in Foodservice, and the "Business Recognition Award" of the U.S. Hispanic Chamber of Commerce. Rosemary Kent, the author of the 1981 edition of The Genuine Texas Handbook, listed Laurenzo as a person to include in a hypothetical Texas chef hall of fame.

Laurenzo, a grandmother of a student at The Regis School of the Sacred Heart, was honored at the annual "The Regis Merci" celebration on Wednesday April 13, 1994. The celebration honors individuals who were instrumental to the school's operations. Mayor of Houston Bob Lanier declared that day "Ninfa Laurenzo Day" and presented this proclamation to her at the celebration.

== Legacy ==
Since Laurenzo's death, her children became involved in restaurant ventures in the United States. Roland Laurenzo, his wife Blanca, and their son Domenic operated two El Tiempo Cantina locations which has now grown to eight El Tiempo Cantina Restaurants, Laurenzo's restaurant and an El Tiempo Taqueria. They also have three other sons; Dante, Rocco and Joseph who also help with the family restaurant business. Phyllis Laurenzo Mandola and her husband Tony Mandola operate Tony Mandola's Gulf Coast Kitchen. The Mandolas also own a small restaurant shop located beneath the triangle in Austin, TX. Gino Laurenzo operates Rio Grande Tex-Mex Grill in Washington Mills, New York. The family later established the restaurant "Laurenzo's" on Washington Avenue. Domenic Laurenzo served as the lead chef. Other individuals involved in the original Ninfa's business became involved in restaurant ventures in Greater Houston.

The Ninfa R. Laurenzo Early Childhood Center, a Houston Independent School District school, is named after her. It opened in the fall of 2004.

Michael Cordúa, who established the Cordúa restaurant chain, credited Laurenzo as an inspiration as he had asked her for advice.

== See also ==
- History of the Mexican-Americans in Houston
- Tex-Mex cuisine in Houston

Tex-Mex and Mexican restaurants:

- Molina's Cantina
- Taqueria Arandas

Hispanics and Latinos from Houston:

- Mario Gallegos, Jr.
- Rick Noriega
- Ben Reyes
- South Park Mexican
- Felix Tijerina

Prominent restaurateurs from Houston:

- Percy Creuzot, Louisiana Creole restaurateur who opened Frenchy's
- Jim Goode, Texan restaurateur who opened Goode Company
