= BCSA =

BCSA may refer to:

- Baltimore County State's Attorney
- Bible College of South Australia
- Book Collectors Society of Australia
- British Columbia Soccer Association
- British Constructional Steelwork Association
