= Susan Hawk (district attorney) =

American lawyer

District Attorney of Dallas County, Texas
- In office 2015 – September 6, 2016
- Preceded by: Craig Watkins
- Succeeded by: Faith Johnson

Personal details
- Born: Susan Lynn McWithey c. 1970 United States
- Party: Republican
- Spouse(s): Bryan P. Reese (m. 1997; ann. 1997) P. Michael Hawk (m. 1999; div. 2004) John Geiser (m. 2012; div. 2015)
- Education: Lamar High School
- Alma mater: Texas Tech University, 1992; Texas Wesleyan University School of Law in Fort Worth, 1995

Susan Hawk (born Susan Lynn McWithey) is an American attorney. She was the Dallas County District Attorney, elected as a Republican in 2014, until her resignation on October 1, 2016. Her opponent was Democrat Craig Watkins. She is the first female district attorney elected in Dallas. She was previously a state criminal district judge for nine years.

== Education and career ==
Raised in Arlington, Texas, Hawk attended Lamar High School, and graduated from Texas Tech University in 1992 and from Texas Wesleyan University Law School in Fort Worth in 1995.

She is a Republican attorney. Prior to being district attorney (DA), she was a Texas District 291 court judge from 2002 to 2013.

Susan Hawk resigned on September 6, 2016, two years before her term expired. In a statement she said "I believe our office is making a difference and I want to continue to do good work. But last fall upon returning from treatment, I made a commitment to step away from the office if I felt I could no longer do my job and, unfortunately, I've reached that point as my health needs my full attention in the coming months".

== Personal life ==
Hawk has been married three times. She married Bryan P. Reese, a lawyer, in 1997 at age 27 and that marriage was annulled five months later. In 1999, she married her second husband, Phillip Michael Hawk (known as Michael Hawk), also a lawyer. She divorced Michael Hawk four years later when she was 33 years old. Her third husband, John Geiser, an anesthesiologist, whom she married in 2012, filed for divorce from her in January 2015.
