= John Creuzot =

American lawyer and judge

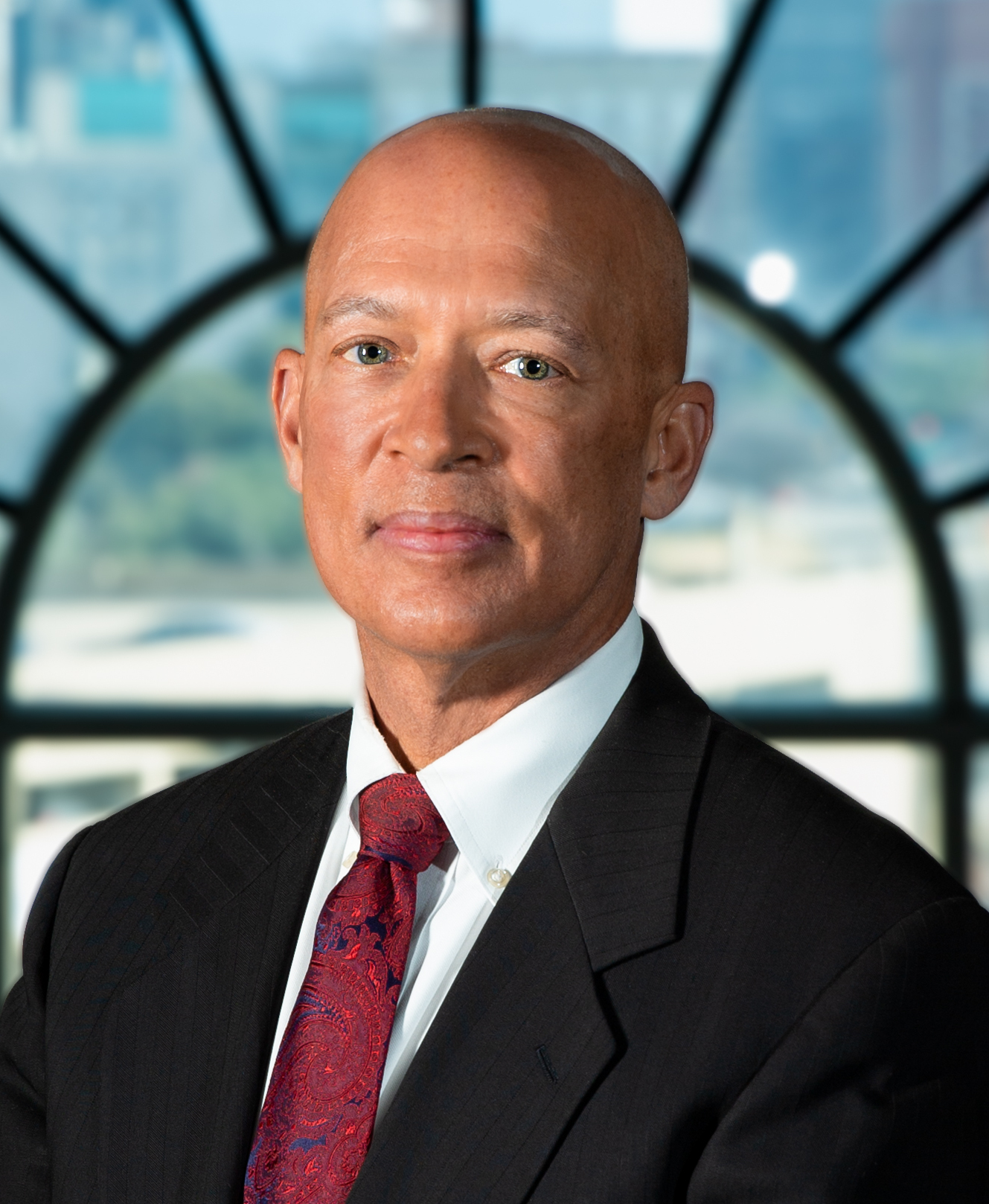
- Creuzot in 2022

Dallas County District Attorney
- Incumbent
- Assumed office January 1, 2019
- Preceded by: Faith Johnson

Personal details
- Born: John Creuzot New Orleans, Louisiana, U.S.
- Party: Democratic
- Parent: Percy Creuzot (father)
- Education: University of North Texas (BA); Dedman School of Law (JD)
- Occupation: Lawyer

John Creuzot is an American lawyer and retired judge serving as the Dallas County District Attorney since 2019. Creuzot sought a third term but lost re-election in the Democratic primary to Amber Givens in 2026.

== Biography ==
Creuzot was born in New Orleans and moved to Houston when he was nine with his family. He is African-American. In 1969, his father, Percy "Frenchy" Creuzot, Jr., founded Frenchy's Chicken, a restaurant chain in Houston, Texas, selling Louisiana Creole cuisine. Creuzot completed an undergraduate degree in philosophy from the University of North Texas in 1978. He earned a J.D. from Southern Methodist University School of Law in 1982

As a felony district court judge in 1998, Creuzot founded the Dallas Initiative for Diversion and Expedited Rehabilitation and Treatment (DIVERT court). This program diverted nonviolent drug offenders to treatment and counseling programs, resulting in a 60% reduction in recidivism and substantial cost savings Following his retirement from the judiciary, Dallas County, Texas renamed its drug treatment facility the Judge John C. Creuzot Judicial Treatment Center in May 2013.

In 2018, Creuzot was elected to the office of Dallas County Criminal District Attorney. He retained the office in a 2022 election. Creuzot's 2022 campaign received its largest contribution from the George Soros-funded Texas Justice and Public Safety PAC. On March 3, 2026, Creuzot would lose the Democratic primary to former Judge Amber Givens by a margin of 54% to 46%.

== Personal life ==
He is a member of Holy Trinity Catholic Church and lives in East Dallas.

== Awards and honors ==
- University of North Texas President’s Award and Outstanding Alumni Award
- Dallas Observer Best Criminal Judge Award
- Southern Methodist University School of Law Outstanding Alumni Award
- Dallas Bar Association “Trial Lawyer of the Year” Award (2024)

== See also ==
- List of African American jurists
