= Molina's Cantina =

Restaurant chain in Houston, Texas

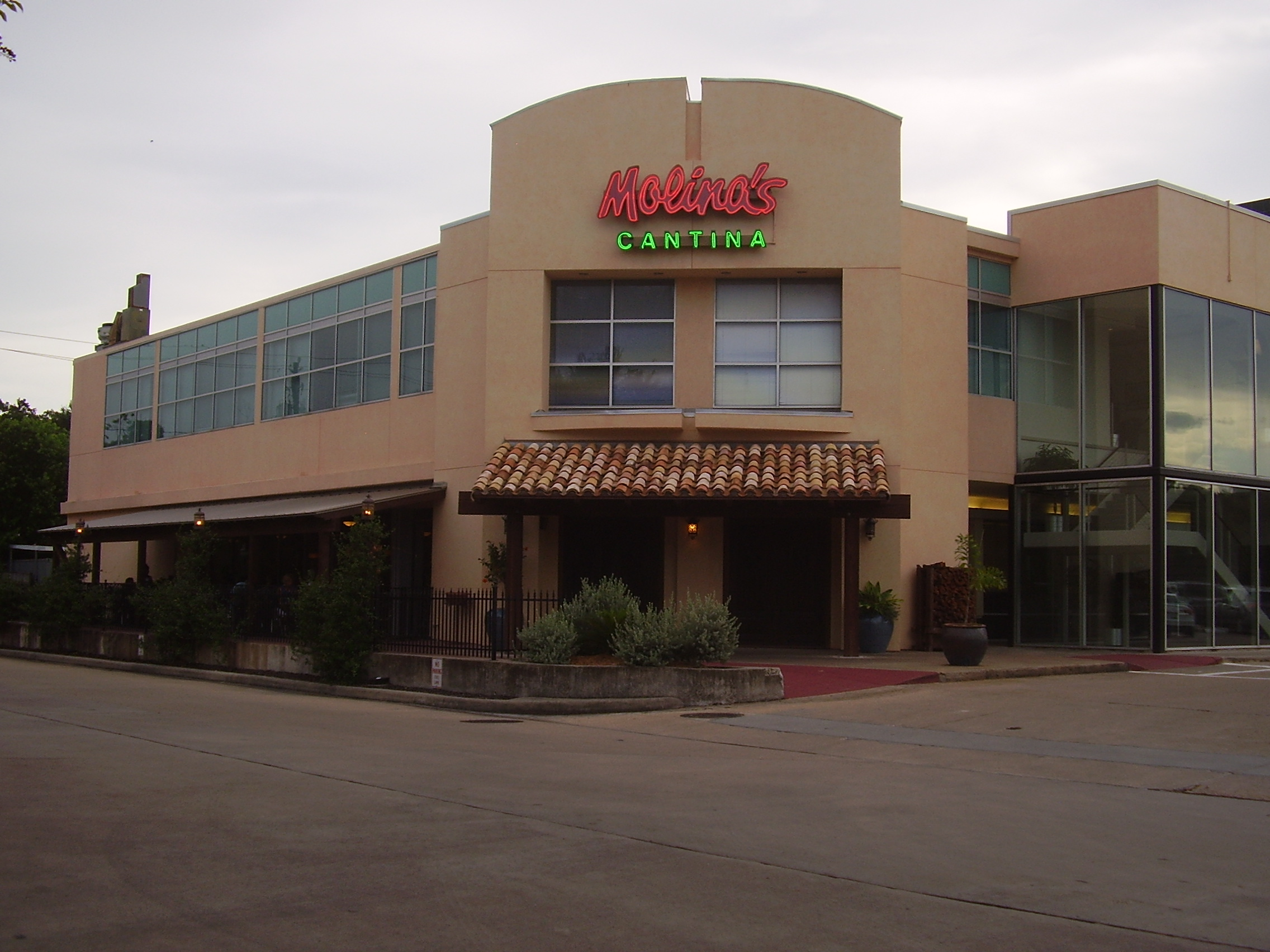
Molina's Cantina location in the Braes Heights Shopping Center in Southside Place, Greater Houston

Molina's Cantina is a Tex-Mex restaurant chain in Houston, Texas. As of 2022, Molina's is the oldest still-operating Tex-Mex restaurant in Houston.

Molina's is known for its family restaurant atmosphere and the employees who work in Molina's for many years at a time. As of 1992, one cashier had worked at Molina's for 20 years. One waiter had been working there for 45 years. One chef had recently retired after 50 years. In 2011, Molina's has had employees who had worked at the restaurant for over 20 years. The chain is also known for its famous customers, including George H. W. Bush, former President of the United States, and George Strake, former chairperson of the Republican Party of Texas.

As of 2017 the restaurant had two locations, with one on Bellaire Boulevard and one on Westheimer Road. As of 2014 the owners are third-generation; Raul III, Ricardo, and Roberto; the grandsons of the founder.

== History ==
Molina's first opened in 1941, making it, as of 2022, the oldest continually operating Tex-Mex restaurant in the city. It was established by Raul Molina, Sr., a native of Laredo, Texas. From his arrival in Houston in the late 1920s, Raul Molina, Sr. had worked as a busboy, dishwasher, and counter staff, working at the Old Monterrey Restaurant. Later he and his wife Mary had saved enough funds to open a restaurant. The family of Mary, née Sarabia, had established the newspaper La Gaceta Mexicana.

The first location, named Old Monterrey, was located at 1919 West Gray. The Molina's purchased it in 1941. The restaurant was renamed to Molina's Mexican City after moving to a new location on South Main Street in 1945, which they had also purchased. In 1955 they purchased another restaurant on Bissonnet.

In the 1970s the company began catering after receiving requests from longtime customers and American presidents, even though the owners initially had no plans to do so. Raul Molina retired in 1977, and Raul Molina, Jr. bought the restaurant operations from his father, taking all of the business's interest. In 1992 Claudia Feldman of the Houston Chronicle said "the third generation is playing an increasingly important role in the operation."

Cynthia Mayer of the Philadelphia Inquirer said that Molina's, "a restaurant that began serving Mexican food long before Corona beer and body shots became the yuppie rage," helped George H. W. Bush adjust to life as a Houstonian. Molina Jr. said that Bush often ordered enchiladas, fajitas, and/or beer.

As of 2011, During that year the restaurant celebrated its 70th anniversary by offering specials throughout the entire month of July. The crispy taco was offered for 41 cents and the enchilada dinner was offered for 70 cents, corresponding to the numerical, pre-inflation prices of 1941 (In today's money, the 1941 taco would cost $8.76 each, and the 1941 enchilada dinner would cost $16.03 each). In 2012 Katharine Shilcutt of the Houston Press said that "there's a good chance that most Houstonians have their own favorite dishes" at Molina's.

In 2017 the chain closed its location on Washington Avenue due to parking issues and rent increases.

== See also ==
- List of Tex-Mex restaurants
- Tex-Mex cuisine in Houston
- Ninfa's
- Ninfa Laurenzo
- Felix Tijerina
