= Craig Watkins =

American lawyer, district attorney (1967–2023)

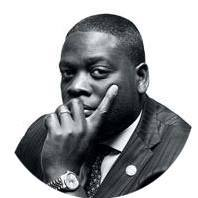

District Attorney of Dallas County, Texas
- In office 2007–2015
- Preceded by: Bill Hill
- Succeeded by: Susan Hawk

Personal details
- Born: Craig Marcus Watkins; November 16, 1967 Dallas, Texas, U.S.
- Died: December 12, 2023 (aged 56) Dallas, Texas, U.S.
- Party: Democratic
- Spouse: Tanya
- Children: 3
- Education: Prairie View A&M University (BA); Texas Wesleyan University School of Law (JD)
- Occupation: Lawyer

Craig Marcus Watkins (November 16, 1967 – December 12, 2023) was an American lawyer who was the district attorney for Dallas County, Texas from 2007 to 2015. He became the first elected African-American district attorney in Texas when he was elected in 2006.

== Education ==
Craig Marcus Watkins was born in Dallas on November 16, 1967. A 1986 graduate of David W. Carter High School of Dallas, Watkins graduated from Prairie View A&M University in 1990 with a B.A. degree in political science. In 1994, he received a J.D. degree as part of the 1994 inaugural graduating class of the Texas Wesleyan University School of Law. He was also a member of the Kappa Alpha Psi fraternity.

== Career ==
Watkins began his legal career working in the offices of the Dallas city attorney and the Dallas County Public Defender's office and later went into private practice. In 2002, Watkins ran for district attorney against incumbent Republican Bill Hill and lost. Watkins won the 2006 district attorney election over prosecutor Toby Shook in an election cycle that saw Democrats every elected office on the ballot, including all judicial seats.

The official biography of Watkins written by his office writes that Watkins secured a 99.4% conviction rate and focused on prosecuting cases of child sexual abuse. Watkins created the first Conviction Integrity Unit in the nation resulting in 35 wrongfully convicted individuals being freed under his administration. Watkins worked to resolve cases of wrongful conviction through the use of DNA testing and the review of evidence illegally withheld from defense attorneys. On January 4, 2011, Ray Suarez interviewed Watkins live on the PBS NewsHour for the exoneration by Watkins's office of Cornelius Dupree from Dupree's armed robbery conviction. Upon leaving office, Watkins entered private practice focusing on criminal defense and personal injury in state and federal courts.

The Dallas Morning News selected Watkins as its 2008 Texan of the Year.

Watkins was a member of The National Trial Lawyers Association, The Texas Trial Lawyers Association and The Dallas Criminal Defense Lawyers Association.

Public records indicate that Watkins' annual salary as of May 2012 was $200,000.

In the 2014 election, Watkins was defeated by former Judge Susan Hawk, a Republican.

== Personal life and death ==
Watkins and his wife, Tanya, had three children. He died at his home in Dallas on December 12, 2023, at the age of 56.

== See also ==
- Dallas County District Attorney
- Dallas DNA
- craigwatkinslaw.com
- Craig Watkins The History Maker
