= Mario Gallegos Jr. =

American politician (1950–2012)

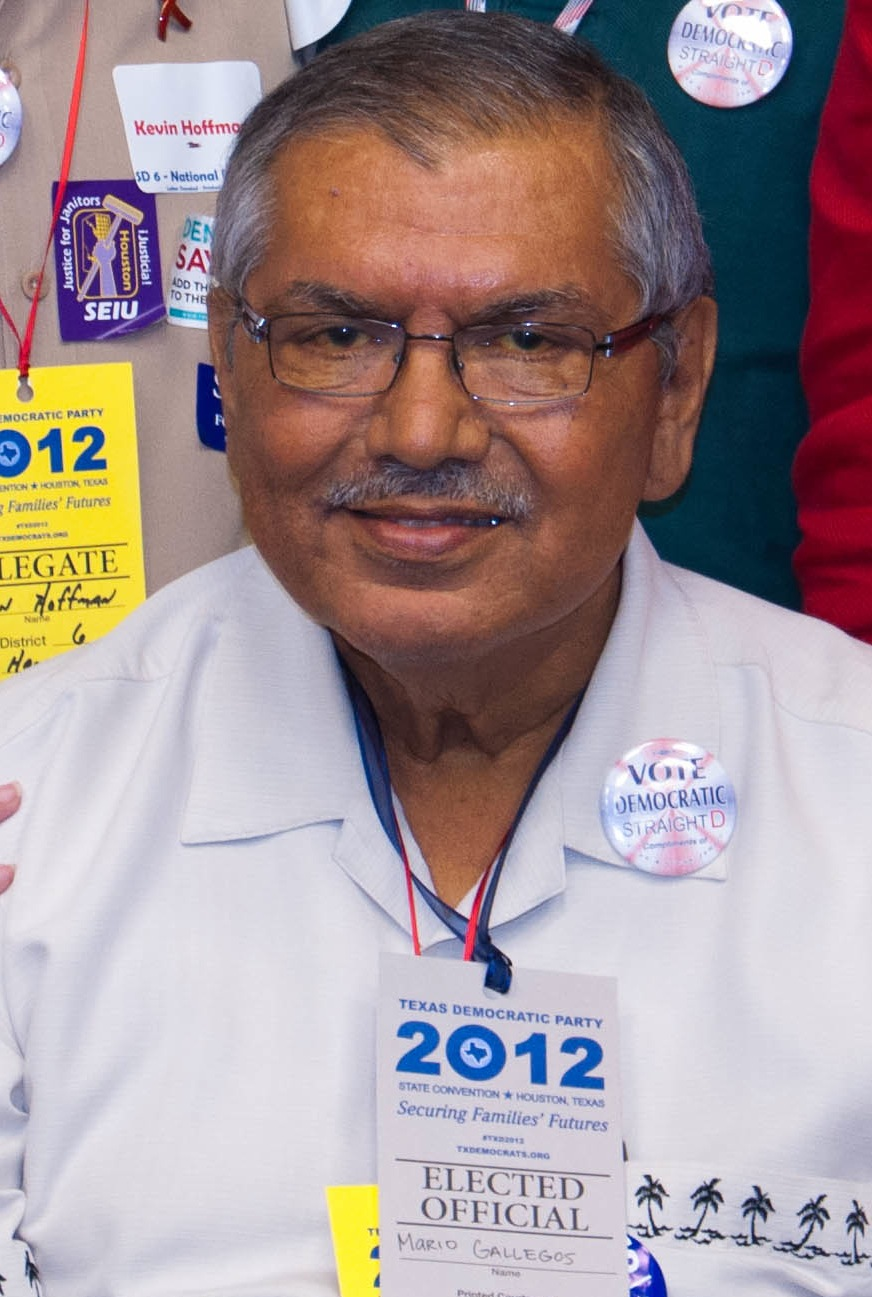
- Gallegos in 2012

Member of the Texas Senate from the 6th district
- In office January 10, 1995 – October 16, 2012
- Preceded by: Dan Shelley
- Succeeded by: Sylvia Garcia

Member of the Texas House of Representatives from the 143rd district
- In office January 8, 1991 – January 10, 1995
- Preceded by: Albert Luna, III
- Succeeded by: Gerard Torres

Personal details
- Born: Mario Valentin Gallegos Jr. September 8, 1950
- Died: October 16, 2012 (aged 62) Houston, Texas, U.S.
- Resting place: Forest Park Lawndale Cemetery; Houston, Texas
- Party: Democratic
- Education: University of Houston–Downtown (BA)
- Profession: Firefighter

Mario Valentin Gallegos Jr. (September 8, 1950 – October 16, 2012) was an American Democratic politician in the U.S. state of Texas. He was the senator from District 6 in the Texas Senate, which serves a portion of Harris County.

== Political career ==
Gallegos, who originated from the Magnolia Park community of Houston, was a long-time firefighter with the Houston Fire Department and retired as a Senior Captain after 22 years of service. In 1990, he was elected to the 72nd Legislature in the Texas House of Representatives from District 143, where he served two terms, from 1991 to 1995.

In 1994, Representatives Gallegos and Yolanda Navarro Flores and former Representative Roman O. Martinez squared off in the Democratic primary for a recently redrawn Senate District 6. Martinez received a plurality of the votes and faced Gallegos in a runoff. Gallegos secured the endorsement of former opponent Flores and won, and with no other candidates for the Senate seat, Gallegos became the first Mexican American elected to that body from Harris County.

Gallegos faced no opposition in 1998 and was reelected to the Senate. In July 2001, Gallegos was named one of the worst legislators in Texas by Texas Monthly magazine in their biennial feature. The authors noted that Gallegos was "a retired firefighter who threw gasoline on every combustible issue," and noted his penchant for injecting race into seemingly innocuous legislation.

Gallegos was unopposed in 2002. However, in 2004, Gallegos was again challenged by Yolanda Navarro Flores in the Democratic primary. Amidst two separate lawsuits challenging his residency within District 6 boundaries, and revelations (and another lawsuit) regarding a 17-year affair with former stripper Susan Delgado, Gallegos won a close contest. In the 2004 general election, he faced Libertarian challenger Tony Deppenschmidt along with a write-in challenge from his former mistress, Delgado. Gallegos won handily with over 90% of the votes.

In July 2005, Gallegos was again named one of the worst legislators in Texas by Texas Monthly. Nevertheless, Gallegos was sworn in as Governor for one day on May 5, 2007, in a Texas tradition honoring the Senate President Pro Tem.

== Personal life ==
Gallegos attended the University of Houston–Downtown (UHD) where he received a Bachelor of Arts degree in social sciences in 2001.

On March 10, 2006, Gallegos released a statement acknowledging that he was in a one-month residential treatment program for his alcoholism. On January 11, 2007, Gallegos announced that he was suffering from cirrhosis of the liver, and would require a liver transplant, and on January 19, 2007, Gallegos received a liver transplant at the Texas Medical Center in Houston. His liver donor was 16-year-old Robby Joe Trevino Jr. of Fort Worth, Texas who died unexpectedly from cardiomyopathy. According to a statement from Gallegos prior to the surgery, he would miss about 18 days of the regular session of the 80th Legislature.

Gallegos installed a hospital bed in the office of the sergeant-at-arms at the capitol building so that he could be nearby to prevent discussion of a bill requiring voter identification, against doctors' orders.

In October 2012 Gallegos was hospitalized and later died.

== Electoral history ==
=== 2004 ===
Texas general election, 2004: Senate District 6
Party	Candidate	Votes	%	±%
Democratic	Mario V. Gallegos Jr.	75,318	91.74	−8.24
Libertarian	Tony Deppenschmidt	6,614	8.05	+8.05
Write-In	Susan Delgado	160	0.19	+0.19
Majority		68,704	83.69	−16.31
Turnout		82,092		+51.65
Democratic hold				

Democratic primary, 2004: Senate District 6
Candidate		Votes	%	±
✓	Mario V. Gallegos Jr.	6,484	53.92	
	Yolanda Navarro Flores	5,541	46.07	
Turnout		12,025		

=== 2002 ===
Texas general election, 2002: Senate District 6
Party	Candidate	Votes	%	±%
Democratic	Mario V. Gallegos Jr.	54,130	100.00	0.00
Majority		54,130	100.00	+43.41
Turnout		54,130		+43.41
Democratic hold				

=== 1998 ===
Texas general election, 1998: Senate District 6
Party	Candidate	Votes	%	±%
Democratic	Mario V. Gallegos Jr.	37,746	100.00	0.00
Majority		37,746	100.00	−2.59
Turnout		37,746		−2.59
Democratic hold				

=== 1994 ===
Texas general election, 1994: Senate District 6
Party	Candidate	Votes	%	±%
Democratic	Mario V. Gallegos Jr.	38,749	100.00	+57.52
Majority		38,749	100.00	+69.20
Turnout		38,749		−74.55
Democratic gain from Republican				

Democratic primary runoff, 1994: Senate District 6
Candidate		Votes	%	±
✓	Mario V. Gallegos Jr.	9,613	57.19	
	Roman O. Martinez	7,193	42.80	
Turnout		16,806		

Democratic primary, 1994: Senate District 6
Candidate		Votes	%	±
✓	Roman O. Martinez	9,026	37.91	
✓	Mario V. Gallegos Jr.	5,990	25.15	
	Yolanda Navarro Flores	4,936	20.73	
	David Thomas McCullough	3,857	16.19	
Turnout		23,809		

=== 1992 ===
Texas general election, 1992: House District 143
Party	Candidate	Votes	%	±%
Democratic	Mario V. Gallegos Jr.	15,939	100.00	
Majority		15,939	100.00	
Turnout		15,939		
Democratic hold				

Democratic primary, 1992: House District 143
Candidate		Votes	%	±
✓	Mario V. Gallegos Jr.	4,732	59.75	
	Don Jones	1,874	23.66	
	R.J. 'Reggie' Gonzales	1,313	16.58	
Turnout		7,919		

== See also ==
- History of the Mexican-Americans in Houston
- Ninfa Laurenzo
- Rick Noriega
- Ben Reyes
- South Park Mexican
- Felix Tijerina

Texas House of Representatives
Preceded by Albert Luna, III	Member of the Texas House of Representatives from District 143 (Houston); 1991–1995	Succeeded by Gerard Torres
Texas Senate
Preceded by Dan Shelley	Texas State Senator from District 6 (Houston)^{(1)} 1995–2012	Succeeded by Sylvia Garcia
Preceded by Royce West	President pro tempore of the Texas Senate; January 9, 2007– October 13, 2012	Succeeded by Leticia Van de Putte
Notes and references
1. For the 74th through the 77th, Gallegos' home city was Galena Park
