= Tex-Mex cuisine in Houston =

Tex-Mex cuisine is very popular in Houston. Many Mexican cuisine restaurants in Houston have aspects that originate from Texas culture. Katharine Shilcutt of the Houston Press said in 2012 that "Tex-Mex has been a vital part of our city for more than 100 years" and that it "never waned in that century." She added that "[t]he cultural significance of Tex-Mex as a vital touchstone between generations and an expression of our roots cannot be denied."

In his book Ethnicity in the Sunbelt: A History of Mexican Americans in Houston, Arnoldo De León said that the recent immigrants from Mexico to Houston add foods that are popular with immigrants to menus of Mexican restaurants in Houston. Robb Walsh of the Houston Press said "You might say that the immigrant flow is what keeps the "Mex" in Tex-Mex." In Houston, as in other places in Texas, the existing Chicano community influences the cooking methods used by recent immigrants.

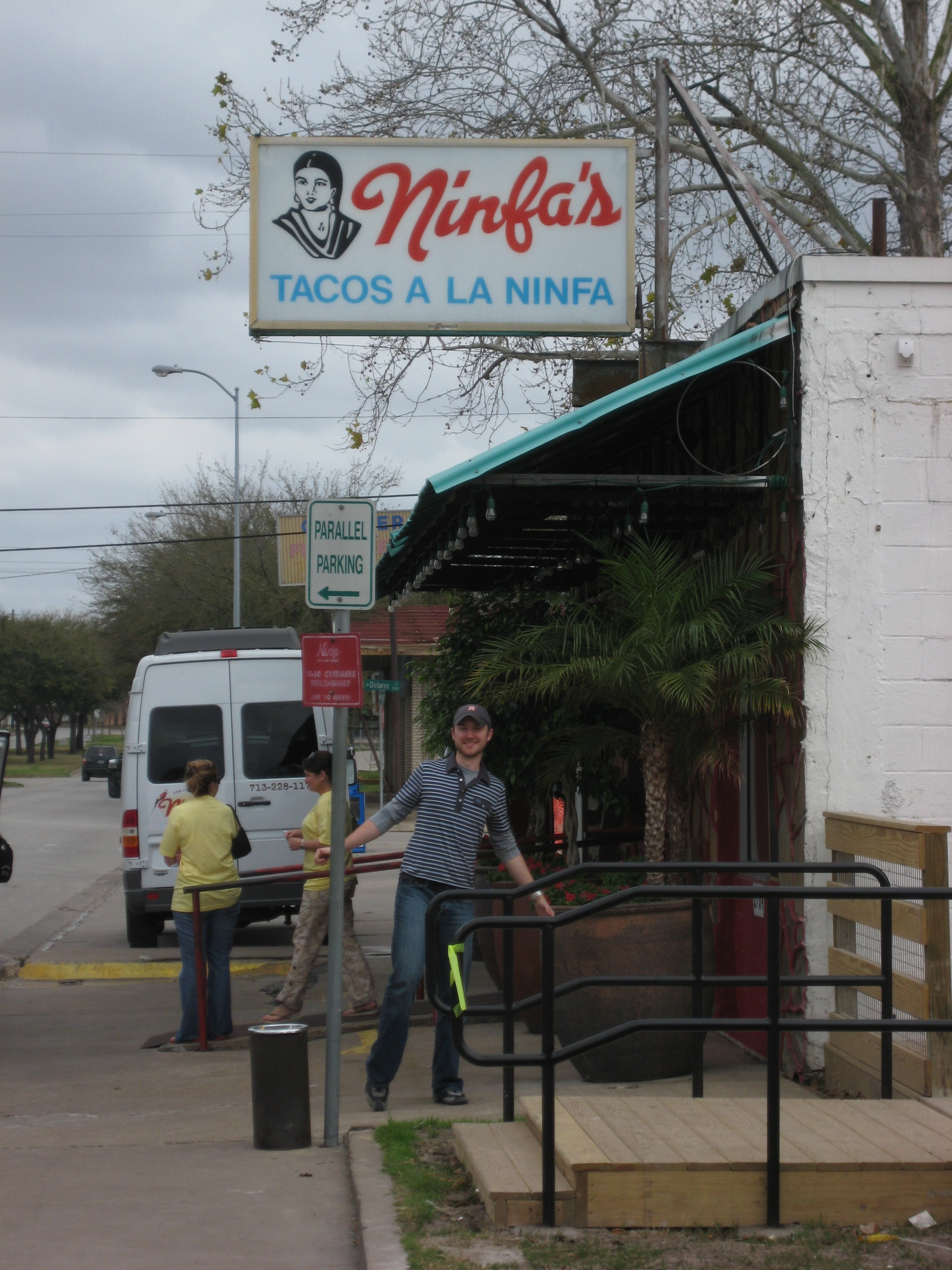
Ninfa's, a new style Tex-Mex restaurant

In Houston, several restaurants that have authentic Mexican cuisine call themselves "Mex-Mex." Several restaurants that have both Tex Mex and Mexican cuisine call themselves "Mix Mex." As of 2012, Molina's Cantina is the oldest still-operating Tex-Mex restaurant in Houston. A restaurant featuring newer style Tex-Mex, Ninfa's, became influential in the development of the cuisine in the city.

== History ==
Tex-Mex cuisine in Houston began in the late 1800s, when street vendors appeared. Most were Hispanic, black and Native American. In 1901 Tex-Mex food vendors began moving to indoor venues after the city government prohibited open-air food vending at Market Square. In 1907 a food safety campaign began, and the resulting laws lead to many street vendors going out of business. This campaign began targeting tamale vendors in 1909 when City Health Officer Dr. George W. Larendon became alarmed by rising food poisoning cases. Even though Dr. Larendon admitted no cases could be traced to tamaleros, he portrayed them as a health danger. By 1910, while some food vendors remained in business, restaurants began to replace the food vendors.

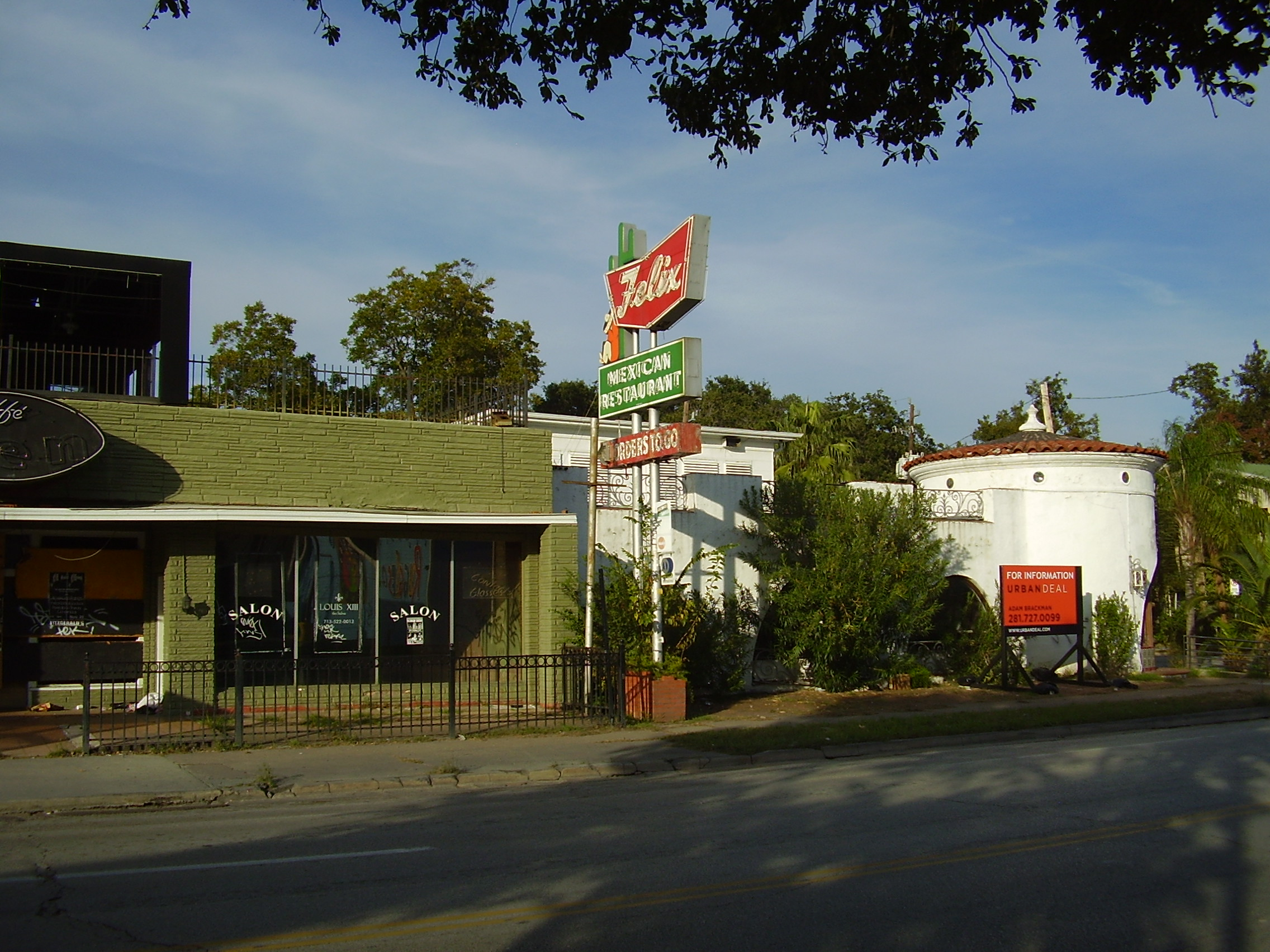
Felix Mexican Restaurant was a popular older style of Tex-Mex restaurant

The first Tex Mex restaurant in Houston was Original Mexican Restaurant; George Caldwell, a non-Hispanic, White (Anglo) American from San Antonio, Texas, opened it in 1907. Robb Walsh said that "Caldwell was no doubt inspired by the Original Mexican Restaurant in his hometown, which opened in 1900." In 1929 Felix Tijerina, who worked as a busboy in Caldwell's restaurant, opened Felix's. While the business failed due to the Great Depression, Tijerina re-established it in 1937. Early Tex Mex restaurants catered to Anglo palates. They were the first places where Anglo and Mexican Americans interacted with one another. Molina's Cantina first opened in 1941, making it, as of 2011, the oldest continually operating Tex-Mex restaurant in the city. Cynthia Mayer of the Philadelphia Inquirer said that Molina's, "a restaurant that began serving Mexican food long before Corona beer and body shots became the yuppie rage," helped George H. W. Bush adjust to life as a Houstonian.

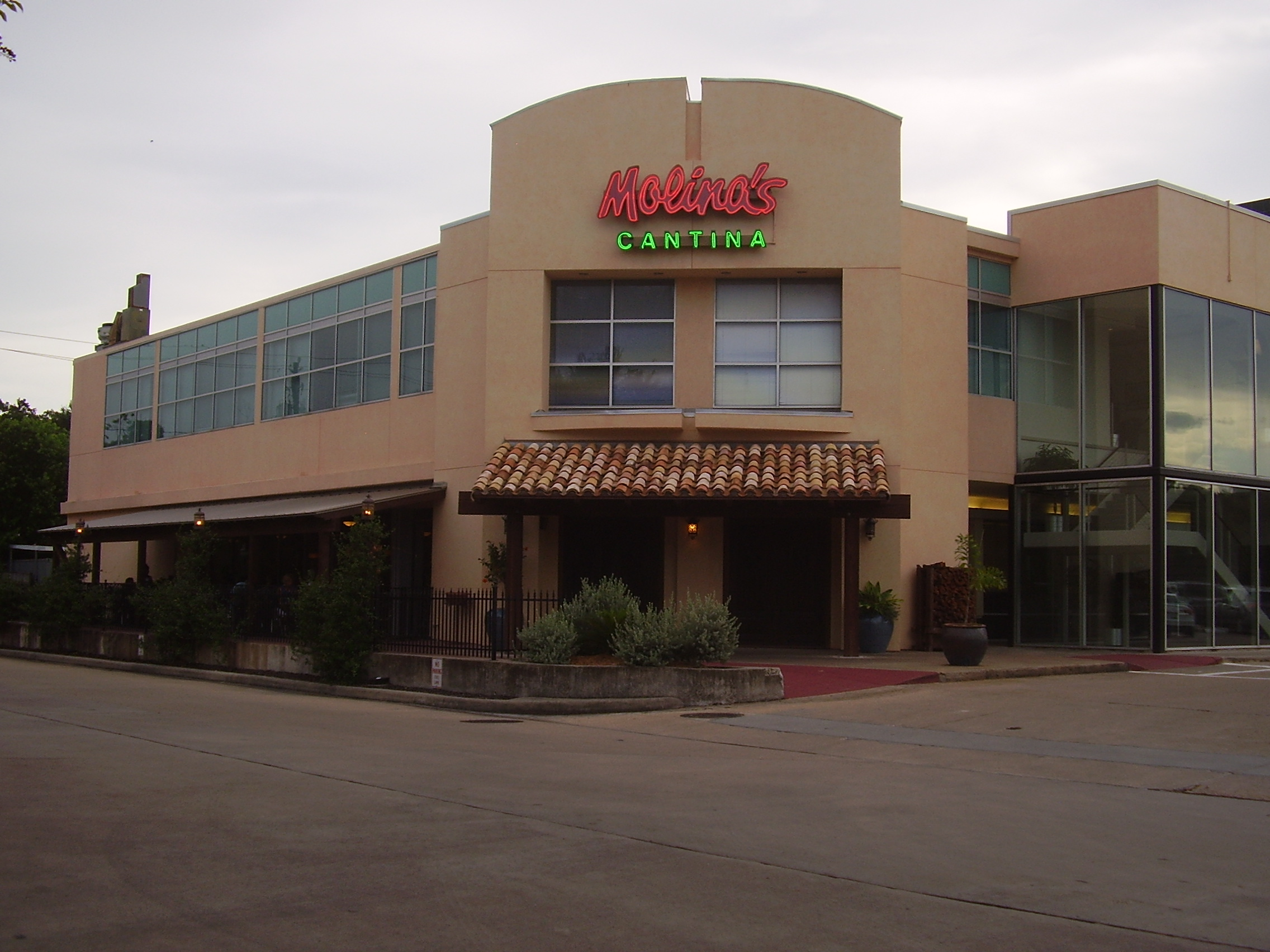
Molina's Cantina in Southside Place

In 1972 Diana Kennedy released the book The Cuisines of Mexico, which detailed food across Mexico from different socioeconomic and ethnic groups. Beginning in 1973, newer style Tex-Mex restaurants, influenced by Kennedy and other people who advocated for actual Mexican cuisine, opened. The food included tended to have grilled meats, salsas, and seafood. Walsh said that while "[t]heir slogans promised authenticity", "the new Mexican restaurants weren't much more authentic than the ones they replaced." Ninfa's began serving fajitas in 1973, and other restaurants followed suit. Many of the foods originated from Tejano people from West Texas and the Rio Grande Valley, and not from central Mexico.

Many older style Mexican restaurants declined and/or went out of business. Some old-style restaurants were frequented by older people who have a nostalgia for older cooking. Some old-style restaurants cater to families with young children who may dislike the bolder flavors in newer Houston Tex-Mex.

In 1977 Richard West of the Texas Monthly stated that Houston, the largest city in Texas, has "the highest percentage of demanding food seekers" and therefore "it's not too surprising that here one finds the widest spectrum of Mexican cuisine."

Walsh said "From the "genuine Mexican food" of George Caldwell in 1907 to the claims you hear today, Mexican restaurants have always promised authenticity and have always delivered what sells. The real changes that have taken place are in the public's tastes. And understanding the way our tastes have changed can tell us a lot about where we're going and where we've been."

== Gallery ==
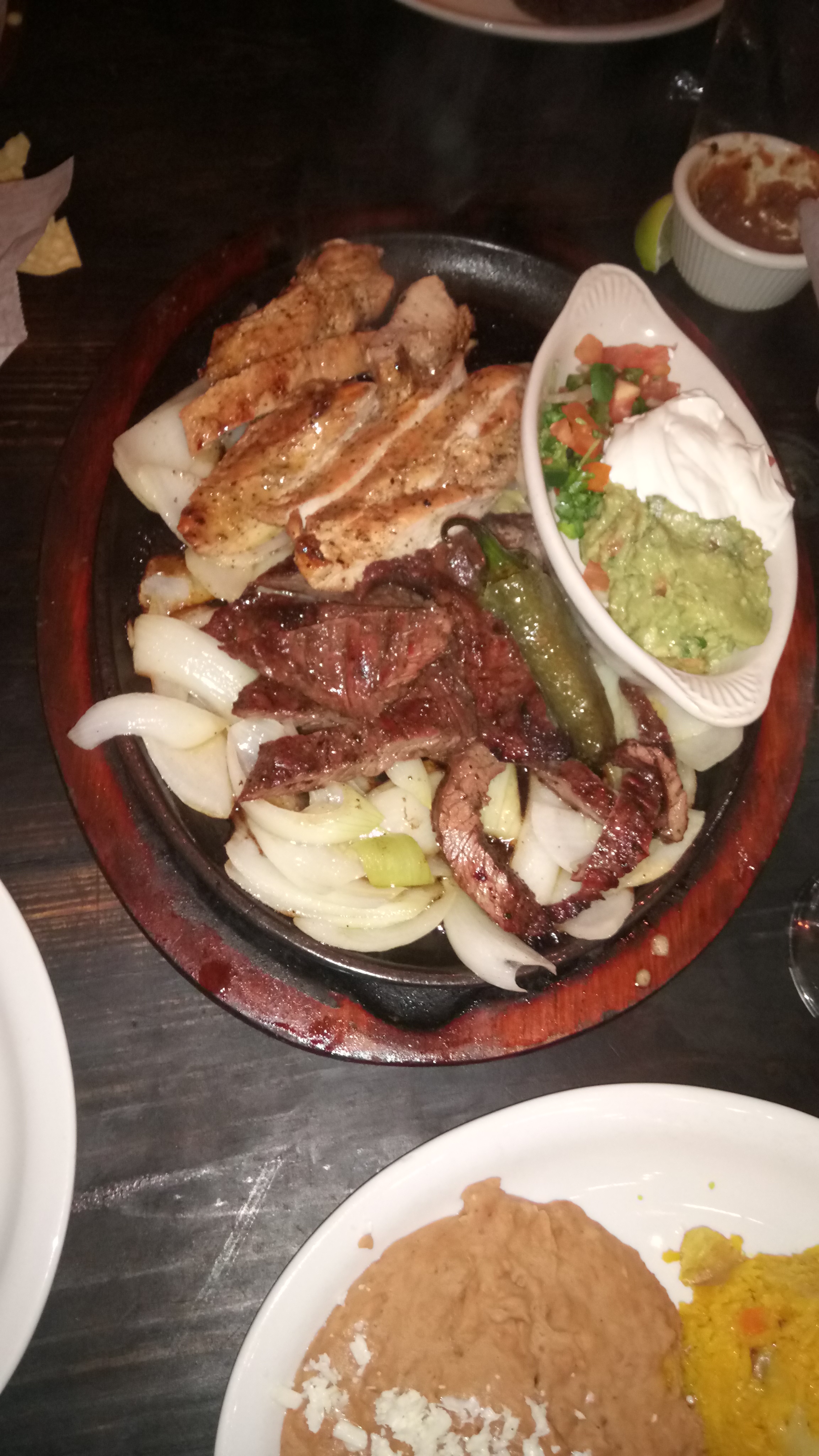
Original Ninfa's tacos al carbón/fajitas

== See also ==
- Cuisine of Houston
- Ninfa Laurenzo
- Felix Tijerina
- Molina's Cantina
- Ninfa's
- Culture of Houston
- Maggie Rita's
