= Jim Goode =

American businessperson

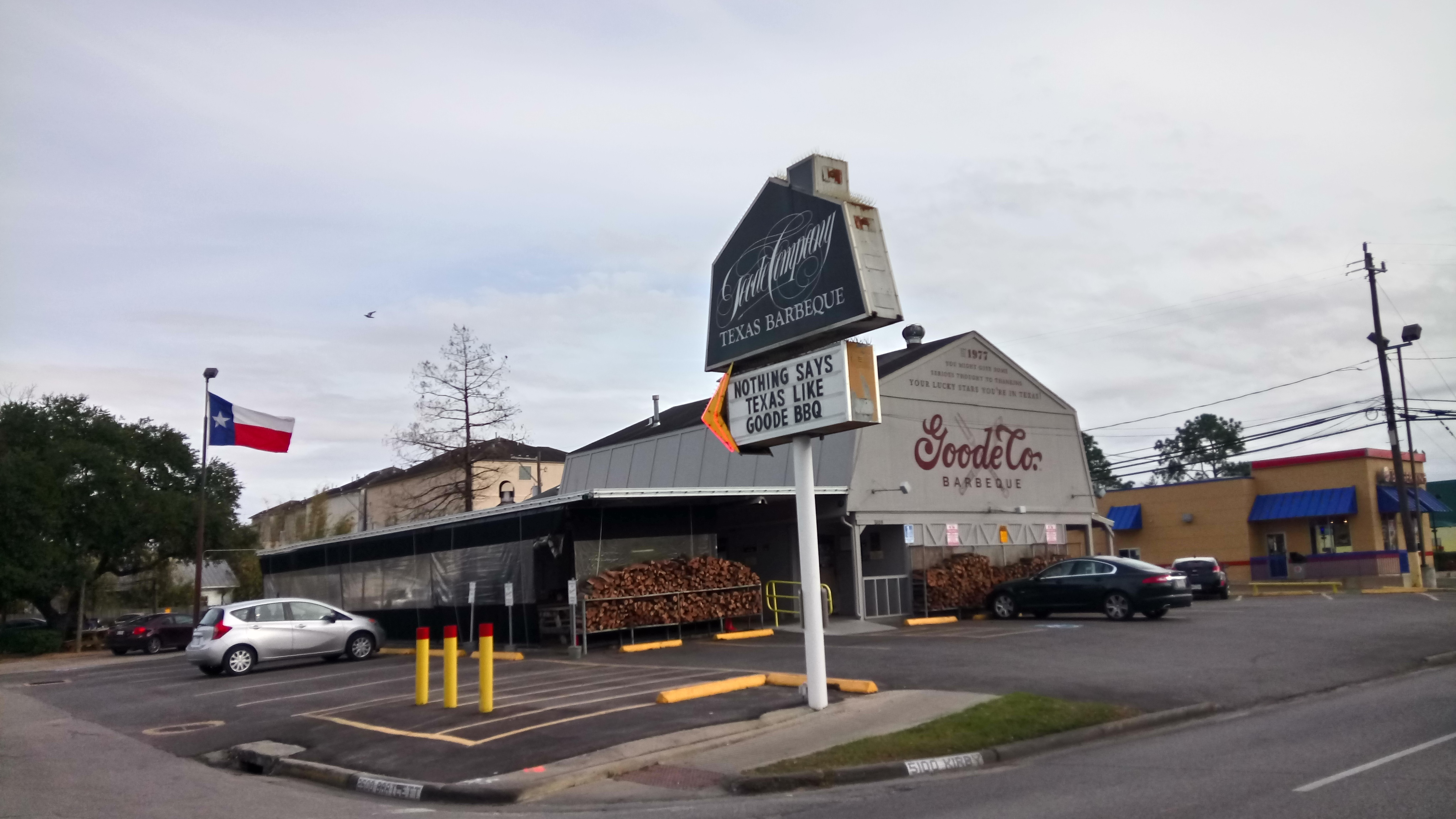
Goode Company Barbecue

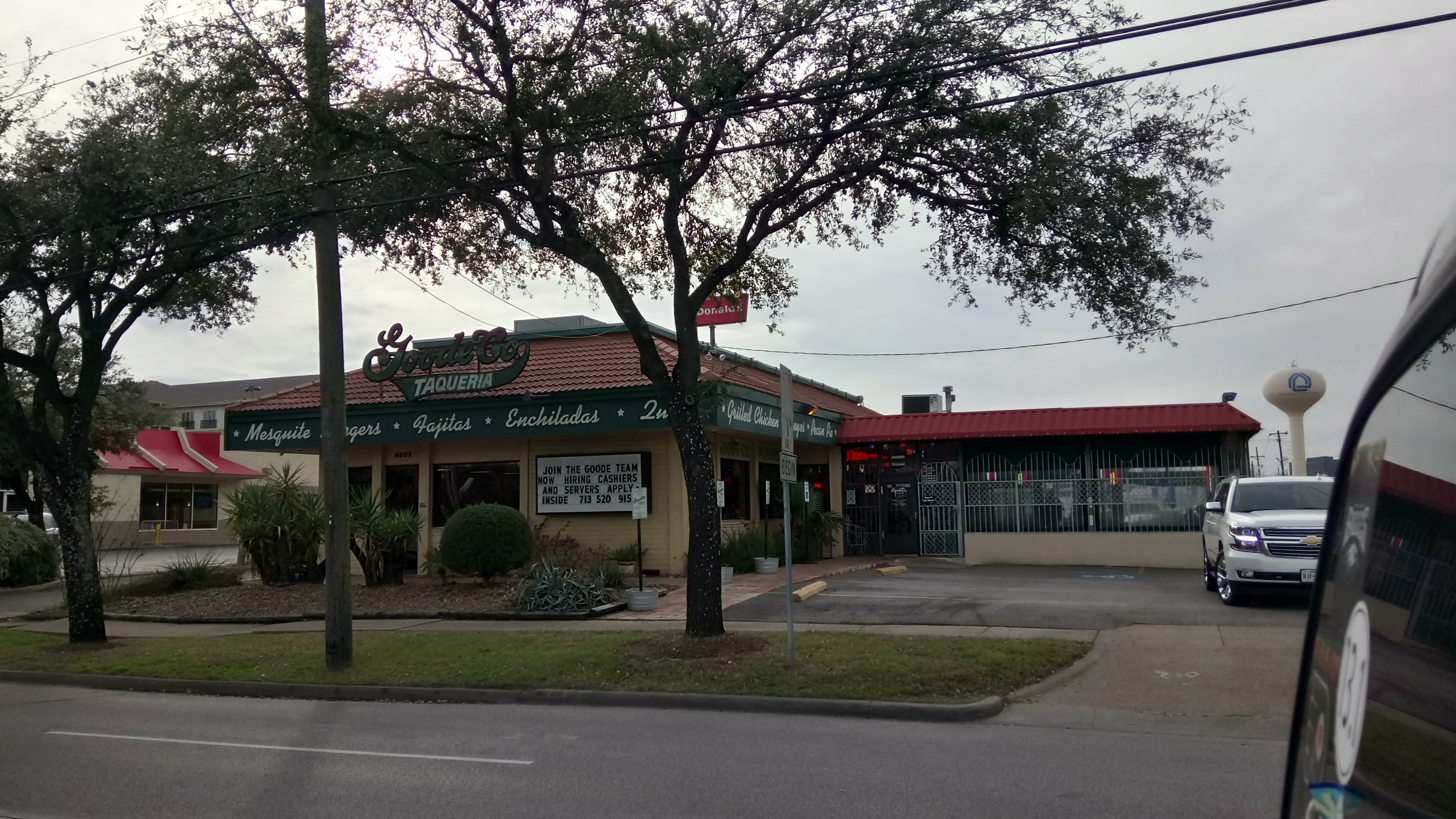
Goode Company Taqueria

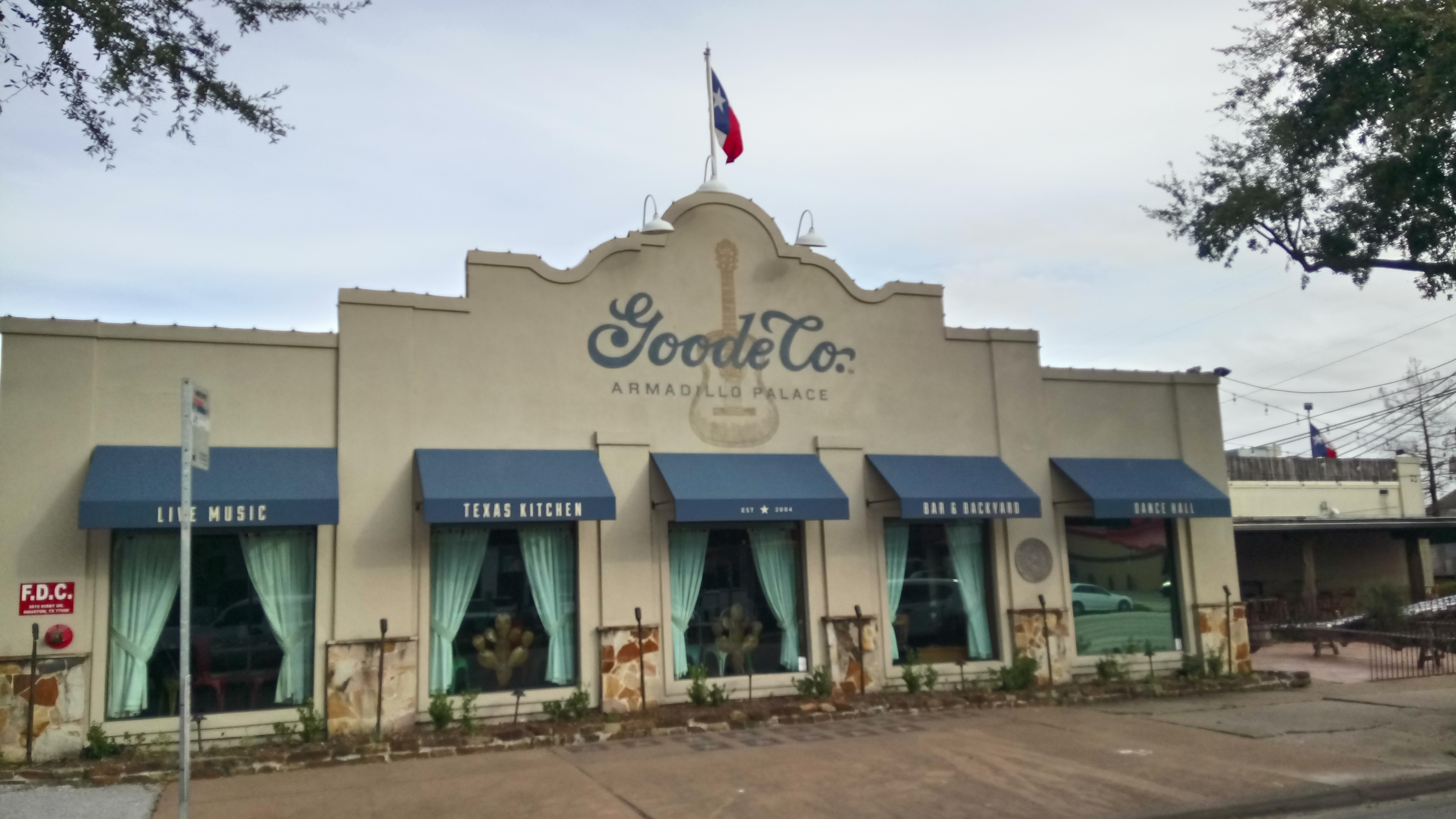
Goode Company Armadillo Place

James Douglas Goode (April 15, 1944 – February 2, 2016) was an American businessperson who was the owner of the Goode Company restaurant group in Houston, Texas.

As of 2012 there are four different restaurant styles and a total of seven locations. His restaurant group includes Goode Company Barbecue; Goode Company Taqueria, which serves Mexican food and hamburgers; Goode Company Seafood, a sit-down seafood restaurant; and a southern, ranch style restaurant with live music called The Armadillo Palace. Four restaurants are located together on Kirby Drive.

Author Robb Walsh described Goode as "an all-around expert on Texas cookery" who operated "one of the top barbecue pits in Texas". In 2012 Greg Morago of the Houston Chronicle wrote that the family name Goode "is synonymous with Texas food and Bayou City hospitality."

== Early life ==
Goode was born and raised in Velasco, Texas. A fourth-generation Texan who was about 75% Mexican origin, his parents were previously residents of Tampico, Mexico. His father, born in Yoakum, Texas, had married a Mexican woman from Tampico. Goode's grandfather, who also married a Mexican woman in Tampico, had worked for U.S. oil companies; the family of his father originally settled Texas in the 1950s, moving to Cuero. His great-grandfather had fought in the U.S. Civil War.

Goode enlisted in the Navy and was stationed in Okinawa during the Vietnam War. After his military service he enrolled at the Milton Glaser School of Visual Arts. He worked as a freelance commercial artist before buying the Red Barn Barbecue, a barbecue restaurant located in a barn-shaped structure, in 1977. The previous owner did not want the restaurant anymore. She was a part of a husband and wife team, but after her husband died she wanted to return to her family in East Texas. She was not passionate about operating the restaurant while her husband had been.

Goode acquired it for $6,000. $3,000 of the money used to buy the restaurant came from his savings, and another $3,000 was a scheduled payment for a job designing the logo of a department store. Goode had no prior experience in managing a restaurant.

Goode had competed in chuck wagon cook-offs, and he was a known backyard barbecuer before he began his restaurant career.

== Restaurant career ==
Goode, his wife Liz, and his uncle Joe Dixie were the partners of the first restaurant, Goode Company Barbecue, which opened on Tuesday September 6, 1977, the first Tuesday after Labor Day. Joe Dixie had served in the U.S. military in World War II and worked as a cook while he was held as a prisoner of war. According to Goode, his restaurant was one of the first to use the mesquite grilling technique. Goode and his uncle manned the barbecue pit, and Goode personally designed the logo. Goode's son, Levi Goode, stated that initially his father and uncle "practically lived" at the restaurant and that it was a "24/7 job".

The taqueria and hamburger restaurant opened in 1983 in a plot of land across the street from the barbecue barn; Goode had purchased the plot in 1982. The seafood restaurant opened by 1986. His wife Liz divorced in the 1980s and exited the business. Armadillo's opened in 2005. Goode had his central commissary established on Westpark Avenue.

== Personal life, death, and legacy ==
He served as a director of the Houston Livestock Show & Rodeo and served as a member in the Tejas Vaqueros-No Nombres Camp and the Coastal Conservation Association.

He died from alzheimer's at age 71. His visitation was held at Geo. H. Lewis & Sons Funeral Directors on February 10, 2016, and his funeral was held at Jasek Chapel of Geo. H. Lewis & Sons on February 11, 2016.

As of 2012 his son Levi Goode operates the Goode Company business.

Mayor of Houston Annise Parker declared October 7 "Jim Goode Day".

== See also ==
- History of the Mexican-Americans in Houston
- Tex-Mex cuisine in Houston
