= Ben Reyes =

American politician (1947–2026)

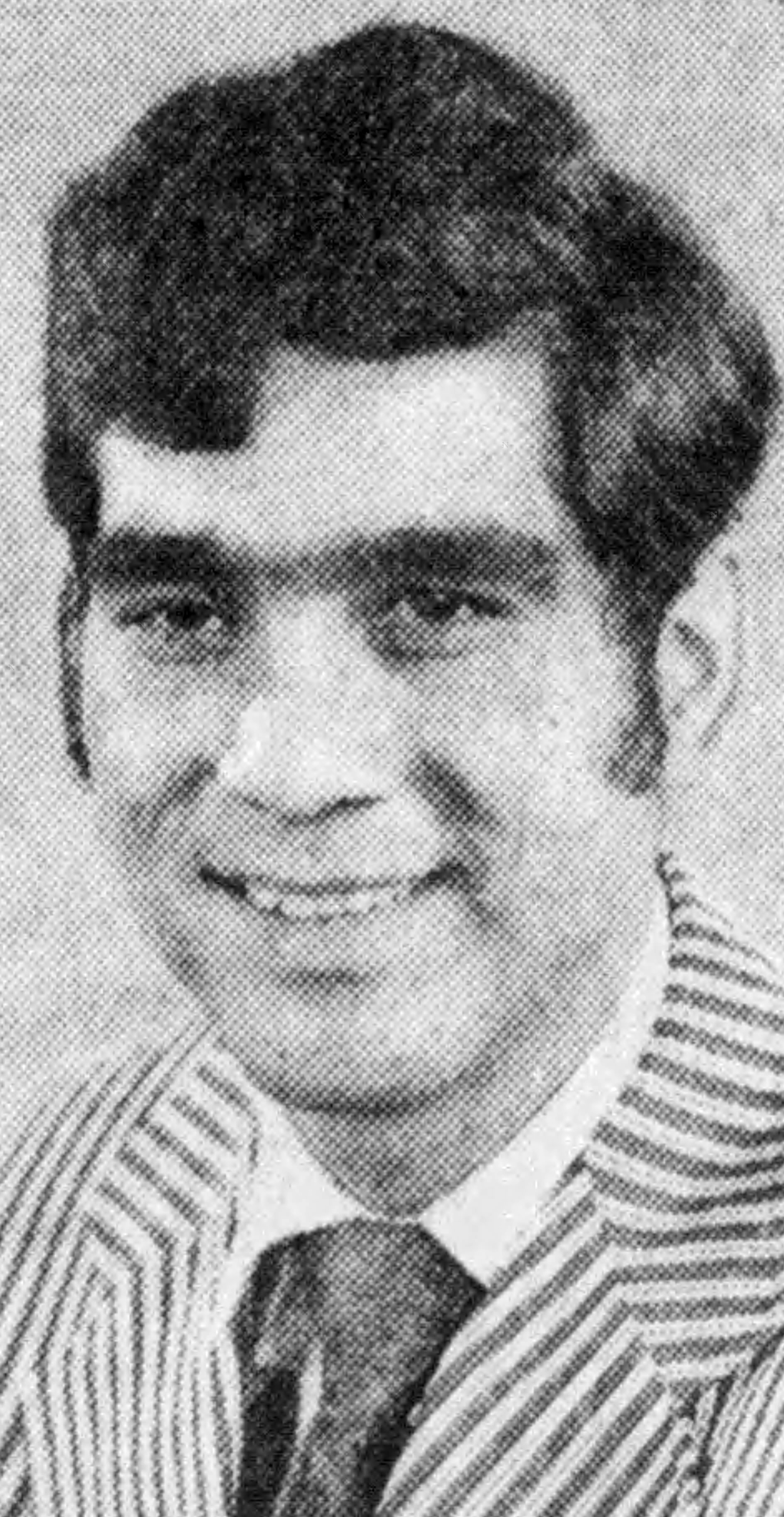
- Reyes c. 1972

Member of the Houston City Council for District I
- In office January 2, 1980 – January 2, 1996
- Preceded by: District Created
- Succeeded by: John Castillo

Member of the Texas House of Representatives from the 89th district
- In office January 9, 1973 – January 2, 1980

Personal details
- Born: February 16, 1947 Burton, Texas, U.S.
- Died: November 6, 2026 (aged 79) Houston, Texas, U.S.
- Party: Democratic (after 1972)
- Education: University of Houston
- Occupation: Politician

Military service
- Allegiance: United States
- Branch: U.S. Marine Corps
- Service years: 1966–1969
- Conflict: Vietnam War

Ben Torres Reyes (February 16, 1947 – November 6, 2026) was an American politician. He served as a member of the Texas House of Representatives and Houston City Council.

== Life and career ==
Reyes, a Mexican American, was born February 16, 1947, in Burton, Texas. A resident of the Denver Harbor area of Houston, Reyes, whose father was a laborer, was a member of a family of ten people. He served in the Marine Corps from 1966 through 1969 for a three-year span, and he served one tour of duty in the Vietnam War. He later became an activist and a politician.

In 1970, Reyes was a candidate for the Harris County Democratic Executive Committee. In 1972, the Raza Unida Party asked Reyes to run for the State House under their ticket, but he ran instead as a Democrat and was elected. Representing District 89, he won re-election three times, receiving over 96% of the vote in 1976. While in the house he served as the vice chairman of the Liquor Regulation Committee and as the chairperson of the Rules committee. Reyes served in the Texas House of Representatives from 1973 to 1979. In 1977 he attended both Texas Southern University and the University of Houston.

In 1979 he was elected to the Houston City Council. He served in District I for 16 years; he left due to term limits. As a city council member he arranged the demolitions of various houses that housed criminal activities. His final year of service was 1995. In 1999 Tim Fleck of the Houston Press said that he "virtually created Hispanic politics in Houston and held his own on City Council as perhaps the best wheeler-dealer for nearly two decades."

In a 1991 Houston Chronicle article, Richard Murray, a political scientist from the University of Houston, said "Ben was not only a young Turk, but he was an angry Turk. But Ben has had a 20-year career and, like many people, he is a different person now than when he was first elected."

In 1992 he ran for United States Congress in the newly created 29th District, a 63 percent Hispanic-majority district located in eastern Houston. He was initially the favorite, but only won 34 percent of the vote in the five-way Democratic primary—the real contest in this heavily Democratic district. He was forced into a runoff with State Senator Gene Green (with whom he had served in the Texas House), which he lost by only 180 votes out of 31,508 cast. He again challenged Green in the 1994 primary, losing by over 3000.

A Federal Bureau of Investigation sting revealed issues with Reyes. In May 1991 a grand jury from Harris County indicted Reyes with felony charges, including illegally accepting corporate campaign contributions (taking $51,000 United States dollars to influence votes for a project for a convention center hotel), not using the proper authority while ordering demolition of structures accused of being "crack houses," and stealing a magnolia tree.

In October 1995 undercover Federal Bureau of Investigation (FBI) agents gave Reyes a briefcase with cash in exchange for his engineering of votes so that a city contract would be awarded for a convention center hotel. In 1996 he was placed into custody, accused of committing bribery and conspiracy. He was convicted on December 14, 1998, and he went to federal prison for a nine-year term in March 1999. Reyes entered the Federal Bureau of Prisons (BOP) system. He was originally incarcerated within the Federal Correctional Complex, Beaumont. He requested a transfer to Federal Correctional Institution, Jesup and was granted his transfer. Reyes said that FCI Jesup was "a more relaxed, more bucolic facility" than the Beaumont facility was. While in the minimum security Georgia prison, Reyes worked as a janitor. Reyes, along with other inmates, submitted a petition to outgoing President of the United States Bill Clinton asking for a pardon. In June 2006 he was released to an East End halfway house. In December 2006 he was released from the halfway house and put on probation. While in the BOP system Reyes had the register number 76205–079. December 29, 2006 was his ultimate release date from correctional supervision.

A woman Reyes described as a "significant other" picked up Reyes from the halfway house. The probation terms stated that Reyes cannot campaign, run for office, or serve on any boards. He was released from probation in December 2009. Reyes lived in Spring Branch with his wife, Rosalie Brockman; she was his longtime girlfriend before they married in 2008. As of 2009 Reyes worked as a construction supervisor.

Reyes died on November 6, 2026, at the age of 79.

== Legacy ==
The Houston Public Library maintains the Ben T. Reyes Collection at the Houston Metropolitan Research Center. The collection has material spanning from 1970 through 1988. All of the material from the beginning of box one through folder twelve of box eight has material regarding his service in the Texas House of Representatives. The rest of the collection concerns his Houston City Council service.

In 1999 Tim Fleck of the Houston Press ranked Reyes as the "Best and Worst Councilman at the Same Time." Fleck explained that while Reyes had been convicted of corrupt acts, he had also made political contributions to the city. Fleck added that Reyes, who falsely said that he received the Purple Heart, "had the worst midlife crisis in Houston political history." Fleck said "When Ben was good, he was very good, but when he was bad, he stank out the house."

== See also ==
- History of the Mexican-Americans in Houston
- Jew Don Boney, Jr.
- Clarence Bradford
- Ellen Cohen
- Mario Gallegos, Jr.
- Ninfa Laurenzo
- Melissa Noriega
- Annise Parker
