= Dallas County District Attorney =

Elected district attorney (DA) of Dallas County, Texas

The Dallas County District Attorney is the elected, or appointed by the Texas Governor in the event of a vacancy, district attorney (DA) of Dallas County, Texas. Currently, this position is held by John Creuzot, a Democrat who defeated Faith Johnson, appointed by Texas Governor Greg Abbott, after Susan Hawk resigned in 2014. The office prosecutes offenses under Texas state law classified as felonies, Class A and B misdemeanors, appeals of Class C misdemeanors (punishable by fine only), and Class C misdemeanors filed in the Justice of the Peace courts, generally by non-municipal police agencies. (Federal law violations are prosecuted by the U.S. Attorney for the United States District Court for the Northern District of Texas).

== List of DAs ==
- John Creuzot, Democrat, 2019–present
- Faith Johnson, Republican, 2016–2018
- Susan Hawk, Republican, 2015–2016 (resigned on September 6, 2016)
- Craig Watkins, Democrat, 2007–2015
- Bill Hill, Republican, 1999–2007
- John Vance, Republican, (first elected in 1986) January 1987–1999
- Henry Wade, Democrat, 1951–1987

== See also ==
- Allegheny County District Attorney
- Baltimore County State's Attorney
- Dallas DNA
- Denver District Attorney's Office
- District Attorney of Philadelphia
- King County Prosecuting Attorney
- Los Angeles County District Attorney
- Milwaukee County District Attorney
- New York County District Attorney
- San Diego County District Attorney
- San Francisco District Attorney's Office
