= Baltimore County State's Attorney =

District attorney's office position in Maryland

State's Attorney of Baltimore County, Maryland
- Incumbent; Scott D. Shellenberger since January 2, 2007
- Seat: Towson, Maryland
- Term length: 4 years
- Website: Baltimore County State's Attorney's Office page

The current Baltimore County State's Attorney is Scott D. Shellenberger. Shellenberger took office on January 2, 2007.

Shellenberger started his legal career in the Baltimore County State's Attorney's Office working as a law clerk while attending the University of Baltimore Law School. Upon being admitted to the bar in 1985, Shellenberger began working as a prosecutor.

Shellenberger slowly moved through the ranks in the State's Attorney's Office. In addition to trying cases, Shellenberger served as supervisor of the Felony Screening, Career Criminal and Automobile Manslaughter Units.

Shellenberger was born and raised in Baltimore County. He is a graduate of Loch Raven High School, Loyola College and the University of Baltimore School of Law. He resides with his wife and daughters in the same Baltimore County neighborhood where he grew up.

Shellenberger will serve a four-year term.

The office is responsible for prosecuting felony, misdemeanor and juvenile cases in Baltimore County, Maryland.

The office currently employs 58 attorneys to handle the case load in the District, Juvenile, and Circuit Courts of Baltimore County, Maryland.

In 2025, a challenger emerged to unseat long-time incumbent Scott D. Shellenberger, with deputy prosecutor Sarah David reporting campaign funds that more than doubled Shellenberger’s as of the most recent reporting period.

== See also ==
- Allegheny County District Attorney
- Dallas County District Attorney
- Denver District Attorney's Office
- District Attorney of Philadelphia
- King County Prosecuting Attorney
- Los Angeles County District Attorney
- Milwaukee County District Attorney
- New York County District Attorney
- San Diego County District Attorney
- San Francisco District Attorney's Office
