= Robb Walsh =

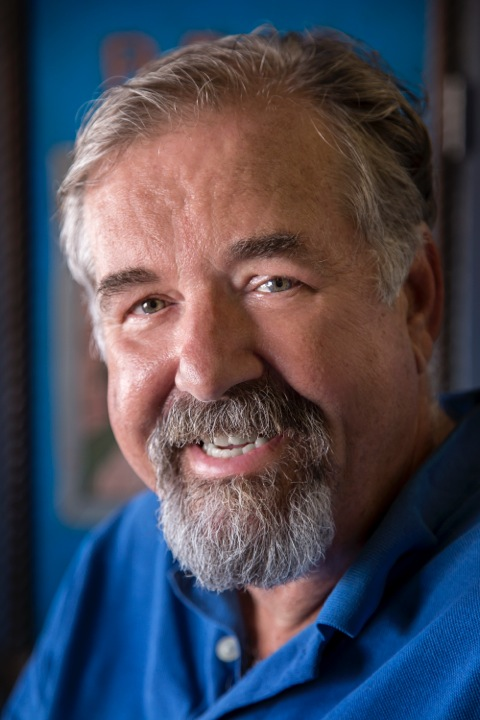
- American food writer, cookbook author and restaurant owner Robb Walsh
- Citizenship: United States
- Occupations: Author, writer, restaurateur
- Writing career
- Language: English
- Genre: Food writing

Robb Walsh is an American food writer, cookbook author, and restaurant owner who divides his time between Galway Bay, Ireland, and Galveston, Texas. He is a former commentator on National Public Radio's Weekend Edition, Sunday; former restaurant critic at the Houston Press (2000 until 2010); former editor-in-chief of Chile Pepper Magazine (1999 to 2000); former food columnist for Natural History magazine, and three-time winner of the James Beard Award. He currently writes about food for magazines such as Houstonia and Texas Highways, and websites such as First We Feast. He was a partner and co-founder of the former El Real Tex-Mex Cafe in Houston's Montrose neighborhood.

Walsh is the author of more than a dozen food books, including Legends of Texas Barbecue Cookbook (Chronicle, June 2002), which was nominated for the James Beard Award in the Americana category. His book, The Tex-Mex Cookbook (Broadway 2004), was nominated for the IACP Cookbook Award in the American Category. His book, Sex, Death & Oysters (Counterpoint Press 2009) was voted Book of the Month in January 2009 by Amazon.com. He is also the author of Texas Eats (2010) and The Hot Sauce Cookbook (2012) from Ten Speed Press and Barbecue Crossroads (2012) from the University of Texas Press. His latest book is The Chili Cookbook from Ten Speed Press, which will be released in September 2015.

Robb Walsh's writings appear in several anthologies including: Best Food Writing 2001 through 2009 and Cornbread Nation, Best Southern Food Writing volumes I, II, & IV from the Southern Foodways Alliance. He is the founder and head judge of the Austin Chronicle Hot Sauce Festival, now in its 25th year.

In July 2010, along with other veterans of the Southern Foodways Alliance, Walsh founded a non-profit organization called Foodways Texas to preserve and promote Texas food culture. Foodways Texas is headquartered in Austin and is affiliated with the University of Texas at Austin.
