= Culture of Houston =

Houston is a multicultural city with a thriving international community supported by the third largest concentration of consular offices in the United States, representing 86 nations. In addition to historical Southeast Texas culture, Houston became the fourth-most populous city in the United States. Officially, Houston is nicknamed the "Space City" as it is home to NASA's Lyndon B. Johnson Space Center, where Mission Control Center is located. "Houston" was the first word spoken on the Moon. Many locals refer to Houston as "Bayou City." Other nicknames include "H-Town", "Clutch City", and "Magnolia City".

About 145 languages are regularly spoken in the Houston area. Some neighborhoods with high populations of Vietnamese and Chinese residents have Chinese and Vietnamese street signs in addition to English ones. Houston has two Chinatowns—the original located in East Downtown and the other along Bellaire Boulevard in the southwest area of the city. The city also has a Little Saigon in Midtown and Vietnamese businesses located in the southwest Houston Chinatown.

There are many popular events held in the city celebrating cultures of Houstonians. The largest is the annual Houston Livestock Show and Rodeo that is held over 20 days from late February through early March. The event begins with trail rides that originate from several points throughout the state, all of which convene at Reliant Park for a barbecue cook-off. The rodeo includes typical rodeo events, as well as concert performances from major artists and carnival rides. Other events held annually include the Houston Greek Festival and Houston International Festival.

Anna Rohleder of Forbes said "Among Houston's wealthy denizens, social life centers on charity events and the arts."

== Arts and theatre ==
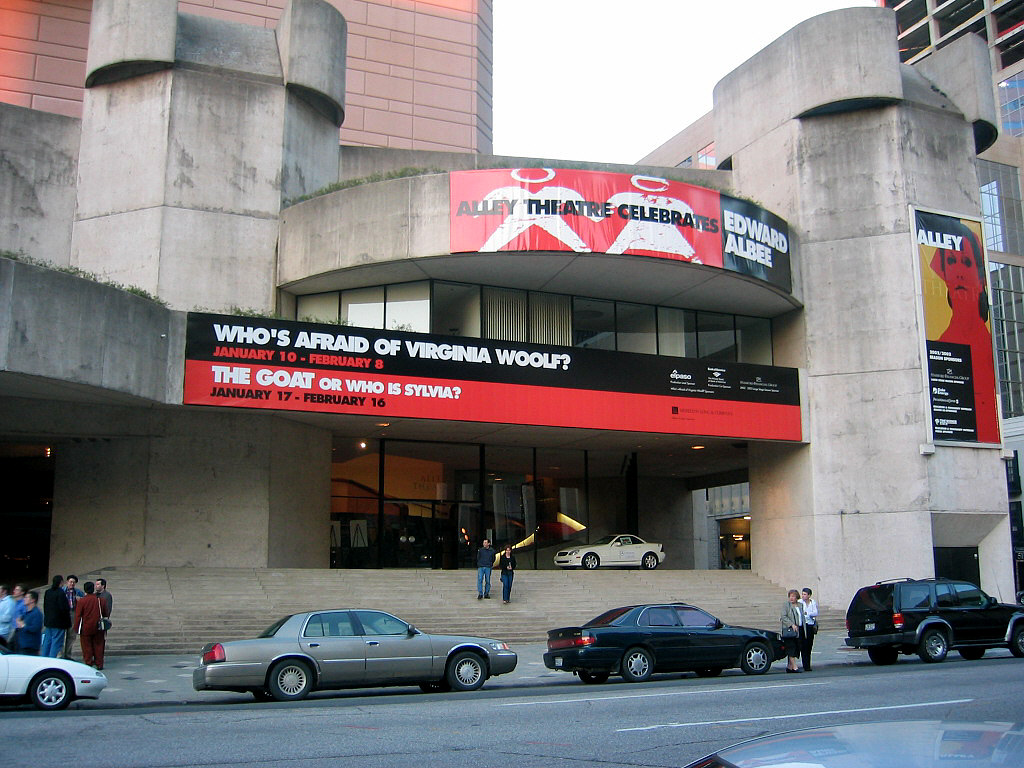
Alley Theatre

Houston's Theater District is ranked second in the country (behind New York City) in the number of theatre seats in a concentrated downtown area with 12,948 seats for live performances and 1,480 movie seats. The Theater District is located in the heart of downtown and is home to nine of Houston's performing arts organizations and six performance halls. Houston is one of only five cities in the United States with permanent professional resident companies in all of the major performing arts disciplines: opera (Houston Grand Opera), ballet (Houston Ballet), music (Houston Symphony Orchestra), and theatre (Alley Theatre). The city has visual and performing arts organizations, along with a dose of homegrown folk art such as Art Cars. The city is a stop for touring companies from Broadway, concerts, shows, and exhibitions for a variety of interests, ranging from the nation's largest quilting show to auto, boat, home, and gun shows.

Houston's theatre scene is far larger than the Theatre District, with more than 30 professional, regional, and community theatre companies producing full seasons of theatrical productions. The most notable being the Alley Theatre, founded in 1947, the Alley is the only theatre in Texas to win the Tony Award for best Regional Theatre and is the third oldest professional theatre in America. The Alley produces a variety of classical and modern works annually. Throughout its history the Alley has produced numerous world premiers and productions that transferred to Broadway. Theatre Under the Stars, is Houston's premier musical theatre company, which performs in residence at The Hobby Center for the Performing Arts and produces an admission free musical every summer at Miller Outdoor Theatre. Other notable theaters include The Ensemble Theatre, which gives voice to the African-American community and Talento Bilingüe de Houston, which spotlights playwrights and actors who express the Latino experience in America. Other significant theatres include Main Street Theater, with its broad spectrum of classical and contemporary classics, the quirky Theatre Suburbia, which has developed a reputation in the Houston arts community for showcasing local playwrights emphasizing a peculiarly Texas perspective, Stages Repertory Theatre, which focuses on bringing original works and regional premiers to Houston, Catastrophic Theatre Company, a "pay what you can company" that produces experimental theatre, Stark Naked Theatre, a theatre company founded by actors to empower their own work, and Mildred's Umbrella Theatre, which showcases plays featuring strong females.

Adjacent to the Texas Medical Center is the Museum District, which is home to most of the city's major museums: the Museum of Fine Arts, Houston; the Contemporary Arts Museum Houston; the Cullen Sculpture Garden; the Houston Museum of Natural Science; the Holocaust Museum Houston; the Children's Museum of Houston; Lawndale Art Center; the Houston Zoo; the John P. McGovern Museum of Health & Medical Science; and The Menil Collection.

== Tourism and recreation ==
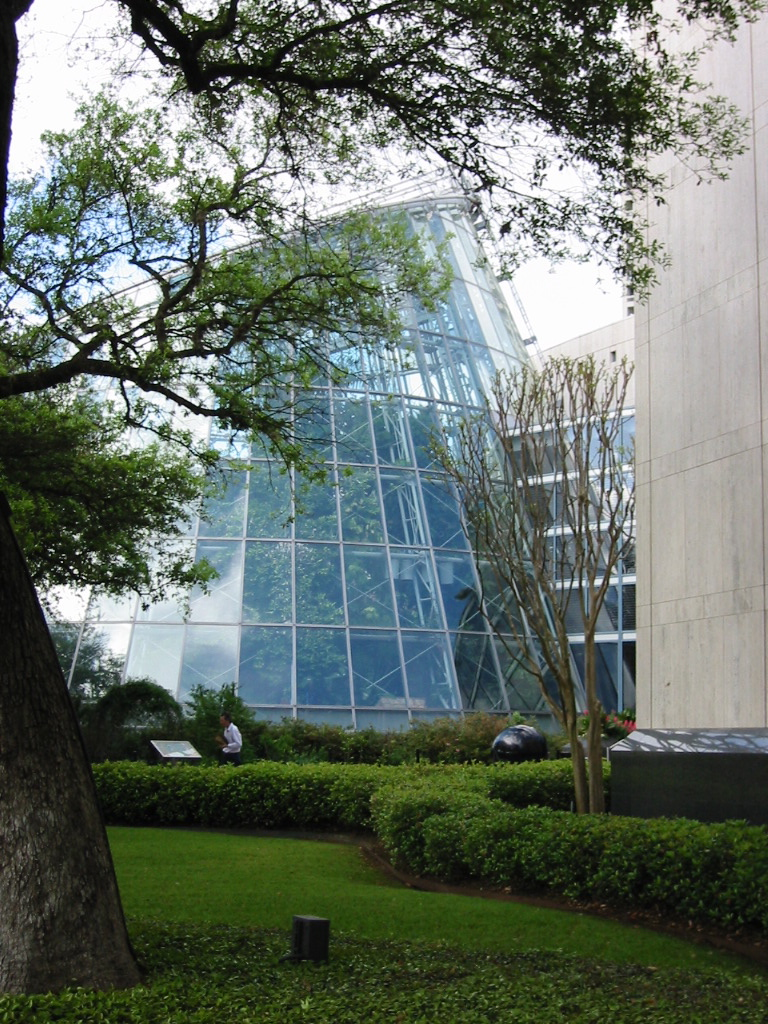
Cockrell Butterfly Area, Houston Museum of Natural Science

Space Center Houston is the official visitors’ center of NASA's Lyndon B. Johnson Space Center. Space Center Houston includes many interactive exhibits—including Moon rocks and a Space Shuttle simulator—in addition to special presentations that tell the story of NASA's crewed space flight program.

The Theater District, a 17-block area in the heart of downtown Houston, is home to Bayou Place Entertainment Complex, restaurants, movies, plazas, and parks. Bayou Place is a large multilevel building that is home to restaurants, bars, live music, billiards, theatres, and art house films. The Houston Verizon Wireless Theatre stages a variety of live concerts and the Angelika Theatre presents the latest in art, foreign, and independent films.

Houston is home to many parks including Hermann Park, which houses the Houston Zoo and the Houston Museum of Natural Science, and Memorial Park. What was once the Houston Civic Center was replaced by the George R. Brown Convention Center, one of the nation's largest; and the Jesse H. Jones Hall for the Performing Arts, home of the Houston Symphony Orchestra. The Sam Houston Coliseum and Music Hall have been replaced by the Hobby Center for the Performing Arts.

Other tourist attractions include the Galleria, Texas' largest shopping mall located in the Uptown District; Old Market Square; Tranquility Park; and Sam Houston Historical Park, which contains restored homes (built between 1823 and 1905) and reconstructed buildings. The San Jacinto Battlefield is in the nearby city of Deer Park.

== Sports ==
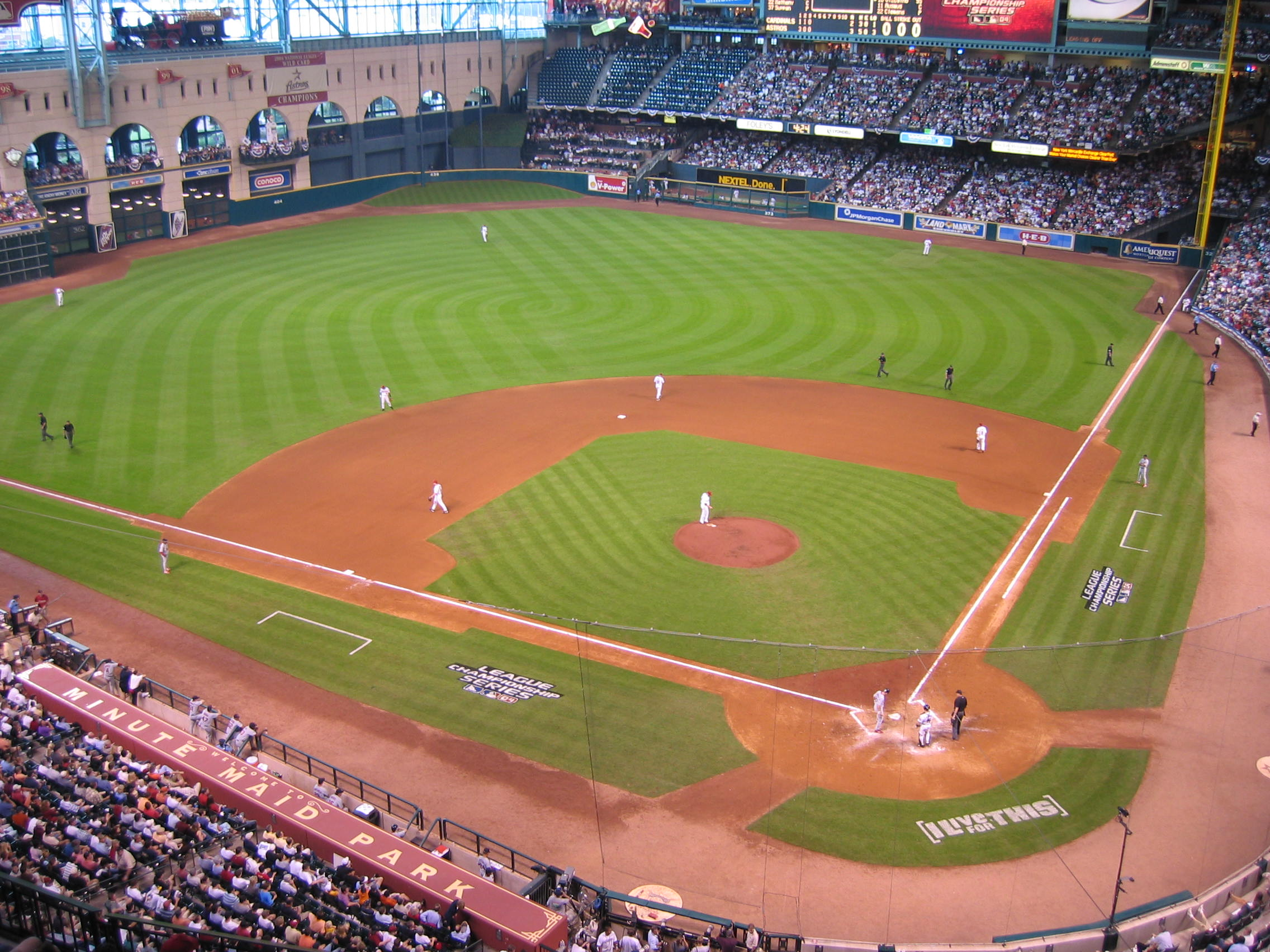
Daikin Park

Houston is home to professional franchises for four major team sports: the Houston Astros of Major League Baseball (MLB), the Houston Rockets in the National Basketball Association (NBA), the Houston Texans in the National Football League (NFL), and Houston Dynamo FC in Major League Soccer (MLS). Houston is also host to the Houston Dash of the National Women's Soccer League. Additionally, several of Houston's universities participate in collegiate sports.

The Houston Astros currently compete in the West Division of the MLB's American League. The Astros were established in 1962 as the Houston Colt .45s and entered the National League as an expansion team. The current name was adopted three years later, when the team moved into the Astrodome, nicknamed by fans as the "Eighth Wonder of the World". In 2000, the Astros moved into Daikin Park, where they have played ever since. In 2005 the Astros made their first World Series appearance, where they were swept in four games by the Chicago White Sox. In 2011, businessman Jim Crane purchased the team and moved the Astros to the American League, where they first competed in 2013. Since the mid 2010s, the Astros have become one of the MLB's most successful clubs, winning over 100 games in four seasons, appearing in six consecutive American League Champion Series, and winning four American League Penants. The Astros won their first World Series in 2017 against the Los Angeles Dodgers. They appeared in the 2019 World Series against the Washington Nationals and in 2021 against the Atlanta Braves. In 2022, the Astros beat the Philadelphia Phillies to claim their second World Series title. The Astros are the only team to win a postseason series in six straight seasons.

The Houston Texans currently play in the NFL's American Football Conference (AFC) Southern division. They currently play home games at NRG Stadium The Texans were founded in 1999 and first played in 2002 as an expansion team. Houston previously hosted an NFL franchise, the Houston Oilers, from 1960 to 1969 until they moved to Nashville and became the Tennessee Titans. The Texans are the youngest franchise currently competing in the NFL. The Texans won first division championship in 2011, and won the AFC South Division Championship in 2012, 2015, 2016, 2018, 2019. They are one of four franchises that have never appeared in a Super Bowl.

The Houston Rockets are a member of the NBA's Western Conference Southern Division, playing home games at the Toyota Center. Established in 1967 as the San Diego Rockets, the team relocated to Houston in 1971. The Rockets have won two NBA championships: one in 1994 against the New York Knicks, and again in 1995 against the Orlando Magic. They have also won four Western Conference titles. The Houston Comets of the Women's National Basketball League were active from 1997 until their dissolution in 2008. The team was considered the league's first dynasty, winning the most championships of any WNBA franchise along with the Minnesota Lynx. Several of the team's members, such as Cynthia Cooper, Sheryl Swoopes and Tina Thompson are considered among the greatest WNBA players of all time. The team was disbanded by the league during the Great Recession after new ownership could not be found.

Professional soccer came to Houston in 2005 with the establishment of Houston Dynamo FC, which competes in the Western Conference of the MLS. Previously, the club competed as the San Jose Earthquakes before moving to Houston. The club currently plays at PNC Stadium in East Downtown Houston. In 2013, the Dynamo announced that the club had secured an expansion franchise with the National Women's Soccer League (NWSL). The team, named the Houston Dash, began competing in the NWSL's 2014 season.

Houston was previously home to two professional ice hockey teams, both called the Houston Aeros. The first iteration of the Houston Aeros played in the World Hockey Association from 1972 until folding in 1978 after an unsuccessful bid to join the NHL. The second iteration of the Houston Aeros played in the International Hockey League from 1994 to 2001 and the American Hockey league from 2001 until the team's relocation to Des Moines, Iowa where they began the 2013-14 AHL season as the Iowa Wild. Houston has never fielded a National Hockey League (NHL) team. In 1998, former Houston Rockets owner Leslie Alexander made an unsuccessful attempt to relocate the NHL's Edmonton Oilers to Houston. In recent years, prominent figures in the city have expressed interest in bringing the NHL to Houston, such as current Rockets owner Tilman Fertitta. In 2017 The Athletic reported that Fertitta met with NHL representatives to discuss the viability of an NHL team in Houston. While he denied that any teams would be relocating to the city, NHL commissioner Gary Bettman said, "If Houston were to express an interest in having an NHL franchise, under the right circumstances, it's something we might want to consider." Former Houston Texans defensive end J.J. Watt has also expressed interest in NHL coming to Houston. Media has speculated that the Arizona Coyotes would be the most likely candidate for relocation to Houston after the city of Glendale announced it would not renew the Coyotes lease at the Gila River Arena, though representatives for the NHL denied the claims.

Houston hosted Super Bowl VIII in 1974, Super Bowl XXXVIII 30 years later in 2004, and Super Bowl LI in 2017 (making it the only Texas city to host the Super Bowl three times), the 1989 NBA All-Star Game, the 1981, 1986, 1994 and 1995 NBA Finals (The hometown Houston Rockets winning the latter 2), 2004 Major League Baseball All-Star Game, Super Bowl XXXVIII in 2004, 2005 World Series, the 2005 Big 12 Conference championship game, the 2006 NBA All-Star Game, and the Tennis Masters Cup in 2003 and 2004, and the annual Shell Houston Open. The city hosts the NCAA College Baseball Minute Maid Classic every February. Houston formerly hosted the NCAA football's Houston Bowl in December, but now hosts the Texas Bowl in January.

In early 2006, the Champ Car auto racing series returned to Houston for a yearly race, held on the streets of the Reliant Park complex. The city had previously been home to a Champ Car round from 1998 to 2001.

Daikin Park (home of the Astros), Shell Energy Stadium (home of the Dynamo and Dash) and Toyota Center (home of the Rockets) are located downtown. The city has the first domed stadium in the United States, the Astrodome, and also holds the NFL's first retractable roof stadium – Reliant Stadium. Other sports facilities in Houston are Hofheinz Pavilion, Reliant Astrodome, Robertson Stadium, and Rice Stadium. The now infrequently used Reliant Astrodome hosted World Wrestling Entertainment's WrestleMania X-Seven on April 1, 2001.

== Media ==
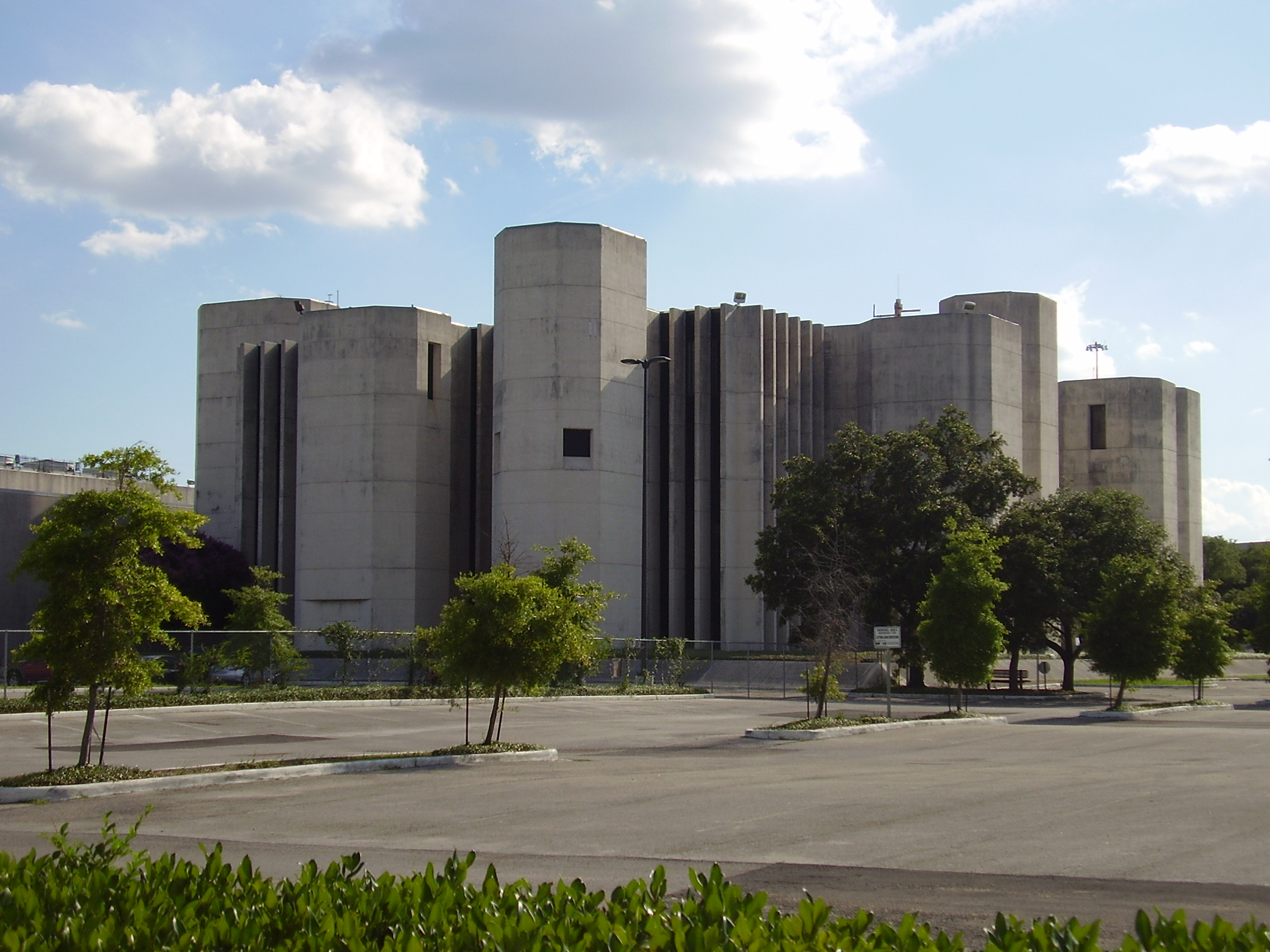
The current Houston Chronicle headquarters, formerly the Houston Post headquarters

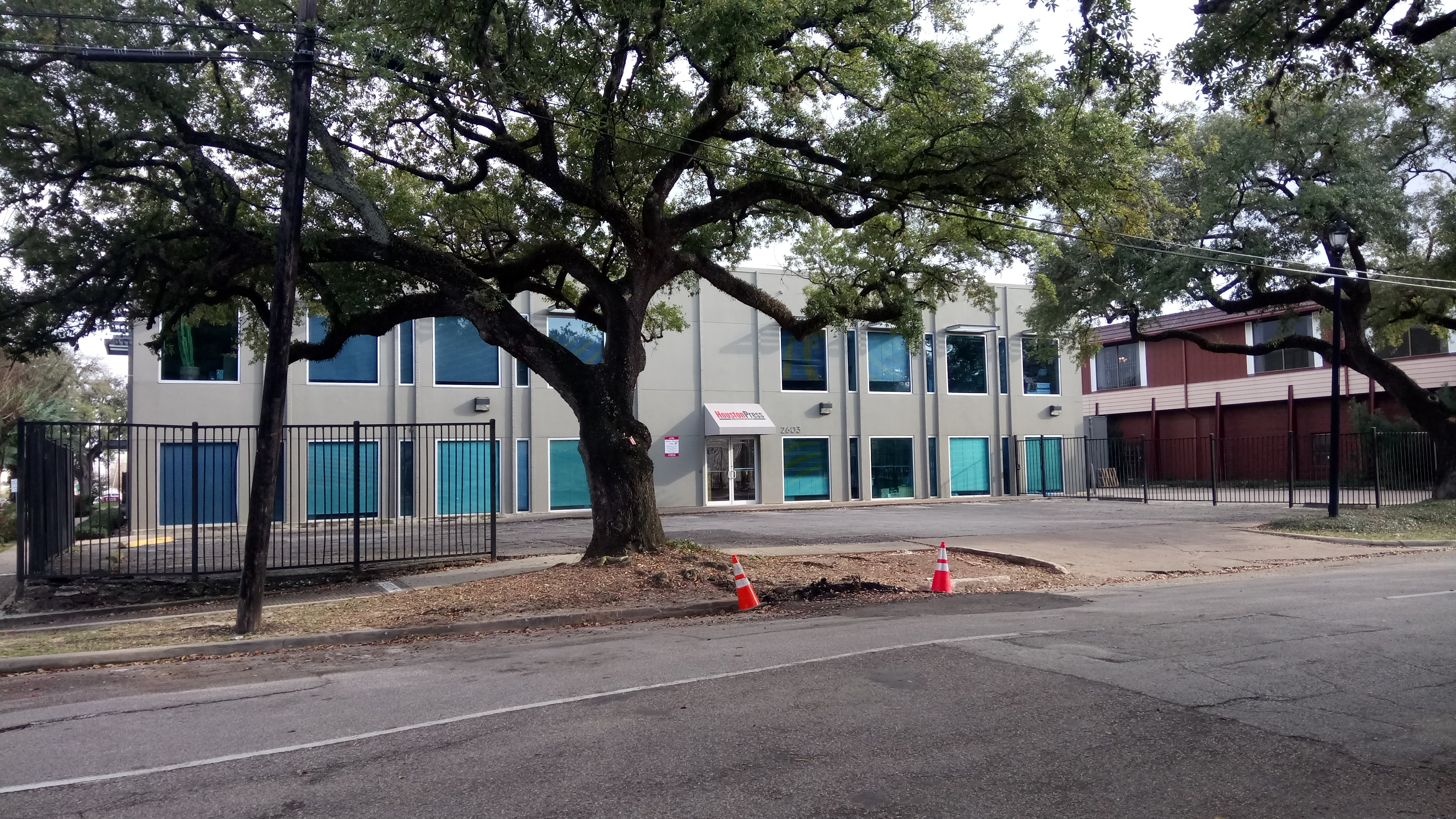
Houston Press headquarters in Midtown Houston

Greater Houston metropolitan area is served by a public television station and one public radio station. KUHT (HoustonPBS) is a PBS member station and the first public television station in the United States. Houston Public Radio is listener-supported radio with one NPR member station, KUHF (KUHF News). The University of Houston System owns and holds broadcasting licenses to KUHT and KUHF. The stations broadcast from the Melcher Center for Public Broadcasting, located on the campus of the University of Houston.

Houston is served by the Houston Chronicle, its only major daily newspaper with wide distribution. The Hearst Corporation, which owns and operates The Houston Chronicle, bought the assets of the Houston Post—its long-time rival and main competition—when it ceased operations in 1995. The only other major publication to serve the city is the Houston Press, an online newspaper covering arts and culture. Houston Press previously published an alternative weekly until 2017, when it moved to an online-only format

KTRK's Marvin Zindler became a recognized television journalist throughout the United States in the 1970s. His week-long exposé on the Chicken Ranch brothel became the basis for the Broadway musical The Best Little Whorehouse in Texas, and his consumer and health reports on local restaurants, usually focusing on the presences of cockroaches and rats, have made the phrase "slime in the ice machine" immediately recognizable to any local.

KHOU-TV's investigative team, "The 11 News Defenders", began an investigation into the failure of Firestone Wilderness AT tires on several vehicles (including the Ford Explorer). These reports garnered the station and the team of Anna Werner, investigative producer David Raziq, and investigative photojournalist/editor Chris Henao several national awards, including the Edward R. Murrow, George Foster Peabody, and Columbia University DuPont Award. Among the journalists who have worked for KHOU, the best known are former CBS Evening News anchor Dan Rather, Linda Ellerbee, and Jessica Savitch.

KXLN Houston's Spanish language Univision and its "En Su Defensa" (in your defense) segments have garnered regional acclaim, and "En Su Defensa" month was proclaimed by Mayor Bill White in 2004. Led by Investigative reporter Patricio Espinoza, the segment generated strong community following and historic ratings along with several Emmy awards through 2005.

== Car culture ==
Automobiles of all kinds have had enormous influence on Houston culture, largely a result of the urban sprawl and sparse public transportation that has followed the dismantling of the city's former trolley system. Many of the Houston's business districts, such as Uptown and Greenspoint began their development as edge cities. Furthermore, many notable neighborhoods began as streetcar suburbs, including the Heights and Sharpstown.

Car culture is often celebrated by residents, especially during the annual Art Car Parade where many uniquely modified cars are paraded through the Heights neighborhood. Another car culture celebrated in Houston is the slab culture, usually found in Houston's inner city neighborhoods (including former Houston-area suburban communities, e.g., South Park, Sunnyside, Acres Homes, and enclaves in Missouri City). The cars used for slabs are usually restored and/or customized full-size GM vehicles (Cadillac Fleetwood, Eldorado, Buick, or a restored Oldsmobile, e.g., Cutlass, Delta 88). The slab culture is associated with Houston hip-hop musicians.

Although Houston is considered a car dependent city, in recent years the city has made investments in public transportation. The Metropolitan Transit Authority of Harris County operates bus, light rail, bus rapid transit, HOV and HOT lanes, and paratransit services in the city and Harris County at large. METRORail, Houston's light rail system opened in 2004, and today operates three lines across 22.7-miles (36.5 km) of tracks throughout the city.

== Speech patterns ==
As of 2018, in English, the prepositions up, down, out, and over are used, by residents of Houston, to refer to traveling to points, within about a 100 miles (160 km) radius: north (Conroe), south (Galveston), west (Katy), and east (Baytown and Beaumont). The modifier "way" as in "way out" may be used for more distant points such as Brookshire and Crosby.

Author James W. Corder wrote in Yonder: Life on the Far Side of Change that he adhered to the said prepositions no matter how far away a place was. John Nova Lomax of Texas Monthly stated that he typically did not adhere to the prepositions for more distant cities of about 100 miles (160 km), and/or at least about one to two hours driving distance, away, especially in regards to east-west travel (for example to the state of Louisiana, the city of New Orleans, and San Antonio), while he continued to use the prepositions for further-out places to the north and south (such as Corpus Christi, Dallas, and the Rio Grande Valley).

== Music ==
Houston has a lively music scene and while it can claim no broad genre as its own, it has been fertile ground for the development of niche styles in American blues and Latin music --- a tradition that continues today with a uniquely distinctive regional style emerging in Houston's rap music community.

=== Classical ===
Houston's reputation as a mature center for classical music is the product of more than a century of dedication and community support. The Houston Symphony (founded in 1913), is the largest and best-known of the city's professional orchestras, but they are hardly the only option. Other significant orchestras include Mercury Houston, Ars Lyrica, and the River Oaks Chamber Orchestra, as well as outstanding academic orchestras at the Rice University Shepherd School of Music and the University of Houston Moores School of Music (home to the 800-seat Moores Opera House).

A full season of operas is performed in the downtown Theatre District by Houston Grand Opera, while a smaller community-based opera company (Opera in the Heights) performs in Lambert Hall. Operas are also performed each spring and fall at both the Shepherd School of Music and the Moores School of Music. Houston Grand Opera performs at least one free show each summer at the Miller Outdoor Theatre.

For classical choral music, Houston has several active groups, including Cantare Houston, the Houston Boychoir, Houston Ebony Music Society (also known as the Houston Ebony Opera Guild) and the Grammy Award-winning Houston Chamber Choir. The city is also home to one of the finest collegiate choral ensembles in the country, the UH Moores School of Music Concert Chorale.

=== Pop ===
As long as there's been popular music in America, there have been musicians who grew and developed in Houston contributing their own brand to the American cultural milieu. Pop icons from Houston include Hilary Duff, R&B singers Solange and Beyoncé, rockers ZZ Top, country legend Kenny Rogers, blues master Lightnin' Hopkins, tejano superstar Selena and the folksy country songwriter Lyle Lovett, among hundreds of others.

=== Blues ===
Blues music developed throughout the Southern United States where several areas developed distinctive regional sounds. Houston's distinctive sound grew in the 1920 with early influencers like Lightnin' Hopkins and T-Bone Walker. The sound matured over the next 50 years, during which it became known as Texas blues. The style would gain international notoriety in the modern era when it was adopted by popular regional rockers Stevie Ray Vaughan and ZZ Top, among others.

=== Tejano ===
Tejano is perhaps the most misunderstood of popular Houston musical styles because it is often classified as a style of Latin music, although the word "tejano" means Texan, reflecting the genre's roots in southern and central Texas during the 19th century. Modern Tejano music is usually a fusion style, combining the common historical elements of conjunto styles based around the accordion and bajo sexto with popular American styles --- most often country, R&B or rock. Within tejano music, Houston forged a distinctively modern sound that began with pop and rock fusions using electronic keyboards and synthesizers. The style was popularized in the 1980s and 1990s by the Grammy-award-winning Houston tejano band La Mafia, but which was thrust into a national and international spotlight by young female performer Selena. Selena's younger brother, A.B. Quintanilla, through his band Kumbia Kings would further push the Houston style of tejano even further by fusing it with hip-hop to create songs that appealed to a younger, more urban audience.

=== Hip-hop ===
Ben Westhoff, author of Dirty South: Outkast, Lil Wayne, Soulja Boy, and the Southern Rappers who Reinvented Hip-Hop, said that Houston is geographically isolated from other cities that have rap music traditions, so Houston rap music has its own slang and sound which does not "translate" in other regions. Many DJs like to severely slow down music and repeat lines several times, a style known as "chopped and screwed". The originator of "Chopped and Screwed" style music was the late Dj Screw. Screw began making this type of music while under the influence of promethazine with codeine cough syrup, the drinking of which is now heavily popularized in hip-hop culture. Westhoff says that the style, which slurs the speeches of the rappers, gives the music an "extraterrestrial quality." Bounce music also became popular in Houston in the aftermath of Hurricane Katrina. The popular music genre of Phonk mostly originated in Houston and in the city of Memphis, however the sub genre of drift phonk has its origins from Russia.

=== Country music ===
Houston has a country music scene.

=== Zydeco ===
Zydeco was developed in Houston by black Creole people that crossed the Sabine River from southwest Louisiana in the mid-20th century.

== Literature ==
The Ladies Reading Group of Houston was a significant founder of the public library system in Houston. Elizabeth Long, the author of the 2003 book Book Clubs: Women and the Uses of Reading in Everyday Life, wrote that Houston's "literary scene" contributes and draws upon the overall literary culture of Texas. The University of Houston creative writing program opened in 1979. Long wrote that this program "has achieved a national reputation" in subsequent decades. In 1985 the Ladies Reading Club had a 100th anniversary celebration.

The City of Houston designated its first Poet Laureate in April 2013, naming Gwendolyn Zepeda to the post. In April 2015, Dr. Robin Davidson became Houston's second Poet Laureate. In April 2017, Deborah Mouton became Houston's third Poet Laureate. In April 2019, Leslie Contreras Schwartz became Houston's fourth Poet Laureate.

In 2016, Dr. Robin Davidson announced that the office of the Poet Laureate was accepting submissions for an anthology of Houstonian's favorite poems. The project was conceived as a local version of the national Favorite Poem Project that had been founded in 1997 by U.S. Poet Laureate Robert Pinsky.

== Cuisine ==
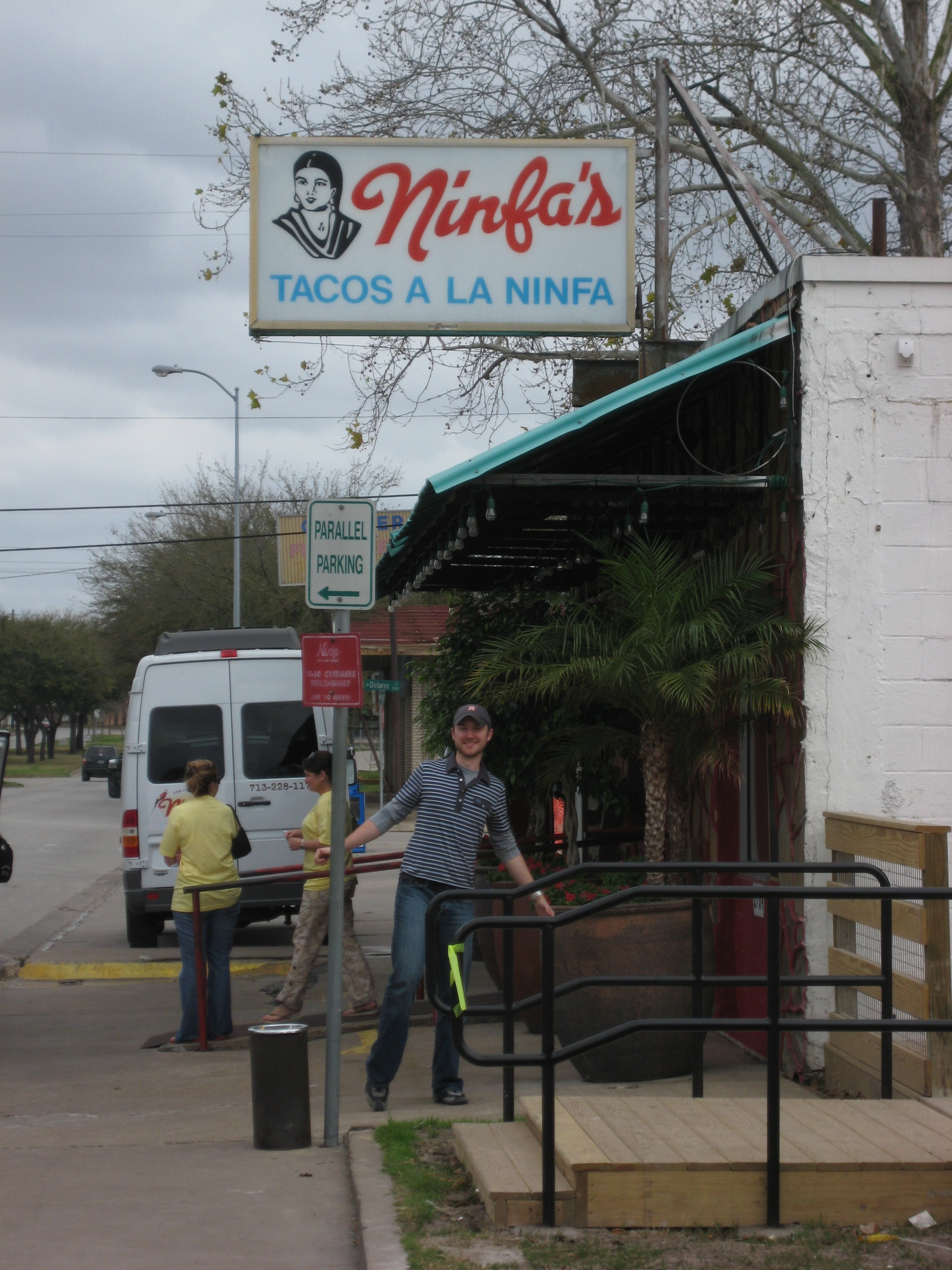
Ninfa's, a new style Tex-Mex restaurant

By 2005 USA Today referred to Houston as "the dining-out capital of the nation." Houstonians ate out at restaurants more often than residents of other American cities, and Houston restaurants have the second lowest average prices of restaurants of major cities. Tex-Mex cuisine, Cajun cuisine and Louisiana Creole cuisine are very popular in Houston. Many Mexican cuisine restaurants in Houston have aspects that originate from Texas culture.

As of 2014 the Houston area has relatively fewer national chain restaurants compared to other U.S. metropolitan areas due to the number of established local restaurant operations. Famous restaurateurs include Jim Goode and Ninfa Laurenzo as well as the families of Molina's, Pappas Restaurants, Carrabbas, and the Mandola's restaurants.

== Corporate involvement in culture ==
Members of the oil and gas industry are representatives of most of the boards of Houston's arts bodies, charities, and museums. The energy companies spent funds in order to make Houston a more attractive community for their employees to live in.

== Religion ==
Houston includes Christian, Jewish, Muslim, Hindu, Buddhist, Zoroastrian, and other religious groups.

== LGBT ==
Houston has one of the largest and most diverse gay communities in the nation.

== Recreation ==
The city has various YMCAs under the YMCA of Greater Houston.

Additionally there is a YWCA, the Gateway Branch. The YWCA opened the Masterson YWCA in 1981. It had 50,000 square feet (4,600 m^{2}) of space. Located near the Houston Heights, it was named after a donor, Carroll Masterson, and designed by Taft & Associates. By 2001 the Houston Chronicle reported that the building was in massive disrepair. It closed circa 2005 and in 2006 the YWCA sold the facility to the YMCA for $6.8 million.

== See also ==
- Houston Alternative Art
- Culture of Dallas
- Culture of San Antonio
- Culture of Texas
- Culture of the United States

Books about the culture of Houston:

- Cinema Houston
