= Thrust stage =

Stage that extends into the audience on three sides

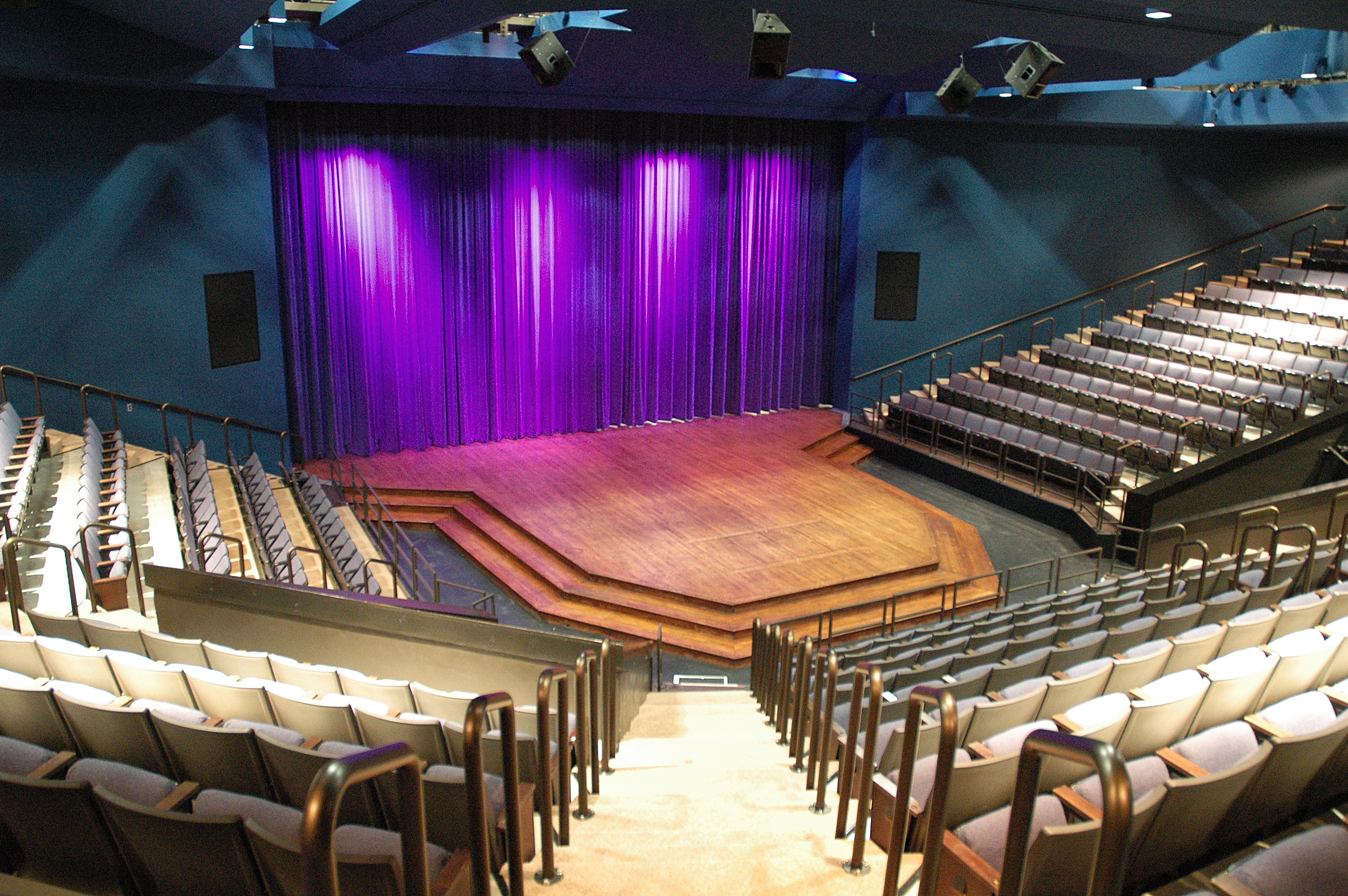
A thrust stage at the Pasant Theatre at Wharton Center for Performing Arts

In theatre, a thrust stage (a platform stage or open stage) is one that extends into the audience on three sides and is connected to the backstage area by its upstage end. A thrust has the benefit of greater intimacy between performers and the audience than a proscenium, while retaining the utility of a backstage area. This is in contrast to a theatre in the round, which is exposed on all sides to the audience, is without a backstage, and relies entirely on entrances in the auditorium or from under the stage. Entrances onto a thrust are most readily made from backstage, although some theatres provide for performers to enter through the audience using vomitory entrances. As with an arena, the audience in a thrust stage theatre may view the stage from three or more sides. Because the audience can view the performance from a variety of perspectives, it is usual for the blocking, props and scenery to receive thorough consideration to ensure that no perspective is blocked from view. A high-backed chair, for instance, when placed stage right, could create a blind spot in the stage left action.

== History ==
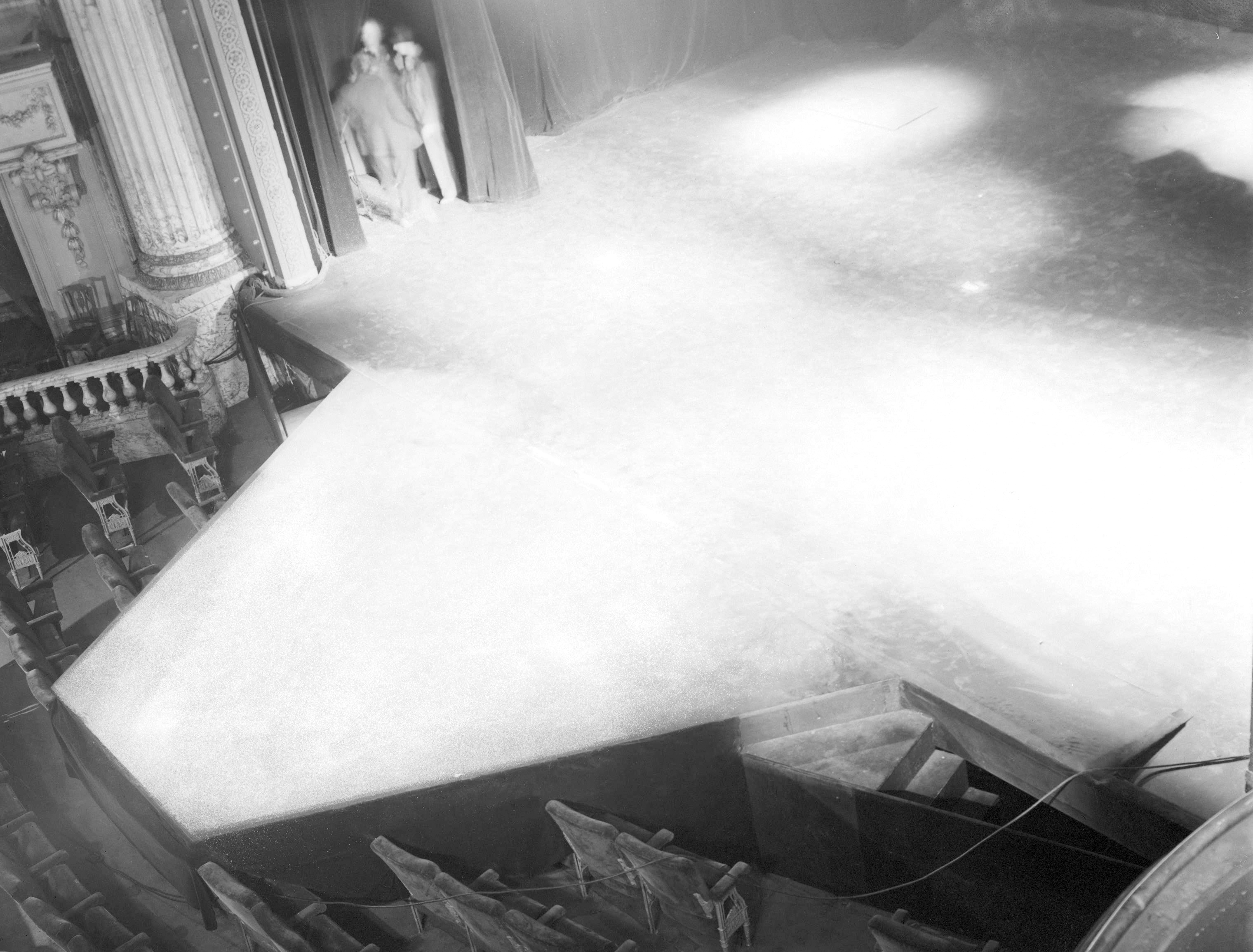
Photograph of the thrust stage used for the Federal Theatre Project production of Doctor Faustus (1937) at Maxine Elliott's Theatre, airbrushed in white to emphasize its contours

The thrust stage is the earliest stage type in western theatre, first appearing in Greek theatres, and its arrangement was continued by the pageant wagon. As pageant wagons evolved into Elizabethan theatre, many of that era's works, including those of Shakespeare, were performed on theatre with an open thrust stage, such as those of the Globe Theatre.

The thrust stage was generally out of use for centuries, and was resurrected by Orson Welles when he staged Doctor Faustus for the Federal Theatre Project in 1937. There, the thrust apron extended over three rows of seats at Maxine Elliott's Theatre, extending 20 feet. "It was constructed especially for the production and was probably one of the first to break out of the procenium arch in a Broadway playhouse", wrote critic Richard France.

Later resurrected by director Tyrone Guthrie and designer Tanya Moiseiwitsch, a thrust stage was used in 1953 by the Stratford Shakespeare Festival of Canada. Their Festival Theatre was originally under a tent, until a permanent thrust stage theatre facility was constructed in 1957. Since that time dozens of other thrust stage venues have been built using the concept.

== Examples ==
=== North America ===
==== Canada ====
- Prairie Theatre Exchange in Winnipeg, Manitoba
- Stratford Festival in Stratford, Ontario

==== United States ====
Westminster Playhouse in Westminster California

- Casa Mañana in Fort Worth, TX
- A Noise Within in Pasadena, CA
- ANTA Washington Square Theatre in Greenwich Village, New York (now demolished)
- Octagon Stage at the Alabama Shakespeare Festival in Montgomery, Alabama
- Mark Taper Forum in Los Angeles, CA
- John W. Huntington Theatre at Hartford Stage in Hartford, Connecticut
- La Nouba stage in Downtown Disney, Florida
- Alhambra Dinner Theatre in Jacksonville, Florida
- Gateway Theatre in Chicago
- Chicago Shakespeare Theatre in Chicago
- Ethel M. Barber Theater at Northwestern University in Evanston, Illinois
- Guthrie Theater in Minneapolis
- Greenbelt Arts Center in Greenbelt, Maryland
- Purple Rose Theatre in Chelsea, Michigan
- Pasant Theatre in East Lansing, Michigan
- Loretto-Hilton Center for the Performing Arts in Saint Louis, Missouri
- Crossroads Theater in New Brunswick, New Jersey
- George Street Playhouse in New Brunswick, New Jersey
- Circle in the Square Theatre, New York City
- Vivian Beaumont Theater at Lincoln Center, New York
- Mystère theater in the Treasure Island hotel in Paradise, Nevada
- Carolina Actors Studio Theatre in Charlotte, North Carolina
- Elevation Church in Charlotte, North Carolina
- O'Reilly Theater in Pittsburgh, Pennsylvania
- Kleberg Stage at the Zach Theatre in Austin, Texas
- Blackfriars Playhouse at the American Shakespeare Center in Staunton, Virginia
- Playhouse at the Overture Center for the Arts in Madison, Wisconsin
- American Players Theatre in Spring Green, Wisconsin
- Barksdale Theatre at the Shops at Willow Lawn in Richmond, Virginia
- Theatre Suburbia in Houston, Texas
- Berkeley Repertory Theatre in Berkeley, California
- Pacific Conservatory Theatre (PCPA) in Santa Maria, California

=== Europe ===
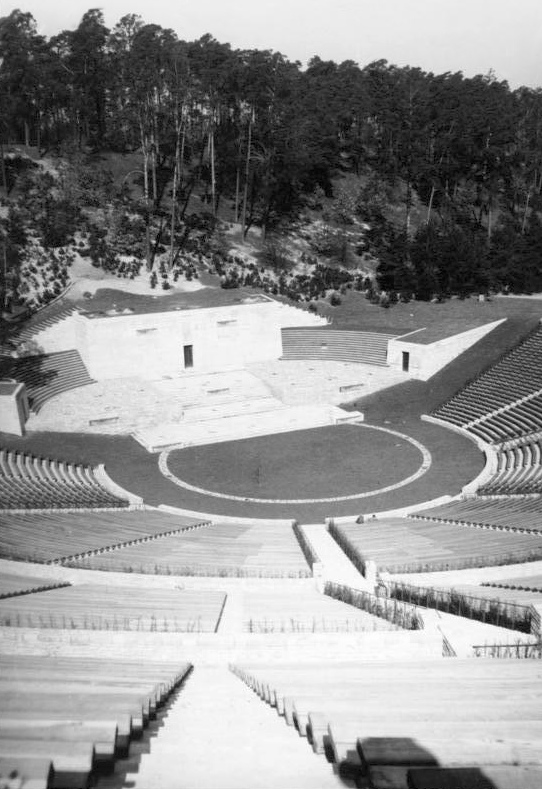
Waldbühne Berlin

==== Germany ====
- Waldbühne ("Forest Stage"), Berlin

==== Greece ====
- Numerous Greek theatres, such as the one in Epidaurus

==== United Kingdom ====
- Brighton Open Air Theatre, Brighton
- Questors Theatre, Ealing
- Crucible Theatre in Sheffield, England
- Gulbenkian Theatre in Canterbury, England
- Globe Theatre and Shakespeare's Globe in London, England. All other Elizabethan theatres were also in the same style.
- Olivier Theatre in the National Theatre, London
- Everyman Theatre in Liverpool, England
- Chichester Festival Theatre. Notable for the fact that the stage is hexagonal, and is surrounded by the audience on three sides.
- Swan Theatre in Stratford-upon-Avon, England
- Royal Shakespeare Theatre in Stratford-upon-Avon, England
- Courtyard Theatre in Stratford-upon-Avon, England (former theatre)
- Quarry Theatre at the Leeds Playhouse
- Riverside Theatre in Coleraine, Northern Ireland (former theatre)

=== Asia ===
==== India ====
- Prithvi Theatre, Mumbai
- Bharat Bhavan, Bhopal, Madhya Pradesh
- Ranga Shankara, Bangalore

==== Singapore ====
- Ngee Ann Kongsi Theatre, located at W!LD RICE Funan

=== Oceania ===
==== Australia ====
- York Theatre, part of the Seymour Centre, Sydney
- Roundhouse Theatre, part of WAAPA, Perth
