= Talento Bilingüe de Houston =

Coordinates: 29.7610°N 95.3447°W

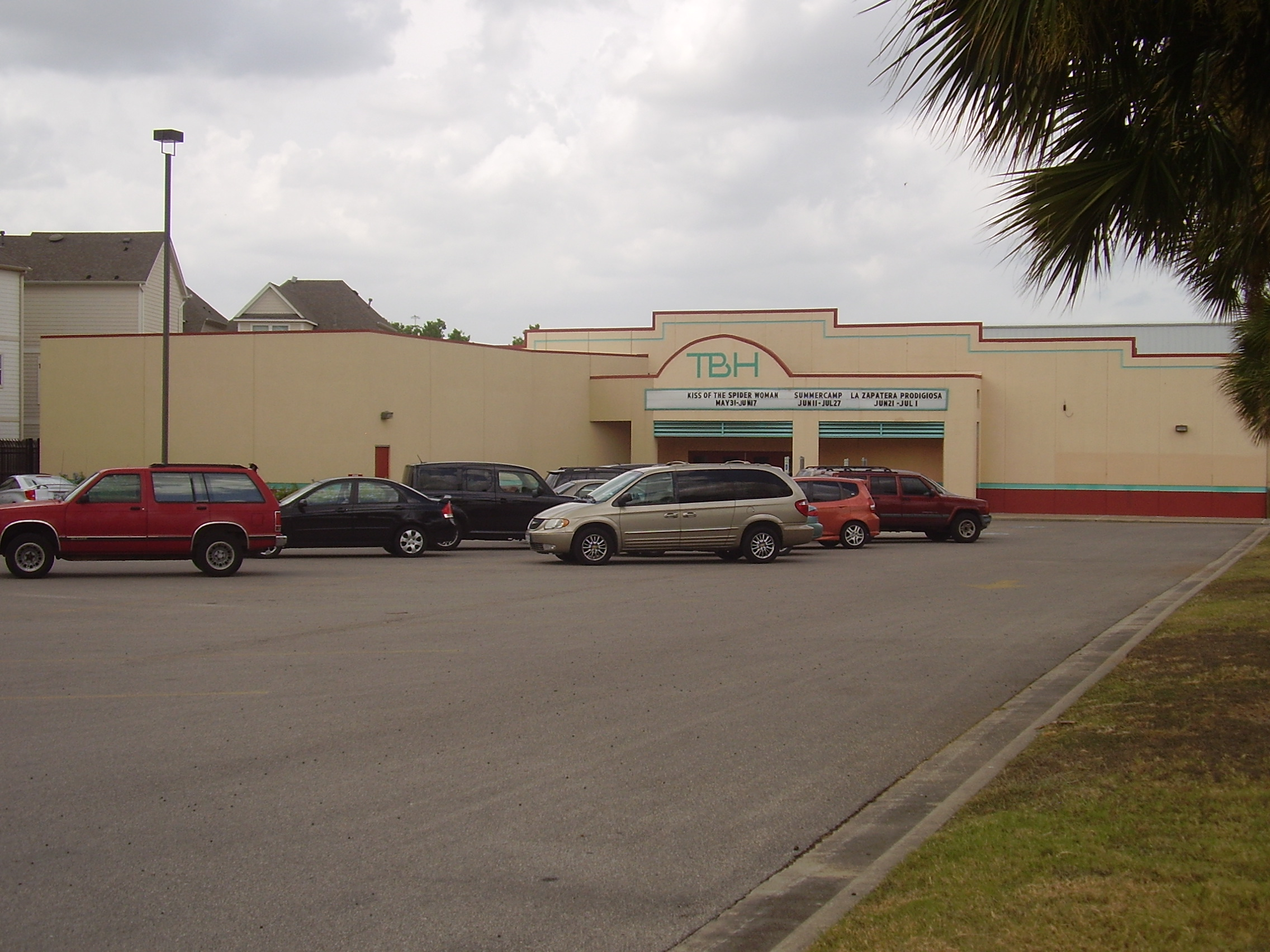
Talento Bilingüe de Houston

Talento Bilingüe de Houston (TBH, "Bilingual Theater of Houston") is a bilingual English-Spanish theater in the Second Ward in the East End, Houston, Texas. It is located at the intersection of Jensen Road and Navigation Drive, adjacent to Guadalupe Park, and two city blocks from Downtown Houston.

== History ==
Arnold Mercado, a Puerto Rican who previously lived in New York City, founded the Teatro Español de Houston ("Spanish-language theater of Houston") and used a Community Engagement and Touring Artists (CETA) grant to hire young Texan Hispanic and Latino actors. Mercado said that he changed the theater's name to "Teatro Bilingüe de Houston" (Bilingual Theater of Houston") after, in 1977, a government site visitor had an inquiry about the name of the theater. Mercado said that he changed the name because, at the time, there was a controversy over whether the federal government should fund non-English only programs; the theater's mission was to produce Spanish-language plays. After the name change, Reyes announced that the theater would now produce bilingual plays, but he had not yet decided whether plays would alternate between English and Spanish, or whether the plays would be in Spanglish.

It was originally located in the Casa de Amigos Community Center in Northside. It moved to the Ripley House Community Center in the Second Ward two years after its beginning. In 1984 Richard Reyes, an executive with the theater, changed the name to the current name; he said he did this because many third-generation Hispanic Houstonians did not like the previous name, and in some cases were unable to pronounce it. Reyes coined the acronym "TBH," and he said that students had a favorable reception to the new acronym. The theater moved to its current location 12 years prior to 2008. In 1995 the theater received a $980,000 ($2022279.97 in today's money) City of Houston Community Development Grant to build a new facility due to the theater's work with inner city youth to prevent them from joining gangs. The theater moved into a 18,000-square-foot (1,700 m^{2}) building that includes administrative offices, a 240-seat theater, a gallery space, a rehearsal room, a commercial kitchen, and a professional dance studio.

In 2000, Reyes cancelled summer classes and changed activities to be only half day events rather than full day events after the nonprofit screening and placement agency HoustonWorks suddenly announced that there would be a lack of student workers; HoustonWorks said that changes in federal funding caused the shortage of student workers to occur. As of 2008 the theater had private security guards in light of the homeless and vagrant population that occupied Guadalupe Park. When visiting school groups travel to the park, usually a guard accompanies them.

== See also ==
- Culture of Houston
