= Cinema Houston =

2007 book by David Welling

Cinema Houston: From Nickelodeon to Megaplex
- Author: David Welling
- Language: English
- Genre: Non-fiction
- Publisher: University of Texas Press
- Publication date: 2007
- Publication place: United states
- Pages: 256

Cinema Houston: From Nickelodeon to Megaplex is a 2007 book by David Welling and published by the University of Texas Press. It, with 256 pages, discusses historic movie theaters, of multiple varieties, in the city of Houston. According to Ron Briley, a teacher at Sandia Preparatory School who wrote a review for the Southwestern Historical Quarterly, the book is "essentially a nostalgic volume in which Welling laments that in its rapid urban development Houston destroyed many of the lavish movie palaces which once dotted the city's downtown landscape." According to Aaron Carpenter, an undergraduate student at Duke University who wrote a review published in Cite: The Architecture + Design Review of Houston, the author shows his passion for the subject and that the book does not always have a tone of melancholy.

Welling had the following steps in his research: he checked opening and closing dates and variations of names in directories published by the city government, then consulted newspapers-the Houston Chronicle and Houston Post-to clarify particular dates. Welling went to branches of the Houston Public Library to get copies of photographs of the theaters. Welling stated that the majority of the information he received came from the latter and that establishing the exact dates that a theater opened and/or closed was "the most time consuming" aspect of his research.

The book has some discussion of theaters catering to arthouse cinema while most of the space is devoted to facilities for mainstream films.

Briley wrote that by providing a chronology for the "thumbnail sketches", the author had "[made] a good effort to place the cinema of Houston in historical context". Briley added that the work "is more descriptive than analytical".

The now-demolished Metropolitan Theatre is on the cover.

== Reception ==
Carpenter concluded that the book "is fascinating, providing so much material for nostalgic reminiscences it is almost overwhelming."

== See also ==
- Culture of Houston
