= Robert Pinsky =

American poet, literary critic, academic (born 1940)

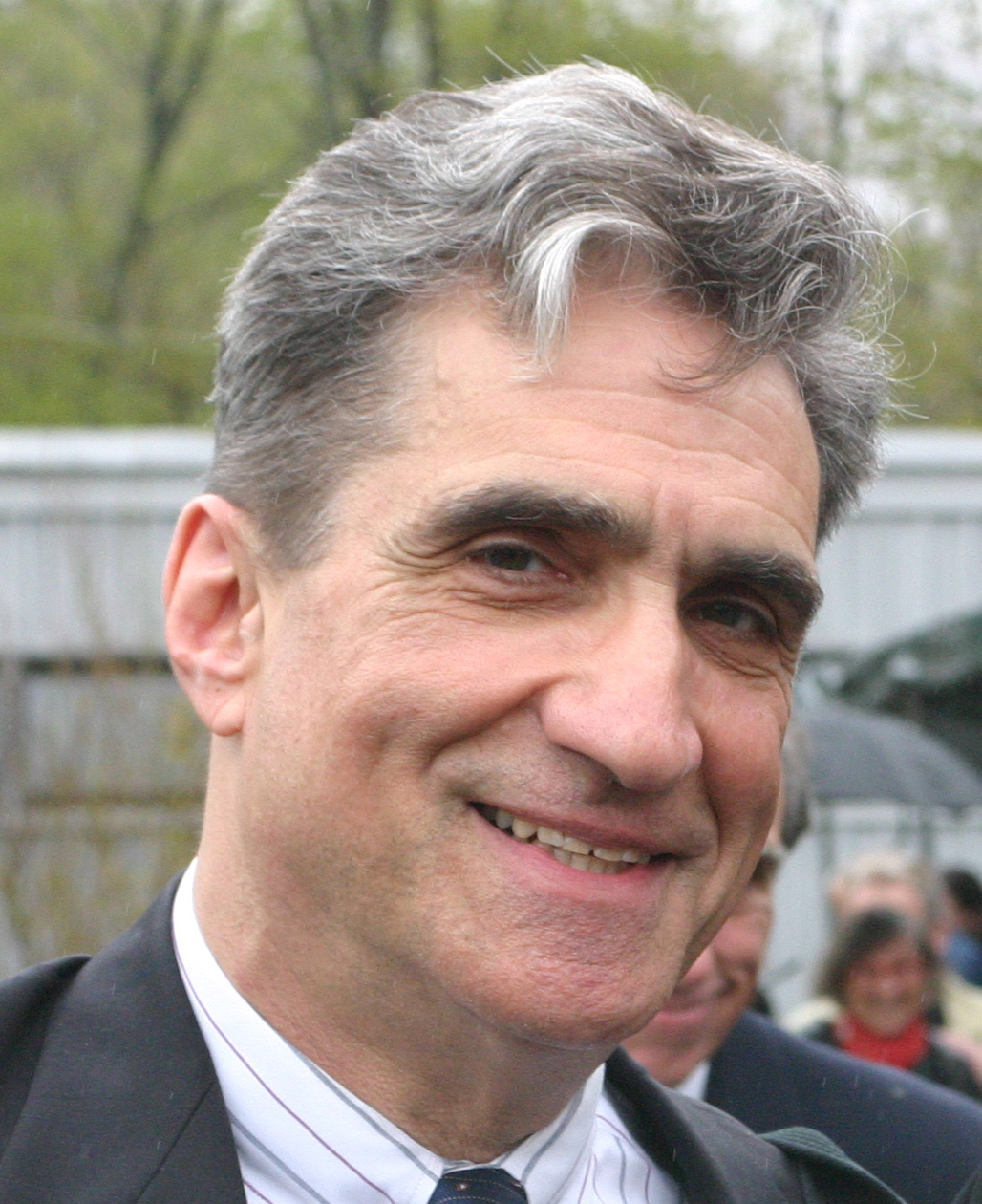
- Pinsky in 2005
- Born: October 20, 1940 (age 86); Long Branch, New Jersey, U.S.
- Education: Rutgers University (BA); Stanford University (MA, PhD)
- Occupations: poet, literary critic, editor, academic
- Spouse: Ellen Bailey (m. 1961)
- Children: 3
- Writing career
- Period: 1968–present
- Genres: poetry, literary criticism
- Notable work: Selected Poems (2011)

Robert Pinsky (born October 20, 1940) is an American poet, essayist, literary critic, and translator. He was the first United States Poet Laureate to serve three terms. Recognized worldwide, Pinsky's work has earned numerous accolades. Pinsky is a professor of English and creative writing in the graduate writing program at Boston University. In 2015, the university named him a William Fairfield Warren Distinguished Professor, the highest honor bestowed on senior faculty members who are actively involved in teaching, research, scholarship, and university civic life.

== Biography ==
=== Early life and education ===
Pinsky was born in Long Branch, New Jersey, to Jewish parents, Sylvia (née Eisenberg) and Milford Simon Pinsky, an optician. He attended Long Branch High School. He received a B.A. from Rutgers University in New Brunswick, New Jersey, and earned both an M.A. and PhD from Stanford University, where he was a Stegner Fellow in creative writing. He was a student of Francis Fergusson and Paul Fussell at Rutgers and Yvor Winters at Stanford.

=== Personal life ===
Pinsky married Ellen Jane Bailey, a clinical psychologist, in 1961. They have three children. Pinsky taught at Wellesley College and at the University of California at Berkeley, and since 1989 has lived in Cambridge, Massachusetts, and teaches in the graduate writing program at Boston University.

=== Career ===
Early on, Pinsky was inspired by the flow and tension of jazz and the excitement that it made him feel. As a former saxophonist, he has said that being a musician was a profoundly influential experience that he has tried to reproduce in his poetry. The musicality of poetry was and is extremely important to his work. Additionally, Pinsky revealed in a 1999 interview with Bomb Magazine that he enjoys jazz for its "physical immediacy, improvisation and also the sense that a lifetime of suffering and study and thought and emotion is behind some single phrase."

Pinsky has acknowledged that his poetry would change somewhat depending on the particular subjectivity of each reader. Embracing the idea that people's individuality would fill out the poem, he has said, "The poetry I love is vocal, composed with the poet's voice and I believe its proper culmination is to be read with a reader's imagined or actual voice. The human voice in that sense is not electronically reproduced or amplified; it's the actual living breath inside a body—not necessarily an expert's body or the artist's body. Whoever reads the poem aloud becomes the proper medium for the poem." Pinsky observes 'the kind of poetry I write emphasizes the physical qualities of the words' for poetry to Pinsky, is a vocal art, not necessarily performative, but reading to one self or recalling some lines by memory. Pinsky comments 'all language is necessarily abstract' . No aspect of a poem, he observes, is more singular, more unique, than its rhythm, for there are no rules.

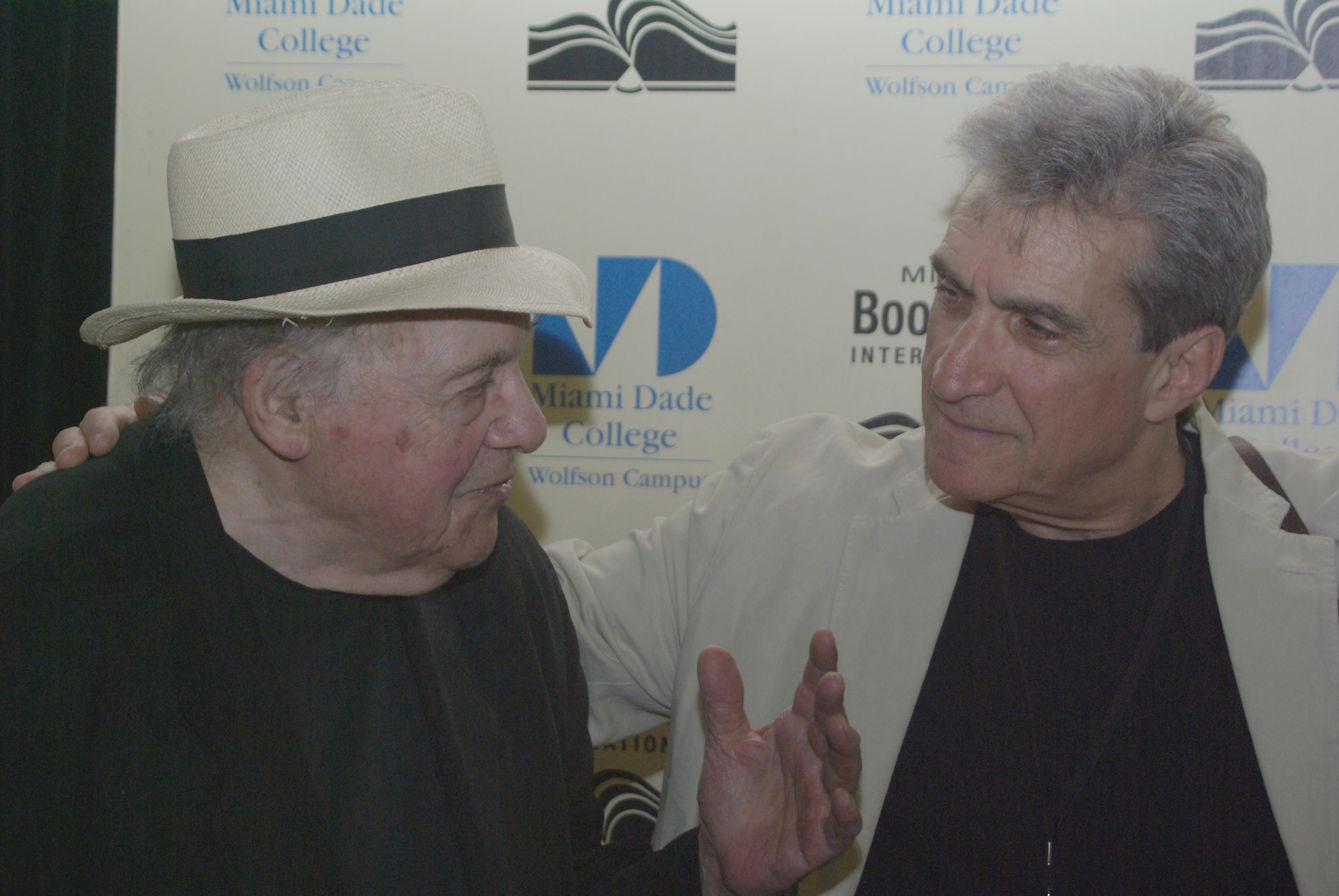
Pinsky (right) with Gerald Stern at the Miami Book Fair International 2011

He received a National Endowment for the Humanities Fellowship in 1974, and in 1997 he was named the United States Poet Laureate and Consultant in Poetry to the Library of Congress; he was the first poet to be named to three terms. As Poet Laureate, Pinsky founded the Favorite Poem Project, in which thousands of Americans of varying backgrounds, all ages, and from every state share their favorite poems. Pinsky believed that, contrary to stereotype, poetry has a strong presence in the American culture. The project sought to document that presence, giving voice to the American audience for poetry.

The Shakespeare Theatre of Washington, D.C. commissioned Pinsky to write a free adaptation of Friedrich Schiller's drama Wallenstein. The Shakespeare Theatre presented the play, starring Stephen Pickering in the title role, directed by Michael Kahn, in 2013. Premiering on April 17 of that year, the play had a sold-out run, in repertory with Coriolanus. Pinsky also wrote the libretto for Death and the Powers, an opera by composer Tod Machover. The opera received its world premiere in Monte Carlo in September 2010 and its U.S. premiere at Boston's Cutler Majestic Theater in March 2011. Pinsky is also the author of the interactive fiction game Mindwheel (1984) developed by Synapse Software and released by Broderbund.

Pinsky guest-starred in an episode of the animated sitcom The Simpsons TV show, "Little Girl in the Big Ten" (2002), and appeared on The Colbert Report in April, 2007, as the judge of a "Meta-Free-Phor-All" between Stephen Colbert and Sean Penn.

Since 2000, Farrar, Straus and Giroux have published five books of his poetry Jersey Rain (2000), Gulf Music (2007) Selected Poems (2011) At the Foundling Hospital (2016) and Proverbs of Limbo (2024).

In 2012, Circumstantial Productions released the CD, PoemJazz by Robert Pinsky and Laurence Hobgood. In 2015, House Hour: PoemJazz II was released.

Pinsky served as editor of the 25th anniversary volume of The Best of American Poetry anthologies called The Best of the Best of American Poetry (2013), and is the former poetry editor of Slate. He edited Singing School (2014), The Mind Has Cliffs of Fall: Poems at the Extremes of Feeling (2019) and The Book of Poetry for Hard Times (2021).

In 2023, W.W. Norton published Pinsky's memoir Jersey Breaks: Becoming an American Poet.

== Honors and awards ==
- Premio Capri (Italian) in 2009
- Manhae Foundation Prize (Korean) in 2006
- PEN/Voelcker Award for Poetry in 2004
- Golden Plate Award of the American Academy of Achievement in 1998
- Poet Laureate Consultant in Poetry to the Library of Congress (1997–2000)
- National Endowment for the Humanities Fellowship (1974)
- Stegner Fellowship in Creative Writing at Stanford University
- Saxifrage Prize (1980) for An Explanation of America
- William Carlos Williams Award of the Poetry Society of America
- Nominated for the National Book Critics Circle Award for Criticism (1988) for Poetry and the World
- Nominated for the Pulitzer Prize for Poetry (1996) for The Figured Wheel: New and Collected Poems, 1966–1996
- Ambassador Book Award in Poetry of the English Speaking Union
- Lenore Marshall Poetry Prize (1997) for The Figured Wheel: New and Collected Poems 1966–1996
- Los Angeles Times Book Award (1994) for The Inferno of Dante
- Book-of-the-Month Editor's Choice (1994) for The Inferno of Dante
- Academy of American Poets' Translation Award (1994) for The Inferno of Dante
- Ruth Lilly Poetry Prize for lifetime accomplishments (2026) from Poetry Foundation

Pinsky has received honorary doctorates from numerous institutions such as Northwestern University (2000), Binghamton University (2001), the University of Michigan (2001), Lake Forest College (2007), Emerson College (2012), Southern New Hampshire University (2014) University of Massachusetts Dartmouth (2016), and Merrimack College (2016)
