= United States Poet Laureate =

Official poet of the United States

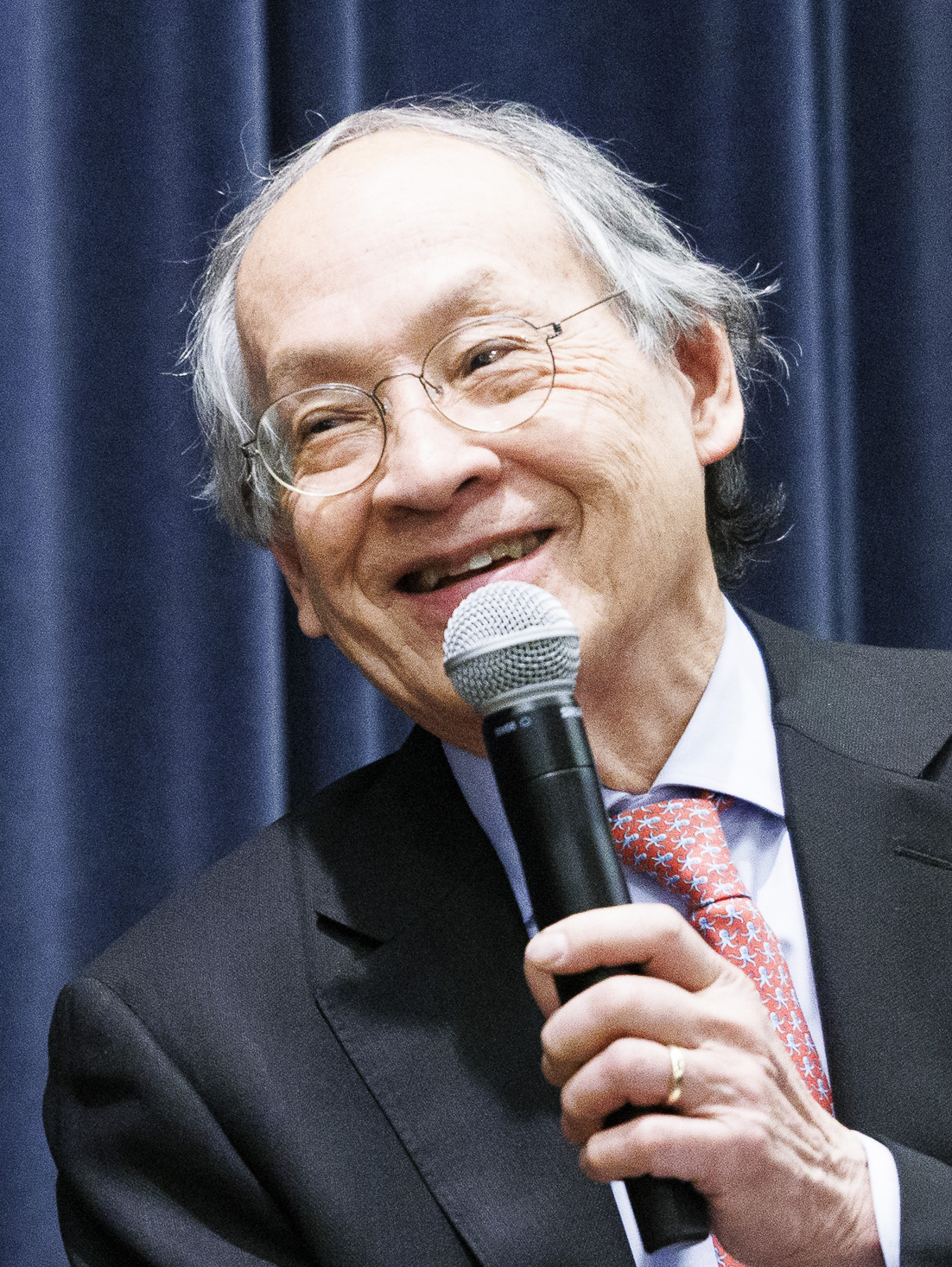
- Incumbent; Arthur Sze since 2025
- Appointer: Librarian of the United States Congress
- Term length: Two years
- Formation: 1937
- Salary: $60,000 annually
- Website: www.loc.gov/programs/poetry-and-literature/poet-laureate/

The poet laureate consultant in poetry to the Library of Congress, commonly referred to as the United States poet laureate, serves as the official poet of the United States. During their term, the poet laureate seeks to raise the national consciousness to a greater appreciation of the reading and writing of poetry. The position was modeled on the poet laureate of the United Kingdom. Begun in 1937, and formerly known as the consultant in poetry to the Library of Congress, the present title was devised and authorized by an Act of Congress in 1985. Appointed by the librarian of Congress, the poet laureate's office is administered by the Center for the Book. For children's poets, the Poetry Foundation awards the Young People's Poet Laureate.

The incumbent poet laureate (since 2025) is Arthur Sze. He is the first Asian American United States poet laureate.

== Overview ==
The poet laureate consultant in poetry is appointed by the librarian of Congress and usually serves a two-year term. In making the appointment, the librarian consults with current and former poets laureate and other distinguished personalities in the field.

Currently, the poet laureate receives a $60,000 annual stipend, endowed by a gift from Archer M. Huntington. On October 3, 1985, the U.S. Congress passed legislation authored by Senator Spark M. Matsunaga of Hawaii changing the title of the position to Poet Laureate Consultant in Poetry. The Library minimizes assigned duties, to allow incumbents to pursue their own projects while at the Library. The poet laureate presents an annual lecture and reading of their poetry and usually introduces poets at the Library's poetry series, the oldest in the Washington area and among the oldest in the United States. This annual series of public poetry and fiction readings, lectures, symposia, and occasional dramatic performances began in the 1940s. Collectively, the poets laureate have brought more than 2,000 poets and authors to the Library to read for the Archive of Recorded Poetry and Literature.

Each consultant has brought a different emphasis to the position. Maxine Kumin started a popular series of poetry workshops for women at the Library of Congress. Gwendolyn Brooks met with elementary school students to encourage them to write poetry. Joseph Brodsky initiated the idea of providing poetry in airports, supermarkets, and hotel rooms. Rita Dove, considered the first activist poet laureate, brought together writers to explore the African diaspora through the eyes of its artists, championed children's poetry and jazz with poetry events and read at the White House during Bill Clinton's first state dinner. Robert Hass organized a watershed conference that brought together popular novelists, poets, and storytellers to talk about writing, nature, and community, and co-founded the River of Words K–12 international children's poetry and art contest. Robert Pinsky initiated the Favorite Poem Project. Billy Collins's "Poetry 180" project distributed a poem to all high schools for every day of the school year. These poems were also collected and published in two anthologies.

== Lists of appointees ==
Each year links to its corresponding "[year] in poetry" article:

=== Consultants in poetry ===
- 1937–1941: Joseph Auslander
- 1943–1944: Allen Tate
- 1944–1945: Robert Penn Warren
- 1945–1946: Louise Bogan
- 1946–1947: Karl Shapiro
- 1947–1948: Robert Lowell
- 1948–1949: Léonie Adams
- 1949–1950: Elizabeth Bishop
- 1950–1952: Conrad Aiken
- 1952: William Carlos Williams
- 1956–1958: Randall Jarrell
- 1958–1959: Robert Frost
- 1959–1961: Richard Eberhart
- 1961–1963: Louis Untermeyer
- 1963–1964: Howard Nemerov
- 1964–1965: Reed Whittemore
- 1965–1966: Stephen Spender
- 1966–1968: James Dickey
- 1968–1970: William Jay Smith
- 1970–1971: William Stafford
- 1971–1973: Josephine Jacobsen
- 1973–1974: Daniel Hoffman
- 1974–1976: Stanley Kunitz
- 1976–1978: Robert Hayden
- 1978–1980: William Meredith
- 1981–1982: Maxine Kumin
- 1982–1984: Anthony Hecht
- 1984–1985: Reed Whittemore (interim)
- 1984–1985: Robert Fitzgerald
- 1985–1986: Gwendolyn Brooks

=== Poet laureate consultants in poetry ===
- 1986–1987: Robert Penn Warren
- 1987–1988: Richard Wilbur
- 1988–1990: Howard Nemerov
- 1990–1991: Mark Strand
- 1991–1992: Joseph Brodsky
- 1992–1993: Mona Van Duyn
- 1993–1995: Rita Dove
- 1995–1997: Robert Hass
- 1997–2000: Robert Pinsky
- 2000–2001: Stanley Kunitz
- 2001–2003: Billy Collins
- 2003–2004: Louise Glück
- 2004–2006: Ted Kooser
- 2006–2007: Donald Hall
- 2007–2008: Charles Simic
- 2008–2010: Kay Ryan
- 2010–2011: W. S. Merwin
- 2011–2012: Philip Levine
- 2012–2014: Natasha Trethewey
- 2014–2015: Charles Wright
- 2015–2017: Juan Felipe Herrera
- 2017–2019: Tracy K. Smith
- 2019–2022: Joy Harjo
- 2022–2025: Ada Limón
- 2025–: Arthur Sze

=== Special consultants in poetry ===
- 1999–2000 (for Library of Congress's 200th Anniversary) Rita Dove, Louise Glück, and W. S. Merwin

== See also ==
- American poetry
- List of poetry awards
- List of literary awards
- List of years in poetry
- List of years in literature
- National Youth Poet Laureate

== Sources ==
- "About the Position of Poet Laureate". Library of Congress. 2008.
- "Poet Laureate Timeline: 1953 – 1960". Library of Congress. 2008.
- This article incorporates public domain material from websites or documents of the Library of Congress.
