= Heights Christian Church =

Historic church in Texas, United States

- U.S. National Register of Historic Places
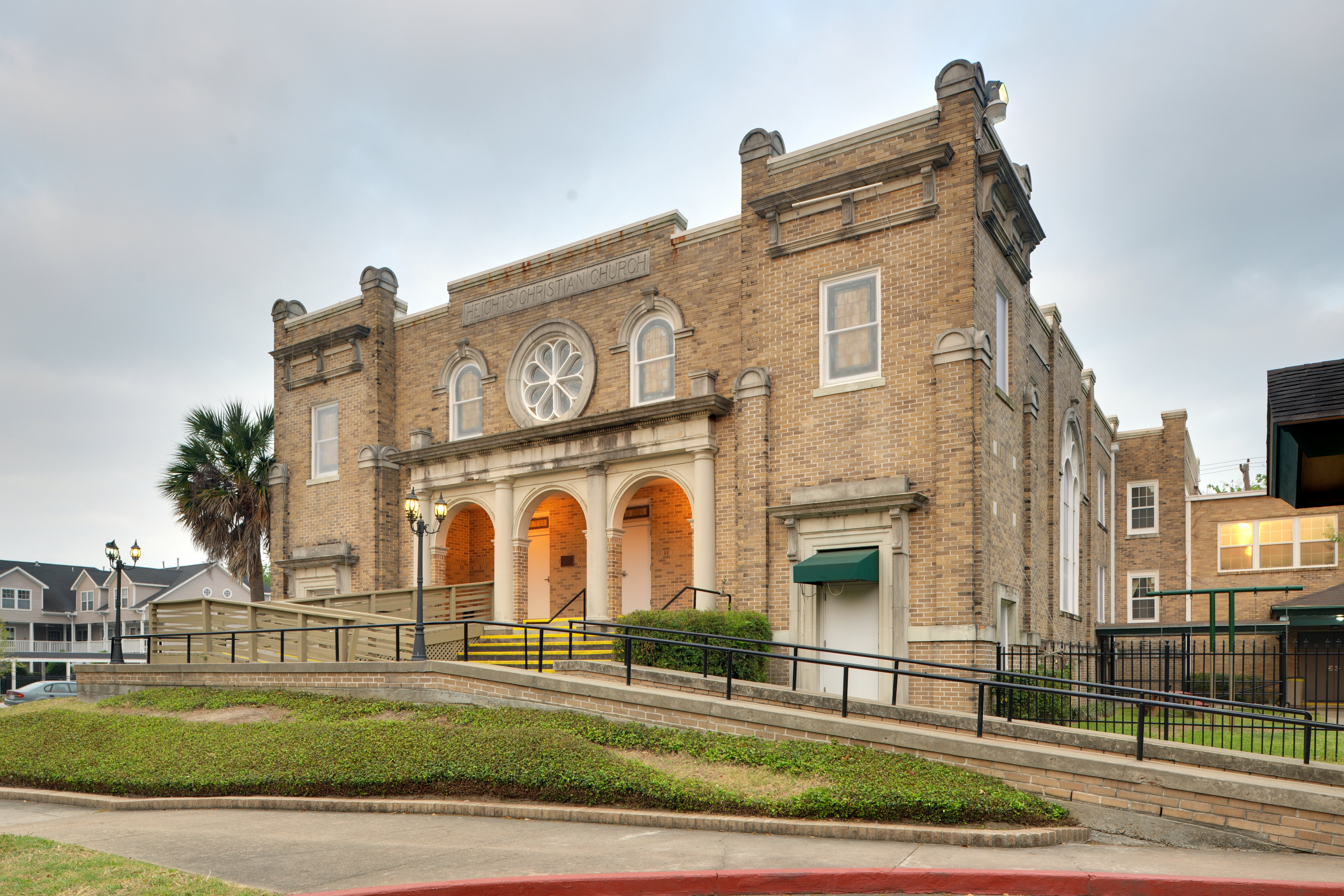

- Location within Texas Location within the United States
- Location: 1703 Heights Blvd., Houston, Texas
- Coordinates: 29°48′3″N 95°23′54″W
- Area: less than one acre
- Built: 1927
- Architectural style: Eclectic Classicism
- MPS: Houston Heights MRA
- NRHP reference No.: 83004438
- Added to NRHP: June 22, 1983

Heights Christian Church is a historic church at 1703 Heights Boulevard in the Houston Heights section of Houston, Texas.

It was built in 1927. In 1967 the congregation moved to a new location, but retained ownership of the building which was used for community events. The building was added to the National Register of Historic Places in 1983. It is now known as Lambert Hall and is used for community events, including operas.

== History ==
On July 31, 1927, the church held the ground-breaking ceremony and laid the cornerstone. Many Houston celebrities took part, including: Mayor Oscar F. Holcombe; Dr. Edison E. Oberholtzer, Superintendent of Public Schools and founder/president of the University of Houston; and pastors from other local churches. On October 23, 1927, the building was dedicated. Present were architect C. N. Nelson and contractor P. H. Fredericks. The building had been erected at a cost of $39,904.30, an amount that included the pews, art glass and lighting fixtures.

Heights Christian Church built its new sanctuary next door to Lambert Hall in 1967. After that year, Lambert Hall became available for community events. For several years, Lambert Hall was the home of the Heights Museum, which is now located in the fire station on 11th Street.

== Owners and tenants ==
=== Opera in the Heights ===
Opera in the Heights, a non-profit, professional regional opera company, held its first Gala Opera Evening in Lambert Hall on April 12, 1996. A few days later, an arsonist set fire to Lambert Hall, having poured flammables onto the piano and the backstage storage. A neighbor, Marie Campos, saw the fire in the early morning, and called the fire department, which arrived in minutes and saved the building.

Opera in the Heights held its next performance, a Gala II Concert, on May 11, 1996, in Lambert Hall, with a curtain hanging over fire damaged wall. Clean-up was financed by this benefit concert, a dinner party, and the church members, Opera in the Heights company members and neighbors. The restoration was done by Opera in the Heights Board member Theo Bashshiti and his construction crew.

Since 1996, Opera in the Heights and Heights Christian Church have worked together to renovate Lambert Hall. Grants from Houston Endowment, Inc. allowed Lambert Hall to be restored in the mid-2000s, with new floor surfaces, a rebuilt air conditioner, new seats, and restoration of the stained glass windows having been completed by late 2004. New lighting and sound equipment was installed in 2005.

=== UpStage Theatre ===
Upstage Theatre was a performing arts tenant at Lambert Hall from December 2005 until August 2015.

In December 2005, UpStage Theatre produced its first show at Lambert Hall with the original holiday musical, Santa's Magic Timepiece. UpStage, founded in 2000, launched a full season of Evening and Young Audience Series productions in 2006 and adopted Lambert Hall as its new home.

UpStage produced classics such as The Sunshine Boys, Plaza Suite, The Odd Couple; musical delights such as Buddy, The Buddy Holly Story and Back to the 80's; and children's entertainment with Cinderella, Hans Christian Andersen, and Too Many Beagles!.

=== Houston Saengerbund ===
Since 2021, Lambert has been owned by the Houston Saengerbund, which operates Lambert Hall as part of its Saengerhof, consisting of Bierkeller, Biergarten, and the Saengerhalle (the former Heights Christian Church building).

=== Coffee House Houston ===
Coffee House Houston moved to Lambert Hall in early 2026.
