= Favorite Poem Project =

The Favorite Poem Project was founded in 1997 by Robert Pinsky shortly after he was appointed 39th Poet Laureate of the United States by the Library of Congress. During the one-year open call for submissions, 18,000 Americans wrote to the project volunteering to share their favorite poems. Submissions came from people from ages 5 to 97, from every state, of diverse occupations, education and backgrounds.

The project has prompted hundreds of Favorite Poem readings in cities and towns across the country. These events gather individuals from different corners of a single community to share their favorite poems with each other, revealing personal ties to specific poems.

With the Boston University School of Education, the project has hosted five week-long summer poetry institutes for educators. Led by Pinsky, the institutes emphasize vocal and personal connections as a starting point for more intense study of poems. Additional faculty have included Frank Bidart, Mark Doty, David Ferry, Louise Glück, Gail Mazur, Heather McHugh and Rosanna Warren.

The Favorite Poem Project's archives include original letters, e-mail printouts, and both raw and edited versions of audio and video recordings. The archives are housed by Boston University's Mugar Library, at the Howard Gotlieb Archival Research Center. These materials, along with the project's database of nearly 25,000 letters written by American readers, are used by scholars and researchers. Production of the Favorite Poem Project video anthology was overseen by executive producer Juanita Anderson. Video directors include Juanita Anderson, Natatcha Estébanez, Emiko Omori, d.b.Roderick, Debra Farrar-Parkman and Maria Theresa Rodriguez. Final versions of the fifty Favorite Poem Project videos are kept at the Library of Congress Archive of Recorded Poetry & Literature.
