= Opera in the Heights =

Opera company in Houston, Texas

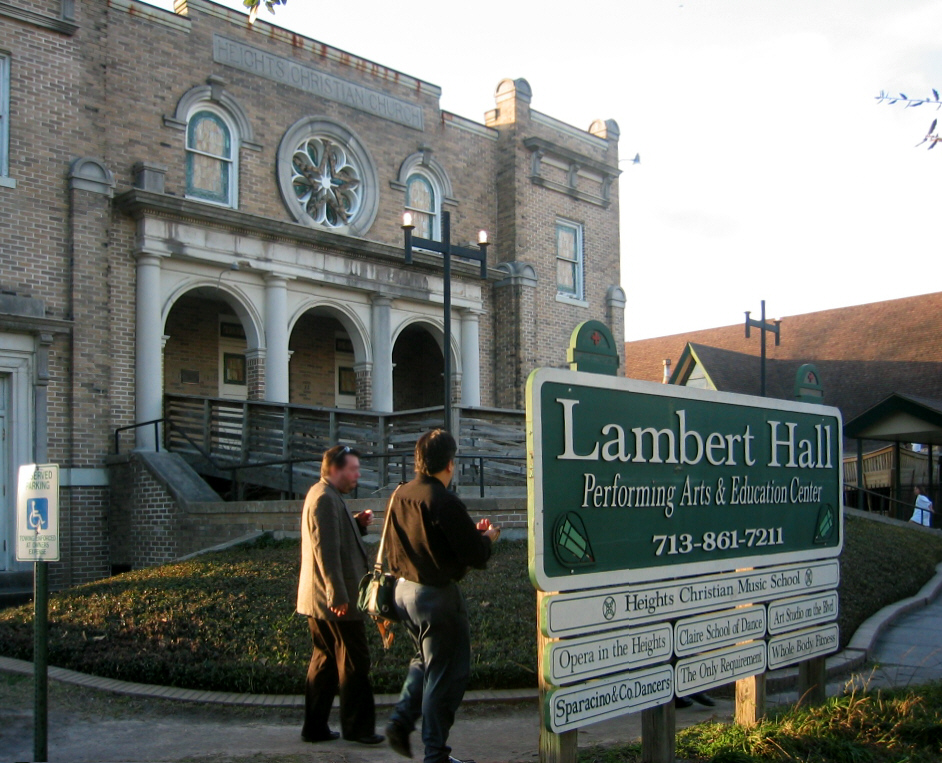
Lambert Hall, home of Opera in the Heights, in 2003

Opera in the Heights is a non-profit, regional opera company, which is housed in the historic Lambert Hall at 1703 Heights Boulevard in Houston, Texas.

== History ==
Opera in the Heights held its first Gala Opera Evening, a Fledermaus Party, in Lambert Hall on April 12, 1996. A few days later, an arsonist set fire to Lambert Hall, having poured flammables onto the piano and the backstage storage. A neighbor saw the fire in the early morning, and called the fire department, which arrived in minutes and saved the building.

Opera in the Heights held its next performance, a Gala II Concert, on May 11, 1996, with curtains hanging over fire-damaged walls. Clean-up from the fire was financed by this benefit concert, a dinner party, and the generosity of company members and neighbors.

== See also ==
- Houston Heights, Houston, Texas
