= Theatre Suburbia =

Community theatre in Houston, Texas

Coordinates: 29.8321°N 95.5000°W

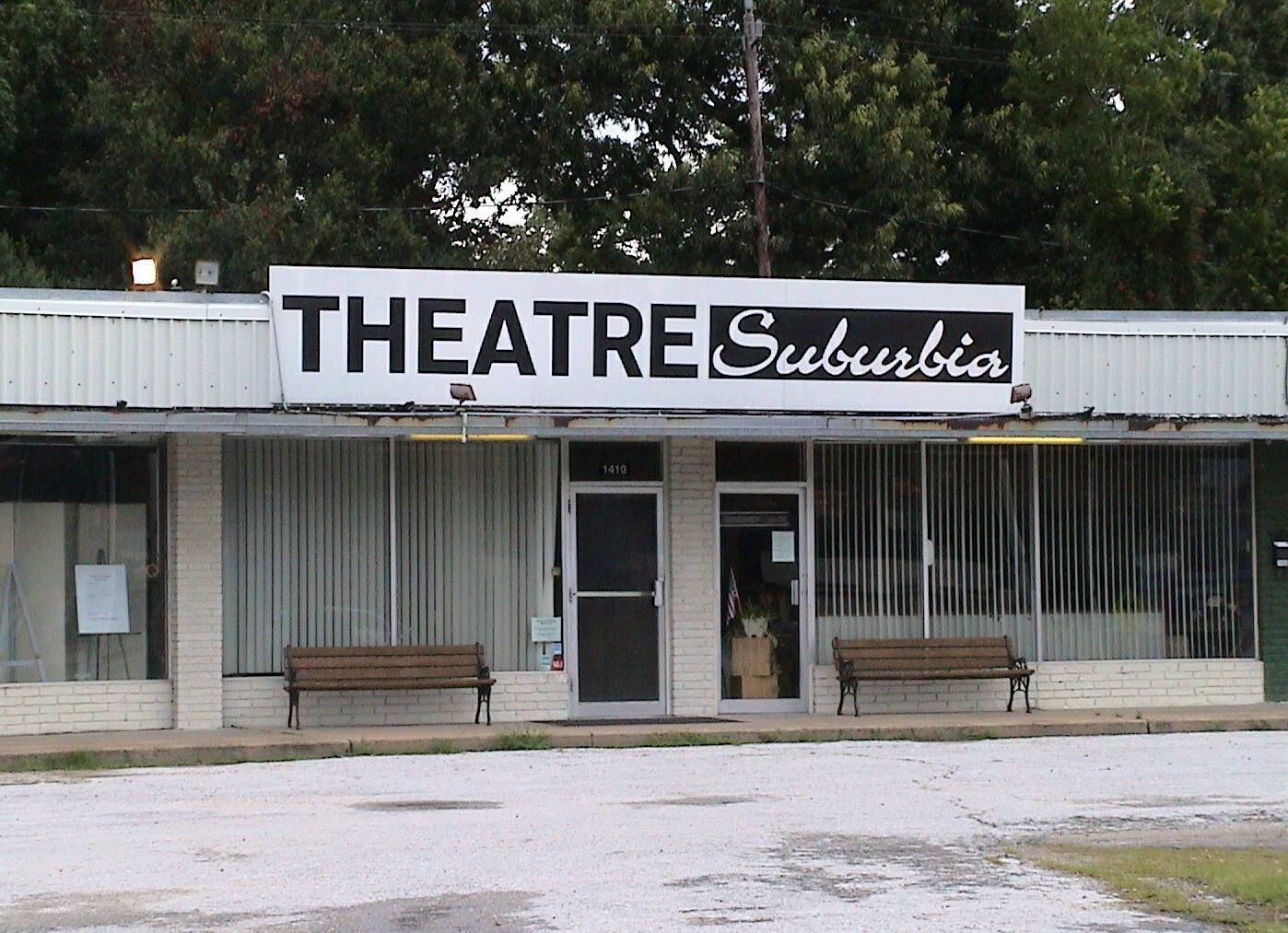
The former Theatre Suburbia building in Oak Forest

Theatre Suburbia is a non-profit community theatre company in northwest Houston, Texas. The company is the city's longest running all-volunteer playhouse, having presented a full season of performances every year since 1961.

== History ==
Theatre Suburbia was formed in the summer of 1961 and opened its inaugural season with Philip Barry's, The Philadelphia Story on October 27, 1961. Tickets for the first show sold for $1.50 and the original building at 1410 W 43rd Street would not get air conditioning until its second season. The theatre remained on 43rd Street until 2008, when the theatre moved to a modern facility at 4106 Way Out West Drive. In 2020 the theatre moved to 5201 Mitchelldale Street, where it can be found today.

== Program ==
Theatre Suburbia produces a 7-show season of modern classics, dramas, comedies and new plays. The annual season runs from September through August. A typical season includes a mystery (often a classic Sherlock Holmes or Agatha Christie favorite), a Christmas holiday production, a play with a distinctive Texas theme or voice, a comedy, and a melodrama.

Developing a strong local theatre community is a cornerstone of Theatre Suburbia's program. An effort is made to showcase at least one play by a playwright from within the local regional community. The theatre hosts an annual script contest in which prospective playwrights can submit an original script to be considered for the summer production. Several first-time playwrights have had their scripts produced on stage at Theatre Suburbia and then gone on to have their plays published or performed at other theatres.

== Melodrama ==
Theatre Suburbia's annual production of a classic melodrama sets it apart from other community theatre companies. Every summer the company produces a classic melodrama.

Elements of a classic melodrama include a plot-driven story with exaggerated stereotypical characters (invariably including a virtuous victim, an unequivocally evil villain, and a larger-than-life hero). Dialog is usually exaggerated, augmented by straightforward plot devices. Melodramas, while popular in the 19th century, are seldom taken seriously by modern dramatists. More often, they are lampooned (or simply left to Dudley-Do-Right cartoons).

In the hands of Theatre Suburbia's directors and actors, the melodrama takes on a very Texas style and flavor. Western frontier themes are favored in the scripts and wholesome hometown cowboys are typically the preferred hero.

Theatre Suburbia calls its melodramas "summer mellerdramas", and for more than four decades, they have proven to be the most popular productions of the year among local Houston audiences. Additional weekend matinees augment the summertime schedule to better accommodate families with young children. Before each show, the audience is provided with tips for interacting with the performers: cheer for the hero, boo the villain, and always feel free to throw handfuls of popcorn anytime the villain should venture too close to the audience.
