= Shadow of the Dragon =

Shadow of the Dragon may refer to:

- Shadow of the Dragon (Cameron novel), a 2020 Jack Ryan novel by Marc Cameron
- Shadow of the Dragon (Garland novel), a 1993 novel by Sherry Garland
- Shadow of the Dragon: Kira, a 2008 children's novel by Kate O'Hearn
