= Kate O'Hearn =

Canadian children's writer

- Born: Kate O'Hearn; Toronto, Ontario, Canada
- Occupation: Novelist
- Writing career
- Language: English
- Period: 2008–present
- Genres: Children's literature; fantasy; mythology
- Notable works: Pegasus series; Valkyrie trilogy; Titans series
- Website: kateohearn.com

Kate O'Hearn is a Canadian children's fantasy writer, best known for the Pegasus, Titans and Valkyrie series. O'Hearn published her first book, Shadow of the Dragon: Kira in 2008, which led to a series of books.

== Life and career ==
O'Hearn was born in Toronto, Canada, and had three brothers. She was raised mostly in New York City, although she would live in other places in between. She and her family travelled a lot, and during these travels, she was exposed to different cultures that fuelled her imagination and inspired her to start writing. O'Hearn also studied fashion at school, and liked Greek mythology - specifically Pegasus - as a child. While she was growing up, her environments would become the inspiration for her series. For example, she would imagine that Pegasus landed on her roof during a thunderstorm in New York City (Pegasus), or that she was living amongst the whales in the sea, while at the beach (Herm's Secret).

After leaving school, O'Hearn went back to New York and into the fashion industry. However, she wasn't satisfied with her life, and so she went to Europe and split her time between England and France. Wanting to stay away from the fashion industry, she got into film production, one of her loves. However, this didn't work out, and she missed out on a prestigious position on a major film. Sometime after this, she decided to get into writing, with the encouragement of her mother. She entered a story into a contest, but it didn't win, but that didn't deter her. When one of her stories got into a magazine, it was then that she decided to become a writer, full-time.

In 2008, O'Hearn published Shadow of the Dragon: Kira. A few months later, she wrote a short-story in Wow! 366. In 2010, she published Shadow of the Dragon: Elspeth, the sequel to the 2008 book, and she also published Herm's Secret, a standalone novel. In 2011, O'Hearn published the first book of the Pegasus series: Pegasus and the Flame. A few months later, she released the second book in the Pegasus series: Pegasus and the Fight for Olympus. In 2012, she published the third Pegasus book: Pegasus and the New Olympians, and a few months later, the fourth book: Pegasus and the Origins of Olympus. In 2013, O'Hearn released the first book in the Valkyrie trilogy: Valkyrie. A few months later, she wrote a Pegasus short-story in Animal Writes: An Anthology of Animal Tales, called Pegasus and the Jack-in-the-Green. In 2014, she released the second book in the Valkyrie series: The Runaway. In 2015, she released the fifth Pegasus book: Pegasus and the Rise of the Titans, and in 2016, she published the third and final book of the Valkyrie series: War of the Realms. In 2016, she released the sixth and final book in the Pegasus series: Pegasus and the End of Olympus. In 2019, O'Hearn published the first book in Titans, the sequel series to Pegasus, called Titans. In 2020, she released the second book in the Titans series: The Missing. In mid-2021, O'Hearn published the third and final book in the Titans series: The Fallen Queen, and at the end of the same year, published the first book in her Atlantis series, named Escape from Atlantis.

== Published books ==
=== Shadow of the Dragon ===
- Book 1: Shadow of the Dragon: Kira (Published in 2008)
- Book 2: Shadow of the Dragon: Elspeth (Published in 2010)

=== Pegasus ===
- Book 1: U.K title: Pegasus and the Flame (Published in 2011) U.S title: The Flame of Olympus (Published in 2012)
- Book 2: U.K title: Pegasus and the Fight for Olympus (Published in 2011) U.S title: Olympus at War (Published in 2013)
- Book 3: Pegasus and the New Olympians (U.K title published in 2012) (U.S title published in 2014)
- Book 4: Pegasus and the Origins of Olympus (U.K title published in 2012) (U.S title published in 2014)
- Book 5: Pegasus and the Rise of the Titans (Published in 2015)
- Book 6: Pegasus and the End Of Olympus (U.K title published in 2017) (U.S title published in 2016)

==== Other ====
- Animal Writes: An Anthology of Animal Tales (Published in 2013) (O'Hearn wrote a Pegasus short-story in it called Pegasus and the Jack-in-the-Green)

=== Valkyrie ===
- Book 1: Valkyrie (U.K title published in 2013) (U.S title published in 2016)
- Book 2: The Runaway (U.K title published in 2014) (U.S title published in 2017)
- Book 3: War Of The Realms (U.K title published in 2016) (U.S title published in 2018)

=== Titans ===
- Book 1: Titans (Published in 2019)
- Book 2: The Missing (Published in 2020)
- Book 3: The Fallen Queen (Published in 2021)

=== Atlantis ===
- Book 1: Escape from Atlantis (Published in 2021)
- Book 2: Return to Atlantis (Published in 2023)
- Book 3: Secrets of Atlantis (Published in 2023)

=== Other ===
- Wow! 366 (Published in 2008) (O'Hearn wrote a short-story in it)
- Herm's Secret (Published in 2010)
