= History of Vietnamese Americans in Houston =

Ethnic group's local history

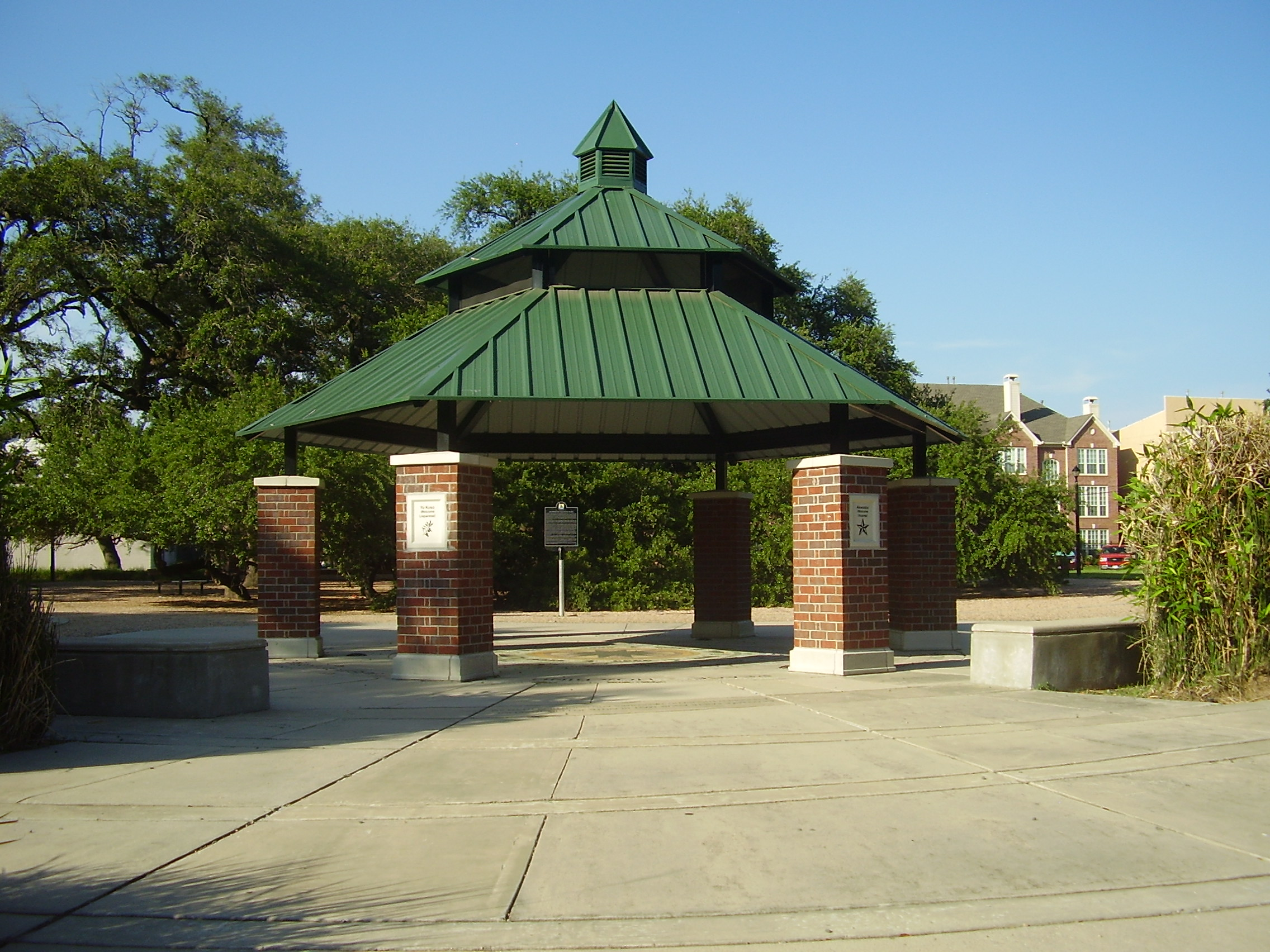
Vietnamese culture memorial at Baldwin Park in Midtown

Vietnamese immigration has occurred in Greater Houston, including Fort Bend County and Harris County, since 1975, after the Vietnam War ended and refugees began coming to the United States.

== History ==
=== 1970s through 1990s ===
In early 1975, fewer than 100 ethnic Vietnamese lived in Greater Houston. They included thirty to fifty students, twenty to forty wives of former U.S. servicemen, and some teachers. The first wave of immigration arrived in Houston after the end of the Vietnam War, when Saigon fell to the North Vietnamese on April 30, 1975. Thousands of Vietnamese people who had affiliations to the South Vietnamese government fled Vietnam. The first wave consisted of a higher proportion of managers and professionals and a smaller proportion of blue-collar workers than the average population of Vietnam. Douglas Pike, a historian, said that the people were "urban, upper class, well-educated, and familiar with American lifestyles." Many Vietnamese were flown to Fort Chaffee, Arkansas, before being transferred to Houston.

The federal refugee resettlement system established by the Indochinese Assistance and Refugee Assistance Act of 1975, which was active from 1975 to 1988, designated Houston as a major resettling site for Vietnamese. Texas received many Vietnamese refugees in the late 1970s because it had a warm climate, an expanding economy, and a location in proximity to the ocean. Vietnamese from fishing and shrimping backgrounds saw Houston as a good settlement point due to its proximity to the Gulf of Mexico. The first wave, compared to the later two waves, was more highly educated, had more knowledge about American society, and had relatively more capital. Because, at that time, the American population felt "war guilt", the first wave received a more positive reception than the other two waves.

With the Vietnamese immigrant waves after the Vietnam War, the U.S. government provided housing, health care, transportation, welfare assistance, initial education, and job training. Nestor Rodriguez, author of "Hispanic and Asian Immigration Waves in Houston", wrote that the "majority of credit" for successfully resettling Vietnamese and Indochinese in Houston was given to charitable and religious organizations and individuals. The tasks the organizations and individuals did included acquainting refugees with the culture of the United States, and assistance in finding jobs and housing for them. Private organizations such as Catholic Charities, Protestant groups and congregations, International Rescue Committee, Jewish groups and congregations, and the YMCA provided assistance to refugees. Sometimes private organizations received assistance from the government. In the 1970s thousands of Vietnamese refugees moved to Allen Parkway Village, where they encountered crime and tensions with existing black residents. In areas in Greater Houston along the Gulf Coast some white residents had animosity towards Vietnamese fishermen. Around the late 1970s in Seabrook, Texas, a Ku Klux Klan group held an anti-Vietnamese rally, and in an incident two Vietnamese fishing boats were burned.

The second wave consisted of "boat people" who came from 1978 to 1982. They were socioeconomically poorer than the first wave, and their children did not have as high of a performance in academics as the children of the first-wave immigrants had. Stephen Klineberg, a sociologist, said that of the Vietnamese that received Asian surveys, 47% completed the interviews in Vietnamese. Many members of the second wave were Vietnamese of Chinese descent. As of June 2, 1980, the Vietnamese had become a significant ethnic minority in the area. With about 25,000 Vietnamese at that time, Greater Houston had the second highest Vietnamese population in the United States, after Greater Los Angeles. Of the Vietnamese not born in the United States, 11 persons had entered the U.S. before 1950, while 95% of the number of foreign-born Vietnamese had entered the U.S. since 1975. Many of the Vietnamese refugees in Houston had experienced trauma in their journeys to the U.S. and had experienced problems with families and personal issues after settling in the United States. Out of 114 Vietnamese women who were a part of a late 1980s study of refugee women in Houston, the majority reported having problems with family, finances, and/or health and/or reported being depressed, nervous, and/or anxious.

Demand for use of Vietnamese-speaking officers of the Houston Police Department (HPD) increased in the 1980s as the city's Vietnamese population increased.

The third wave consisted of former political prisoners and detainees from Vietnam. In 1988 the Vietnamese government began releasing political prisoners and detainees en masse after U.S. government intervention. The political prisoners had mental and physical illnesses due to imprisonment, and they had the most difficult time fitting in to the United States. In 1990 in Greater Houston there were 33,000 ethnic Vietnamese, including those born in the United States and those born abroad. Within the city of Houston, that year there were 18,453 ethnic Vietnamese, with 84% of them being born outside of the United States. As of 1990 the Vietnamese, along with the Chinese, were one of the two largest Asian immigrant groups to Houston, with 15,568 Vietnamese living there. Rodriguez wrote that because the Vietnamese started building their institutions in Houston in the 1970s while the Chinese had already been established in Houston, "the Vietnamese in the Houston area have not reached the same level of mainstream incorporation in the late 1990s that the Chinese have."

By December 1991 over 60,000 Vietnamese persons resided in Houston.

=== 2000s and beyond ===
The Vietnamese coming into Houston in the 2000s and beyond came to find education and jobs.

In 2005 Houston had 32,000 Vietnamese and Vietnamese Americans, making it the second largest Vietnamese American community in the United States of any city after that of San Jose, California. In 2006 Greater Houston had around 58,000 Vietnamese and Vietnamese Americans, giving it the third largest such community of all U.S. metropolitan areas. By 2007 many Vietnamese Americans in Southern California were moving to Texas to take advantage of lower costs of living.

Around 2008, the Government of Vietnam proposed installing a consulate within Houston. Members of the Vietnamese-American community in Houston protested against the plan, arguing that the current Vietnamese government had a bad human rights record and had no democracy, so the installation of the consulate should not be allowed. The governments of the U.S. and Vietnam officially agreed to open the Consulate-General of Vietnam in Houston in August 2009, and the consulate held its official inauguration on March 25, 2010.

In 2020 a local man named Lê Hoàng Nguyên put up a bilingual English-Vietnamese billboard promoting the Black Lives Matter movement. In response he received death threats. Others decided to start boycotting businesses owned by Lê Hoàng Nguyên. Dan Q. Dao of Texas Monthly wrote that "had instantly become a flashpoint within the community". The sign is in the southwest Houston Chinatown.

== Demographics ==
As of the 2010 U.S. Census, Harris County had 80,409 ethnic Vietnamese, making up 28.7% of the Asians in the county. As of the same year, 15% of the Asians in Fort Bend County were of Vietnamese origins, making them the third largest Asian ethnic group in the county.

In 1990 there were 31,056 ethnic Vietnamese in Harris County, making up 28.3% of the county's Asians. By 1990 the Vietnamese became the largest Asian ethnic group in the county. In 2000 the Vietnamese population in the county was 55,489, 28.7% of the Asians in the county. From 2000 to 2010 the Vietnamese population in Harris County grew by 45%.

== Geography ==
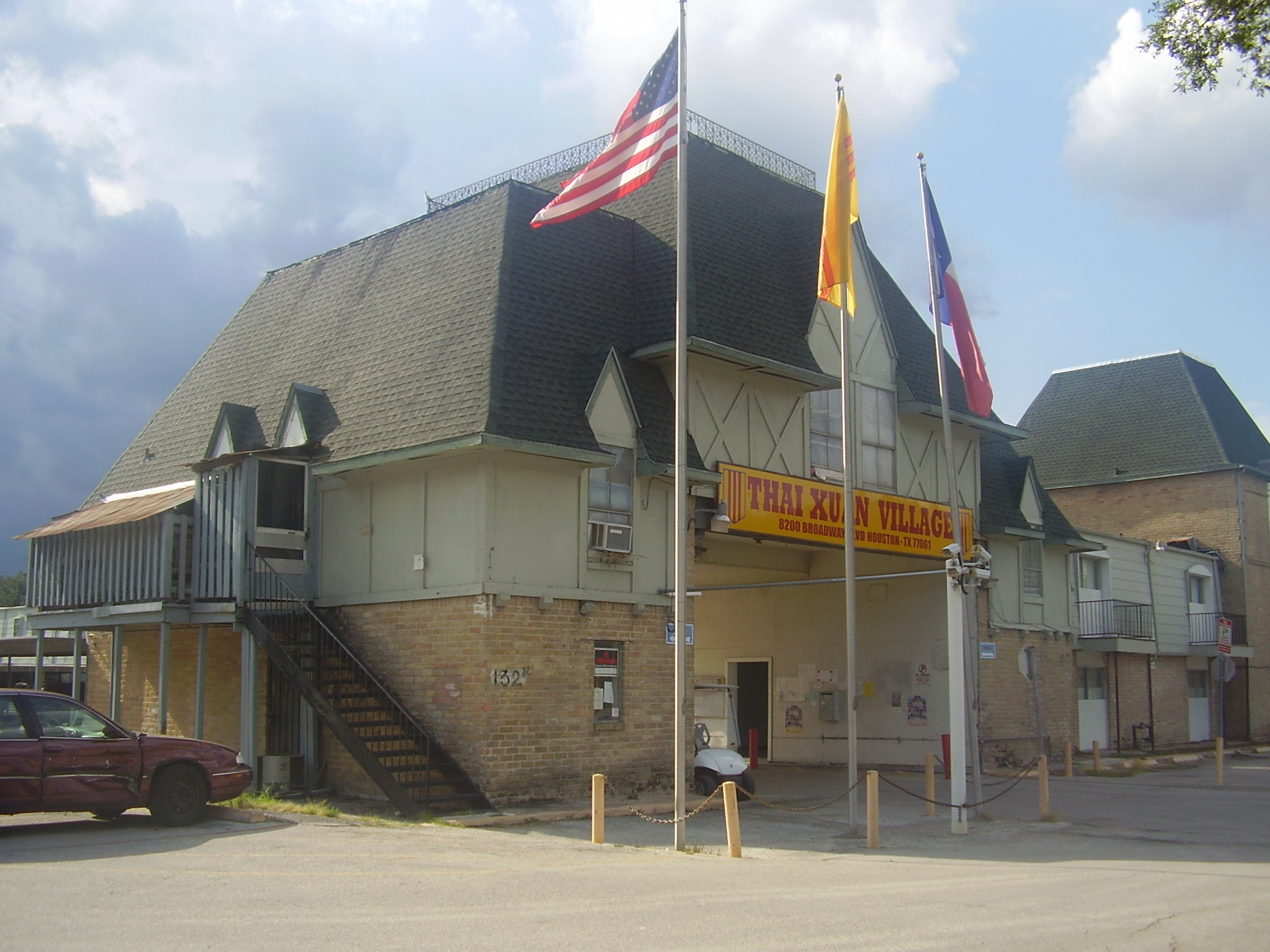
Thai Xuan Village in Southeast Houston

As of 2006, the largest concentrations of Vietnamese immigrants and Vietnamese Americans are on the southwest, northwest, and southeast sides of Houston, with the southwest side having the largest concentration and the northwest having the second largest. In Southwest Houston, the major Vietnamese business centers are located on Bellaire Boulevard and the surrounding areas, in the new Houston Chinatown. The area includes hundreds of Vietnamese businesses, including churches, community centers, grocery stores, investor offices, legal offices, medical offices, realtor offices, temples, and Vietnamese restaurants.

Historical Vietnamese business districts include one in the western end of the old Chinatown in East Downtown and one in Midtown. The Midtown one, with 18 square blocks, is located south of Downtown, and between Downtown and Montrose.

Of Vietnamese immigrants of the third wave of immigration, as of 2006 many lived in specific multifamily "village" complexes. The complexes include Thai Xuan Village, Da Lat Village, Hue Village, Saigon Village, St. Joseph Village, St. Mary Village, and Thanh Tam Village. Of the larger villages, five are on Broadway Street and Park Place Boulevard in southeast Houston.

== Areas of Vietnamese settlement ==
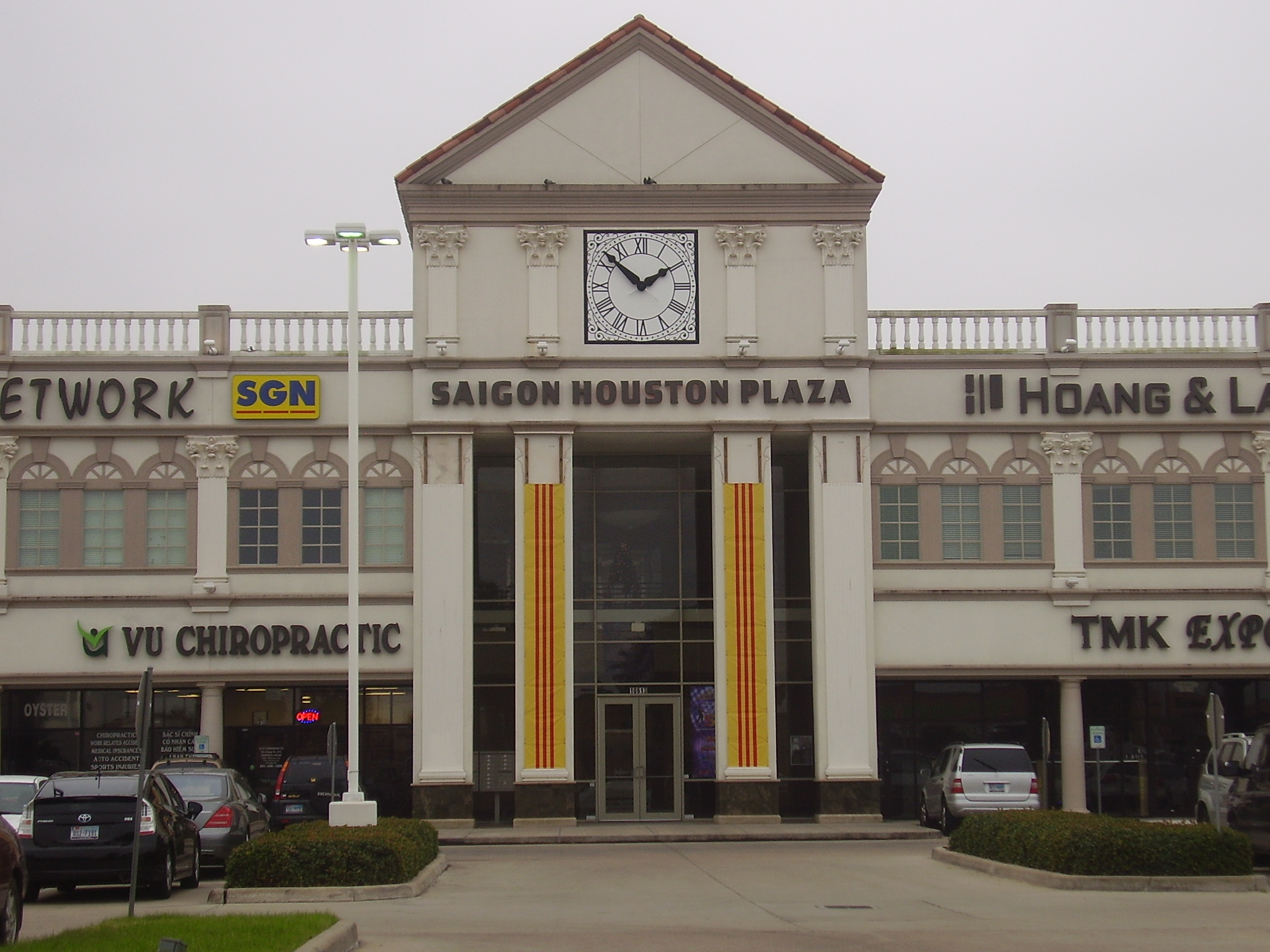
Saigon Plaza in the new Little Saigon

The original Vietnamese area in Houston, "Vinatown", was established next to the George R. Brown Convention Center, in proximity to the Old Chinatown.

By the end of the 1980s, the Vietnamese businesses had moved to Milam Street in what is now Midtown. This area became known as "Vietnamtown". Vietnamese in Houston, in the 1970s, had settled Allen Parkway Village. Midtown was in proximity and was relatively inexpensive. Midtown became a center of business and religion for ethnic Vietnamese across the Houston area even though very few ethnic Vietnamese actually resided in Midtown. By 1991 this Little Saigon had Vietnamese restaurants, hair salons, car shops, and travel agencies, and as of 2000 businesses there included grocery stores, medical and legal offices, restaurants, music and video stores, hair styling shops, business service offices, and jewelry stores. Mimi Swartz of Texas Monthly stated in 1991 that in what is now Midtown, "Little Saigon is a place to begin easing into a new country." Due to the actions of a group of Vietnamese-American leaders led by My Michael Cao, who served as the President of the Vietnamese Community of Houston and Vicinity (VNCH), a resolution that installed Vietnamese street signs along Milam Street in Midtown was passed. Vietnamese street signs have denoted the area since 1998. In 2004, this area was officially named "Little Saigon" by the city of Houston. The redevelopment of Midtown Houston from run-down to upscale increased property values and property taxes, forcing many Vietnamese-American businesses out of the neighborhood into other areas. By 2003 the number of Vietnamese business declined, with many of them moving to the Southwest Houston Little Saigon, despite the beautification projects occurring. Hope Roth stated circa 2017 that pressure from other new developments and increase in costs related to land and space caused a decline in Little Saigon. Roth stated that many of the area restaurants still remain, but increasingly cater more to mainstream American tastes. In 2010 Denny Lee of The New York Times wrote that "traces" of the Vietnamese community remained.

The largest Vietnamese commercial district is now found in suburban Alief, along Bellaire Boulevard west of the city of Bellaire, with Vietnamese-owned businesses and restaurants concentrated between Texas State Highway Beltway 8 and South Kirkwood Road.

Although the area today is now known simply as Chinatown to most Houstonians, locals still call this southwest area of Houston "Bellaire". The city of Houston has formally renamed the area the International District (Greater Houston). Although the area is primarily Vietnamese and Chinese, there are also large numbers of Filipino Americans, Arab Americans, Indonesian Americans, and Pakistani Americans in the area, as well as a sizable number of African Americans, who were once the majority in the Little Saigon area prior to the Vietnam War.

In 2016 Steve Le, a member of the Houston City Council for District F, proposed creating a "Little Saigon" district, consisting of commercial areas along Bellaire Boulevard from Cook Road to Turtlewood. Some persons in Alief expressed opposition to the idea, saying it was racial segregation, and that the area has more ethnic groups than just Vietnamese.

After the 1970s a group of ethnic Vietnamese moved to southeast Houston in an area within Beltway 8 and along Interstate 45 (Gulf Freeway).

== Economy ==
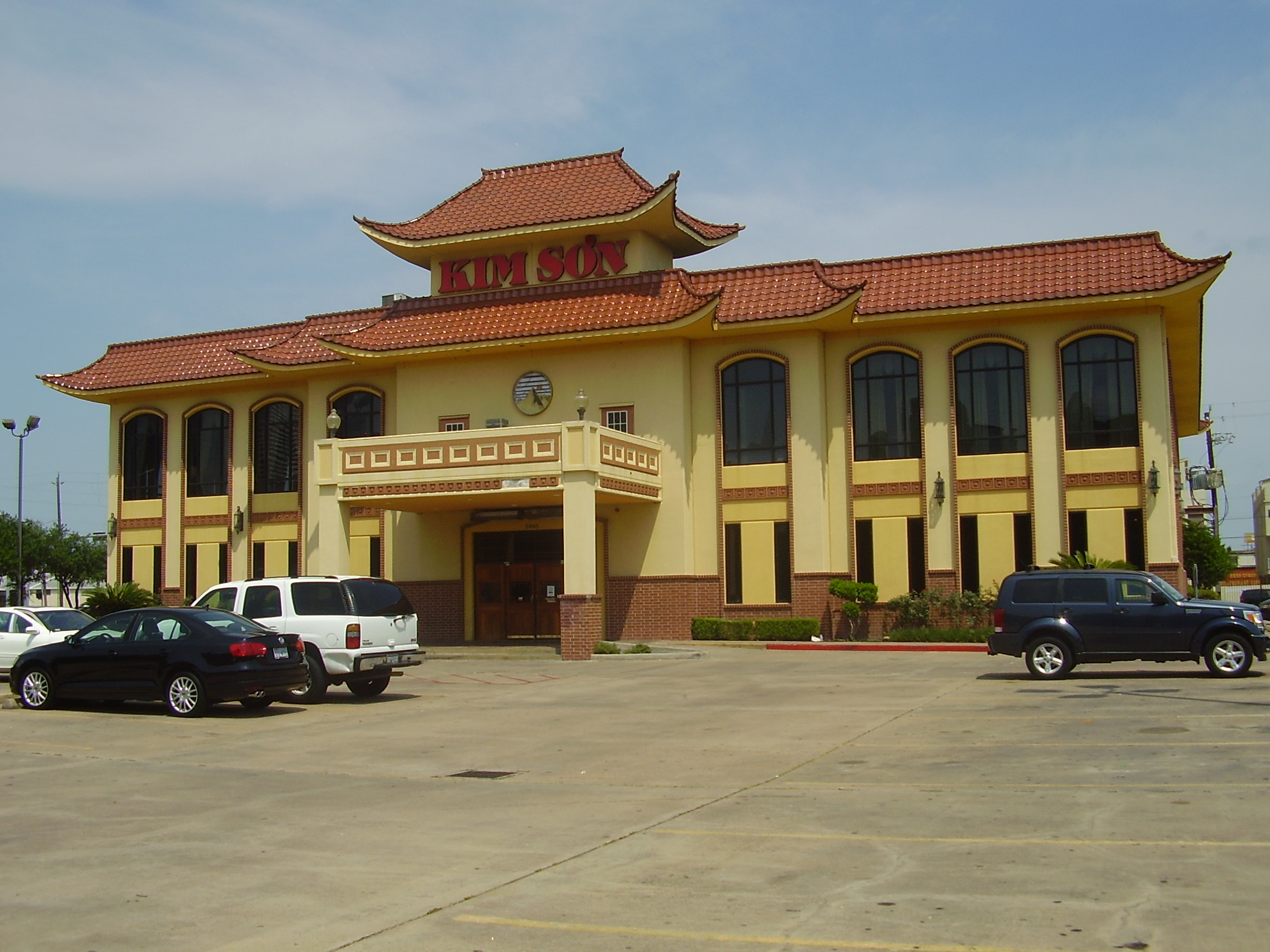
The East Downtown Kim Sơn restaurant

Usually Vietnamese American businesses are located in the same areas that their clients live in.

Immediately after the Vietnam War, many ethnic Vietnamese became shrimpers. Jessica Chew, author of "Vietnamese and Chinese American Cultures: Destination Houston," wrote that "In Houston, the shrimping business acted as a central part of the Vietnamese community, which was familiar with the trade."

In 1990 the median household income of Vietnamese people in Harris County was $22,284. In 1990 18% of Vietnamese workers in Harris County had bachelor's degrees. In 1990, the median income of a Vietnamese household in Fort Bend County was $39,318. During 1990, Vietnamese in Houston had a more numerous presence in craft and manual occupations and a less numerous presence in high-skilled administrative, managerial, and professional occupations than the Chinese did, and the Vietnamese had a greater occupational distribution than the Chinese.

The presence of Vietnamese immigrants led to the development of Vietnamese restaurants throughout Houston. Some establishments from Vietnamese restaurateurs offer Vietnamese-style crawfish, a mixture of Louisiana cuisine and Vietnamese cuisine. Most of the "you buy, we fry" restaurants in Houston are operated by Vietnamese immigrants and Vietnamese Americans. Carl Bankston, an associate professor of Asian studies and sociology at Tulane University, said in 2004 that ethnic Vietnamese were employed in fishing, seafood processing, and shrimping in the Gulf Coast area in high numbers. Around 1974 Vietnamese immigrants began coming to the Gulf Coast to work in the shrimping industry, whence many ethnic Vietnamese entered the fishing trade and related businesses.

== Politics ==
In 1995 ethnic Vietnamese in the Houston area initially had a preference for the Republican Party; this was due to historic Republican support for anti-Communism, as the Vietnamese coming opposed the Vietnamese Communist Party. By 2013, due to concerns about discrimination against Asians and immigration policies and the lessening importance of anti-Communism, the political preferences of ethnic Vietnamese had shifted towards Democrats and independents. In 2020 Vietnamese Americans in Houston were relatively more conservative compared to other Asian ethnic groups. However, worldwide condemnation of Donald Trump and criticism of Vietnamese supporters of Donald Trump have created a generational shear between Vietnamese Americans and their support for particular political parties. With Vietnam itself moving towards more open market and free trade policies despite perceptions of human rights and freedom of press abuse in Vietnam, Vietnamese Americans have become more apolitical and less antagonistic towards the Socialist Republic of Vietnam.

== Education ==
Many Vietnamese who arrived as refugees in the 1970s were given vocational education at Houston Community College. As of 2016, the college system does not require English language proficiency for enrollment. Vietnamese immigrants, among other immigrant groups, continue to benefit from the college's full-time 18-month English proficiency program and remedial courses.

== Cuisine ==
There is Viet Hoa (ethnic Chinese) influence on Vietnamese cuisine served in Houston. Suzanne Chew, mother of Jessica Chew, stated that the situation is a "Chinese mix".

The barbecue at Blood Bros. BBQ in Bellaire has Asian-American influences, with the pitmaster being of Vietnamese ancestry.

== Media ==
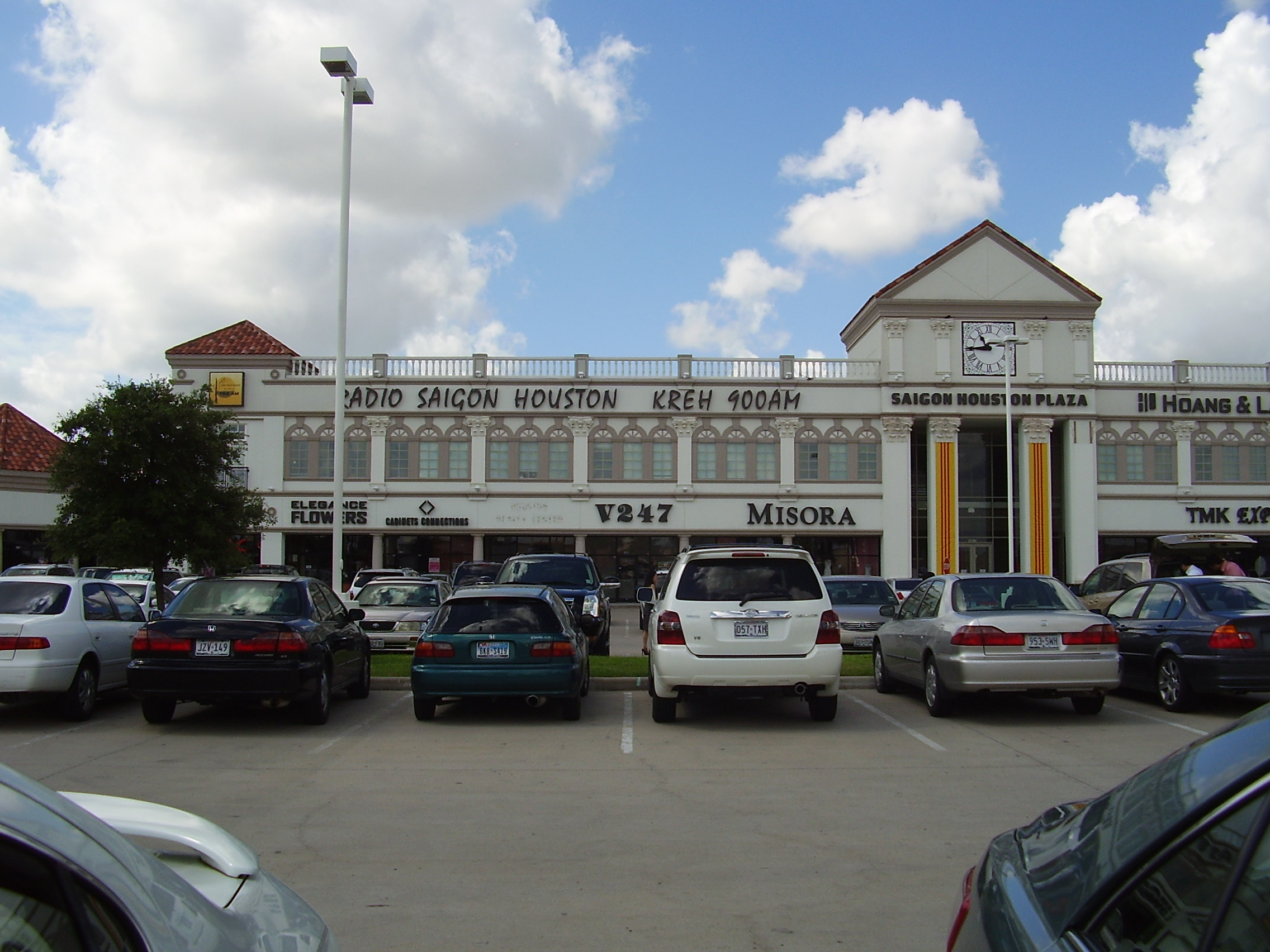
Radio Saigon Houston offices

=== Radio ===
Radio Saigon Houston (KREH) is a Vietnamese radio station co-owned by Duong Phuc and Vu Thanh Thuy. In 2007, it possessed over 80 contributing hosts and 35 employees, including full-time and part-time staff. That year, Cynthia Leonor Garza of the Houston Chronicle stated that the station was a factor in migration of ethnic Vietnamese to Houston from the West Coast.

=== Newspapers ===
The Thoi Bao Houston is a Vietnamese magazine's branch in Houston.

In October 2006 Saigon Houston Weekly, a newspaper of Mass Media Inc., was established.

=== Magazines ===
As of 1991 there was a Vietnamese community magazine called Xay Dung.

Tre Magazine is a Vietnamese language weekly publication, serving the large Vietnamese immigrant community in the U.S. Since its first launch in Houston in 2011, Tre has gained favorable responses from readers and recognition within the community. Tre's circulation is about 8,000 free copies, covering Fort Bend and Harris counties. The publication's headquarters are located in Garland, Texas.

== Religion ==
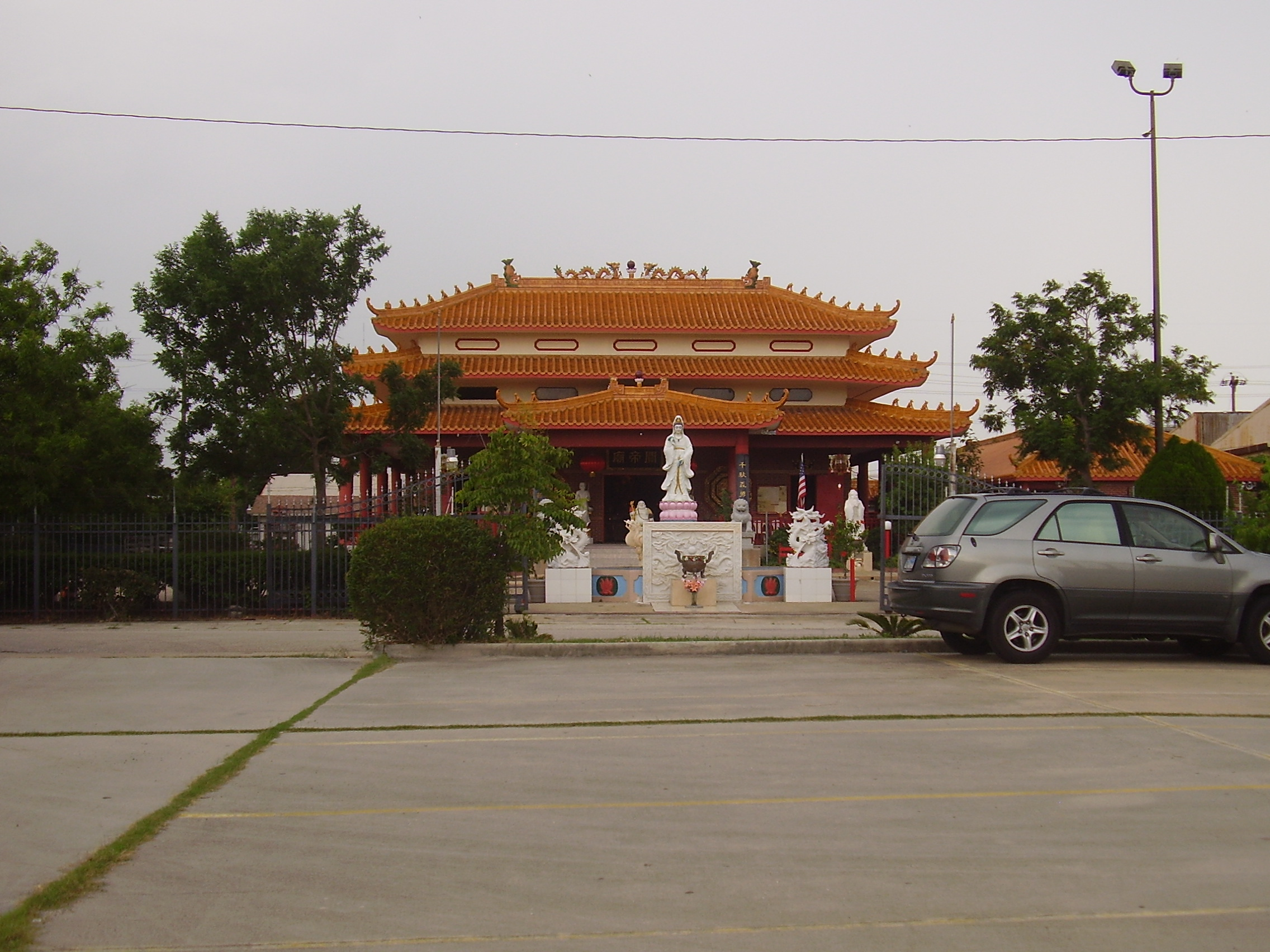
Texas Guandi Temple

The first wave of immigrants was mostly Catholic, but the subsequent waves were mostly Buddhist.

A Taoist temple, Texas Guandi Temple (traditional Chinese: 德州關帝廟; simplified Chinese: 德州关帝庙; pinyin: Dézhōu Guāndì Miào) is located in East Downtown. The temple was established in 1999 by a Vietnamese couple, Charles Loi Ngo and Carolyn, the former originating from China. They decided to build a temple to Guan Yu (Guandi) after surviving an aggravated robbery which occurred at their store in the Fifth Ward. They believed that Guandi saved their lives during the incident. A Vietnamese refugee named Charles Lee coordinated the donations and funding so the temple could be built; Lee stated his motivation was to thank the United States for welcoming him and saving his life when he arrived in 1978. The construction materials and architectural design originated from China. A representation of Buddha and a golden Lord Brahma originated from Thailand. The temple is open to followers of all religions, and it has perfumed halls. Ming Shui Huang was appointed volunteer manager in 2000.

In 1999 the Houston area had about 30,000 ethnic Vietnamese Catholics. Vietnamese Catholic churches in the area include Christ Incarnate Word Parish (Vietnamese: Giáo Xứ Đức Kito Ngôi Lời Nhập Thể), Holy Rosary Parish, Our Lady of Lavang (Giáo Xứ Đức Mẹ Lavang), Our Lady of Lourdes, and Vietnamese Martyrs (Giáo Xứ Các Thánh Tử Đạo Việt Nam). In 1999 there were four Vietnamese Catholic churches and five other churches with large numbers of Vietnamese people. On August 8, 2008, a bus with Vietnamese Catholics from the Houston area, traveling to Missouri to a festival to honor to the Virgin Mary, crashed near Sherman in North Texas. 17 people died.

== Recreation ==
The Lunar New Year (Vietnamese New Year) is celebrated in Houston. KUHT produced a special program on the holiday that aired in 1988.

== In popular culture ==
Sherry Garland wrote the 1993 novel Shadow of the Dragon, which is about a 16-year old Vietnamese boy living in Houston.

== Gallery ==
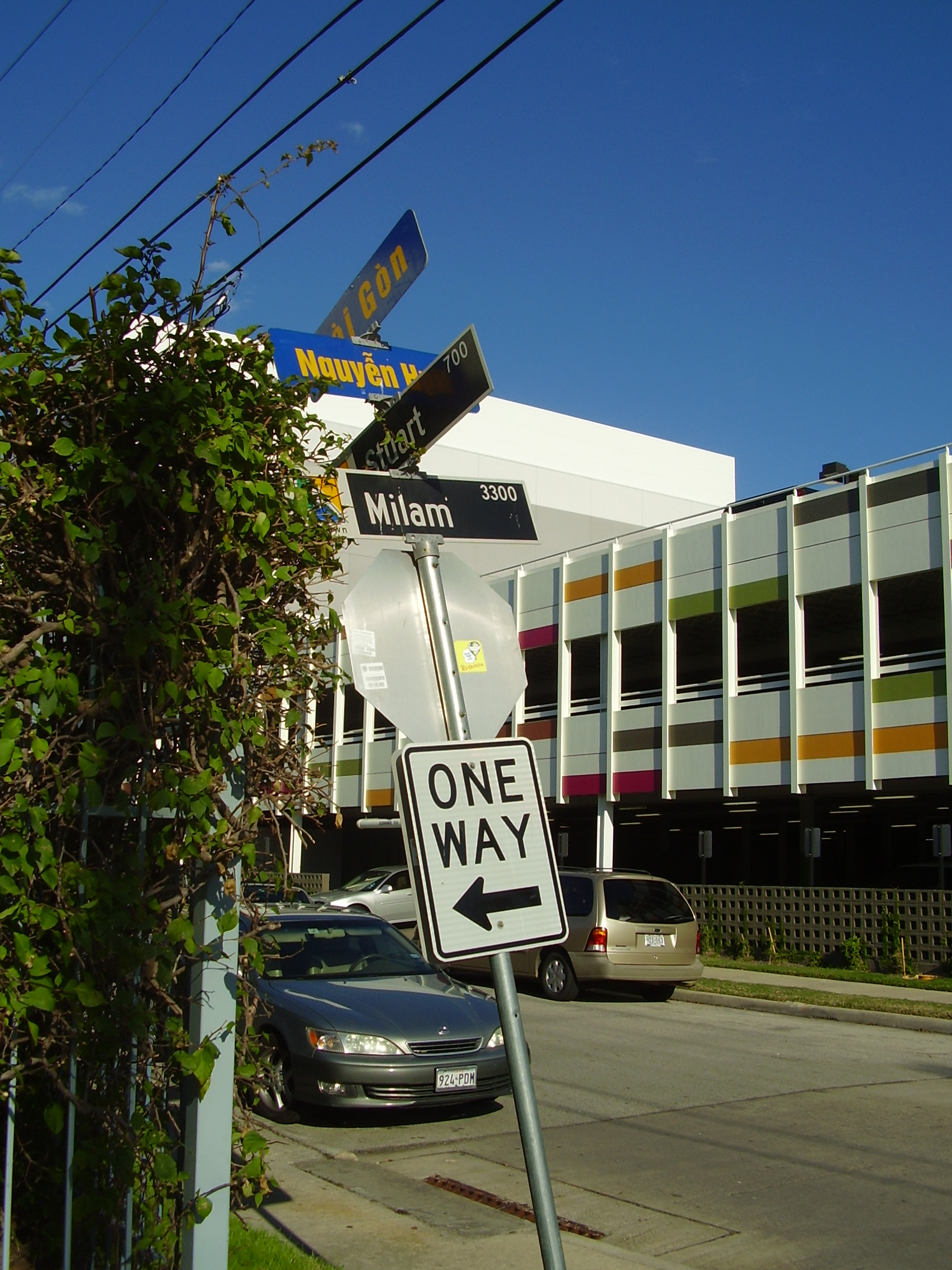
Several streets in the Midtown district have Vietnamese names.

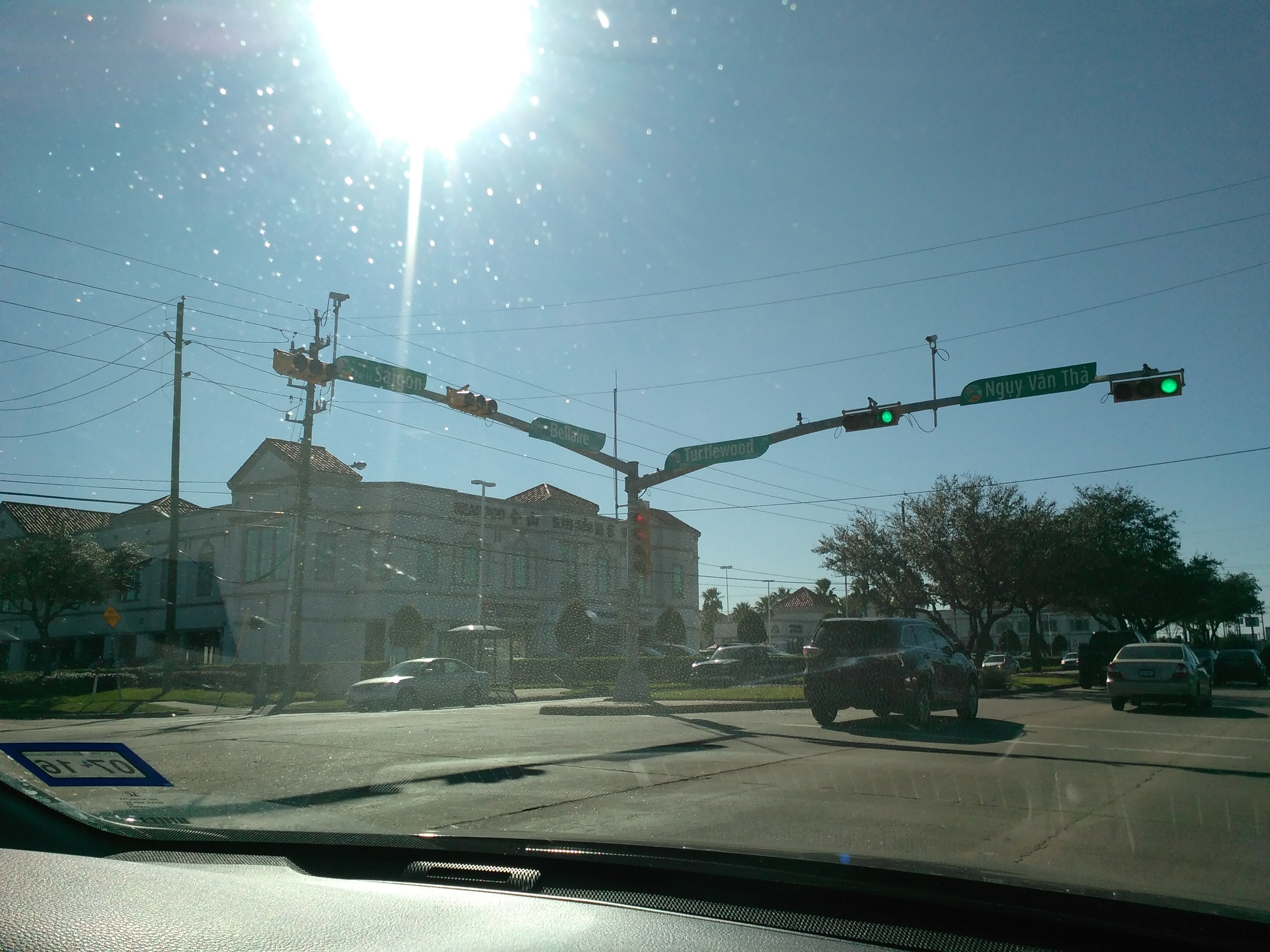
International District signs in Vietnamese along Bellaire Boulevard in the Little Saigon in Houston

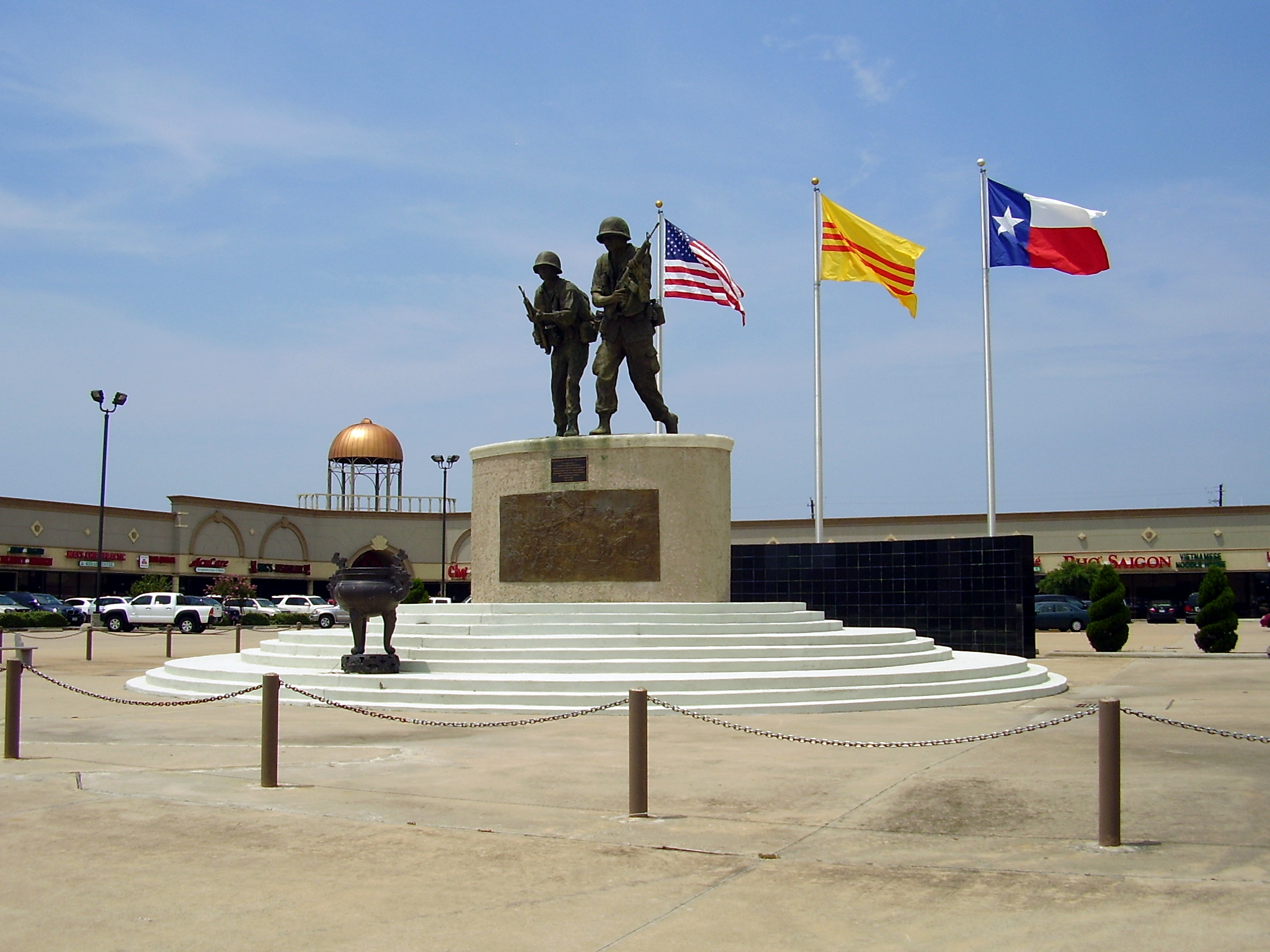
Vietnam War memorial, built in 2012, in the Universal Shopping Center in the new Chinatown

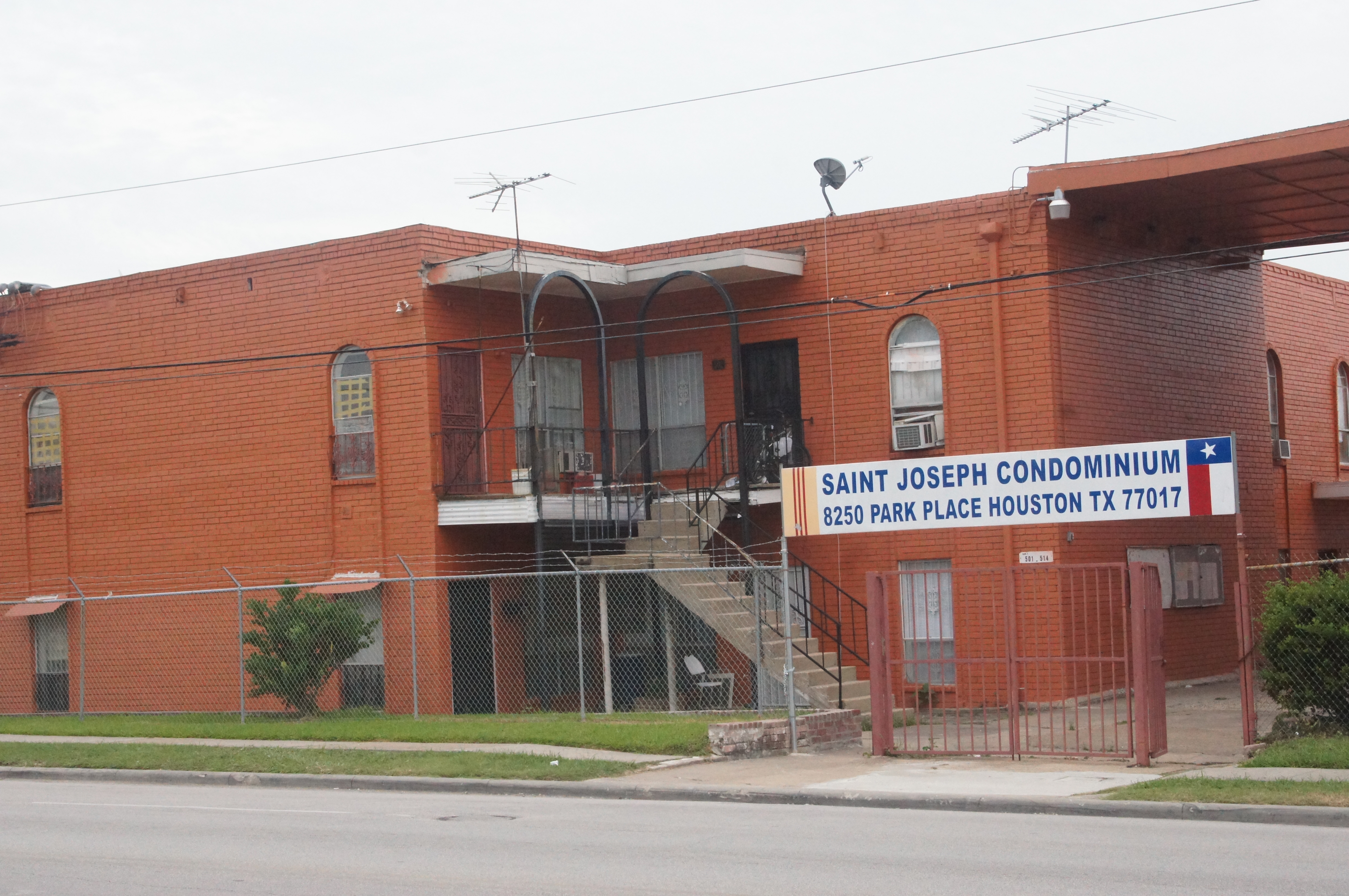
Saint Joseph Condominium in Park Place

== Notable people ==
- Wendy Duong, first Vietnamese American to be appointed judge in the USA
- Christine Hà, chef, writer, and TV host
- Al Hoang, first Vietnamese American in the Houston City Council
- Keshi (Casey Luong), musician
- Chau Nguyen, news reporter
- Hubert Vo, member of the Texas House of Representatives

== See also ==
- Demographics of Houston
- History of Chinese Americans in Houston
- History of Mexican Americans in Houston
- Kim Sơn (restaurant)
- Mai's
- VAN-TV
- Little Saigon, Houston

== Sources ==
- "Asian Americans in Houston: A Kaleidoscope of Cultures" (PDF). Houston History. 13 (1). University of Houston Center for Public History. Fall 2015. - Table of contents
  - Chew, Jessica. "Vietnamese and Chinese American Cultures: Destination Houston" (PDF). Houston History: 21–24.
  - Tomkins-Walsh, Teresa. "Welcome to Guandi's Temple – A Mystic Sanctuary of Asian Cultures in Houston" (PDF). Houston History: 36–39.
- Klineberg, Stephen L. and Jie Wu. "DIVERSITY AND TRANSFORMATION AMONG ASIANS IN HOUSTON: Findings from the Kinder Institute's Houston Area Asian Survey (1995, 2002, 2011)" (Archive). Kinder Institute for Urban Research, Rice University. February 2013.
- Rodriguez, Nestor. "Hispanic and Asian Immigration Waves in Houston." in: Chafetz, Janet Salzman, and Helen Rose Ebaugh (editors), Religion and the New Immigrants: Continuities and Adaptations in Immigrant Congregations. AltaMira Press, October 18, 2000. ISBN 0759117128, 9780759117129.
  - Also available in: Ebaugh, Helen Rose Fuchs, and Janet Saltzman Chafetz (editors). Rowman & Littlefield, January 1, 2000. 0742503909, 9780742503908.
- Vu, Roy. "Constructing a Southern Vietnamese Community and Identity in Houston." (Archive) The Houston Review. University of Houston, 2006. Volume 3, No. 1. p. 27-31, 63-66. Available from ProQuest Dissertations and Theses, 406 p. Alternate link: "From the Ashes of the Cold War: Constructing a Southern Vietnamese Community and Identity in Houston"
