= Sherman, Texas bus accident =

2008 road accident in Texas, US

Details
- Date: August 8, 2008
- Location: Sherman, Texas
- Coordinates: 33.649°N 96.611°W
- Country: United States
- Operator: Iguala BusMex Inc.

Statistics
- Vehicles: 1
- Deaths: 17

The Sherman, Texas bus accident occurred when a bus chartered by Vietnamese pilgrims crashed in Texas on Friday August 8, 2008, killing at least 17 people and injuring dozens more, police said. The bus, carrying 55 people, drove off an overpass bridge of northbound U.S. 75 shortly after midnight and crashed near the town of Sherman, Texas, some 64 mi (103 km) north of Dallas.

Sherman police said a blown tire on the bus may have caused the driver to lose control. Local media said that the group was from the Vietnamese Martyrs' Church, Our Lady of Lavang, and Our Lady of Lourdes of Houston, Texas. The bus was one of three buses carrying Vietnamese Catholics on their way to the annual Marian Days celebration in Carthage, Missouri in honor of the Virgin Mary. The bus tire was apparently recapped; the bus charter company had a history of safety violations, and the driver had a criminal record. The bus owner was identified as Iguala BusMex Inc.

Following the crash, the Federal Motor Carrier Safety Administration temporarily stopped issuing new bus company licenses.

The bus did not have seat belts. Some people have called for mandatory seat belts and safety glass in highway coaches.

== See also ==
- Christianity in Houston
- History of Vietnamese Americans in Houston
