= Little Saigon, Houston =

Neighborhood in Texas, US

Little Saigon
- Neighborhood of Houston
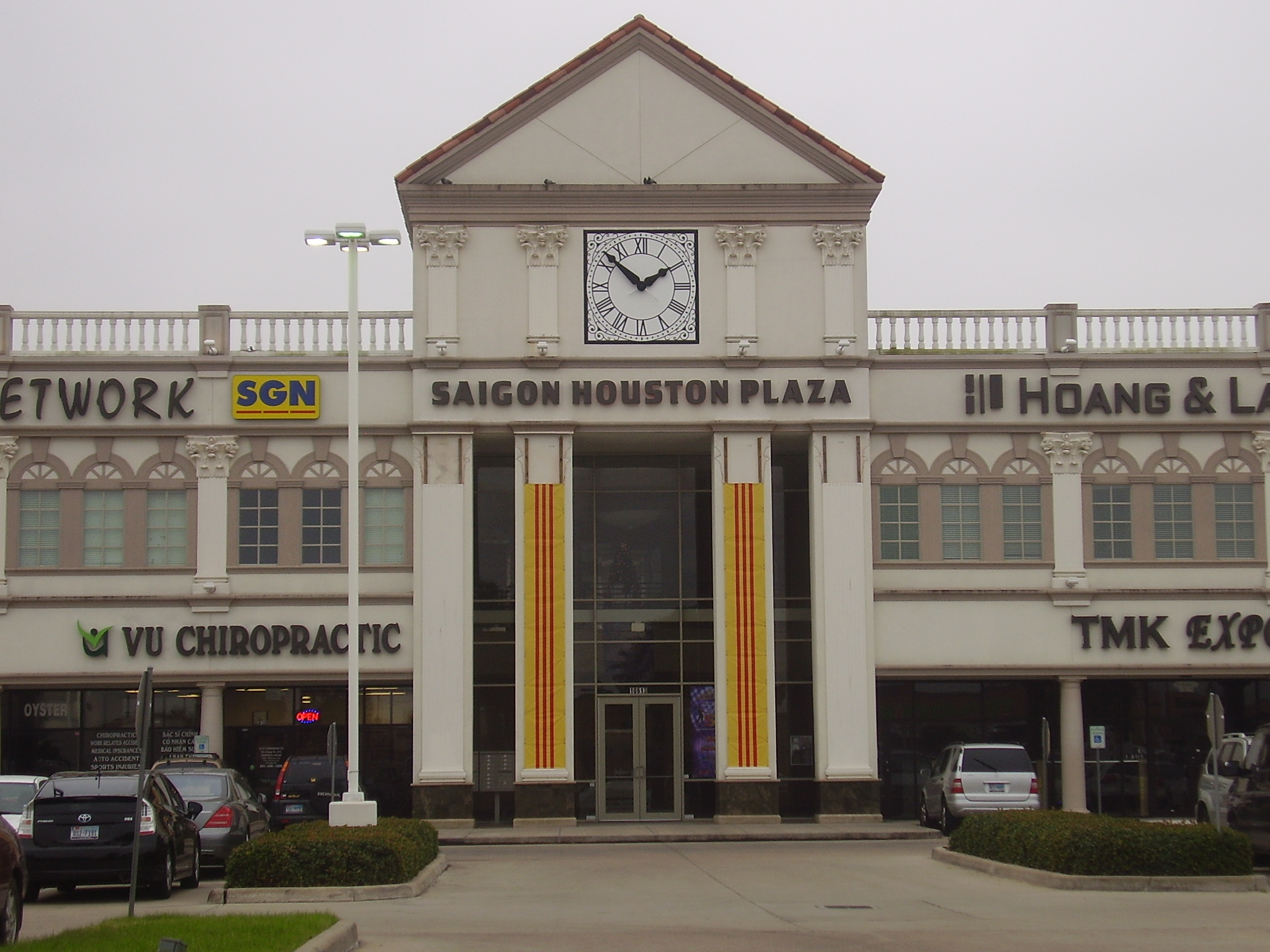
- Saigon Plaza in Little Saigon
- Interactive map of Little Saigon
- Coordinates: 29°42′14.05″N 95°34′16.47″W
- Country: United States of America
- State: Texas
- City: Houston

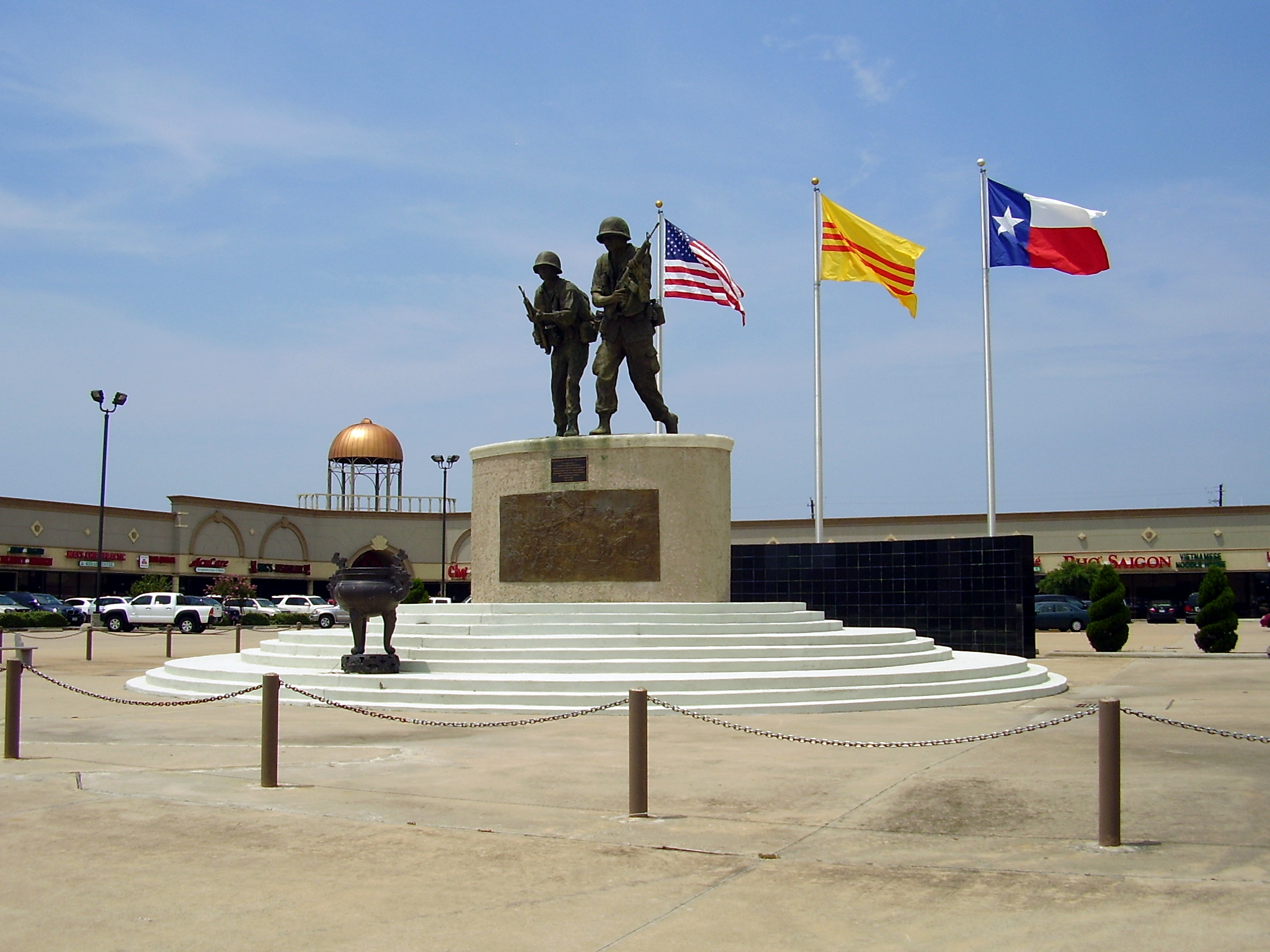
Vietnam War memorial in Little Saigon, Houston, Texas, United States.

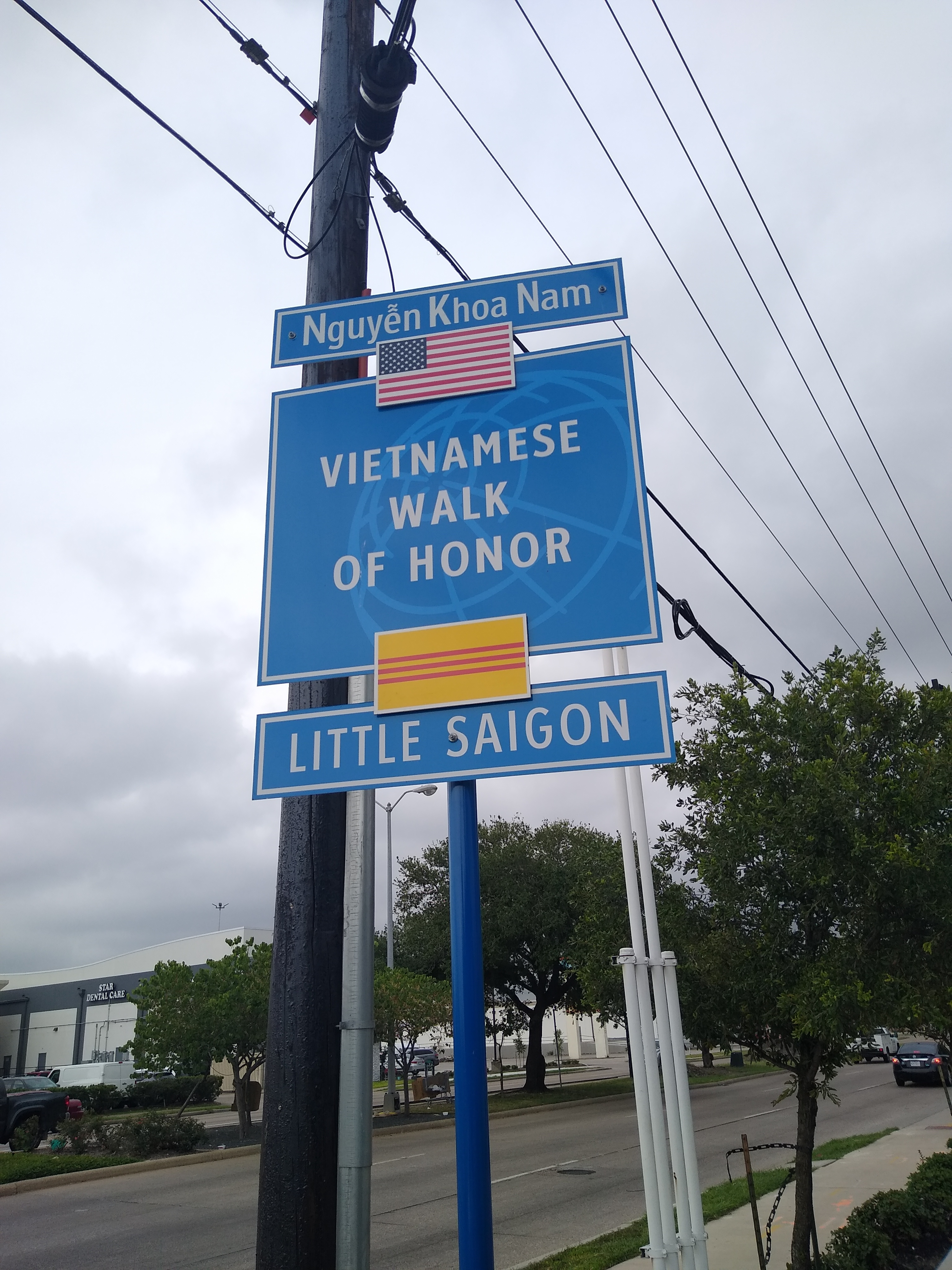
Vietnamese Walk of Honor Sign

Little Saigon, also popularly known as Vietnamtown or simply Viet-Town, is a neighborhood in Houston, Texas centered on Bellaire Boulevard west of Chinatown. It is one of the largest Vietnamese enclaves in the United States.

It is located within the International Management District. Because the neighborhood is adjacent to Chinatown, there is a misconception that it is a continuation of Chinatown. Little Saigon is, however, its own distinctive neighborhood. The portion of Bellaire Blvd was officially designated as Saigon Blvd by the City of Houston, and its intersecting streets were also designated Vietnamese names. In the City of Houston in 2016, there was a plan to officially designate the area as its own district. This was, however, rejected by the residents of the overall Alief area. The Vietnamese-American AM radio station, Radio Saigon Houston, is transmitted in the neighborhood.

== History ==
Before Asian businesses set up shop in Southwest Houston, many of them were based in an area that is now called East Downtown (EaDo). This area has gone through gentrification in the early 1990s to 2010s, causing what was left of Asian businesses to fade. Since the 1990s, Asian developers began settling in Southwest Houston an area heavily affected by the 1980s oil glut. Vietnamese businesses have dominated the area along Bellaire Boulevard west of Beltway 8. In 2003, architect Nghiep Nguyen's design for a Vietnam War memorial received funding and later debuted in 2005. This has since been one of Little Saigon's most prominent landmarks.

In 2015, city council members led by Richard Nguyen designated Vietnamese street names within the neighborhood and added Vietnamese street signs. The portion of Bellaire Blvd between Beltway 8 and Eldridge Parkway was designated Saigon Blvd (or Dai Lo Saigon). Additionally, the intersecting streets were also given Vietnamese names and street signs. Today, Little Saigon is known for its quality food options. Popular restaurant Crawfish and Noodles has appeared on many Travel Channel programs including Andrew Zimmern's Bizarre Foods America.

== Economy ==
Bellaire Boulevard is dominated by Vietnamese businesses and street signs. Since the 1980s, Asian businesses have constantly grown in Southwest Houston. Since the 2000s, this area has become a top destination in the restaurant industry. Houston City Council member Steve Le, a Vietnamese-American, has worked to promote the area and increase its tourism. In 2015, the Vietnamese street signs in the neighborhood were added in part due to increasing tourism efforts. Many of Houston's most iconic Vietnamese restaurants are located in the area such as Crawfish and Noodles, Pho Binh and Lee's Sandwiches. Vietnamese-American radio station, Radio Saigon Houston is transmitted in the Saigon Plaza.

== See also ==
- History of Vietnamese Americans in Houston
