= Chau Nguyen =

Vietnamese-American news anchor

- Born: 1973 (age 52–53)
- Occupation: Social Worker
- Known for: News Reporter and Social Worker
- Awards: Emmy

Chau Nguyen is a former Vietnamese-American news anchor most recently seen with KHOU-TV, before stepping down in December 2007 to become a social worker. She is now the Chief Public Strategies office for the Houston Area Women's Center.

Chau's family fled after the fall of Saigon, South Vietnam when she was 2 years old and her family settled in Houston, Texas.

== Career ==
Chau graduated from Katy High School in 1991, and attended the University of St. Thomas. Beginning in 2003, she worked as a morning news anchor at KHOU in her native Houston, Texas. In late 2007, the Houston Chronicle website reported that she gave notice and quit her job at KHOU. In December 2007, she anchored her last Saturday morning broadcast for KHOU. As a reporter she became the first Vietnamese American journalist to receive an Emmy for her series on medical missions taking place in Vietnam. In 2008, she returned to graduate school to pursue her Masters in Social Work from the University of Houston. After graduation Chau accepted a position at Houston Area Women's Center as a Manager of Community Involvement. In her role, Chau has made several public appearances, often serving as a spokesperson for the organization. In April 2016 she was promoted to the role of Chief Public Strategies officer. Her work continues as she brings up important topics in the press and to the government including the sexual assault, sexualization of Asian women, addressing gender disparities, and domestic violence.

== See also ==
- History of Vietnamese Americans in Houston
