= KREH =

Vietnamese-language radio station in Pecan Grove–Houston, Texas

- Pecan Grove, Texas; United States
- Broadcast area: Greater Houston
- Frequency: 900 kHz
- Branding: Radio Saigon Houston

Programming
- Language: Vietnamese
- Format: Asian

Ownership
- Owner: Bustos Media; (Bustos Media Holdings, LLC)
- Operator: Dương Phục and Vũ Thanh Thủy

History
- First air date: January 31, 1953 (Note: In Oakdale, Louisiana, moved to Pecan Grove on November 17, 1999.)
- Former call signs: KICR (1984–1994)
- Call sign meaning: Reddoch, Evans and Hooks, founding station owners

Technical information
- Licensing authority: FCC
- Facility ID: 71631
- Class: D
- Power: 5,000 watts (day); 10 watts (night)
- Transmitter coordinates: 29°38′38″N 96°5′46″W
- Translator: 99.7 K259DC (Houston)

Links
- Public license information: Public file; LMS
- Website: radiosaigonhouston.com

KREH (900 AM, "Radio Saigon Houston") is a Vietnamese radio station licensed to Pecan Grove, Texas, United States. KREH's studios are in Little Saigon and in the International District in Houston. It broadcasts on the frequency of 900 kHz and operates from sunrise to sunset under ownership of Bustos Media. It is one of only two Asian stations serving the Greater Houston area.

KREH has been operating in the Houston area since 1999; it was moved there from Oakdale, Louisiana, where it was established in 1953.

== History ==
=== In Oakdale, Louisiana ===
The Louisiana Broadcasting Service, owned by Cyril W. Reddoch, Klein Evans and Ralph Hooks, obtained a construction permit to build a new 250-watt, daytime-only radio station in Oakdale, Louisiana, on October 23, 1952. The station took the call letters KREH and signed on January 31, 1953, from its studios and transmitter east of town on the highway to Ville Platte. Evans, who had been a soldier stationed at Fort Bliss, died after he got lost flying home to De Ridder and crashed near New Waverly, Texas, in August 1953. Reddoch absorbed Evans's ownership stake, and Reddoch and Hooks became the owners of Louisiana Broadcasting Service, joined in 1958 by C. Winsett Reddoch; the Reddochs became the sole owners in 1970.

KREH was joined by an FM station, KCWR at 104.9 MHz, in 1972; by this time, KREH was a country music outlet affiliated with the ABC Entertainment network. The stations remained in these formats through their sale to George Mowad, a physician and the mayor of Oakdale, for $400,000 in 1981. Under Mowad, the interim station manager was Donald R. Lindig, a white man married to a Black woman. This led to harassment by the local Ku Klux Klan, whose leader, Oddist J. Lambright, was charged with conspiring to interfere with his rights by distributing flyers containing racial slurs and urging a boycott of the station by local businesses; Lambright and two others in Klan robes went to Lindig's apartment to encourage his family to leave town.

On October 16, 1982, Mowad carried out a format overhaul. KCWR, until then a contemporary outlet, flipped to country as KGBM-FM, and KREH became a southern gospel outlet. Two years later, both stations were sold to Strother Broadcasting Company of Louisiana for $350,000. KREH and KGBM-FM became KICR-AM-FM after the sale.

In 1988, the Federal Communications Commission approved a frequency change to 98.7 MHz and class increase for KICR-FM. The upgrade would allow the FM station to enter the Alexandria radio market. At the same time, both stations were sold to Bob Holladay and his B & D Communications for nearly $500,000. When the FM frequency change took place in 1990, the country format that had been on FM moved to the AM frequency. The move-in of KICR-FM to the Alexandria market also meant that all station operations relocated there. By 1993, the AM station was silent, and the station no longer maintained a presence in Oakdale. That year, B & D offered to donate the AM license to the West Missionary Baptist Church. However, there were technical obstacles, chief among them the removal of the station's tower due to its proximity to a new heliport at the local hospital. The donation was made later in 1993.

The new ownership, led by Carol Skaggs, set out to restore local radio service to Oakdale. Reclaiming the prior KREH call letters, the station built a new tower and returned to the air on October 12, 1994. One of its programs was a weekly swamp pop show hosted by Tommy McLain.

=== Moving to Houston ===
However, the local radio station would not last very long. In 1997, Skaggs filed to sell KREH to Jeffrey Eustis for $30,000. After the sale, the former studios were used as a recording studio, where McLain cut one of his albums.

That August, Eustis filed to move KREH from Oakdale to Pecan Grove, Texas, west of Houston, where the station would broadcast with 2,500 watts in the daytime and 100 watts at night. Eustis then sold the station two years later, before completion of the Pecan Grove facility, to Bustos Media for $750,000.

KREH launched from Pecan Grove in November 1999 and immediately began airing brokered Vietnamese-language programming, which had previously been broadcast on KENR (1070 AM). Radio Saigon Houston, which is co-owned by Dương Phục and Vũ Thanh Thủy, started at the same time with five employees, growing to over 80 contributing hosts and 35 employees by 2007. Growth of the station also prompted the station to move from its original Southwest Freeway studios to a new, custom-built 10-acre (4.0 ha) facility on Bellaire Boulevard. The Houston Chronicle cited the station as a factor in the migration of Vietnamese to Houston from the West Coast.

== Programming ==
Radio Saigon Houston produces a wide variety of Vietnamese-language programs, some of which are aired by other stations across the United States. Several programs are bilingual to attract younger audiences who prefer English and are less likely to listen to the station.

== See also ==
- History of Vietnamese Americans in Houston
