= Mai's =

Vietnamese restaurant in Houston, Texas, U.S.

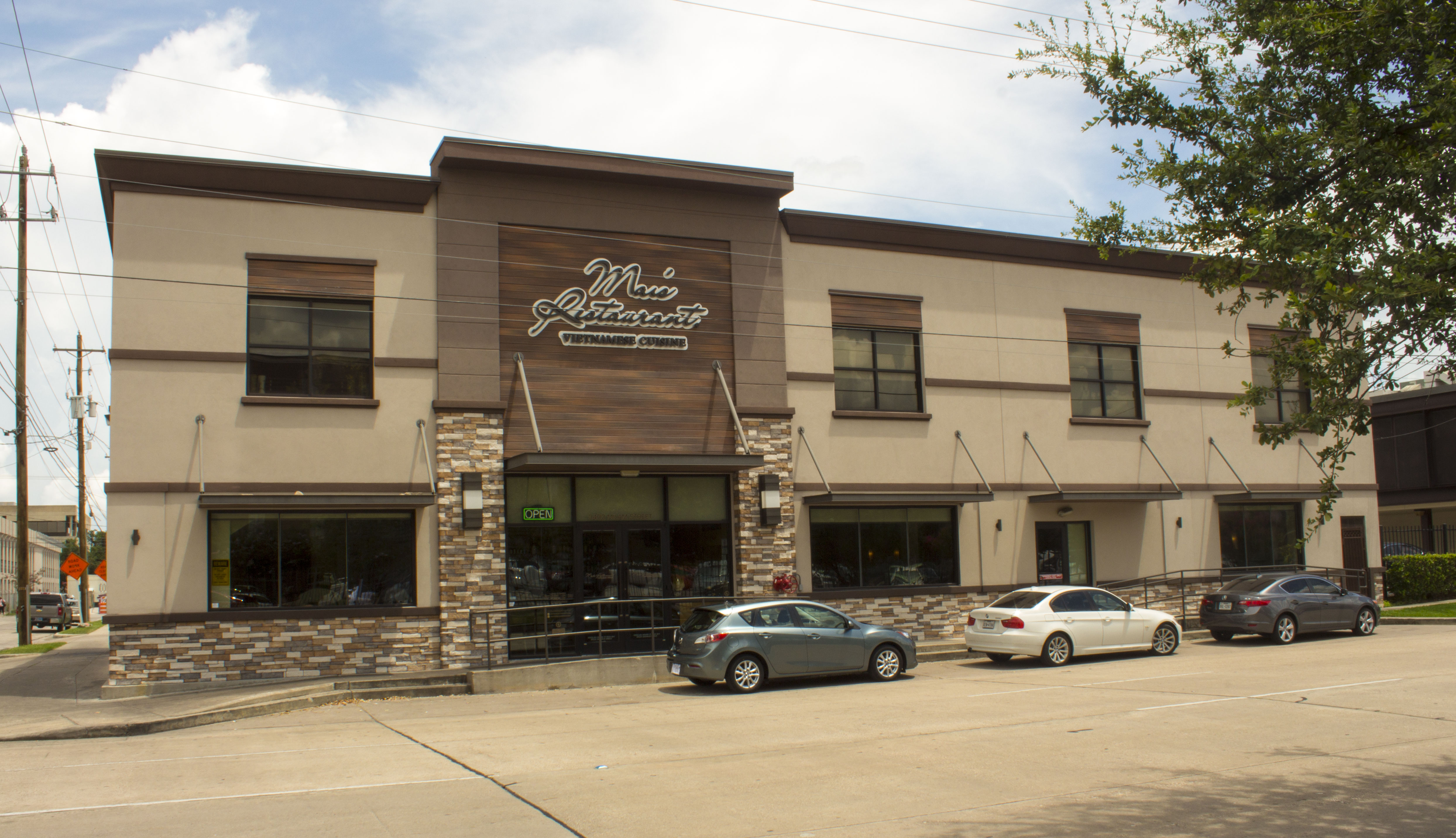

- Location within Texas Location within the United States

Restaurant information
- Established: 1978
- Owner: Anna Pham
- Head chef: Mai Nguyen
- Food type: Vietnamese
- Dress code: casual
- Location: 3403 Milam Street, Houston, Harris, Texas, 77002, United States
- Coordinates: 29.741192°N 95.379959°W
- Website: maishouston.com

Mai's is a Vietnamese restaurant in Houston, Texas that first opened in 1978.

It is located in Midtown.

== History ==
Originally opened in 1978 by Phin and Phac Nguyen, Mai's was the first restaurant in Houston to feature Vietnamese cuisine. The couple named the restaurant after their daughter, who took over the business in 1990. Her name means "golden flower", and this meaning, of significance to the family, along with its relatively simple pronunciation, was a reason for its selection. Mai had a signature dish, a beef stew.

A fire on February 15, 2010 caused most of the roof to collapse. The fire did not cause any injuries reported to authorities.

Authorities determined the incident was caused by a wok that caught fire. The restaurant re-opened on April 16, 2011. The business has since been passed down to Mai's daughter Anna. Phin Nguyen died in 2017.

Anthony Bourdain visited Mai's when he went to Houston in 2015. That year he stated the restaurant gave him "The first great meal and most memorable great meal I had in Houston".

== See also ==
- History of the Vietnamese-Americans in Houston
- List of Vietnamese restaurants
