= Shadow of the Dragon: Kira =

2008 novel by Kate O'Hearn

- First edition cover
- Author: Kate O'Hearn
- Language: English
- Series: Shadow of the Dragon
- Genre: Fantasy
- Publisher: Hodder Children's Books
- Publication date: April 3, 2008
- Publication place: United States
- Media type: Print (Paperback)
- Pages: 368 pp
- ISBN: 0-340-94528-1
- Followed by: Shadow of the Dragon: Elspeth

Shadow of the Dragon: Kira is a 2008 children's fantasy novel written by Kate O'Hearn. It is the first book in the Shadow of the Dragon series.

== Plot summary ==
Kira is a girl whose life is governed by the first law: all girls must marry at age 13. When the Lord Dorcon and the king's men come to arrest her family, Kira and her younger sister Elspeth flee. Led by a fox named Onnie, they take shelter on Rogue's mountain, home to Ferarchie, the most ferocious dragon in the land. They rescue one of Ferarchie's baby sons, and name it Jinx. Next they escape the mountain and find Paradon, a wizard. At this time Kira's brother Dane and his best friend Shanks-Spar are being trained to become dragon knights and go to war. However, when Kira's father attacks Lord Dorcan and is killed Dane is imprisoned in his place. With help from Shanks, Dane escapes and the two boys, along with their dragons Harmony and Rexor go to Paradon's castle and join the rest of Dane's family. They take shelter in his castle, until Lord Dorcon finds them. Then Paradon casts a spell to send them away from danger. At the end of the book he realises something horrible and says "What have I done?!"

== Characters ==
Kira is 12, and strong-willed. She does not agree with the cruel First Law, and she flees, with Elspeth, from Lord Dorcon. Then she turns thirteen, without being married, which is against First Law. She also breaks the law in several other ways.

Elspeth is 7, Kira's younger sister. She has a special way of communicating with animals on their farm, and even with the Rogue and other dragons. She too flees Lord Dorcon's wrath and takes refuge in the Rogue's mountain, with her beloved fox, Onnie.

Kahrin is 9, and sister to both Kira and Elspeth. She is taken to Lasser Commons when Lord Dorcon arrives.

Dane is Kira's older brother. When Lord Dorcon arrives, he is taken away to fight for the kingdom. He makes friends and escapes with fellow dragon-knight Shanks-Spar.

Lord Dorcon is King Arden's second-in-command. He has a grudge against Kira's father, and therefore Kira's whole family. He rides a black stallion.

Onnie is a fox that found Elspeth and Kira on the Rogue's Mountain. Since then, he has guided them through many perils, to safety.

Paradon is a wizard. However, his spells rarely work out; as a result his castle floats in the air, and has a frozen moat. Despite this, he helps Kira's family escape Lord Dorcon.

Ferarchie, also known as The Rogue, is the most ferocious and untamed dragon in the Kingdom. He lives on a mountain. He was born from a wizard's spell, which is why he is bigger than kingdom dragons, and has two tails. He is a red-purple colour.

Jinx is one of the Rogue's offspring. He is blue in colour, and like the Rogue, is twin-tailed and much bigger than kingdom dragons. He always follows Kira around.

== Sequel ==
Shadow of the Dragon: Elspeth
