= Shadow of the Dragon (Garland novel) =

1993 book by Sherry Garland

- Author: Sherry Garland
- Illustrator: John Hanley
- Cover artist: John Hanley
- Language: English
- Genre: Novel
- Publisher: Harcourt Trade Publishers
- Publication date: October 1993
- Publication place: United States
- Media type: Print (hardback & paperback)
- Pages: 314 pp
- ISBN: 0-15-273532-1
- OCLC: 28501386

Shadow of the Dragon is a 1993 book written by Sherry Garland. It chronicles Danny Vo and Nguyen Sang Le, two ethnic Vietnamese living in Houston; Danny is Americanized while Sang Le has difficulty adjusting to American culture and society.

== Plot ==
The main character is Danny Vo or Vo Van Duong, a Vietnamese American living in Houston; he left Vietnam at age 6. His family is hosting a homecoming party for his eighteen-year-old cousin Sang Le, who was sentenced in a re-education camp, or prison, in Vietnam for many years. Sang Le was a refugee in Hong Kong before arriving in Houston.

At the party, Sang Le meets a beautiful girl named Hong (meaning "Rose"; whom Danny rescued from the Cobras, a toan du dang (the Vietnamese name for a gang at the market)), and immediately falls in love with her while Hong sees Danny and falls in love with him. However, Danny already has a crush, an American girl named Tiffany Marie Schultz.

At school, it is hard for Sang Le to learn English, and as a result, he cannot understand his teachers; therefore he gets poor grades. The only subject he enjoys is art, where his teacher acknowledges him as one of the best students she has ever had. Danny is also struggling with American and Vietnamese life, with himself wanting American culture more while her parents and family pressure him into a traditional Vietnamese lifestyle.

His relationship with Tiffany is going well after they admit they both like each other. Sang Le eventually quits school and joins a Vietnamese street gang called the Cobras, whose leader Sang Le relates to. He repeatedly comes home late, lying about where he is and coming home with several hundred dollars a night. He says he is using the money to pay back Danny's family for bringing him to America, but he does not want to tell them where the money is coming from.

Tiffany eventually agrees to go on a date with Danny alone, but because she has to take care of her brother who has disabilities, she was not able to until her mother took the night shed as a nurse. When Danny takes her to her door, Tiffany's brother with his skinhead gang viciously beat him.

During the story the Vietnamese shops along Bellaire Boulevard in the Chinatown area are featured. It also features Vietnamese pool halls that were in close proximity to Downtown Houston.

Ba, the grandmother in the family, finds out about Sang Le's money and learns it comes from "jobs" given to him by the gang. She throws the money away and makes Sang Le promise to turn over a new leaf. He agrees, and the next night he stays home with Danny after the leader of the toan du dang tells Sang Le to meet him at the bida, or billiards hall, if he still wants to participate in the gang's activities. Sang Le resists the temptation, but later Danny lets him go to the store a block down to buy cigarettes.

When Sang Le doesn't return, Danny goes outside and finds Sang Le, beat up, at the foot of an oak tree outside their apartments. Sang Le tells Danny to tell Ba he did not go to the bida hall, and then he dies. The officer later tells Danny that Sang Le had been beaten to death by a baseball bat, which the skinhead gang threatened to use on him. He immediately knows who committed the crime, and has to decide between honoring Sang Le or keeping Tiffany Marie as his girlfriend. He goes to the officer who asked him questions, and tells him who committed the crime while Ba listens and accepts Danny.

The epilogue has Danny meeting Tiffany in the parking lot of his apartment. Danny is moving to a new house, the leader of the skinhead gang was murdered by the Cobra gang, and Tiffany had to sell their house and move to pay for her brother's bail.

== Reception ==
Publishers Weekly wrote that the author's "expert dramatization and deliberate pacing build steadily for a thoroughly gripping, thought-provoking work."

Kathy Adams of California English wrote that Shadow of the Dragon would be a good companion book for Children of the River by Linda Crew.

Marvin Hoffman, a member of the Rice University Department of Education and a teacher at Jones High School in Houston, wrote in the Houston Chronicle column "New for Young Adults" that "While the writing may not be elegant, Garland has done her readers a service, as she did in her earlier Song of the Buffalo Boy, by inviting us inside a community that occupies an important place in our midst but remains invisible and impenetrable to most of us." Hoffman stated that the ending was "overwrought and unnecessarily dramatic".

Awards:

- ABA's Pick of Lists
- ALA Best Book for Young Adults
- Booklist Editors Choice
- California Young Reader Medal [California]
- New York Public Library Book for the Teen Age
- Popular Paperbacks for Young Adults
- Texas Lone Star Reading List

== See also ==
- History of Vietnamese Americans in Houston
