= List of The Great Food Truck Race episodes =

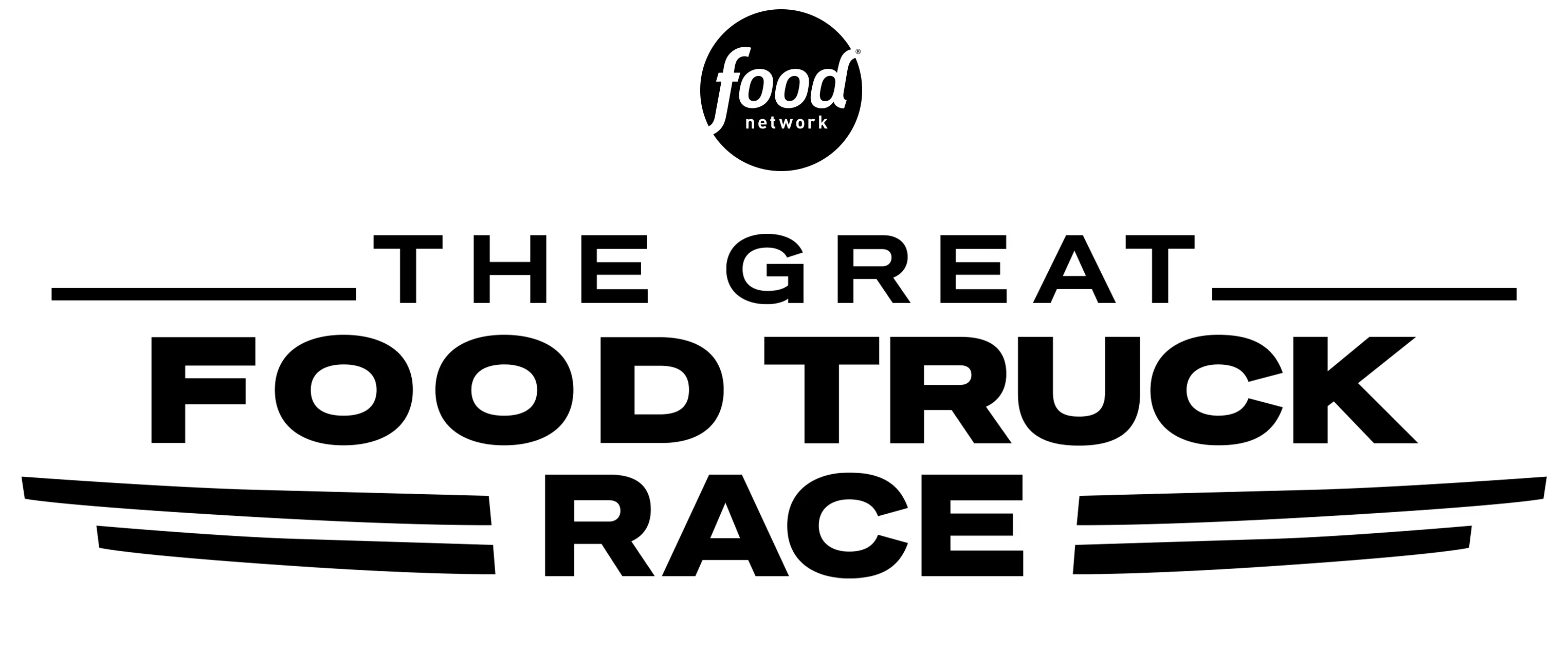
The Great Food Truck Race logo

The Great Food Truck Race is an American reality competition and cooking television series that airs on Food Network. The series is currently being hosted by Tyler Florence. It first premiered on August 15, 2010. The nineteenth season began airing on July 26, 2026. Within the program, a group of professional or even amateur food truck entrepreneurs compete against each other to win a cash prize. As of September 14, 2025, 127 episodes of The Great Food Truck Race have aired, concluding the eighteenth season.

== Series overview ==
Season	Subtitle	Episodes	Originally released	
Season	Subtitle	Episodes	First released	Last released
1	—N/a	6	August 15, 2010	September 19, 2010
2	—N/a	7	August 14, 2011	September 25, 2011
3	—N/a	7	August 19, 2012	September 30, 2012
4	—N/a	7	August 18, 2013	September 29, 2013
5	—N/a	7	August 17, 2014	September 28, 2014
6	Route 66	6	August 23, 2015	September 27, 2015
7	Family Face-Off	5	August 28, 2016	September 25, 2016
8	Battle for The South	6	August 20, 2017	September 24, 2017
9	Wild West	6	July 26, 2018	August 30, 2018
10	Summer Beach Battle	8	June 9, 2019	July 28, 2019
11	Holiday Hustle	4	November 27, 2019	December 18, 2019
12	Gold Coast	6	March 19, 2020	April 23, 2020
13	All-Stars – Battle of The Bay	6	June 7, 2021	July 18, 2021
14	Alaska – Battle for The North	6	March 7, 2021	April 11, 2021
15	Hottest Season Ever	8	June 5, 2022	July 24, 2022
16	David vs. Goliath	8	June 18, 2023	July 30, 2023
17	Games on The Gulf	8	June 30, 2024	August 18, 2024
18	Truckin' Awesome	8	August 3, 2025	September 14, 2025
19	Sweet and Savory	8	July 26, 2026	September 6, 2026

== Episodes ==
=== Season 1 (2010) ===
Team name	Team members	Hometown	Cuisine	Place
Austin Daily Press	Cory Nunez, Amy Hildenbrand, Melani Feinberg	Austin, Texas	Sandwiches	4
Crepes Bonaparte	Christian Murcia, Danielle Law, Matthew Meyer	Fullerton, California	Crêperie	5
Grill 'Em All	Ryan Hawkins, Matt Chernus, Joel Brown	Los Angeles, California	Burgers	1
Nana Queens	Janel Prator, Shanel Prator, Rick Wilson	Compton, California; Culver City, California	Banana pudding and wings	7
Nom Nom Truck	Misa Chien, Jennifer Green, David Kien	Los Angeles, California	Vietnamese, especially bánh mì	2
Ragin' Cajun	Stephen Domingue, Joey Quebedeaux, Jazmin Banionis	Hermosa Beach, California; Lafayette, Louisiana	Cajun	6
Spencer on the Go	Laurent Katgely, John Desmond, Jesse Vera	San Francisco, California	French	3

No. overall	No. in season	Title	Original release date
1	1	"Let's Get Rolling!"	August 15, 2010
2	2	"Chile Santa Fe"	August 10, 2010
3	3	"Where's the Beef?"	August 29, 2010
4	4	"The Big Uneasy"	September 5, 2010
5	5	"Small Town Trouble"	September 12, 2010
6	6	"New York Plate of Mind"	September 19, 2010

=== Season 2 (2011) ===
Team name	Team members	Hometown	Cuisine	Place
Café Con Leche	Gabriel Martinez, Maria Felipe, Frankie Tosta	Van Nuys, California	Cuban	6
Devilicious	Mark Manning, Dyann Huffman, Kristina Repp	San Diego, California	Comfort food	7
Hodge Podge	Chris Hodgson, Catie Hodgson, Jacquelyn Romanin	Cleveland, Ohio	Comfort food fusion	2
Korilla BBQ	Eddie Song, Paul Lee, Stephan Park	New York, New York	Korean barbecue	4
The Lime Truck	Daniel Shemtob, Jesse Brockman, Jason Quinn	Irvine, California	Californian	1
Roxy's Grilled Cheese	James DiSabatino, Mike DiSabatino, Marc Melanson	Boston, Massachusetts	Grilled cheese	3
Seabirds	Stephanie Morgan, Raya Belna, Nicole Daddona	Costa Mesa, California	Vegan	5
Sky's Gourmet Tacos	Barbara Burrell, Victor Burrell, Kevin Minor	Los Angeles, California	Mexican-Soul food fusion	8

No. overall	No. in season	Title	Original release date
7	1	"What Happens in Vegas"	August 14, 2011
8	2	"A Pinch of Salt Lake City"	August 21, 2011
9	3	"Rocky Mountain Highs and Lows"	August 28, 2011
10	4	"Big Bites, Little Apple"	September 4, 2011
11	5	"Hog Wild in Memphis"	September 11, 2011
12	6	"Midnight Truck to Georgia"	September 18, 2011
13	7	"Miami Heat"	September 25, 2011

=== Season 3 (2012) ===
Team name	Team members	Hometown	Cuisine	Place
Barbie Babes	Hayley Chapman, Jasmin De Main, Skye Boucaut	Los Angeles, California	Australian-style barbecue	7
Coast of Atlanta	Lena Price, Mike Jones, Tawanaca Davenport	Atlanta, Georgia	Seafood	5
Momma's Grizzly Grub	Angela Reynolds, Adriane Richey, Tiffany Seth	Wasilla, Alaska	Comfort food	4
Nonna's Kitchenette	Lisa Nativo, Jessica Stambach, Jaclyn Kolsby	Parsippany–Troy Hills, New Jersey; West Caldwell, New Jersey	Italian	2
Pizza Mike's	Mike Evans, Pat Snyder, Carlo Borgia	Columbus, Ohio	Italian-American	6
Pop-a-Waffle	Bob "Bobaloo" Koenig, Scott Stanley, Anthony Travers	Los Angeles, California	Waffles	3
Seoul Sausage	Chris Oh, Ted Kim, Yong Kim	Los Angeles, California	Korean	1
Under The Crust	Hannah Cohen, Sheri Cohen, Gary Miller	San Diego, California	Pie	8

No. overall	No. in season	Title	Original release date
14	1	"3,559 Miles to a Dream"	August 19, 2012
15	2	"Attitude at High Altitude"	August 26, 2012
16	3	"Even Food Trucks Are Bigger in Texas"	September 2, 2012
17	4	"Baby Got Razorback"	September 9, 2012
18	5	"Music City Madness"	September 16, 2012
19	6	"Mistake by the Lake?"	September 23, 2012
20	7	"Where in the World is Lubec?"	September 30, 2012

=== Season 4 (2013) ===
Team name	Team members	Hometown	Cuisine	Place
Aloha Plate	Adam Tabura, Lanai Tabura, Shawn Felipe	Los Angeles, California; Lānaʻi City, Hawaii	Hawaiian	1
Boardwalk Breakfast Empire	Joanne Garelli, Timothy Boulous, Ilene Winters	Sea Bright, New Jersey	Breakfast	7
Bowled and Beautiful	Heather Marshall, Liza Barnes, Jessica Butorovich	Los Angeles, California	Californian	5
Frankfootas	Dana Raja, Mirlinda Kukaj, Victoria Florenza	Brooklyn, New York	Hot dogs	6
Murphy's Spud Truck	Nicole Pollock, James Pollock, Suellen Pollock	Los Angeles, California	Baked potatoes	8
Philly's Finest Sambonis	Erik Thompson, Joseph Toner, Chris Turchi	Philadelphia, Pennsylvania	Cheesesteaks and sambonis	3
The Slide Show	Darrell "Das" Smith, Ahren Samuel, Maurice "Mo" McQueen	Los Angeles, California	Sliders	4
Tikka Tikka Taco	Michael Swaleh, Shaun Swaleh, Sam Swaleh	St. Louis, Missouri	Indian/Pakistani-Mexican fusion	2

No. overall	No. in season	Title	Original release date
21	1	"I Left My Food Cart in San Francisco"	August 18, 2013
22	2	"A Strange Brew in Portland"	August 25, 2013
23	3	"Pocatello is All About Potatoes, You Dig?"	September 1, 2013
24	4	"About Face in South Dakota"	September 8, 2013
25	5	"Double Trouble in the Twin Cities"	September 15, 2013
26	6	"A Food Truck Kind of Town, Chicago Is"	September 22, 2013
27	7	"Capital Gains"	September 13, 2013

=== Season 5 (2014) ===
Team name	Team members	Hometown	Cuisine	Place
Beach Cruiser	Gretta Kruesi, Shane Steinman, Nicole Hoffman	Venice, California	Californian	4
Chatty Chicken	Greg Carder Sr., Greg Carder Jr., Megan Jones	Chattanooga, Tennessee	Fried chicken	8
The Gourmet Graduates	Roberto Franco, Keese Chess, Julius Searight	Providence, Rhode Island	Gourmet dormitory food	7
Let There Be Bacon	Matt Heyman, Dylan Doss, Jon Ashton	Cleveland, Ohio	Bacon	3
Lone Star Chuck Wagon	Lance Kramer, Rachel Young, Andrea Chesley	Houston, Texas	Tex-Mex	2
Madres Mexican Meals	Javier Crespo Jr., Senorina Crespo, Luisa Galaviz Crespo	Norwalk, California	Mexican	5
The Middle Feast	Tommy Marudi, Hilla Marudi, Arkadi Kluger	Los Angeles, California	Middle Eastern	1
Military Moms	Carol Rosenberg, Michele Bajakian, Wendy Newman	Fort Drum, New York	Comfort food	6

No. overall	No. in season	Title	Original release date
28	1	"Venice Beach Brawl"	August 17, 2014
29	2	"Hot Doggin' It In Tucson"	August 24, 2014
30	3	"Dinner Dates, Austin Style"	August 31, 2014
31	4	"High Steaks in Texas"	September 7, 2014
32	5	"St. Louis Upsell"	September 14, 2014
33	6	"Shrimpin' Ain't Easy"	September 21, 2014
34	7	"Finale at Mile 0 – Winning Keys in Key West"	September 28, 2014

=== Season 6: Route 66 (2015) ===
Team name	Team members	Hometown	Cuisine	Place
Diso's Italian Sandwich Society	Adam DiSilvestro, Danamarie McKiernan, Benny Chodan	Brooklyn, New York	Italian sandwiches	6
Globally Delicious Stuffed Burgers "GD Bro"	Mark Cruz, Kevin Nguyen, Geoffrey Manila	Irvine, California	Burgers	3
The Guava Tree	Onel Perez, Pam Perez, Mariah Perez	Dallas, Texas	Cuban	7
Pho Nomenal Dumplings	Sunny Lin, Sophia Woo, Becca Plumlee	Raleigh, North Carolina	Taiwanese and Vietnamese	1
Postcards	Greg King, Grae King, Monique "Mo" Sutton	Los Angeles, California	Soul food	4
Spice It Up	Christine Paciora, Nichole Mellor, Keri Fraizer	Phoenix, Arizona	International cuisine	5
Waffle Love	Adam Terry, Jared Terry, Steven Terry	Provo, Utah	Belgian waffles	2

No. overall	No. in season	Title	Original release date	Viewers (millions)	18–49 rating
35	1	"All-American Road Trip"	August 23, 2015	N/A	N/A
Since the contestants are all professional food-truck owners, they immediately receive their first task: sell $200 worth of their most popular item on the Santa Monica Pier. Spice It Up is the first team to hit this goal, so an extra $100 is added to the $200 they made. The money they make becomes their seed money, along with an extra $66 given by Tyler in honor of the route they would be traveling, Route 66. They are all given a map directing them to Lake Havasu City, Arizona. Pho Nomenal Dumplings' truck breaks down before they can start selling, so they have to be towed to their selling destinations that weekend. The Guava Tree has a bit of trouble with their generator on day two but manages to fix it. In honor of Lake Havasu City's London Bridge, the trucks are given cod and potatoes with which they must make their version of fish and chips. Diso's Italian Sandwich Society wins $500 for being the first team to sell 20 of their fish and chips dishes. Waffle Love wins the episode; The Guava Tree is eliminated.
36	2	"Off-Road Eats in Arizona"	August 30, 2015	N/A	N/A
Staying in Arizona, the trucks drive to Flagstaff (with Pho Nomenal Dumplings having rented a new truck to replace their old one). Everyone receives $200 of seed money and are told to sell as much as possible for a potential advantage later on. All the trucks have trouble selling in cold, rainy weather on the first day, but Waffle Love sells the most and is given a one-hour head start on day two, when they move a few miles south to Sedona. All the trucks end up selling at a large supermarket parking lot. There is a sizable vegetarian community in Sedona, which prompts Spice It Up and GD Bro to add a vegetarian dish to their menu. Late in the morning on the third day, the teams have to sell rattlesnake rabbit sausage dishes while riding in pink jeeps. At 2:00 pm, they return to pay $100 for the sausage. All profits from selling the sausage dishes are doubled for every team. Spice It Up sells the most with $435, and Waffle Love is the only truck to lose money (−$10). Spice It Up wins the episode; Diso's Italian Sandwich Society is eliminated.
37	3	"Spicy Showdown in Santa Fe"	September 6, 2015	N/A	N/A
Upon arriving in Santa Fe, teams are given a cooking challenge in which they must create a dish using New Mexico chiles and $50 of additional ingredients. A local chef, Martin Rios, judges the dishes and awards $1000 to Postcards. The trucks have a steady stream of customers on the first day. In the middle of the day, the teams are told to buy all their food for the rest of the weekend because they would not be allowed to shop again even if they sold out. At the beginning of day two, the teams are given spots next to each other at the Santa Fe Railyard Farmers Market, where they must stay until the farmers market closes. Spice It Up sells out with four hours left in the day and cannot restock. Postcards accidentally dings the bumper of a parked car and is fined $500 for leaving the accident and for the actual damage. Waffle Love wins the episode; Spice It Up is eliminated.
38	4	"High Steaks in Texas"	September 13, 2015	1.60	0.63
Teams drive to The Big Texan Steak Ranch restaurant in Amarillo, where they are given an initial $50 in seed money and a chance to earn more by eating 72 oz of steak, a salad, a baked potato, three fried shrimp, and a dinner roll within a span of 20 minutes. Pho Nomenal Dumplings finishes first, followed by GD Bro and Waffle Love; they receive $250 each. Postcards does not finish and only earns $200. The teams are given a culinary challenge of making and selling the most steak dishes. GD Bro sells the most and wins $500. The dishes are also secretly judged by steakhouse owner Bobby Lee, who awards $500 to Pho Nomenal Dumplings. All four trucks sell from the same supermarket parking lot on day one and have strong sales, though Postcards is slow to open. On day two, GD Bro and Pho Nomenal Dumplings sell in one parking lot while Waffle Love and Postcards sell in another. As with every Sunday thus far, the Waffle Love team attends church before selling their food. GD Bro wins the episode; Postcards is eliminated.
39	5	"Roadside Attractions"	September 20, 2015	N/A	N/A
Upon arrival at the Blue Whale of Catoosa in Oklahoma, the teams' cell phones are taken away, and they are required to make roadside attractions to market their trucks instead of social media. They also have to sell a $15 dish to complement their attraction. Tyler and a local classic car club member, Dick McGuire, visit the attractions and taste each dish. The teams' phones are returned for the second day. On day two, the trucks arrive at the Admiral Twin Drive-in to serve members of a classic car club. They have twenty minutes to pitch their roadside special dish to as many cars as possible. Afterwards, each club member drives by the truck of their choice and uses a $25 chip to buy their preferred dish. Waffle Love makes $925 total compared to the other teams' $450 each. Waffle Love wins the episode; GD Bro is eliminated.
40	6	"Showdown in Chi-Town"	September 27, 2015	N/A	N/A
The final two compete under the Gateway Arch in a final cooking challenge. They have 90 minutes to create three dishes using chicken, ground beef, and pork steak. Pitmasters Alex and Frank from Adam's Smokehouse judge Pho Nomenal Dumplings to be the winner, which allows them to sell 30 fewer dishes in the final phase. After receiving $150 in seed money, the teams are sent to Springfield, Illinois, for a 3-hour pitstop to earn more money for supplies. Because Springfield is the birthplace of Abraham Lincoln, teams can only accept $5 bills, which feature Lincoln on their front. Pho Nomenal Dumplings earns $796, and Waffle Love earns $755. Their final challenge is to sell 50 dishes customized to three different Chicago neighborhoods: Chinatown, Little Italy, and Greektown. After selling all 50 dishes in each neighborhood (though only 20 in Chinatown for Pho Nomenal Dumplings), they have to be the first across the finish line at Buckingham Fountain. Pho Nomenal Dumplings initially sells outside of Greektown's boundaries, forcing them to resell all 50 dishes inside of Greektown, but they still finish first to win the season.

=== Season 7: Family Face-Off (2016) ===
Team name	Team members	Hometown	Cuisine	Place
BigMista's Fatty Wagon	Neil "BigMista" Strawder, Phyllis Strawder, Eric Lara	Long Beach, California	Texas-style barbecue	5
Carretto Siciliano	Vinny Guadagnino, Paola Guadagnino, Angelo Giaimo	Staten Island, New York	Sicilian	2
Fortune Cooking	Tom Lin, Julie Hill-Lin, Tiffany Webster	Milford, Michigan; Denver, Colorado	Chinese	6
Grilled Cheese All-Stars	Michael Kalish, Charlie Kalish, Bryce Adams	San Francisco, California; San Diego, California	Grilled cheese	1
Lei-Away Leidies	Carey Ofahengaue, Summer Prescott, Autumn Prescott	Provo, Utah; Lāʻie, Hawaii	Hawaiian	3
Sweet Southern Soul	Tiffany Ermon, Tikia Travis, Kizzma Snoddy	Chicago, Illinois; Atlanta, Georgia	Soul food	4

No. overall	No. in season	Title	Original release date	Viewers (millions)	18–49 rating
41	1	"A Family Affair"	August 28, 2016	N/A	N/A
The six teams arrive at Six Flags Magic Mountain, where they complete a short challenge to receive their keys before leaving for Los Angeles to sell. Sweet Southern Soul has issues with their truck's pilot light, and they are unable to make any sales on the first day. Vinny from Carretto Siciliano receives a parking ticket, which eats into the team's day-one profits. On the morning of day two, teams bid for the opportunity to sell inside Six Flags. Carreto Siciliano obtains the spot for $400. Later, Tom from Fortune Cooking accidentally sideswipes two parked Los Angeles food trucks, damaging a mirror and cooler cover. Carretto Siciliano wins the episode, and Fortune Cooking is eliminated.
42	2	"Things Get Berry Interesting"	September 4, 2016	N/A	N/A
At a strawberry festival in Oxnard, teams are challenged to make two dishes, one sweet and one savory. Bonnie Atmore, a spokeswoman for the strawberry festival, visits each truck to taste their strawberry dishes. She deems Sweet Southern Soul's best, which wins them $300. Lei-Away Leidies uses a strategy, pioneered by Aloha Plate in season 4, of calling on Hawaiian locals in each city to support their business. On day two, all four of the other trucks begin selling at a farmer's market. Grilled Cheese All-Stars sells their food at a low price, which increases sales but decreases profit. BigMista's Fatty Wagon overfills their propane tank, forcing them to wait for the excess to leak out before they can cook. After they move to a location with slow foot traffic, they decide to close early. Lei-Away Leidies wins the episode; BigMista's Fatty Wagon is eliminated.
43	3	"An Eggcellent Adventure"	September 11, 2016	1.27	0.43
At OstrichLand USA, an ostrich and emu ranch in Santa Barbara County, teams participate in an egg hunt inside a large ostrich pen. Once each team member finds one of their team's three eggs, they are free to begin selling in the nearby town of Solvang. While they shop for ingredients, teams are told to make a family recipe dish using their three ostrich eggs. A secret shopper, Chef Seth, tries their dishes and names Carretto Siciliano as the best, making them safe from elimination. All teams park close together and draw huge lines. Partway through day two, teams' pots and pans are replaced for a few hours by Danish æbleskive pans matching the town's Danish heritage. Carretto Siciliano wins the episode; Southern Soul Food is eliminated.
44	4	"A Dessert in the Desert"	September 18, 2016	1.18	0.36
The teams met near the Cabazon Dinosaurs tourist attraction on the outskirts of Palm Springs. Before they go shopping, they are challenged to sell desserts priced at $6 using chocolate, fresh fruit, and nuts that they bid on. Grilled Cheese All-Stars wins an extra $200 by selling the most of these desserts. All three teams park downtown, though Lei-Away Leidies only does so after a long time spent searching for a spot. On day two, teams compete for $200 by becoming human roadside attractions. Carretto Siciliano wins the money by taking the most photos with people. Grilled Cheese All-Stars wins the episode; Lei-Away Leidies is eliminated. After elimination, the two remaining teams are given their seed money for the finale and sent to their final destination.
45	5	"The Island"	September 25, 2016	N/A	N/A
The final two teams drive to San Pedro, where they have one hour to shop, prep, and load their trucks onto a barge heading to their final destination: Catalina Island. While their trucks are being transported, the teams sell hot dogs out of carts in San Pedro for about two hours. The team that makes the most money selling hot dogs is taken to Catalina Island by helicopter, earning them an hour head start, while the other team travels by boat. Grilled Cheese All-Stars wins this challenge and arrives in Catalina Island first, beginning a twelve-hour selling period to determine the season's winner. When Caretta Siciliano arrives, the two teams compete side by side for the rest of the twelve hours. Afterwards, at Catalina Casino, Tyler announces Grilled Cheese All-Stars as the winner of the season. It is also revealed that Food Network will air a miniseries for both teams, Vinny & Ma Eat America for Caretta Siciliano and Big Cheese for Grilled Cheese All-Stars.

=== Season 8: Battle for The South (2017) ===
Team name	Team members	Hometown	Cuisine	Place
Braised in the South	Nick Hunter, Steven Klatt, Brandon Lap	Charleston, South Carolina	Lowcounty and South Carolina-style barbecue	1
The Breakfast Club	Mikey Robins, Taylor Randolph, Ashanti Dixon	Philadelphia, Pennsylvania	Breakfast and brunch	3
Mr. Po' Boys	Cedric McCoy, Ryan Thompson, Esther Torres	Dallas, Texas	Po'boy sandwiches	2
Papi Chulo's Empanadas	Luis Lara Polanco, Carleena Lara-Bregatta, Sarah Hasbun	Cherry Hill, New Jersey	Dominican, especially empanadas	6
The Southern Frenchie	Donnie Ferneau, Meaghan Ferneau, Amanda Ivy	Little Rock, Arkansas	Southern	4
Stick 'Em Up	Shona House, Justin House, Landon House	Rogersville, Tennessee	Skewers	5
Wicked Good Seafood	Bill Henrique, Ryan Schuhmacher, Dan Torres	Falmouth, Massachusetts	New England, especially seafood	7

No. overall	No. in season	Title	Original release date	Viewers (millions)	18–49 rating
46	1	"The Big 'Not So Easy'"	August 20, 2017	N/A	N/A
The contestants begin in New Orleans with a challenge to sell their version of a decadent beignet. Ingredients are provided, and any profit made is added to their $300 seed money. Stick 'Em Up makes the most money ($131), and Wicked Good Seafood makes the least ($35). Teams have varied success selling on the first day and generally improve slightly during the second. On day two, the teams make a special dish using ingredients from the city’s popular Hurricane cocktail (passionfruit, orange, and lime). New Orleans Chef Susan Spicer samples each truck’s dish and awards $100 to Mr. Po' Boys. The Breakfast Club wins the episode, and Wicked Good Seafood is eliminated.
47	2	"New Marching Orders"	August 27, 2017	1.07	0.30
Upon arriving at the Naval Air Station Pensacola, teams are given a challenge. Working in pairs, they must make cohesive dishes to serve to 50 aviation service members, who would choose their favorite dish from among the three teams. During the challenge, Papi Chulo's Empanadas runs out of their tortillas before they could serve all the troops. The service members select the dish produced by Braised in the South and The Southern Frenchie, who each receive $200 in seed money. While shopping, Papi Chulo's Empanadas cannot find empanada dough and opt to sell tacos instead. Southern Frenchie, having won a monetary challenge, initially focuses on prep for the next day rather than first-day sales. However, when they see other trucks with plenty of customers, they scramble to make sandwiches to sell. Mr. Po' Boys discovers that Stick 'Em Up has a good spot at City Hall and parks nearby; they are joined by Southern Frenchie on day two. The mayor of Pensacola, Ashton Hayward, challenges the teams to incorporate Northern red snapper into a dish. Stick 'Em Up sells the most fish dishes and wins immunity. Mr. Po' Boys wins the episode, and Papi Chulo's Empanadas is eliminated.
48	3	"Sweet Home Alabama"	September 3, 2017	1.11	0.33
At the Tuscaloosa courthouse, teams are met with a series of pecan-related challenges. First, two people from each truck try to crack as many pecans as possible in 15 minutes. The winner, Braised in the South, is mentored by baker Jan Potter. In the second part, all teams must add pecan desserts to their menu. The team to sell the most pecan dessert dishes, The Breakfast Club, wins $300. Most teams experience strong sales throughout the day, except for Stick 'Em Up, who park in a supermarket parking lot. Early on the second day, Tyler announces a "happy hour" during which the pecan specials are sold for $1 each. Stick 'Em Up and Mr. Po' Boys both sell out on the second day. Braised in the South wins the episode, and Stick 'Em Up is eliminated.
49	4	"Hot Chicken in The City"	September 10, 2017	1.08	0.33
In Nashville, teams make their version of fried, spicy hot chicken but without using chicken. This dish is tasted by chef Aqui Hines, who likes Mr. Po' Boys's best and awards them $500. All trucks have low sales on day one, and Mr. Po' Boys drive for hours seeking a good parking spot. On day two, teams compete in a self-promotion challenge. Tyler and country singer Craig Wayne Boyd judge The Breakfast Club to have done the best at promoting their truck, which wins them immunity from elimination. Customers are more numerous than the day before. Braised in the South wins the episode, and The Southern Frenchie is eliminated.
50	5	"Fresh off the Farm"	September 17, 2017	1.10	0.34
Arriving at Thomas Orchards in Athens, Georgia, the teams are greeted by Tyler and a peach challenge. The teams have 30 minutes to make a savory peach appetizer for Tyler and Chef Mimi Maumus to taste. Then winners could choose to shut down their competitors for one hour at any point during their time in Georgia, and they shut down the other two trucks in the middle of day 2. Teams are required to partner with a local business because Athens law prohibits street parking. As they shop for ingredients, Tyler texts the teams and tells them to change their menus for the weekend and bars them from selling anything they have sold in the season so far. Braised in the South wins the episode, and The Breakfast Club is eliminated.
51	6	"The Race Through Savannah"	September 24, 2017	N/A	N/A
In Savannah, Mr. Po' Boys immediately gets a prime parking spot in front of a bar, while Braised in the South takes longer to find a spot. Teams are sidetracked by a challenge to sell their food out of pedicabs for one hour. Braised in the South outsells their competitor in this challenge, winning $500. Day two features a long challenge during which the teams sell side by side. At the start of the day, Tyler gives both teams a location to sell at and a shellfish to cook. Every few hours, they are given a new location and a new shellfish. Braised in the South wins the challenge, worth $500, by selling more dishes. At the Savannah riverfront, Braised in the South is announced as the season’s winner.

=== Season 9: Wild West (2018) ===
Team name	Team members	Hometown	Cuisine	Place
Buns N' Thighs	Ian M. Sherwin, Veronic Elena Nones, Marla Nones	Chicago, Illinois	Sliders and sandwiches	5
Chops' Shop	Bryan "Chop" Soliz, Sandra Soliz, Sonia Buckelew	Pearland, Texas	Tex-Mex	4
Heroes on a Half Shell	Donna Sheron, Clinton "CJ" Sheron, Danni Sheron	Frederick, Maryland	Submarine sandwiches	6
Just Wing It	Steven Crowley, Kevin Pettice, Sharon Shvarzman	New York, New York	Wings	1
Mobile Moo Shu	Michelle Gautier, Chelsea Smith, Marley Vanderbrook	Detroit, Michigan	East Asian fusion	3
New England Grill	Kevin Des Chenes, Eddie Gallagher, Christine Hurley	Newport, Rhode Island	New England	2
Sassy Soul	Paris "Sassy" Henry, Lauren Carson, Parris Jewel	Silver Spring, Maryland; Washington, D.C.	Soul food	7

No. overall	No. in season	Title	Original release date	Viewers (millions)	18–49 rating
52	1	"Wagons Ho!"	July 26, 2018	N/A	N/A
At a ranch near Los Angeles, teams have to hand-squeeze enough oranges to fill a pitcher before they are given their seed money and food truck. New England Grill gets their truck first, and Buns N' Thighs are the last to fill up their pitchers. Most teams sell in Hollywood for the first day, but New England Grill accidentally breaks their generator while a few miles away, leaving them without lights. At the start of day two, teams are challenged to sell as many beef dishes at $12 per plate as possible in three hours. The team that sells the most beef dishes wins $200. Before beginning, they bid on cuts of beef. Mobile Moo Shu wins the challenge with a flank steak dish that they purchased for $80. Throughout the day, most trucks have trouble attracting a steady stream of customers, and Sassy Soul spends most of their three-hour challenge window driving around. Sassy Soul is eliminated, and Mobile Moo Shu wins the episode as the only team to make a profit.
53	2	"Shrimp and Glitz"	August 2, 2018	0.99	0.28
When teams arrive in Las Vegas, they are immediately met with a challenge. Using shrimp and pantry staples, they must make a signature shrimp dish to sell head to head on Fremont Street. The team to sell the most in four hours wins a prime, exclusive selling spot next to the Strip for the second day. Mobile Moo Shu wins this challenge. Tyler and restaurant business consultant Elizabeth Blau taste each truck’s signature dish and offer menu tips and financial advice. On day two, teams receive $200 to purchase ingredients with. Heroes on a Half Shell pair up with Chops' Shop, and many trucks experience both lulls and high-selling periods. Buns N' Thighs wins the episode, and Heroes on a Half Shell are eliminated.
54	3	"An Oasis in the Desert"	August 9, 2018	0.98	0.30
Teams meet Tyler and Sonic executive Mackenzie Gibson at a Sonic restaurant in Phoenix, Arizona. The first part of their challenge involves a blind taste test of three Sonic beverages. In the second part, teams make a dish inspired by one of five Sonic drinks. Mobile Moo Shu guesses the most flavors correctly and gets to pick their preferred drink for the second part of the challenge. Tyler and Mackenzie judge Chops’ Shop to have used their drink flavor best in their dish and award them $200. During the selling period, Just Wing It sneakily parks near Mobile Moo Shu. Victoria and Marla, both from Buns N' Thighs, leave the competition to take care of a home business and an ailing father, respectively. Chef Ian is left alone to handle the food truck. He recruits a passerby to help on the first day and works alone on the second. On day two, Mobile Moo Shu and Just Wing It park illegally and are forced to change locations. New England Grill wins the episode. Buns N' Thighs, with only one team member, is eliminated.
55	4	"Bordertown Boom"	August 16, 2018	1.09	0.30
At the Arizona Territory Prison, teams participate in an artichoke peeling relay race before they are given their seed money and a cooking challenge. For the challenge, teams are tasked with combining bacon and artichoke into one dish. New England Grill sells the most of their dishes, winning them immunity. The first day, all the trucks draw huge crowds and sell out of food; Chops' Shop is particularly affected because they bought fewer ingredients, recalling their slow sales in past cities. Christine from New England Grill suffers a head injury and misses half of the second day while at the hospital. All four trucks are sent to a main street festival partway into day two, where they once again sell out, forcing them all to make a second shopping trip. Also on day two, Tyler instructs the teams to eliminate their most popular menu dish and replace it with something new. New England Grill wins the episode, and Chops' Shop is eliminated.
56	5	"First Dates"	August 23, 2018	N/A	N/A
Teams meet at a date garden in Coachella Valley for a quick challenge. Once they have removed the pits from a pound of dates, they can begin selling. The three trucks also make a dish using the dates they pitted. The co-owners of the garden judge the dishes and award $600 to Just Wing It. All three trucks end up on the same block and have steady sales. On day two, the trucks manage to enter a pre–music festival resort pool party for the lunch rush. When sales are slower at dinner, Just Wing It closes early, and the other teams go elsewhere. Just Wing It wins the episode, and Mobile Moo Shu is eliminated.
57	6	"The Whole Enchilada"	August 30, 2018	N/A	N/A
In downtown Los Angeles, the teams meet Mexican restaurateur Bricia Lopez, and they learn that the challenges will require them to use ingredients from Mexican cuisine. The first day’s challenge requires them to use chayote squash in a special dish. New England Grill wins $350 for making the better dish. The second day’s challenge requires the teams to use habanero peppers in a dish priced at $10. Just Wings It sells more of their dish and so doubles their profits from the dish. Tyler visits both teams to give a pep talk, and Mobile Moo Shu visits Just Wing It. The final elimination takes place at a Western movie set in Paramount Ranch, where New England Grill is eliminated and Just Wing It is announced as the winner.

=== Season 10: Summer Beach Battle (2019) ===
Team name	Team members	Hometown	Cuisine	Place
Baby Got Mac	Clinton Jones, Samma Jones, Rosa Linares	Los Angeles, California	Macaroni and cheese	6
Brunch Babes	Lara Webster, Mariah Sniegowski, Lydia VanWormer	Grand Rapids, Michigan	Brunch	2
Frank-N-Slides	Steve Weston, Craig Smith, Kyle Moore	Boise, Idaho	Sliders and hot dogs	4
Madea Made	Faith Johnson, Hope Thourogood, Andre Thourogood	Virginia Beach, Virginia	Soul food	5
Make It Maple	Sue Aldrich, Charles Aldrich, Paulette Fiorentino-Robinson	Montpelier, Vermont	Maple-flavored food	9
NOLA Creations	Darrell Johnson, Aunna Johnson, Terrell Gaskin	Atlanta, Georgia	Louisiana Creole	1
The People's Fry	Dareka Nicholson, Terrance Nicholson, Mahdi Ekadi	Nashville, Tennessee	Loaded fries	8
Rolling Indulgence	Drew Ballard, Jess Sarra, Travis Day	Dayton, Ohio	Diner food	3
Sol Food Collective	Jacquelyn Jones, Malyssa Lyles, Stephanie Graney	Los Angeles, California	Vegan	7

No. overall	No. in season	Title	Original release date	Viewers (millions)	18–49 rating
58	1	"Rumble on the Boardwalk"	June 9, 2019	1.10	0.33
The season begins with a challenge at Plyler Park in Myrtle Beach, South Carolina. Teams compete for $300 by preparing "boardwalk bites" to serve to Tyler and ten beachgoers, who declare Sol Food Collective to be the winner. After the challenge, while driving to the store for ingredients, Sol Food Collective accidentally sideswipes the front of Rolling Indulgence's truck with their own, causing minor damage to both vehicles. Teams return to Plyler Park, where they sell alongside each other for the day. On day two, teams are given three pounds of crab meat for their next challenge. Each team creates a new dish incorporating the crab meat, with the team that makes the most money from their dish winning immunity from elimination. Sol Food Collective, being a vegan team, chooses not to participate in the challenge. The People's Fry wins the challenge. NOLA Creations wins the episode, and Make It Maple is eliminated.
59	2	"Back Nine Barbecue"	June 16, 2019	1.14	0.31
Staying in South Carolina, teams meet at the 18th hole of Harbour Town Golf Links for the first challenge. A member of each team attempts a five-foot putt to determine the order in which they can choose the side dish they would make for the rest of the day. Only Baby Got Mac succeeds, so they choose first. Choosing proceeds according to teams' placement in the previous episode. Teams begin selling barbecue at Shelter Cove Community Park, incorporating pulled pork given to them by Tyler into their menu. On day two, teams are given two pounds of boiled peanuts, the state snack of South Carolina, and incorporate them into an existing menu item. Baby Got Mac sells the most peanut-infused dishes, earning them an extra $400. Many customers describe a long wait, leading Tyler to lecture teams about the importance of fast service at elimination. NOLA's Creations wins the episode, and The People's Fry is eliminated.
60	3	"Fast and Furious"	June 23, 2019	1.27	0.33
Stephanie, who had been driving Sol Food Collective's truck during its collision in week 1, leaves the show. At Daytona International Speedway, the teams participate in a "donut dash", where they craft as many identical, on-brand donuts as possible in one hour. Tyler and Donnie Summerlin, owner of Donnie's Donuts, act as judges. Brunch Babes wins the challenge and the ability to call an "audible pit stop", during which all other teams pause sales and cooking until they score 50 points in a game of cornhole. Later, teams arrive at Daytona Beach Boardwalk to begin selling. As they prepare their food, a health inspector fines NOLA Creations $600. Sales on day one start strong but later dwindle. On day two, Atlantic white shrimp is delivered to the teams, with which they have one hour to create and sell a dish. The team that sells the most shrimp dishes receives an extra $10 per dish. Sol Food Collective and Rolling Indulgence decline to compete. Madea Made wins, having sold 19 shrimp specials in one hour. Malyssa of Sol Food Collective is hospitalized, leaving Jacquelyn alone. Other teams assist Jacquelyn, but Sol Food Collective is ultimately eliminated. Rolling Indulgence wins the episode.
61	4	"Tampa 911"	June 30, 2019	1.14	0.33
In downtown Tampa, Hillsborough County Sheriff Chad Chronister has a staged confrontation with Tyler before he is introduced as a judge for the first challenge. Teams have thirty minutes to create their twist on a Cuban sandwich, a Tampa invention, and serve their dish to Tyler, Chad, and the deputies; the deputy squadron votes on the winner. The winner, Madea Made, receives a sheriff star badge that allows them to steal $100 from one team's final total at elimination and "not get arrested". They choose to steal from Frank-N-Slides. For the first time this season, teams find their own location to sell. Day two of selling brings rain and the second challenge. Teams are given fresh grouper from the Gulf of Mexico, which they must incorporate into a dish. The team that makes the most profit off the dish, Frank-N-Slides, wins $400. Frank-N-Slides wins the episode, and Baby Got Mac is eliminated.
62	5	"Burger Brawl"	July 7, 2019	1.14	0.35
Pulling into an alligator park in Fort Myers, Florida, teams are met with their first challenge. One team member must act as a zookeeper to move a young alligator from a wet enclosure to a dry one. Frank-N-Slides accomplishes this the quickest and wins a one-hour head-start on selling. Tyler provides teams with gator tail and sausage to optionally use in their menu. Rolling Indulgence, NOLA Creations, and Brunch Babes secure spots at the same brewery and are overwhelmed with customers. On day two, all the teams park on First Street in Downtown Fort Myers but disperse after the lunch rush. In the second challenge, teams create a "risky road trip" burger to sell on their trucks. An undercover judge from Sarasota, Chef Joe DiMaggio Jr., tries all five burgers under the alias "Nick". Chef DiMaggio judges NOLA Creation's burger to be the riskiest and tastiest, which wins them immunity. At elimination, Brunch Babies wins, while Madea Made is eliminated.
63	6	"Shake Showdown"	July 14, 2019	1.10	0.28
The final four face their first challenge on a beach in Fort Lauderdale, Florida. They have 30 minutes to create a brand-defining skewer using proteins chosen by throwing javelins at targets. The team with the best skewer selects one team to be their business partner for the day, which includes a shared dish and splitting the combined profits equally. NOLA Creations wins and chooses Brunch Babes as their partner, making Frank-n-Slides and Rolling Indulgence partners by default. On day two, the partnerships are dissolved. NOLA Creations, Rolling Indulgence, and the Brunch Babes all park at the same spot on the beach. Frank-N-Slides sets up separately at a mechanics' shop, where sales are slow. Teams are called by Sonic Drive-In executive Mackenzie Gibson for their second challenge. They set up a food truck park at the beach, charging $5 for admission, and sell a dessert inspired by the flavor of milkshakes delivered to them by two waitresses. Patrons vote on their favorite dessert, and the winner chooses between receiving $200 up front or receiving $25 for every vote. Brunch Babes is voted the winner and chooses the $200. Rolling Indulgence wins the episode; their partner, Frank-N-Slides, is eliminated.
64	7	"Miami Meltdown"	July 21, 2019	1.12	0.34
The final three meet Tyler and Chef Jorge Alverez of the Stuffed Cuban Restaurant on the beach of Miami, standing with a whole slow-roasted crispy pig to be used in the first challenge. To determine which part of the pig each team is given, they race to construct towers from dominoes. The team that sells the most pork dishes using this meat wins an additional $300. Brunch Babes wins this challenge. During the selling period, the three teams find different spots, though Brunch Babes tries to sell a batch of donuts at NOLA Creation's location. Also, Tyler interviews teams about the significance of a potential victory. On day two, Rolling Indulgence and Brunch Babes unsuccessfully attempt to attract a crowd to a classic car club. When that fails, Brunch Babes returns to their spot from the day before, while Rolling Indulgence still suffers from lack of patrons. In the day's challenge, teams are given Cuban coffee beans, a burr-grinder, and a moka pot. The teams must use coffee in one of their dishes, with the team selling the most coffee-infused plates winning another $300. Brunch Babes wins this challenge and the whole episode. Rolling Indulgence is eliminated.
65	8	"Key Lime Clash"	July 28, 2019	1.12	0.28
The final two teams meet Tyler and his friend Kelly at a pier in Key West. The two teams choose one of their members to blow a conch shell, and Kelly judges them according to their tone quality, creativity, and loudness. Brunch Babes wins, allowing them to choose one challenge dish they or their opponent had sold in the past to sell as a special. NOLA Creations is assigned another dish. The two teams sell their "greatest hits" special through day one. Brunch Babes wins $400 for making the most profit from their special. On day two, Tyler and Miami restaurateur Michael Schwartz come by the two trucks with crates of spiny lobster tails, with which the finalists are given one hour to prepare them a dish. NOLA Creations wins $300 for making the better dish. In the final challenge, the teams are delivered the ingredients for a key lime pie and have to use them to make a dessert that isn't a pie. The teams must sell the dessert at a minimum price of $3, and the team that sells the most desserts wins $400. NOLA Creations wins this last challenge and the whole season.

=== Season 11: Holiday Hustle (2019) ===
No. overall	No. in season	Title	Original release date	Viewers (millions)	18-49 rating
66	1	"Blizzard Brawl"	November 27, 2019	0.749	0.21
67	2	"Candy Cane Clash"	December 4, 2019	0.685	0.21
68	3	"We Three Trucks"	December 11, 2019	0.735	0.23
69	4	"New Champ in Newport"	December 18, 2019	0.652	0.17

=== Season 12: Gold Coast (2020) ===
Team name	Team members	Hometown	Cuisine	Place
Bachelor Kitchen	Stephan "Stephnos" Nicklow, John Nicklow, Billy Jenney	Austin, Texas	Tex-Mex	4
Crystal's Comfort Food	Crystal Ashby, Steve Ashby, Aleeyah West	Philadelphia, Pennsylvania	Comfort food	6
Eat My Crust	Zach Harman, Tyson Harman, Preslie Hirsch	Phoenix, Arizona	Toast	7
Lunch Ladies	Jenny DeVivo, Eli Carroll, Nisa Webster	Martha's Vineyard, Massachusetts	Mediterranean	2
Mystikka Masala	Navin Hariprasad, Andrew Pettke, Sarah Hartshorne	Dallas, Texas	Indian–Tex-Mex fusion	1
Super Sope	Carina Stringfellow, Priscilla Gutierrez, Lindsey Stringfellow	Turlock, California	Mexican	3
Team Fat Kid	Alex Carr, Jason Fossee, Jacob Dooley	Virginia Beach, Virginia	Urban American	5

No. overall	No. in season	Title	Original release date	Viewers (millions)	18–49 rating
70	1	"First-Class Food Fight"	March 26, 2020	N/A	N/A
Teams meet Tyler in a hangar at Santa Monica Airport. In the season's first challenge, the seven teams have thirty minutes to create an hors d'oeuvre. Mystikka Masala wins the challenge, $200 in their till, and a one-hour head-start on Day 1 of selling. Teams start with $400 of seed money and begin selling on Ocean Avenue by Palisades Park. During the first day, Tyler lectures Bachelor Kitchen on sanitation and threatens to relieve them of their truck if they do not maintain a clean environment. On day 2, contestants must find their own spots in Los Angeles. For the second challenge, teams must create a dish with champagne as a main ingredient. Bachelor Kitchen makes the most money from sales of this dish, which earns them immunity at elimination. Lunch Ladies wins the episode, and Eat My Crust is eliminated instead of Bachelor Kitchen.
71	2	"Food Trucks Ahoy!"	March 26, 2020	1.01	0.25
Teams convene at a yacht club in San Diego for their first challenge. The teams pair up to prepare a meal consisting of an entree, side, and signature beverage for 60 members of the club. The club guests vote Lunch Ladies and Mystikka Masala as the winners, who are then to choose one member from each of the four losing teams to sit out of the competition for two hours. During the first day of selling, most teams partner with local businesses and draw sizable crowds, but Crystal's Comfort Food is relatively unsuccessful and changes location several times. The second day begins with another challenge. The teams must create an octopus dish for their menus. The team that makes the most money from the dish wins $200. Additionally, chef Claudette Zepeda-Wilkins judges each dish and awards $200 to the team with the best dish, but not all teams are fully ready when she arrives. Super Sope has the most sales, while Team Fat Kid has the best tasting dish. Stephan of Bachelor Kitchen has to leave the show for personal reasons. Ultimately, Super Sope wins the episode, and Crystal's Comfort Food is eliminated.
72	3	"Hustle in the Heat"	April 2, 2020	N/A	0.23
The teams begin their first challenge while riding a tramcar on the Palm Springs Aerial Tramway to the top of Mount San Jacinto. They have nine minutes to create an elegant, signature salad that is then judged by Tyler and chef John Fitch. Bachelor Kitchen wins $250 for making the tastiest, most elegant, and most on-brand salad. During the first day of selling in Palm Springs, Bachelor Kitchen simplifies their menu to cope with Stephan's departure. On the second day, the teams meet Tyler at Moorten Botanical Garden and Cactarium to receive a jar of blue agave nectar for their second challenge. They must incorporate the nectar into one of their dishes, and the team that makes most money from that dish earns an extra $250. Bachelor Kitchen focuses on selling the specials and wins the challenge. During the selling period, Mariah of Season 10's Brunch Babes visits Team Fat Kid. Mystikka Masala wins the episode, and Team Fat Kid is eliminated.
73	4	"Viva Las Food Trucks!"	April 9, 2020	N/A	N/A
Teams meet Tyler at The Venetian Las Vegas, where they compete in their first challenge. They have 20 minutes to prepare a world-class in-suite meal, using a protein assigned by chance, and deliver it to The Venetian's premiere penthouse. Lunch Ladies wins $300 for having the best and most practical room service dish. Teams spend the rest of the day selling on the Las Vegas Strip. On the second day, teams receive 2.5 lbs of dark chocolate to feature in a new dish priced at $5 per plate. Lunch Ladies makes the most money from their dish, winning them an additional $300 in challenge money. Lunch Ladies wins the episode, and Bachelor Kitchen is eliminated.
74	5	"Mission Santa Barbara"	April 16, 2020	1.06	0.29
The final three meet at an avocado farm in Santa Barbara for their first challenge. The teams must pick, slice, and pit 50 ripe avocados, with the first team to do so earning a one-hour head-start. Lunch Ladies wins the challenge and begins selling first. All teams are given a second challenge to create an avocado toast dish using their avocados. Mystikka Masala limits their menu to focus solely on the challenge dish and makes the most money from that dish, earning a bonus $300 for doing so. Super Sope wins $300 for having the best tasting dish, as judged by a secret shopper, chef Aaron Olson. The next day, Tyler has the teams create watermelon dishes. The first team to make $300 off their dish earns an additional $300. Lunch Ladies wins this challenge. During the second day of selling, Mystikka and Super Sope battle for the same spot, and the Lunch Ladies sell out early. Lunch Ladies wins the episode, and Super Sope is eliminated.
75	6	"Hollywood Homecoming"	April 23, 2020	0.97	0.26
The finale begins in a winery in Los Angeles, where the teams create a sweet dish and a savory dish with two wines, Cabernet Franc and Chardonnay. Tyler and winemaker Dria Butler taste both teams' food and award $200 to their favorite dish in each category. Mystikka Masala wins both dishes, netting them $400. Teams begin selling in Venice, Los Angeles. Mystikka Masala has constant foot traffic, while Lunch Ladies' inconsistent traffic forces them to move to Venice Beach. In the second challenge, the two teams swap signature dishes. The team earning the most cash from their swapped signature dish can choose between selling on the north or south side of the city for the next day. Mystikka Masala wins and chooses South LA, leaving Lunch Ladies with North LA. During the final day of selling, teams compete in a third challenge. They create two desserts – one priced at $15 and one at $5 – made with the ingredients in tiramisu. For the dessert of each price, the team making the most money wins $200. Mystikka Masala sells more $15 desserts, and Lunch Ladies sells more $5 desserts. Mystikka Masala wins the season, and Lunch Ladies places second.

=== Season 13: All-Stars – Battle of The Bay (2021) ===
Team name	Season	Team members	Hometown	Cuisine	Place
Aloha Plate	4	Adam Tabura, Lanai Tabura, Shawn Felipe	Lānaʻi City, Hawaii; Pearl City, Hawaii	Hawaiian	4
The Lime Truck	2	Daniel Shemtob, Jesse Brockman, Mark Esposito	Irvine, California	Californian	1
The Middle Feast	5	Tommy Marudi, Daniella Marudi, Gabriel Villagrana	Los Angeles, California	Middle Eastern	5
Mystikka Masala	12	Navin Hariprasad, Andrew Pettke, Doug Long	Santa Monica, California	Indian–Tex-Mex fusion	7
NOLA Creations	10	Darrell Johnson, Aunna Johnson, Terrell Gaskin	Shreveport, Louisiana	Louisiana Creole	6
Seoul Sausage	3	Ted Kim, Yong Kim, Han Ly Hwang	Los Angeles, California	Korean	2
Waffle Love	6	Adam Terry, Jared Terry, Steven Terry	Provo, Utah	Belgian waffles	3

No. overall	No. in season	Title	Original release date
76	1	"Welcome Back, Winners"	June 6, 2021
The champions of previous seasons meet Tyler and Fernando, the head baker of Boudin Bakery. In this first challenge, the teams cut sourdough loaves into bread bowls, with one of the loaves having the keys to their food truck baked inside of them. Once a team has found their keys, they can leave to begin their race. If a bread bowl is not cut perfectly, Tyler and Fernando toss another loaf of bread onto their table. Aloha Plate was first to finish, followed by NOLA Creations, Seoul Sausage, Mystikka Masala, Waffle Love, The Lime Truck, and The Middle Feast. On the first day, Mystikka closes early, Aloha goes back shopping, and Waffle Love tries to sell to other customers. In the second challenge, teams create a bread bowl dish, which they can price however they want, and the team that makes the most money off of the dish will have their sales of it doubled. The winner was Aloha Plate, who priced their specials at $75 and sold 15. Ultimately, Aloha Plate wins the episode, and Mystikka Masala is eliminated.
77	2	"Old-School Selling"	June 13, 2021
In Napa Valley AVA, Tyler and vineyard owner Jean-Charles Boisset introduce a two-part challenge. The teams have 30 minutes to harvest Cabernet Sauvignon grapes within the vineyard. Afterwards, they meet Tyler and Jean-Charles on the rose lawn. There, one team member places the grapes into their team's crush barrel, where another stomps on them to produce juice, and the last member collects the juice into a carafe and pours it into a jar. The team to fill their jar first wins the ability to shut down another truck for an hour and make a member of the selected team into their personal assistant for that time. Seoul Sausage wins, shuts down The Lime Truck, and makes Daniel their assistant. Teams then began selling at Marina Green. Tyler had disabled all teams' social media accounts, forcing them all to promote themselves as if they were rookies. In the second challenge, a bottle of Cabernet Sauvignon arrives in the team's trucks, and they use the wine to construct a dish for Tyler to taste. Seoul Sausage makes the best-tasting dish, thus winning $500. Ultimately, The Lime Truck wins the episode, and NOLA Creations is eliminated.
78	3	"Lost in the Redwoods"	June 20, 2021
Teams meet Tyler in a redwood forest. In the first challenge, the teams use a map to locate four stations with ingredients to create a signature trail mix for a family of hikers in the Santa Cruz Mountains. Seoul Sausage makes the best trail mix; as a reward, their grocery bill is paid by Tyler, while the $350 seed money goes straight to their till. Lime Truck's food processor and Seoul Sausage's flattop break, forcing them to switch to manual prep. While other teams begin taking orders, Waffle Love makes a deal with a nursing home to do a stressful 100 waffle delivery order. In the second challenge, teams have to use the trail mix ingredients to make a dish for their menu; the team that sells the most of that dish, Aloha Plate, is immune from elimination. Ultimately, Aloha Plate wins the episode, and The Middle Feast is eliminated.
79	4	"Beach Bite Battle"	June 27, 2021
On Ocean Beach, Tyler welcomes Sonic executive Mackenzie Gibson to initiate the first challenge of the weekend. Teams create a crispy beachside snack that a group of surfers will judge; their favorite snack wins its team $300, which is added to their till. Additionally, the snacks teams create will be the only thing they sell that day, and they will be priced at $2.50. The team which sells the most snacks also earns $300 toward their till. Seoul Sausage has the best-tasting snack, while Aloha Plate sells the most snacks. Returning to the city, the teams try to find locations that fit their one menu item from the challenge. Toward the end of the day, Aloha Plate is forced to close early due to their location closing. On the second day, teams sell bread bowls right next to each other. Waffle Love forgets their groceries, forcing them to turn back. At elimination, Seoul Sausage is announced as the winner, and Aloha Plate is eliminated.
80	5	"Delivery Nightmare"	July 4, 2021
At the Chase Center, Tyler informs the teams that their trucks will be converted into delivery services for their first day. Before they begin, their menu is decided by a basketball shootout challenge in which one member must make five baskets before they can select two meats for the day’s menu. During the delivery service portion of the day, Waffle Love accidentally leaves their keys in the truck; later on, their mixers break down. The next day, the teams are back to selling off their trucks at the farmer's market located in the Chase Center. As the day progresses, teams compete with sampler packs and engage in price wars, and Seoul Sausage contends with their fridges breaking. In the episode's second challenge, teams create a healthy farm-to-truck special for Golden State Warriors Player Development Coach Aaron Miles. Miles tastes their specials and judges Waffle Love to have created the best, winning them $500 toward their till. At elimination, The Lime Truck is announced as the winner, and Waffle Love is eliminated.
81	6	"All-Star Finale"	July 11, 2021
In the final week of the season, The Lime Truck and Seoul Sausage meet Tyler at Union Square, where they are given their first challenge. Teams pick three fortune cookies that hide interesting ingredients, and they must use the ingredients in a special to be sold in Union Square. The Lime Truck receives pig’s ears, bok choy, and longan; Seoul Sausage finds chicken feet, Buddha's hand, and wood ear mushrooms. For selling the most specials, Seoul Sausage wins $400 toward their till. The first day of selling is a close contest, with a $59 difference between the teams. The next day, teams meet Tyler at one of his restaurants, Wayfare Tavern. There, they create a brand new, legacy-defining dish that is true to their name. Once they have made their signature dish, Tyler judges them according to which dish represents the team best. Seoul Sausage wins the challenge, earning them $400 toward their till. During the selling period, parents of team members show up to support. The Lime Truck wins the season, with Seoul Sausage as the runner-up.

=== Season 14: Alaska – Battle for The North (2021) ===
Team name	Team members	Hometown	Cuisine	Place
Breakfast for Dinner	Harry Poole, Kate Wurtzel, April Northdurft	St. James, New York	Breakfast	2
Meatball Mamas	Jocelyn Denson, Flora Londre, Aly Romero	Danville, California	Meatballs	4
Metro Chili	Dave Consiglio, John Sullivan, Anthony Cucurullo	Staten Island, New York	Chili con carne	6
The Oink Mobile	Heather Clauser, Tyler Clauser, Emily Clauser	Georgetown, Texas	Pork and bacon	7
Querencia Mia	Marie Yniguez, Michael Neu, Queneesha "Q" Meyers	Albuquerque, New Mexico	New Mexican	5
Some Like It Tot	Nela Edwards, Drew Cowen, Kali Cowen	Tecumseh, Oklahoma; Austin, Texas	Loaded tater tots	3
Tasty Balls	D'Ambria Jacobs, Nadia Ahmed, Misti Buard	Houston, Texas	Ball-shaped food	1

No. overall	No. in season	Title	Original release date	Viewers (millions)	18–49 rating
82	1	"Battle for the North"	March 7, 2021	N/A	N/A
83	2	"Fire and Ice"	March 14, 2021	0.74	0.20
84	3	"Alaskan Alliance"	March 21, 2021	0.66	0.16
85	4	"Gold Rush"	March 28, 2021	0.63	0.16
86	5	"Frostbite"	April 4, 2021	N/A	N/A
87	6	"Fairbanks Finale"	April 11, 2021	0.35	0.09

=== Season 15: Hottest Season Ever (2022) ===
Team name	Team members	Hometown	Cuisine	Place
Amawele's	Pamela Drew, Wendy Drew, Emma Januarie	San Francisco, California	South African	4
Eso Artisanal Pasta	AJ Sankofa, Kristina Gambarian, Matt McFadden	Morristown, New Jersey	Italian	3
Food Flight	Kate Schulz, Betsy Wallace, Grant Stevens	Atlanta, Georgia	Internationally inspired sandwiches	6
Girl's Got Balls	Shauna Fetterman, Lizzy Scudder, Carrie Jones	Fox River Grove, Illinois	Arancini	9
Maybe Cheese Born With It	David Gedert "Sugar Vermont", Mahogany Reign, Keith Logue	Toledo, Ohio	Macaroni and cheese	2
Salsa Queen	"SalsaQueen" Maharba Zapata, Jim Birch, Missy Workman	Salt Lake City, Utah	Mexican	7
Sauté Kingz	Count Thomas James Foreman, Jessica Foreman, Jesshuan Foreman	Daytona Beach, Florida	Soul food	8
Señoreata	Evanice Holz, Chely Saludado, Adri Law	Los Angeles, California	Vegan–Cuban fusion	1
Southern Pride Asian Fusion	DJ Williams, Houston Greenlee, Gio Palacio	Colorado Springs, Colorado	Southern–Asian fusion	5

No. overall	No. in season	Title	Original release date	Viewers (millions)	18–49 rating
88	1	"Laguna Beach Heat"	June 5, 2022	N/A	N/A
The nine teams meet at Laguna Beach. In the first challenge, teams create a dish using their choice of chili peppers with various heat intensities. Amawele's wins $400 for creating the tastiest dish. While shopping for supplies, Food Flight buys a bakery's entire stock of hoagie rolls, Girl's Got Balls goes over budget, Southern Pride becomes lost, and Amawele's loses time searching for a specialty grocery store. Florence later advises Amawale’s to simplify their menu. At the teams’ joint spot a half-mile from the beach, Sugar's salesmanship attracts many customers despite customers' negative reception of his food. On the second day, the teams find their own locations, but many park at the same grocery store. In the second challenge, teams sell a special inspired by one of their competitors' dishes from the first challenge. Amawele's can sell their own dish because they won the first challenge. Maybe Cheese Born With It wins an additional $400 by making the most money off their special. Salsa Queen copies Señoreata's promotion style, causing tension between the two trucks, as several trucks feel conflicted about menu prices. Ultimately, Maybe Cheese Born With It wins the episode, and Girl's Got Balls is eliminated.
89	2	"Hot Season, Cold Location"	June 12, 2022	0.52	0.10
Teams meet Florence at Dodger Stadium. In the first challenge, teams sell alongside two-time show winners The Lime Truck. The team that comes closest to The Lime Truck's sales wins $500. If a team manages to outsell The Lime Truck, they become immune from elimination. While the teams begin their prep, Lime Truck opens early and begins selling. Salsa Queen unsuccessfully attempts to promote their food to those waiting in line. Many teams take orders while they are still prepping. Amawele's and Maybe Cheese's loud personalities attract customers, while Eso's Artisinal Pasta and Sauté Kingz's longer prep times cost them sales. Amawele's notices unfinished food from the other trucks in the garbage while their containers are cleaned out. Señoreata came closest to The Lime Truck's sales, thus earning an additional $500. The following day, teams travel to the San Fernando Valley for the second challenge, during which they create a dish inspired by one of three smoothies from Tropical Smoothie Cafe. The team that sells the most specials earns $300. Most teams struggle to find a good location. Southern Pride Asian Fusion wins the challenge. Ultimately, Señoreata wins the episode, and Sauté Kingz is eliminated.
90	3	"No Time to Swap"	June 19, 2022	0.94	0.19
Teams meet Florence and celebrity chef Antonia Lofaso on the Venice Beach Boardwalk. Teams create a signature dish in thirty minutes, and the dish Florence and Lafosa like best wins the team $200. Additionally, the winning team can stay together on the second day, while the other teams swap one member. Eso Artisanal Pasta wins the challenge. In the city, teams are challenged to incorporate hemp into an existing menu dish. The team that sells the most hemp specials earns $400. Señoreata wins the challenge after selling the same number of specials as Amawele's for $12 more per special. On the second day, teams sell on Abbot Kinney Boulevard. The team swap from the first challenge distresses SalsaQueen, who leaves her truck and cannot be found. Consequently, the Salsa Queen team withdraws from the competition. Señoreata, who was supposed to swap with Salsa Queen, competes with two team members for the second day and ultimately wins the episode.
91	4	"Teams Fall Apart From Within"	June 26, 2022	0.85	0.17
At Redondo Beach, teams meet Florence and Season 3 champions Seoul Sausage. In the first challenge, teams create dosirak lunch boxes, and the team whose box Seoul Sausage thinks looks the best receives $200. Additionally, the first team to sell twelve boxes on the boardwalk for $10 each wins $200. Amawele's has the best-looking box, while Southern Pride Asian Fusion sold their boxes the fastest. Once they begin selling, Grant of Food Flight becomes frustrated by his team’s inefficiency. Meanwhile, Eso and Maybe Cheese Born With It take Florence’s recipe advice from previous episodes. Señoreata is upset by Eso’s promotion of fried chicken in front of potential customers. The restaurant that Food Flight parked in front of is unhappy with their presence, which causes tension between the team members. Grant feels that his kitchen skills are being questioned, prompting Florence to intervene to ease tensions. In the second challenge, teams use almond milk to create a creamy dish. Customers who try their dishes rate them, and the team with the highest reviews wins $300. Southern Pride Asian Fusion wins the challenge and the episode, and Food Flight is eliminated.
92	5	"Who Are the Secret Eaters?"	July 3, 2022	0.74	0.13
Teams meet in Manhattan Beach. In the first challenge, teams create an appetizer, entrée, and dessert based on three of six different cuisines: Chinese, Thai, Jamaican, French, Indian, and Persian. They sell these items as part of their regular menu for the day. Secret judges award $300 to the best appetizer, $400 to the best entree, and $200 to the best dessert. Amawele's has the best entrée, while Eso Artisanal Pasta has both the best appetizer and dessert. As the teams began their prep, Amawele's struggles with communication as they park their truck in a sub-optimal location. Southern Pride and Señoreata accidentally park on private property and must change locations. After hitting a pothole, Maybe Cheese Born With It tears their gas pipeline, temporarily forcing them to use their flattop grill. DJ's family visits Southern Pride at the end of the day. The next day, Florence announces the second challenge. Teams must compete for $300 by creating the best post-workout recovery pairing of a snack and drink for volleyball players on the beach. Amawele’s wins the challenge and the episode, and Southern Pride Asian Fusion is eliminated.
93	6	"Dunes Day"	July 10, 2022	0.80	0.17
Florence meets teams at the Glamis Dunes, the largest natural dune park in the US. For the first day, teams are limited to a single protein. Team race on sandboards to determine their choice of protein. In Boardmanville, Florence encourages teams to advertise at the local trailer park campgrounds. Maybe Cheese Born With It takes orders long before finishing food preparation; Amawele’s copies this strategy. When Señoreata's long ticket times force customers to buy food from other trucks, Florence advises that they trim their menu. The heat and pressure exhaust Wendy and Keith of Maybe Cheese Born With It. The next day, Maybe Cheese again takes orders before finishing preparation, and Keith briefly leaves the truck. In the second challenge, teams create an innovative dish between two buns. Florence’s favorite dish earns $200 for the team. In addition, the team that sells the most specials also wins $200. Amawele's wins the tasting portion, while Señoreata wins the selling portion. Ultimately, Maybe Cheese Born With It wins the episode, and Amawele’s is eliminated.
94	7	"Close to the Finish Line"	July 17, 2022	0.80	0.15
At the Grand Prix of Long Beach, teams meet Florence and Sonic executive Scott Uehlin. Teams have 30 minutes to produce as many Coney Island hot dog–inspired dishes as possible to feed the pit crews at the Grand Prix. Florence and Scott judge their dishes and select the two that taste the best. Between these two teams, the team that sells the most units earns an hour's head start to begin selling. Maybe Cheese Born With It and Eso Artisanal Past’s dishes are judged to taste the best, and Eso Artisanal Pasta sells the most units. Later, a crowd forms at Señoreata's truck, and they eventually run out of supplies. Eso Artisanal Pasta and Maybe Cheese Born With It set up at the same park, and a pride parade boosts the latter’s sales. The following day, Eso and Maybe Cheese move to the beach during the lunch rush but relocate due to slow foot traffic. In the second challenge, teams create a dish inspired by chicken and waffles; the team that sells the most specials earns triple the value of their sales of that special. Señoreata wins the challenge and the episode, and Eso Artisinal Pasta is eliminated.
95	8	"San Diego Showdown"	July 24, 2022	0.88	0.18
The final two meet in San Diego. In the first challenge, teams sell a special based on their competitor's best-selling menu item. Señoreata wins $200 for making the most money off their special, and Florence awards $200 to Maybe Cheese Born With It for their better-tasting dish. At Ballast Point Brewing Company, the teams struggle to keep up with a large crowd. In the second challenge, teams make a special to pair with the company’s speedboat ale. Señoreata wins $300 by selling the most specials. Señoreata runs out of supplies and must go shopping again. Once Señoreata returns, Sugar notices Señoreata's comparatively low prices. On the second day, the finalists inadvertently park together in Little Italy. A friend of Evanice notifies Señoreata of Maybe Cheese's high-priced sampler plate, and Señoreata soon creates their own. In the final challenge, Florence and Tijuana chef Ruffo Ibarra arrive at the finalists' trucks with various chiles; teams must use one in a new menu special. Florence and Ibarra award $300 to the team whose dish has the best balance of heat and flavor, Maybe Cheese Born With It. Ultimately, Señoreata wins the season, and Maybe Cheese Born with it places second.

=== Season 16: David vs. Goliath (2023) ===
Team name	Experience	Team members	Hometown	Cuisine	Place
2 Girls Jamaican Tacos	Rookies	Shelly Flash, Bri Laboss, Elijah McPhie	Brooklyn, New York	Jamaican-inspired tacos	6
4 Hens Creole Kitchen	Rookies	Brandi Artis, Brittany Artis, Zendrix Berndt-White	St. Louis, Missouri	Louisiana Creole	8
The Block	Rookies	Terry Anthony, Carl Harris, Crystal Kilgore	Indianapolis, Indiana	Urban American	9
Da Bald Guy	Pros	James Martin, Missy Rabaino, Ali'i Pukahi	Honolulu, Hawaii	Hawaiian	4
D'Pura Cepa	Pros	Jose Carnot, Janshanic Santos, Louis Del Rio Rubio	Miami, Florida	Puerto Rican	3
The Easy Vegan	Rookies	Alexi Mandolini, Taylor Herbert, Matt Heikkila	Denver, Colorado	Vegan	1
Khana	Rookies	Maryam Khan, Al Jane, Jake Nielsen	Detroit, Michigan	Pakistani–American fusion	2
Lisa's Crêperie	Pros	Lisa Thiffault, Miranda Moore, Ally Marlow	Atlanta, Georgia	Crêperie	5
Paisani	Pros	Matthew Minichiello, Ryan Palmer, Tommy Southwick	Boston, Massachusetts	Italian-American	7

No. overall	No. in season	Title	Original release date	Viewers (millions)	18–49 rating
96	1	"This Is Food Truck Heaven?"	June 18, 2023	0.76	0.10
Four veteran food trucks (pros) compete against five novice teams (rookies) across Los Angeles. The nine teams meet Tyler at Pershing Square and are immediately given their first challenge.: The teams have 30 minutes to cook Tyler their best signature dish. The winner would earn either all the Pros or Rookies an extra hour to sell on the first day. The winner was Da Bald Guy, earning the Pros the extra hour.; Teams begin their first day selling on a reserved block off Melrose Avenue. The Block mock Paisani's challenge dish for its simplicity, while Khana takes issue with Lisa's Crêperie's promotion attempts. The following day, the teams sell at Echo Park Lake, a challenging location due to a fence separating the park from the sidewalk. Tyler later called in and offered the teams $300 if they wanted to relocate and did not return to the park. 4 Hens Creole Kitchen, The Easy Vegan, and Khana decide to leave. Meanwhile, those who stayed behind chose to shut down early after selling out; in the commotion, an accident occurred between The Block and Paisani's trucks when the former was leaving. Ultimately, Da Bald Guy was announced as the top seller, while The Block was eliminated.
97	2	"Meet Mookie"	June 25, 2023	0.84	0.14
The teams meet at a little league baseball field in Woodland Hills, where Tyler introduces them to the special judge of their first challenge: Los Angeles Dodgers fielder Mookie Betts.: The teams have 30 minutes to create an elevated ballpark menu for 150 Little League players and their families. Each guest has four tickets they could use at four trucks of their choice; the team that received the most tickets would win not only immunity from elimination but also $15,000 in prize money, courtesy of Wells Fargo. Additionally, Tyler and Mookie would taste each truck's dish, with the dish that Mookie liked best earning that team and either all pros or rookies an extra hour to sell the following day. The Easy Vegan won the sales portion, while Paisani won the taste portion, giving the Pros the extra hour.; The next day, the teams find their own locations. Some teams find success in drawing a crowd, such as Da Bald Guy and The Easy Vegan. Others, however, could barely even find a stable stop, like 4 Hen's Creole Kitchen, Lisa's Crêperie, and Paisani. Tyler later calls the teams to give them another challenge.: The teams must create and sell a new dish using what they currently have on their truck, pricing it no less than $15. The team that sells the most units of their dish would earn $300 in their till. The winner was The Easy Vegan.; Given a third day to sell, Shelly struggles to stay conscious in the heat, Khana struggles to communicate, and 4 Hens Creole Kitchen is criticized on social media by an unsatisfied customer. At elimination, Da Bald Guy was the top seller for the second consecutive week, while 4 Hens Creole Kitchen was eliminated.
98	3	"Team-plosion"	July 2, 2023	N/A	N/A
Tyler encourages the teams to garner followings and increase prices at a reasonable level; as such, he gives them a challenge to see if they could do just that.: The teams compete to have the single highest-valued ticket of the day; whoever earns that ticket can choose to stay together the next day, while other teams must swap one of their team members with one from another team of their choice. Additionally, Tyler gives each team Almond Breeze almond milk to create a new dish for their menu. At least one dish incorporating almond milk must be on the ticket to be considered. The winner was Lisa's Crêperie, who chose to remain together. Meanwhile, The Easy Vegan (Taylor) swaps with Da Bald Guy (Missy), Khana (Jake) swaps with Paisani (Tommy), and 2 Girls Jamaican Tacos (Bri) swaps with D'Pura Cepa (Louis).; After the challenge, teams are sent into the city. Within Khana, Maryam and Al discuss their communication issues with Jake, which have hindered their productivity despite their relative success. During the day, actor Kumail Nanjiani and writer Emily V. Gordon stop by each truck. The next day, the teams are selling side-by-side when Tyler calls in with a curveball of a challenge.: Each team must create a two-entrée special intended to be shared by two people. The team that sells the most specials would win $300 towards their till. The winner was Da Bald Guy.; At elimination, Tyler addresses Khana's recent dysfunction, and after a discussion with the producer, Maryam decides to release Jake – something he did not expect. Ultimately, Da Bald Guy won their third consecutive week, while Paisani was eliminated.
99	4	"Can They Do That?"	July 2, 2023	N/A	N/A
Many teams lose respect for Khana following Jake's departure as they meet Tyler and chef Antonia Lofaso at Scopa Italian Roots. Maryam reveals she hired Carl from The Block as a replacement team member but had to pay $219 for his plane ticket. Tyler then debriefs the first challenge.: Each team must choose one of six presented dishes from Scopa to use as inspiration for a dish to be judged by Tyler and Antonia. They chose in order from first to last from the previous week. The dish Tyler and Antonia liked the best earns that team $300 in their till and the ability to shut down any truck for an hour the next day. The winner was Khana, who would shut down Lisa's Crêperie.; Following the challenge, teams then sell in the parking lot of Scopa as normal, though Lisa's Crêperie struggled to maintain a steady line. At the start of the second day, Tyler calls in with their second challenge, continuing the theme of inspiration.: The teams had to create a dish inspired by one from a rival truck. They chose in order from last to first from the previous week. The team that sells the most of this dish would win $400 in their till. The winner was D'Pura Cepa.; At elimination, for the fourth week in a row, Da Bald Guy was the top seller; 2 Girls Jamaican Tacos was eliminated.
100	5	"Ready, Jet, Go"	July 9, 2023	N/A	N/A
The teams meet Tyler and celebrity chef Jet Tila in Grand Park as they begin their first challenge.: The teams had to create their version of the dish that inspired them to enter food service. Tyler and Jet would taste each dish and award $300 to the team whose dish they liked most. They would also sell this dish as a special during the day, with the team that sold the most specials earning the right to shut down two teams of their choice for one hour at any time the next day. The Easy Vegan won the taste portion, while D'Pura Cepa won the selling portion; they chose to shut down Da Bald Guy and Lisa's Crêperie.; The feud between Khana and Lisa's Crêperie intensifies as they sell across from each other. As food traffic in Grand Park is few and far between, Tyler gives the teams the option to leave, which all but Lisa's Crêperie and D'Pura Cepa do. The next day, the teams drive to Ballast Point Brewing Company in Long Beach, when Tyler calls them with the details of their next challenge.: The teams choose an alcoholic beverage representing their heritage to incorporate into a new menu special. Whichever team sold the most specials would win $400. The winner was The Easy Vegan.; Once again, Khana and Lisa's Crêperie set up next to each other. The former teams up with The Easy Vegan to steal potential customers from the latter. At elimination, The Easy Vegan was announced as the top seller, while Lisa's Crêperie was eliminated.
101	6	"Family Food"	July 16, 2023	N/A	N/A
At the Smorgasburg food festival, the teams meet Evanice Holz, head chef of season 15 winners Señoreata, who acted as the judge for their first challenge: The teams must create a plant-based variation of a family recipe for Tyler and Evanice to taste; the team whose dish Evanice liked most was awarded $300. They must then sell their plant-based dishes throughout the day at the festival; the team that sells the most units can choose their business partner for the second day. The Easy Vegan won both parts of the challenge, choosing to partner with D'Pura Cepa, meaning Da Bald Guy and Khana were partnered by default.; Da Bald Guy attempts to use Hawaiian drums to attract customers, which raises sales for all teams. On the second day, the partnered teams must split their combined revenues equally. At the Grand Central Market, rainy conditions hamper sales as Tyler drops by the trucks with another challenge: The teams would pick out a Southern comfort food recipe from Tyler's collection to inspire a menu special. The team whose dish Tyler liked best would win $200, while the team that makes the most money from their Southern-inspired specials would also win $200. Da Bald Guy won the taste portion, and D'Pura Cepa won the selling portion.; At elimination, D'Pura Cepa was announced as the top seller, while Da Bald Guy was eliminated.
102	7	"Need for Speed"	July 23, 2023	N/A	N/A
The final three teams meet Tyler at MacArthur Park. Carl of Khana is out sick, leaving Maryam and Al to work on the truck. Chef Joe Sasto is brought in to judge the first challenge.: Teams had to create a new entrée special they can make quickly; the first team to sell five specials earns $200. Tyler and Joe would also taste each team's entrée and award $200 to the team with the best dish. The Easy Vegan won both parts of the challenge.; Khana struggles as a two-person team, while The Easy Vegan quickly gains a following due to their broader appeal in Los Angeles. On the second day, teams sell at the First Fridays food truck festival on Abbot Kinney Boulevard, which also features two-time Great Food Truck Race winners The Lime Truck, who were a key part of the second challenge.: The teams must create an innovative special for their menu; the first team to sell 20 specials would earn $200. Additionally, Daniel Shemtob of The Lime Truck would stop by to offer teams advice and sample their special, giving another $200 to the team whose dish he likes the best. The Easy Vegan won the selling portion, while Khana won the taste portion.; Ultimately, Khana was announced as the top seller, while D'Pura Cepa was ultimately eliminated.
103	8	"Final Showdown"	July 30, 2023	N/A	N/A
Rookie teams Khana and The Easy Vegan meet Tyker at a scenic viewpoint overlooking Los Angeles before driving to the Regarding Her Food Festival to partake in their first challenge: The final two teams would "steal" one dish from the other team's menu and sell their unique version of it. The team that sells the most stolen specials would earn $200. The winner was Khana.; As they begin to settle in, Tyler suddenly appears with a list of ten cooking techniques as part of the second challenge of the day: Tyler had both teams create a special using at least two techniques from the list provided. Their dishes were judged by three chefs on the Regarding Her board, who awarded $200 to the team with the best dish. The winner was Khana.; Caught up with Tyler's challenges, The Easy Vegan struggles to keep their electricity on, while Khana runs low on supplies; both of which risk them losing customers. On their final day of sales, both teams park in locations tied to their core demographics. While The Easy Vegan gains a large crowd, including visits from Alexi and Matt's families, Khana is relatively unsuccessful at a usually reliable spot. Eventually, Tyler calls the teams for their third and final challenge.: The teams were limited to selling one entrée on their menu, with additional sides, drinks, and desserts. The team making the most money from their entrée would earn $200, and the entrée that Tyler liked the most also earned $200. The Easy Vegan won both parts of the challenge.; The final two meet back with Tyler at the same location from the beginning of the episode. Ultimately, The Easy Vegan wins the season, and Khana leaves as the runners-up.

=== Season 17: Games on The Gulf (2024) ===
Team name	Squad	Team members	Hometown	Cuisine	Place
Argentina's Empanadas	Stripes	Carolina Freeman, Chad Freeman, Paola Mentis	Wichita, Kansas	Argentine, especially empanadas	3
Bao Bei	Stars	Kevin Hsieh, Zakary Keres, Cody Hoover	Washington, D.C.	Taiwanese	2
Cooks with Passion	Stripes	Andrew Bernadine, Terry Jones, Jasmine Smith	Atlanta, Georgia	Caribbean-inspired Southern	8
Down to Get Tacos	Stars	Karina Wollangk, Kiana Gudino-Wollangk, Oz Gudino	Gilbert, Arizona	Tacos	7
Fishnet	Stripes	Ferhat Yalcin, Keyia Yalcin, Uswa McDowell	Baltimore, Maryland	Mediterranean, especially seafood	4
Kalye	N/A	Rob Mallari-D’Auria, Barry Jacinto, Mark "Bessie" Besanna	New York, New York	Filipino	9
Plates on Deck	Stars	Ken James, Ziomara Taveras, Samuel Jenkins	Lakeland, Florida	Soul food	6
SOLA Po'Boys	Stars	Randy Butler, Serrano Barnes, Barenese Butler	Los Angeles, California	Cajun	5
Wally's Waffles	Stripes	Wally Strzepka, Maggie Strzepka, Joe Caiafa	Chicago, Illinois	Belgian waffles	1

No. overall	No. in season	Title	Original release date
104	1	"Let the Games Begin"	June 30, 2024
The nine teams meet Tyler Florence at the Johnson Space Center in Houston, where they are immediately given their first ever challenge.: The teams have 40 minutes to make a unique and defining dish for Tyler. The top three teams would earn medals (gold, silver, and bronze) worth $300, $200, and $100, respectively, which would go towards their final total. The top three were Down to Get Tacos (Bronze – $100), Plates on Deck (Silver – $200), and Cooks with Passion (Gold – $300).; The teams begin their first day selling downtown with general success, except for Cooks with Passion, who got lost and ended up making no sales. The next day, chef Misti Buard of Tasty Balls, the winners of season 13, is brought in to judge a surprise early elimination task.: Bao Bei and Kalye were the bottom two teams from the previous day and were forced to compete in a 30-minute cook-off judged by Buard to avoid elimination. The winner was Bao Bei, and thus, Kalye was eliminated.; Before sending the teams out to sell, Tyler splits them into two squads under the direction of the previous day’s top two sellers, Wally's Waffles and Plates on Deck. These squads are meant to help each team, among other things, find locations and strategize for challenges, one of which they were given after the squads were decided. The squads are: Stripes Squad: Wally's Waffles, Cooks with Passion, Argentina's Empanadas, and Fishnet Stars Squad: Plates on Deck, SOLA Po'Boys, Bao Bei, and Down to Get Tacos: The two squads must sell five plates from all teams' trucks; customers must be given the correct order, and teams can promote their squad members once they've sold their plates. The squad that sells five plates off all their trucks first wins $100 per truck. The winners were the Stripes Squad.; At elimination, Tyler reveals that, like the first challenge, the top three sellers each week would receive medals worth money that becomes part of their till for the following week. The top three this week were Fishnet (Bronze – $100), Plates on Deck (Silver – $200), and Wally's Waffles (Gold – $300). As Kalye was previously eliminated, no other elimination took place, although Bao Bei was in last place.
105	2	"Justin Time"	July 7, 2024
The teams meet in historic Galveston, where Tyler greets them with a special challenge with a surprise guest: Major League Baseball infielder Justin Turner.: The teams must quickly create their version of a classic ballpark dish, which they feed to a group of Little League baseball players, Tyler, and Justin. Teams first must feed four little league players; the first four teams to reach this threshold would then serve Tyler and Justin, the latter awarding $15,000 in prize money (courtesy of Wells Fargo) to the team whose dish he likes most. Down to Get Tacos, SOLA Po'Boys, Bao Bei, and Argentina's Empanadas were the top four, with Bao Bei winning overall.; The following day, the teams sell downtown in hot, humid conditions several feet from the water. After overcoming some hurdles, Tyler calls in with their next challenge.: Each squad chooses one team to sell a dish featuring northern red snapper. The team that makes the most sales from their dish earns their squad $800 to split between them. SOLA Po'Boys represented the Stars Squad while Fishnet represented the Stripes Squad; Fishnet won and split the prize evenly with the Stripes Squad ($200 each).; Given an extra day to sell anywhere, the teams end up several feet apart at an intersection, as another challenge was given.: The teams needed to sell a dish they had not made before, with the team that sold the most of their dish winning $300 towards their till; The winner was SOLA Po'Boys.; At elimination, the top three sellers were Down to Get Tacos (Bronze – $100), Fishnet (Silver – $200), and Wally's Waffles (Gold – $300); Cooks with Passion was eliminated.
106	3	"Pirates' Booty"	July 14, 2024
In Lake Charles, Louisiana, the teams meet Tyler on the banks of Contraband Bayou, where he gives a brief history of pirate Jean Lafitte before announcing their first challenge.: The teams had three minutes to steal an ingredient from other trucks to use in a dish; all ingredients must be used. Local chefs and food service workers dressed as pirates would come by to sample their dishes and award the team they believed had the best dish $500 for their till. The winner was Argentina's Empanadas.; During the challenge, one team causes cross-contamination between milk and seafood on Plates on Deck's truck. After Ken is unable to find out who did it, he throws one of his pirated ingredients away in anger, forfeiting the challenge. Plates on Deck briefly crumble before Tyler gives a pep talk that resets their moods. The following day, the teams sell on their own, but coincidentally convene back at Millennium Park, where they receive a second challenge hidden in their trucks.: In this optional challenge, teams find a bottle on their truck with a treasure map. Teams that pursue the challenge would discover a treasure chest of Bayou rum for use in a new menu item. The team that made the most money off the dish won $500. SOLA Po'Boys, Fishnet, Bao Bei, and Down to Get Tacos competed in the challenge; the winner was Bao Bei.; At elimination, camera footage revealed Wally's Waffles had caused the cross-contamination on Plates on Deck's truck. The top three sellers were Wally's Waffles (Bronze – $100), Bao Bei (Silver – $200), and Plates on Deck (Gold – $300); Down to Get Tacos was eliminated.
107	4	"Highway Robbery"	July 21, 2024
The weekend begins with all teams selling on the coast of Biloxi, Mississippi, where Tyler gives them a challenge based on a local staple.: The teams create their take on a comeback sauce to serve with their protein that day. Tyler would taste each dish and double the sales of the dish he liked best for the winning team. The winner was Bao Bei, whose $750 in sales doubled to earn them $1500.; Fishnet would opt out of this challenge, believing it would back up their progress. Conversely, new menu items slow food prep for some teams, and Argentina's Empanadas experiences intense internal conflict. On the second day, the teams may go wherever they want, but each squad sells together to gather large crowds. Coincidentally, both squads chose the same location as Tyler calls in with another challenge.: Teams must create a new special utilizing fresh shrimp. Every team member must peel and devein the shrimp given to them before they can prep and take orders. The winners would receive $500 for selling the most shrimp specials. The winner was Bao Bei.; Once again, Fishnet skips this challenge due to Uswa being allergic to shrimp. At elimination, Florence reads several customers' complaints about price gouging and small portions, lecturing them on knowing their audience in each city they visit. The top three sellers were Fishnet (Bronze – $100), Bao Bei (Silver – $200), and Argentina’s Empanadas (Gold – $300); Plates on Deck was eliminated.
108	5	"Attack of the Tag Teams"	July 28, 2024
At The Shed BBQ restaurant in Pascagoula, Mississippi, Tyler introduces professional wrestling tag teams The Acclaimed and The Gunns to the teams who would help them with their first challenge.: Teams from each squad have 45 minutes to prep their menus; The Gunns worked with the Stars Squad, while The Acclaimed worked with the Stripes Squad. Only one person can work on each truck and must "tag out" to another teammate every 5 minutes. After the 45 minutes were up and the teams began selling, the squad with the greater sales average between their teams would win $200 for each truck. The winner was Stripes Squad.; While The Acclaimed and The Gunns help draw in business, some teams are unhappy with menu plagiarism by their competitors. The following day, in the nearby city of Ocean Springs, the teams could freely choose their locations. After the lunch rush, Tyler sends the trucks to the fairgrounds to sell as part of a local food truck festival, while relaying their second challenge to them.: The teams must create their version of a hot tamale, with the team that sells the most tamales receiving $500. The winner was Fishnet.; Bao Bei and Wally's Waffles opt out of the challenge, wanting to focus on what they do best rather than be slowed down by a product that doesn't fit them or they don't like. At elimination, the top three sellers were Fishnet (Bronze – $100), Wally's Waffles (Silver – $200), and Argentina’s Empanadas (Gold – $300); SOLA Po'Boys was eliminated.
109	6	"Mardi Gras Moola"	August 4, 2024
By now, the squad portion of the race has ended as the teams meet Tyler in Mardi Gras Park in Mobile, Alabama during Mardi Gras.: The teams must create a special using crayfish; the team that sells the most specials in an hour would gain a personal shopper they could call on for the weekend. Additionally, Tyler and local chef Panini Pete would taste the crayfish specials and award $500 to the team with the best dish. Argentina's Empanadas won the selling portion while Bao Bei won the taste portion.; Sales during the first day are generally low, as the partying crowd either has their own food or prefers local restaurants compared to what the teams have to offer. The following day, the teams may park anywhere but end up selling next to each other. As they begin selling, however, Chad messages Wally and Ferhat, accusing Bao Bei of cheating based on a customer's account (Bao Bei had paid their daughter to purchase from them). Believing the allegation is false, Wally's Waffles later partners with Bao Bei to promote both trucks; Fishnet, meanwhile, calls food from Argentina's Empanadas pre-packaged. Tyler later comes by each truck to give them their next challenge.: Tyler gifts each team a king cake, courtesy of Pollman's Bakery, with a medal worth $300 randomly baked into one of them. They must deconstruct and use their king cake in a new menu special, with the team that makes the most from their specials earning $200. Bao Bei would find the medal, while Wally's Waffles made the most money from their special.; As Tyler delivered each team their king cake, he was alerted to the accusations levied at Bao Bei by Argentina's Empanadas, leading him to investigate. Ultimately, however, nothing of the sort appeared on camera or by the production staff's accounts. At elimination, the final three were revealed as Wally's Waffles (Bronze – $100), Argentina’s Empanadas (Silver – $200), and Bao Bei (Gold – $300), meaning that Fishnet was eliminated.
110	7	"Beach Battle Royale"	August 11, 2024
The final three meet Tyler on the boardwalk of Panama City Beach, where he debriefs them on their first challenge.: The teams have 30 minutes to make a boardwalk snack that is either in a cone, in a bag, or on a stick. Bao Bei chose "stick", Argentina's Empanadas chose "bag", and Wally's Waffles chose "cone". The first team to sell 20 orders of their snack would win $300. Tyler also sampled their snack and awarded $500 to the team with the best-tasting snack. Argentina's Empanadas won the selling portion while Bao Bei won the taste portion.; On the morning of the second day, Tyler sends the teams to a local farmer's market to sell, encouraging them to focus on their best-selling items. After the market ends, the teams set up in central downtown during the rainy afternoon, as Tyler sets up the premise of their next challenge with some familiar faces.: Tyler calls the teams to inform them that Season 10 winners Darrell and Aunna Johnson of NOLA Creations had secretly studied them for their customer experience and had tasted each team’s signature dish. Wally's Waffles had the best customer experience, earning the opportunity to shut down a team (Argentina's Empanadas) for one hour. The team with the best-tasting dish was Bao Bei, and they would win $500.; At elimination, Bao Bei was announced as the top seller, while Argentina’s Empanadas was ultimately eliminated.
111	8	"South Beach Showdown"	August 18, 2024
Bao Bei and Wally's Waffles meet Tyler on a beach in Fort Myers, where they are greeted by a large crowd. Tyler reveals they will only have one day to sell in the city, surprising both teams, while also giving them the details of their first challenge.: The final two must create a combo that uses Florida oranges in a drink, entree, and dessert, with the team that sells the most combos winning $300. The winner was Bao Bei.; Free to choose their locations, Wally's Waffles begins selling early, while Bao Bei spends more time preparing their challenge special. Maggie's daughter, Natalia, visits Wally's Waffles by surprise. The next day, Tyler directs the teams to Miami and the annual Food Network South Beach Wine and Food Festival for what will be their final sale day and second challenge.: The teams had to create and sell a gourmet bite to the 2,500 people at the festival, who voted for their favorite bite with a $1 token; the team with the most tokens won the challenge. The winner was Wally's Waffles.; Backed by a complete kitchen team, Wally's Waffles and Bao Bei frantically compete for every customer's token, just before Tyler calls in for their final challenge of the season.: Both teams needed to make a dish representing who they are as both people and chefs. Tyler and three Food Network celebrity chefs – Maneet Chauhan, Aarti Sequeira, and Jeff Mauro – would come by to judge both dishes, with the winner being awarded $500 towards their till. The winner was Bao Bei.; After the festival ended, Tyler meets the final two one last time presenting two medal cases, one containing a gold medal and one a silver medal. Ultimately, Wally’s Waffles wins the season, and Bao Bei leaves as the runners-up.

=== Season 18: Truckin' Awesome (2025) ===
Team name	Team members	Hometown	Cuisine	Place
Burger Walla	Kai Campbell, Luis De La Cruz, Leigh Soriano	Newark, New Jersey	Indian-inspired burgers	7
Cooking with Que	Quiana Rice, Ari Minott, Reagan Sidney	Detroit, Michigan	Vegan–soul food fusion	3
Eat My Biscuits	Vanetta Roy, Kedric Barrett, Chaya Conwell	East Point, Georgia	Biscuits	9
Fat Kid Food Co.	Chaz McKenna, Tristan Keroles, Tristan "Milkshake" Compton	Ashland, Oregon	Pacific Rim-inspired comfort food	5
G's Cheesesteaks	Giacomo "Jack" Pisano, Derek Booras, Antonio Locke	Staten Island, New York	Urban American	6
Good Fortune Company	Arturo Leighton, Sarah Cai, Christopher Fuse	Memphis, Tennessee	Chinese	2
Nishaan	Zeeshan Bakhrani, Naoufal Bahloul, Vidya Velayutham	Brooklyn, New York	Pakistani–American fusion	1
Rising Tiger	Devin Keopraphay, Ashley Morris, Orian Muniz	Longmont, Colorado	Asian-inspired diner food	8
Stop Drop N Roll	Mai-Linh Nguyen, Sarah Marable, Colleen Cooke	Jersey City, New Jersey	Vietnamese, especially spring rolls	4

No. overall	No. in season	Title	Original release date
112	1	"Surviving Savannah"	August 3, 2025
The nine teams meet Tyler Florence in Savannah, where they're immediately given their first challenge.: Teams had 30 minutes to make Tyler their signature dish, with the best dish earning that team $300 in their till. The winner was Rising Tiger. G's Cheesesteaks also received $150 for having the second-best dish.; Selling at a joint location, many teams faced difficulties from mechanical issues to locating the proper ingredients. By the final hour of service, the Savannah Bananas baseball team came by as Tyler announced their next challenge.: Teams needed to feature bananas in an existing dish, with the team that sold the most dishes being allowed to sell for an extra hour. The winner was Rising Tiger.; G's Cheesesteaks backed out of the challenge, not wanting to sell an item they didn't like. The following day, Eat My Biscuits, Nishaan, and Burger Walla were revealed as the current bottom sellers, so a special challenge with a crucial reward was held.: The bottom three had 30 minutes to make Tyler an innovative dish, and the winner would earn immunity from elimination. The winner was Burger Walla.; At elimination, Nishaan was revealed as the top seller. Burger Walla had the lowest sales but were spared due to winning immunity. Ultimately, Eat My Biscuits was eliminated. However, Devin revealed that due to personal reasons, Rising Tiger would also be withdrawing from the race.
113	2	"Crushing Charleston"	August 10, 2025
The seven teams meet Tyler in Charleston, who was joined by the judge for the first challenge, Chef Kardea Brown.: Teams had to give Kardea their spin on one of seven presented Gullah-Geechee dishes – shrimp and grits, Hoppin' John, Charleston red rice, fried corn cakes, okra soup, perloo, or Carolina crab rice. They chose their dish in the order they finished last week. The best dish would earn that team $300 for their till. The winner was Fat Kid Food Co..; At Burger Walla, the truck's lack of burners frustrates Kai, leaving them unable to prepare their challenge dish. As such, they forfeited the challenge. The next day, the teams had to find their locations – some finding spots sooner than others. G's Cheesesteaks notably struggled to find a stable location. Tyler later called to give them their second challenge.: Teams would sell their take on a Lowcountry boil, with the team that sold the most dishes receiving an extra hour to sell for the day. The winner was Good Fortune Company.; After witnessing a minor road accident, the final day sees the teams together on a rainy day in nearby Folly Beach. Before they begin, however, Tyler gives a challenge with a guest judge, barbecue pitmaster Rodney Scott.: Teams had to sell a new menu item using Rodney's pulled pork. He and Tyler would then taste their dishes and, for the team they thought had the best dish, double the sales of that dish. The winner was G's Cheesesteaks, whose dish made $182, which doubled to $364.; As Nishaan is halal, they made a deal with Fat Kid Food Co., giving them their pork while receiving 30% of their sales from their special. At elimination, Nishaan was the top seller for the second time, while Burger Walla was eliminated.
114	3	"Son of a Myrtle Beach"	August 17, 2025
The six teams meet Tyler on the sands of Myrtle Beach, where they're given their first challenge of the weekend.: Each team must make their version of one of six staple boardwalk foods: loaded fries, onion rings, street corn, corn dogs, nachos, or skewers. As Nishaan was the top seller last week, they not only chose first but also determined the selection order. Tyler would then taste their dishes and award money in three categories with different rewards: Marketability for $100, Innovation for $200, and Best-Tasting for $300. The winner of all three categories was Fat Kid Food Co., earning them $600 for their till.; While the first day saw the teams together at Pyler Park, the second day had the teams find their own locations. Tyler later called them to hand out their next challenge.: Each team had to make a savory funnel cake for their menu, with the team that earned the most from funnel cake sales being able to shut down a team of their choice for one hour. The winner was Fat Kid Food Co. and they shut down Cooking with Que.; At elimination, Good Fortune Company was announced as the top seller, while G's Cheesesteaks was eliminated.
115	4	"Wilmington Revenge"	August 17, 2025
The five teams meet Tyler in Wilmington, North Carolina on the banks of the Cape Fear River, where he gives them the details of their first challenge.: The teams would compete in side-by-side selling duels between their best-selling menu items. Whoever made the most money from their dish would take the money made from their opponent's dish. As Good Fortune Company won the previous week, not only were they exempt from the challenge, but they would set up the duels: Nishaan vs. Stop Drop N Roll and Fat Kid Food Co. vs. Cooking with Que. The winners were Nishaan, who took $210 from Stop Drop N Roll, and Cooking with Que, who took $275 from Fat Kid Food Co..; Due to Wilmington's strict health codes, the teams could only prep their food in a commissary kitchen. This proves quite troublesome as both Cooking with Que and Fat Kid Food Co. forget crucial items in a rush to open. Day two sees the teams start bright and early, where, as they leave their hotel, they're greeted by Tyler and the guest judge of their next challenge, James Beard-nominated chef Lauren Krall Ivey.: Teams had 30 minutes to create their take on a Southern breakfast, with the winner receiving $15,000 in prize money, courtesy of Best Western. The winner was Cooking with Que.; As the teams prepare to open, health inspectors arrive. While four of the teams passed inspection, Nishaan is temporarily shut down due to running out of water. Forced to return to the commissary, they forget to lock their truck's fridge and spill a pan of food. At elimination, Good Fortune Company won their second week in a row, while Fat Kid Food Co. was eliminated.
116	5	"Darlington Dash"	August 24, 2025
The four teams drive into the pits of Darlington Raceway, where Tyler introduces them to the judges of their first challenge, NASCAR racer Todd Gilliland and personality Mamba Smith.: Teams had to make an elevated tailgate dish for Tyler, Todd, and Mamba. The team that completes their dish first would be able to shut down two teams at any time for an hour, while the team with the best-tasting dish would win $300. The winner of both components of the challenge was Stop Drop N Roll.; The teams then drive into the city of Darlington, where they're told to find their own places to sell. Cooking with Que has some organizational errors when trying to fulfill tickets, when suddenly, Stop Drop N Roll calls in. Due to their unspoken alliance, however, they instead shut down Nishaan and Good Fortune Company. On day two, everyone ends up in the town square, much to Nishaan's annoyance. As they open and begin selling, Tyler calls the frontperson of each team with a special challenge.: Teams have to shell a 3 lbs. bag of boiled peanuts that they would implement in an existing dish; all peanuts must be used. If a team sold out of their peanut dish, they would earn $500. This challenge was optional and could only be taken if a team's frontperson decided to. All but Stop Drop N Roll participated in the challenge, with each team selling out and winning $500.; Tempers rise as Quiana and Ari disagree on what to focus on. While this is going on, Stop Drop N Roll learn what the challenge was and begins second-guessing their decision to opt out. At elimination, Good Fortune Company won their third week in a row, while Stop Drop N Roll had the lowest sales. However, Tyler reveals this was part one of a two-part leg, and all four teams would move on, with their totals carrying over to the next city. On the way, tensions between the members of Cooking with Que reach a stress point as Ari calls her mother.
117	6	"Yes, Virginia, There Is a Beach"	August 31, 2025
Cooking with Que comes back together as the teams meet Tyler on the sands of Virginia Beach, during the height of the East Coast She-Crab Soup Classic. To honor the event, Tyler announces the first challenge in part two of this two-part leg.: Teams must turn their most popular dish into a she-crab soup-inspired special, with blue crab as the main protein. The first team to sell $200 worth of their dish would win $300. Meanwhile, judges from the festival would taste their dishes, and the team whose dish they liked best would win $500. Stop Drop N Roll and Good Fortune Company both won the sales portion, splitting the prize $150 each, but Stop Drop N Roll won the taste portion, earning the full $500.; Day two sees the teams back on the boardwalk in their own spots. Good Fortune Company and Stop Drop N Roll park within walking distance of each other, much to the former's annoyance. However, slow business on the boardwalk leaves every team desperate. Nishaan drops their prices, while Good Fortune Company switches out the frontperson to bring over any guests. Cooking with Que's morale is boosted when Ari's family visits, and Sarah redirects customers to Stop Drop N Roll. Tyler later calls with two special challenges.: Teams must make a dish for Tyler utilizing the three sisters – corn, squash, and green beans. The winning team wins $900, which they may split with two other teams as they wish. The winner was Nishaan, who chose to give $100 each to Cooking with Que and Good Fortune Company, leaving them with $700.; Tyler also announced that, in honor of World Central Kitchen's 15th anniversary, the team with the highest sales that day would be doubled and donated in their name granted to the organization. Stop Drop N Roll would be the winner, making $1,116, meaning $2,232 was donated to WCK in their name. At elimination, Nishaan would win their third city of the race, while Stop Drop N Roll was ultimately eliminated.
118	7	"Showdown in Newport News"	September 7, 2025
The final three arrive in Newport News, Virginia, where they'll be selling together to both the public and workers of Newport News Shipbuilding. Tyler claims their first challenge is a mystery, but they should focus on their ticket times, consistency, and efficiency. Unbeknownst to the teams, they had been competing in a challenge during their service.: As the teams were selling, Tyler set up a sting operation by tapping into the trucks' cameras, taking notes on the efficiency of each team. The team that worked the best would win $300, while the loser would be punished. The winner was Good Fortune Company while the loser was Cooking with Que.; Tyler immediately closes Cooking with Que because of poor organization and not working cleanly. He advises them to scale down to one customizable menu item, sending them off to do some more shopping. As they were shut down, Good Fortune Company sells out of wings, but instead of shopping, they added a vegan option to their menu. With little time left, Cooking with Que returns as Nishaan takes a quick shopping trip after nearly selling out. On a rainy day two, each team would find their own spot, but coincidentally, they set up within walking distance of each other in William Styron Square. As Good Fortune Company and Cooking with Que hit a stride, Nishaan makes adjustments for a customer with a dairy allergy. Tyler eventually calls to give them their second challenge alongside the special judge, Chef Aarti Sequeira.: Each team would receive a bag of Chesapeake oysters that they would shuck and dress with their flavors. Tyler and Aarti would taste each team's oyster, with the winning team earning $300 in their till. The winner was Cooking with Que.; At elimination, Good Fortune Company won their fourth city, while Cooking with Que was ultimately eliminated.
119	8	"Norfolk Fork-Off"	September 14, 2025
Good Fortune Company and Nishaan convene at Naval Station Norfolk, meeting Tyler in front of the USS George H. W. Bush. In collaboration with the United States Navy and the United Service Organizations, Tyler gives them the premise of their most daunting sales day yet: The teams would create a menu that adds up to $20 to feed the sailors stationed on the USS Bush. Each sailor is given 20 USO Bucks, each equating to US$1. As the teams sell, Good Fortune Company is noticeably making more food sales than Nishaan, who are mostly selling drinks. While they continue to feed the sailors, Tyler suddenly steps onto the trucks to relay their first proper challenge.: Each team had to create an elevated garrison ration that is healthy yet high-calorie, and can be mass-produced. Tyler would bring three culinary specialists from the USS Bush to taste their rations, with the winner earning $300 in their till. The winner was Good Fortune Company.; Nishaan's ticket times speed up as Good Fortune Company stumbles on orders, but according to feedback from the soldiers, the latter had the better food. The following day, rain falls as the teams need to find locations in Norfolk. Both end up at the Waterside District, but Nishaan parks under a skybridge to keep their line dry. Once they start selling, though, Tyler calls in with one final challenge.: Both teams had to recreate the dishes they had made in their very first challenge to show how much they've improved. The team whose dish Tyler likes the best would earn $300. The winner was Good Fortune Company.; The finalists later returned to base to meet Tyler, who presented two footlockers, one containing $50,000. Nishaan ultimately wins the season, leaving Good Fortune Company as the runner-up.

=== Season 19: Sweet and Savory (2026) ===
Team name	Flavor	Team members	Hometown	Cuisine	Place
Bug & Bear's Cannoli	Sweet	Joseph Serpico, Matthew Wilson, Dina Pecci	Los Angeles, California	Italian, especially cannoli	6
Cason Funnel Cakes	Sweet	Andre "Dre" Cason, Terrence "TC" Cason, Morris "Moe" Green	Richmond, Virginia	Funnel cakes	3
Deadproof Pizza Co.	Savory	Dante Marino, Thomas Lomanno, Lisa Bosteels	Derry, New Hampshire	Neapolitan pizza	7
Grounds Donut House	Sweet	Gabriella Amoroso; Carmela "Mela" Varotta, Stephanie Hill	The Bronx, New York	Doughnuts	8
Hele Rolls	Sweet	Brittany "Kawai" Lopez, Jasmin Milam, Mari Wills	Makakilo, Hawaii	Hawaiian and Hawaiian-inspired cinnamon rolls	2
Jollof Bowl	Savory	Ethel Kamara, Andrea Kamara, Lekan Oketunji	Baltimore, Maryland	West African	4
Stuph'd Beignets & Burgers	Savory	Duana Lawrence, Sherman Clarke, Dionne Lewis	New Orleans, Louisiana	Stuffed beignets and burgers	1
Waffadilla	Savory	Madison Peterson, Gavin Mari, Shawn Peterson	Hampshire, Illinois	Waffle-style quesadillas	5

No. overall	No. in season	Title	Original release date
120	1	"Music City Mayhem"	July 26, 2026
Eight teams, four each specializing in sweet and savory flavors, meet Tyler Florence in Nashville, where they immediately have their first challenge.: Each team had 45 minutes to create a dish inspired by their favorite music genre. Both the Sweet and Savory trucks must then decide which dish would represent their flavor for Tyler to try. Bug & Bear's Cannoli represented Sweet, while Waffadilla represented Savory. The winner was Bug & Bear's Cannoli, earning the Sweet teams an extra 30 minutes of selling time the next day.; After being rained out on the first day, the teams have their first joint selling day on Broadway. Stuph'd has a brief technical issue when their fryer's pilot light flares up. Within moments of prepping, Tyler calls with another challenge.: The hype person for each team is sent to find one of four staple Nashville ingredients from local bars and restaurants to make a special. Tyler would taste each team's special, with the winning team receiving $300 to their till. The winner was Stuph'd Beignets & Burgers.; At elimination in nearby Murfreesboro, held at Hops Springs Beerpark, Cason Funnel Cakes was announced as the top seller. As a special twist this season, the top seller each week won a "Pole Position Prize" that would be crucial in the following week. In this case, they won immunity from being in the bottom two for the next city. Meanwhile, the bottom two teams were Deadproof Pizza Co. and Grounds Donut House. However, in another new twist, the bottom two each week compete in a "redemption" cook-off to determine who was eliminated.: Judged by Tyler and famed Nashville chef Maneet Chauhan, both teams had to make a dish featuring garam masala in 45 minutes. The winner was Deadproof Pizza Co., meaning Grounds Donut House was eliminated.
121	2	"The Tennessee Whiskey Trail"	August 2, 2026
The teams head to Franklin, Tennessee on the Tennessee Whiskey Trail, where they have free rein on where to park. Multiple trucks end up heading to The Factory, while Waffadilla sets up at a local coffee shop. Several trucks also decided to expand their menu to both sweet and savory items to increase sales. Matt puts on a headset to bring people to Bug & Bear's Cannoli, irritating the other trucks around them. In the midst of the sales day, Tyler, calling from a distillery, gives them their challenge for the week.: Teams must make and sell a "food truck flight" consisting of three mini tastes of their truck concept. Tyler would taste their flights, with the winner of the challenge receiving $300 to their till. The winner was Stuph'd Beignets & Burgers.; Some teams are upset they didn't win the challenge, while others decide to relocate due to slowing foot traffic. Deadproof Pizza Co. and Bug & Bear's Cannoli partner up to boost each other's sales. The second day sees the teams selling at Leiper's Fork Distillery, and while Tyler doesn't give the teams a challenge, several face challenges of their own. Deadproof Pizza Co. runs late due to mechanical issues on their truck. Bug & Bear's Cannoli's illegible, unorganized tickets leave them frustrated, while Cason Funnel Cakes does what they can, including taking Matt's headset and playing Jenga, to gain customers. Throughout the selling day, Deadproof Pizza Co. was shocked at their competitor's prices. At elimination in Leiper's Fork, Waffadilla was announced as the top seller for this leg of the race. Meanwhile, the bottom two teams were Deadproof Pizza Co. and Bug & Bear's Cannoli, forcing them to compete in the redemption challenge. Cason Funnel Cakes was the lowest-selling team, but due to their "Pole Position Prize" from the previous week, they were immune from redemption.: Competing for judge Aarti Sequiera, the two teams had 45 minutes to make a dish with Tennessee whiskey. The winner was Bug & Bear's Cannoli, meaning Deadproof Pizza Co. was eliminated.
122	3	"Knoxville Crowd Crawl, Part 1"	August 9, 2026
Arriving in Knoxville, Tennessee at the University of Tennessee's Knoxville campus, Tyler informs the teams they would compete in a three-legged race – three different locations with three different demographics. He reveals that the lowest-selling team for each leg would compete for redemption before announcing Waffadilla's "Pole Position Prize" from the previous week – immunity from the bottom during one of the legs. They decide not to use it at the university; however, a brief generator stoppage leaves them wondering if they should've claimed it. Cason Funnel Cakes was annoyed with their spot being hidden behind trees, while the others were open in a large field. As the teams start selling, Tyler calls with their first challenge.: The teams were challenged to mash up two dishes as the day's special that could grab the students' attention. Tyler judged their specials, and whoever had the best combination of taste and creativity won $300 for their till. The winner was Hele Rolls.; Throughout the day, multiple trucks have problems with each other. Stuph'd Beignets & Burgers is angered when Bug & Bear's Cannoli sends business to Jollof Bowl. At the same time, Cason Funnel Cakes steals Bug & Bear's teddy bear mascot, which they learn about from Waffadilla, whose problems continue as Shawn disappears briefly trying to grab customers. The second leg of the week sees the teams selling at the Rossini Festival, a street fair dedicated to international culture and arts. While they were permitted to sell there, they were parked just outside the main square. Waffadilla chose not to use their immunity for this leg but began to regret it once they saw they were at the back of the line. Tyler then stops by to announce the next challenge.: Each truck has to switch from sweet to savory and vice versa to make a dish for Tyler. The winning team would win $300 to their till. The winner was Bug & Bear's Cannoli.
123	4	"Knoxville Crowd Crawl, Part 2"	August 9, 2026
Part 2 begins in the middle of the sales day. Waffadilla brings samples to the event's beer tent, earning them some new customers. As the day winds down, Cason Funnel Cakes returns the bear they stole from Bug & Bear's Cannoli. The third leg of Knoxville sends the teams to Ancient Lore Village resort for a magic festival. Bug & Bear's Cannoli adopts elf ears while Shawn and Lekan engage in a sword fight. As the teams start selling, Tyler texts them with another challenge.: One member from each team is sent on a "quest," where they have to race around a pond in inflatable horses to a table of six ingredients – honeycomb, lavender, popping candy, pork belly, coconut, and dragon's beard candy. They would then use the ingredient they selected in a dish for Tyler to try, with the winning team earning $300 in their till. The winner was Stuph'd Beignets & Burgers.; At elimination in World's Fair Park, Hele Rolls, who won two legs of Knoxville, was announced as the winner this week; their "Pole Position Prize" was immunity from the bottom next week. Meanwhile, Bug & Bear's Cannoli, Cason Funnel Cakes, and Waffadilla were the lowest-selling teams of each leg; however, because of Waffadilla's immunity, the redemption battle would be between Bug & Bear and Cason.: With Cousins Maine Lobster co-founder Sabin Lomac judging, the teams had to make a layered dish, inspired by Petro's Chili & Chips' signature Frito pie, in 45 minutes, featuring at least four layers. The winner was Cason Funnel Cakes, meaning Bug & Bear's Cannoli was eliminated.
124	5	"The Great Gatlinburg Smoke Off"	August 16, 2026
Driving to Gatlinburg, Tennessee, at the foot of Great Smoky Mountains National Park, Tyler details the weekend's first challenge inspired by the mountains.: Each team must send one member up Crockett Mountain to a lookout point and retrieve one of five smoky ingredients – smoked sausage, smoked salt, smoked gouda, smoked salsa, or hickory-smoked potato chips. After they prep their regular menus, they would have 45 minutes to make a dish for Tyler utilizing their chosen ingredient. The winning team would get $300 in their till. The winner was Jollof Bowl.; Hele Rolls has a brief scare with a pilot-light flare-up; meanwhile, Cason Funnel Cakes themes their menu around contemporary American food to commemorate the veteran community. As the day winds down and crowds thin out, most of the trucks send one member to gather customers outside the parking lot to varying degrees of success. Towards the end, Lekan jumps a group that both Waffadilla and Cason Funnel Cakes also eyed, much to the latter two's chagrin. At elimination in Mynatt Park, Tyler feels the teams have become complacent with immunity being the "Pole Position Prize." Case in point, Hele Rolls ended up with the lowest sales but were spared from the redemption challenge due to winning the previous week and earning immunity. Jollof Bowl was announced as the top seller this week, with their "Pole Position Prize" being an extra hour to sell next week. Meanwhile, Waffadilla and Cason Funnel Cakes competed for redemption.: Cooking for barbecue pitmaster and BBQ Brawl winner/judge Rashad Jones, the bottom two have 45 minutes to create a campfire-inspired dish, with at least one element being cooked over open fire. The winner was Cason Funnel Cakes, meaning Waffadilla was eliminated.
125	6	"Dishing It Out at Dollywood"	August 23, 2026
In Pigeon Forge, Tennessee, the final four set up shop in Dollywood near the Tennessee Tornado roller coaster. Cason Funnel Cakes gets more competitive with pricing and sales as Jollof Bowl continues its aggressive sales push. Hele Rolls gets hung up by both a customer with an egg allergy and Kawai charging the wrong price for an item. Tyler then calls in for the first challenge of the day.: One member of each team played a round at the Tornado Alley game for first pick of one of four iconic Dollywood food items – fudge, smoked turkey leg, cinnamon bread, or candied jalapeños – to incorporate in a dish for Tyler. The winning team would earn $300 towards their till. The winner was Stuph'd Beignets & Burgers.; Cason Funnel Cakes gather a crowd thanks to a group of kids, while Hele Rolls runs low on food. With Jollof Bowl having an extra hour to sell in the park, the other three teams are invited to ride the coaster with Tyler. The next day, elimination takes place at Dollywood's Splash Country. Stuph'd Beignets & Burgers was the top seller, with their "Pole Position Prize" being an extra hour to sell next week. Meanwhile, Jollof Bowl and Hele Rolls competed for redemption.: With veteran competition chef Arnold Myint as the judge, the bottom two had 45 minutes to create a dish featuring Dolly Parton's favorite ingredient, potatoes. The winner was Hele Rolls, meaning Jollof Bowl was eliminated.
126	7	"The Great Kentucky Cook-Off"	August 30, 2026
The final three had three days to sell in Louisville, but only two could move on beyond the first day. The weekend begins with each team trying to find locations. While Hele Rolls and Stuph'd Beignets & Burgers are immediately successful, Cason Funnel Cakes has some trouble after calling various businesses to minimal results. When they suddenly pull up across the road from Stuph'd Beignets & Burgers, the latter react unhappily. During the day, business slows for Cason Funnel Cakes, causing them to wonder about moving locations, but they decide to think about it later after Tyler gives the teams their taste challenge for the week.: Each team must use blackberries, the state fruit of Kentucky, in a dish, with the winning team earning $300. The winner was Hele Rolls.; With only two hours of sales left and business picking back up, Cason Funnel Cakes decided to stay in their current spot. Hele Rolls began running out of ingredients, forcing them to go shopping and change up their menu to finish out the last hour. At elimination at Louisville Waterfront Park, Tyler announced that Hele Rolls was the top seller, with their "Pole Position Prize" to be announced the following week. As such, Cason Funnel Cakes and Stuph'd Beignets & Burgers had to compete for redemption.: The bottom two teams must cook for chef Kelsey Murphy a dish centered around beer cheese in 45 minutes. The winner was Stuph'd Beignets & Burgers, meaning Cason Funnel Cakes was eliminated.
127	8	"The Legends of Louisville"	September 6, 2026
The final two teams meet with Tyler outside their location for the second day of the weekend, the Louisville Slugger Museum & Factory. Hele Rolls is told their "Pole Position Prize" is an extra hour of sales, and they opened first, annoying Stuph'd Beignets & Burgers. They decide to open mid-prep, but their orders slow down when they forget to turn on their deep fryer. Hele Rolls isn't much better when they get slammed, but they get a surprise when Jasmin's family stops by. Tyler then calls in from the Muhammad Ali Center to give the teams their final challenge of the race.: Both teams had to make a dish using one of four ingredients that "pack a punch": wasabi, horseradish, kimchi, or habanero. Tyler would taste their dishes, and the winning team received $300 for their till. The winner was Stuph'd Beignets & Burgers.; Not long after being told sales were neck and neck, Hele Rolls – believing they had enough food for the day – realizes that was no longer the case. Now forced to go shopping mid-sale day, Stuph'd Beignets & Burgers continues to sell and capitalize on the crowd. When Hele Rolls returns, they find that they forgot to buy French fries, necessitating a change to their menu. Once Stuph'd Beignets & Burgers closed for the day, Kawai runs around town to pull in customers. The final sales day sees the teams selling at Churchill Downs during Twilight Thursday, where they had to sell only one dish. Before the day began, Hele Rolls learns that they had the most sales yesterday. The teams then learn they were competing for taste, not sales, and that the guests would each vote for their favorite dish from either truck. Additionally, Tyler and celebrity chef Damaris Phillips would each have five votes and could divide them between the final two. Because Hele Rolls won the day before, their "Pole Position Prize" granted them five extra votes. Ultimately, Stuph'd Beignets & Burgers received the most votes, including all of Tyler and Damaris' votes, winning the season, leaving Hele Rolls as the runner-up.
