= Jason Quinn (chef) =

American chef

Jason Quinn is a chef who won The Great Food Truck Race in 2011 and who is frequently a reference point in the development of culinary culture in Orange County, California.

As recently as the 1990s, award-winning restaurants in Orange County consisted mostly of national chain restaurants with traditional American or Tex-Mex comfort food, in the late 1990s, culinary restaurant groups were formed featuring nouvelle cuisine, gourmet burgers and more; later in 2007 the Marneaus founded Marché Moderne and Top Chef chef Amar Santana opened a branch of Charlie Palmer (closed 2015).

Against the backdrop of this initial culinary scene in Orange County, Quinn opened Playground in Downtown Santa Ana (now "Playground DTSA") and later, Playground 2.0.

In 2016, Quinn also opened three stands ("Noodle Tramp", "PFC", and "Wagyu Chuck") in the Downtown Santa Ana 4th Street Market food hall when it opened, but later closed them, but kept operating his bar there called "Recess Libations".
