= Grill 'Em All =

Restaurant in California, U.S.

Restaurant information
- Location: California, United States
- Website: grillemallburgs.com

Grill 'Em All is a burger restaurant operating from a food truck in the U.S. state of California. The business won the first season of the television series The Great Food Truck Race and has also competed on the Travel Channel series Food Wars.

== Description ==
The California-based food truck Grill 'Em All offers various burgers. The Cowboy from Hell has pulled barbecue chicken, jalapeño bacon, garlic aioli, cheddar cheese, red onions, lettuce, and barbecue sauce. The Behemoth is two grilled cheese sandwiches with bacon, cheddar, grilled onions, pickles, and barbecue sauce. The Dee Snider has peanut butter, strawberry jam, bacon, and sriracha. The menu also includes chicken tenders, hot dogs, and salads.

== History ==
The business is operated by chef Ryan Harkins and Matthew Chernus, who started the food truck in 2009.

Grill 'Em All won the first season of the American television series The Great Food Truck Race, earning a $50,000 prize. After winning, the business became a brick and mortar restaurant. Grill 'Em All has also competed on the Travel Channel series Food Wars.

== See also ==
- List of food trucks
- List of hamburger restaurants
- List of The Great Food Truck Race episodes
