= Fat Kid Food Co. =

Food truck based in Oregon, United States

Restaurant information
- Location: Oregon, United States

Fat Kid Food Co. is a food truck based in the U.S. state of Oregon.

== Description ==
The food truck is based in Southern Oregon. It is primarily in Ashland but has traveled across the West Coast.

Fat Kid Food Co. serves Pacific Rim-style street food. The menu changes often; options have included the Krabby Patty, which has a soft-shell crab over a burger patty with eel sauce and kewpie, and the PBWTF, which has peanut butter, chipotle raspberry jam, and tempura-fried jalapeños.

== History ==
Chaz McKenna is the owner. In 2020, the business provided thousands of meals for wildfire evacuees in Oregon.

The business has been a vendor at the Oregon Leaf Bowl, which is a cannabis event. It has also served food at Halloweird, a cannabis event organized by Leaf Magazine.

The business competed on the eighteenth season of the Food Network series The Great Food Truck Race.

== See also ==
- List of The Great Food Truck Race episodes
