= Daniel Shemtob =

American chef and entrepreneur

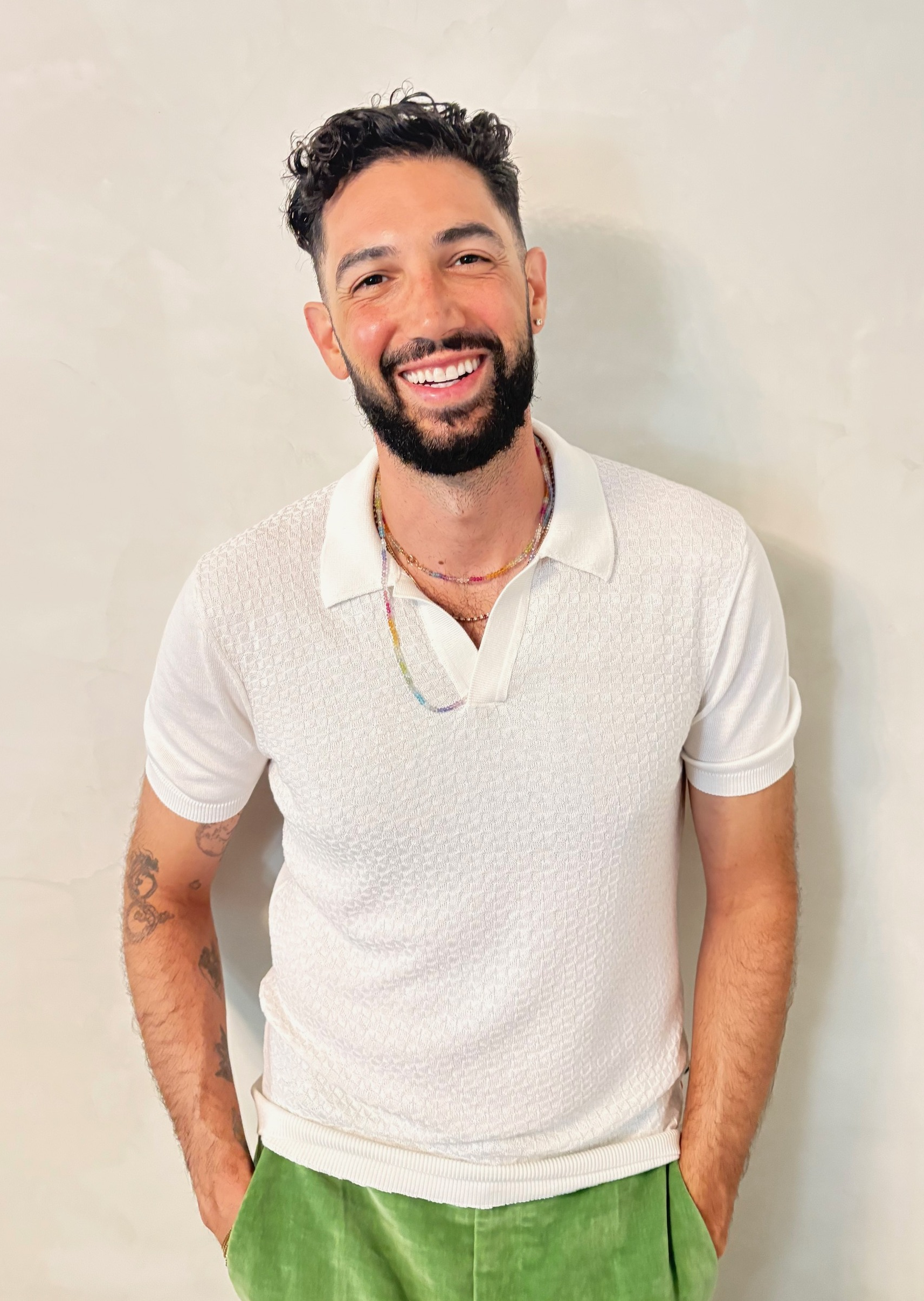
- Shemtob in 2026
- Born: 1988 (age 37–38)
- Culinary career
- Current restaurant: The Lime Truck
- Television show: The Great Food Truck Race

Daniel Shemtob is an American chef and entrepreneur based in Los Angeles. He is the founder of The Lime Truck, a food truck business that won Food Network's The Great Food Truck Race in 2011 and the show's All-Stars edition in 2021. Shemtob has also launched restaurants in Southern California and co-founded the footwear brand Snibbs, which makes workwear shoes for service-industry staff.

== Early life and education ==
Shemtob was born in 1988 and grew up in Newport Beach and Irvine, California, in the Turtle Rock Village neighborhood of Irvine. He has described his upbringing as an Iranian Jewish home where food was central, and has said one of his earliest cooking memories was making matzo pizza for his family at age six or seven.

He graduated from University High School in Irvine in 2006. Shemtob worked in restaurants from his teenage years, including bussing tables at Gina's Pizza, and did not attend culinary school. He co-founded The Lime Truck in 2010, the week before his twenty-first birthday.

== Career ==
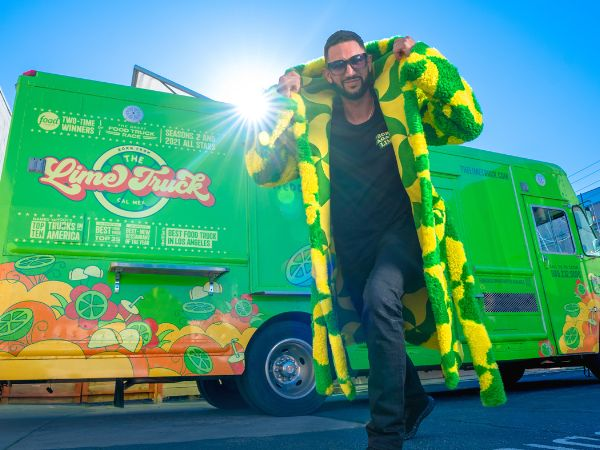
The Lime Truck with Owner and Chef Daniel Shemtob posing outside of the truck in 2025

Shemtob founded The Lime Truck in 2010, serving a California-style Mexican menu in the greater Los Angeles and Orange County areas. In 2011, the truck won the second season of Food Network's The Great Food Truck Race, and in 2021 it won the program's All-Stars season.

Shemtob opened a brick-and-mortar restaurant, TLT Food, in Westwood and later in Newport Beach. He sold his share of TLT Food in 2021. His other restaurant ventures have included Hatch Yakitori + Bar in downtown Los Angeles, which was named Best Yakitori Bar in LA Weekly's 2019 "Best of Los Angeles" food and drink awards.

== Snibbs ==
Shemtob co-founded Snibbs, a footwear company that makes slip-resistant shoes intended for hospitality, healthcare, and other service-industry workers. The idea originated after Shemtob suffered a back injury from a fall in a restaurant kitchen, and he partnered with orthopedic surgeon Jason Snibbe and Haik Zadoyan to develop the product. The brand publicly launched its first shoe, the SpaceCloud, in April 2022. In April 2025, Snibbs released its first boot, the Pro, and in October 2025 it released "The Nancy," a clog co-designed with chef Nancy Silverton. Following the January 2025 Los Angeles wildfires, Snibbs partnered with apron-maker Hedley & Bennett on a relief collaboration, and, according to Entrepreneur, by late 2025 had donated more than 1,000 pairs of shoes to hospitality workers through a community giveback program.

== Personal life ==
Shemtob is married. During the January 2025 Palisades Fire in Los Angeles, he and his wife lost their home. While displaced, he worked with José Andrés's non-profit World Central Kitchen to use The Lime Truck to provide meals for evacuees and first responders affected by the fires.
