= Misa Chien =

American entrepreneur

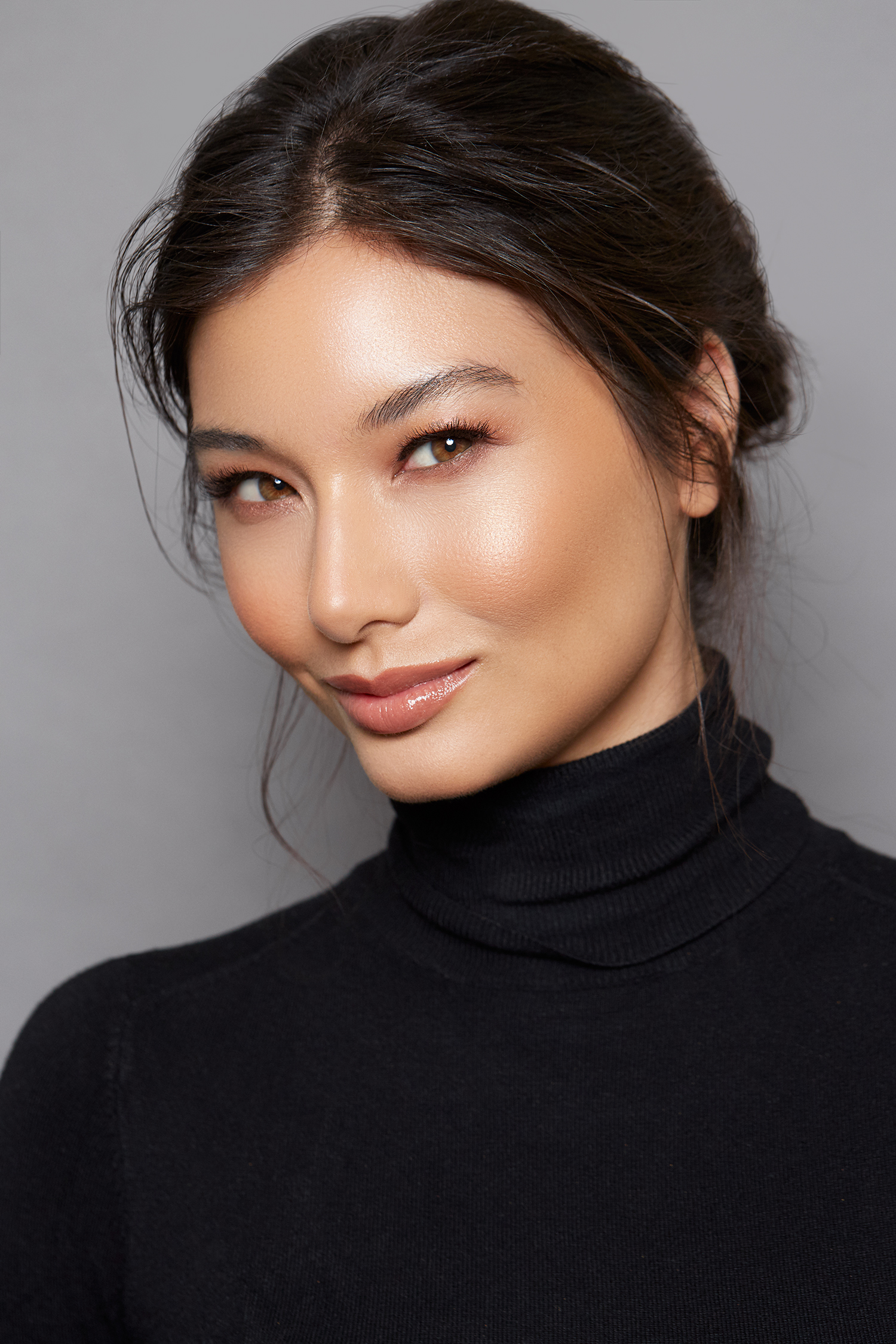
- Education: University of California, Los Angeles (2008)
- Occupations: Entrepreneur; Speaker
- Website: www.misachien.com

Misa Chien is an American entrepreneur and speaker based in Los Angeles. California

== Biography and career ==
=== Early life, modeling, and Nom Nom Truck ===
Misa Chien graduated from the University of California, Los Angeles (UCLA) in 2008, where she studied French and Global Studies. After graduating, she pursued commercial modeling, appearing in campaigns for brands including Target, Mazda, L'Oréal, and Mary Kay.

In 2009, Misa co-founded Nom Nom Truck with fellow UCLA alumna Jennifer Green. The Los Angeles-based food truck specialized in bánh mì and other Vietnamese-inspired dishes and later expanded to San Francisco.

In 2010, Nom Nom Truck competed on the inaugural season of Food Network's The Great Food Truck Race. The team finished as runner-up in the competition.

Misa received national recognition for her work with Nom Nom Truck. She was featured by CNNMoney as part of its coverage of young female entrepreneurs, and in 2011, Misa and Green were named to Inc. magazine's annual “30 Under 30” list of young entrepreneurs.

=== Technology entrepreneurship ===
Following Nom Nom Truck, Misa moved into technology entrepreneurship. She co-founded Fosubo, a customer and employee feedback technology company whose name stood for “forget the suggestion box.”

In 2013, Fosubo won AngelHack's Global Demo Day competition, competing against startups selected through AngelHack events held in cities around the world.

Misa later co-founded Autopilot Reviews, a customer experience platform focused on collecting customer feedback and helping businesses evaluate customer service and employee performance.

Her work in technology and customer experience also led to speaking engagements and appearances focused on entrepreneurship, customer experience, leadership, and business growth.

=== Speaking and executive education ===
Misa has spoken publicly about entrepreneurship, leadership, customer experience, imposter syndrome, and the experiences of Asian American women in business.

In 2020, she delivered a TEDxSanLuisObispo talk titled “How to Embrace Imposter Syndrome,” drawing on her experiences with entrepreneurship and the eventual closure of Nom Nom Truck.

Misa has also participated in several Harvard Business School Executive Education programs. She completed The Business of Media, Entertainment and Sports in 2022, Women of Color in Leadership in 2023, and Authentic Leadership Development in 2024.

She has described her participation in the Women of Color in Leadership program, led by Professor Linda Hill, as particularly influential in her understanding of identity, bias, leadership, and professional networks. Misa has connected the experience to her later work building a professional community for Asian women leaders.

She has subsequently remained involved with Harvard Business School programs and events, including participating in discussions related to leadership and the experiences of women of color in business.

=== The Authentic Asian ===
In 2023, Misa founded The Authentic Asian, a professional community for Asian women leaders.

The organization brings together executives, entrepreneurs, and other professionals through membership programs, curated gatherings, professional introductions, leadership events, Supper Clubs, Salons, retreats, and other community-based programs.

Misa has said that her experiences as an Asian American woman in entrepreneurship and business, together with her participation in leadership programs at Harvard Business School, influenced her decision to create the organization.

The Authentic Asian was developed around the idea of creating professional spaces where Asian women could build relationships with peers, discuss shared workplace and leadership experiences, and expand their professional networks.

The organization has since developed programming and gatherings in multiple cities in the United States, as well as events and community activities in Canada and the United Kingdom.

In 2025, Inc. named Misa to its Female Founders 500 list for her work building The Authentic Asian.

=== Writing ===
Misa is working on a book focused on Asian women, identity, cultural expectations, and leadership.

In a 2026 interview, she stated that the book was under contract with Penguin Random House and was expected to be published in 2028. She has referred to the project as Cute Asian versus Tiger Asian.

Themes explored in the book are also reflected in Misa's public speaking and writing, including Asian American identity, gender, cultural expectations, leadership, and the professional experiences of Asian women.

== See also ==
- Female entrepreneurs
