= The Easy Vegan =

Restaurant based in Denver, Colorado, U.S.

Restaurant information
- Location: Denver, Colorado, United States
- Website: theeasyvegandenver.com

The Easy Vegan is a plant-based pop-up restaurant based in Denver, Colorado, United States. The queer-owned business won the sixteenth season of The Great Food Truck Race. The business has operated at farmers' markets.

Taylor Herbert and Alexi Mandolini are co-founders of The Easy Vegan. The two launched the business during the COVID-19 pandemic. The Easy Vegan earned $50,000 for winning The Great Food Truck Race.

== See also ==
- List of restaurants in Denver
- List of vegetarian and vegan restaurants
