= Seoul Sausage =

Restaurant in Los Angeles, California, U.S.

- Interactive map of Seoul Sausage

Restaurant information
- Food type: Korean
- Location: 1263 West 2nd Street, Los Angeles, California, United States
- Coordinates: 34°03′37″N 118°15′28″W
- Website: seoulsausage.com

Seoul Sausage is a catering company and food truck based in Los Angeles, California, United States. Team members Ted Kim, Chris Oh, Yong Kim represented the business and won the third season of the Food Network series The Great Food Truck Race. The business subsequently opened a brick and mortar location in Sawtelle, Los Angeles.

== Description ==
The menu includes Korean barbecue, galbi sausage with kimchi relish, and pork sausages with apple cabbage coleslaw.

== History ==
The business launched in 2012.

== Reception ==
Jeff Miller included Seoul Sausage in Thrillist's 2014 overview of Los Angeles' thirteen best sausage eateries.

== See also ==
- List of food trucks
- List of Korean restaurants
