= Korilla BBQ =

Coordinates: 40.75516°N 73.97482°W

- Interactive map of Korilla BBQ

Restaurant information
- Established: 2010
- Food type: Korean
- Location: New York City, New York, United States

Korilla BBQ is a New York City-based lunch/dinner truck owned by Eddie Song that specializes in Korean-theme burritos, also known as ssams. They also serve Korean-style tacos. They have been positively reviewed by Antenna Magazine, were listed in The Village Voice's Top 10 Vegetarian Street Foods listing, and mentioned first in Zagat's overview of the Korean Taco trend.

Korilla was featured on Season 2 of The Great Food Truck Race on Food Network. They were disqualified after the network accused them of cheating. Korilla strongly denied the accusations but was unable to speak on it further due to their contracts. In an interview for KoreanAmericanStory.org in 2016, Korilla's Eddie Song explained their side of the story. “They’d basically created this roadblock where we can’t sell any barbecue, any meat, so you gotta be completely vegetarian,” he said, “We decided to form a little partnership with one of the top Southern barbecue, a Memphis-style barbecue. They didn’t appreciate that.” He further added, “Our strategy was: We can’t sell any meat? We’ll sell you two tortillas for $8. You can get the protein from our partner, who’s doing this Memphis-style barbecue.”

== See also ==
- List of food trucks
