= The Lime Truck =

American food truck company

Restaurant information
- Food type: California-Mexican (fusion)
- Website: thelimetruck.com

The Lime Truck is a Southern California-based gourmet food truck company founded in 2010 by chef Daniel Shemtob in Orange County. It gained national prominence after winning the second season of the Food Network’s reality competition The Great Food Truck Race in 2011, and later became a two-time champion by winning an "all-star" edition of the series in 2021.

== History ==
Shemtob launched The Lime Truck in June 2010, serving California-Mexican fusion food with an emphasis on local ingredients. After winning the 2011 season of The Great Food Truck Race, Shemtob and his team expanded to multiple trucks across Southern California. By 2012, they opened their first restaurant, TLT Food, in Los Angeles, followed by locations in Irvine and Newport Beach. In 2017, The Lime Truck opened an international outlet in Singapore at the Suntec City food hall. The Lime Truck has participated in charitable efforts including feeding wildfire evacuees and donating meals to frontline workers. In 2025, following the Palisades wildfire, chef Shemtob partnered with World Central Kitchen to serve meals to displaced residents and first responders.

== Recognition ==
The Lime Truck was named a “Top 5 Food Truck in America” by Yahoo Travel from 2013 to 2016 and “Best Food Truck in Orange County” by OC Weekly. The business and its founder were also profiled in industry publications like Fast Casual.

== See also ==
- List of Mexican restaurants
- List of restaurants in Singapore
