= The Great Food Truck Race =

American food reality television series

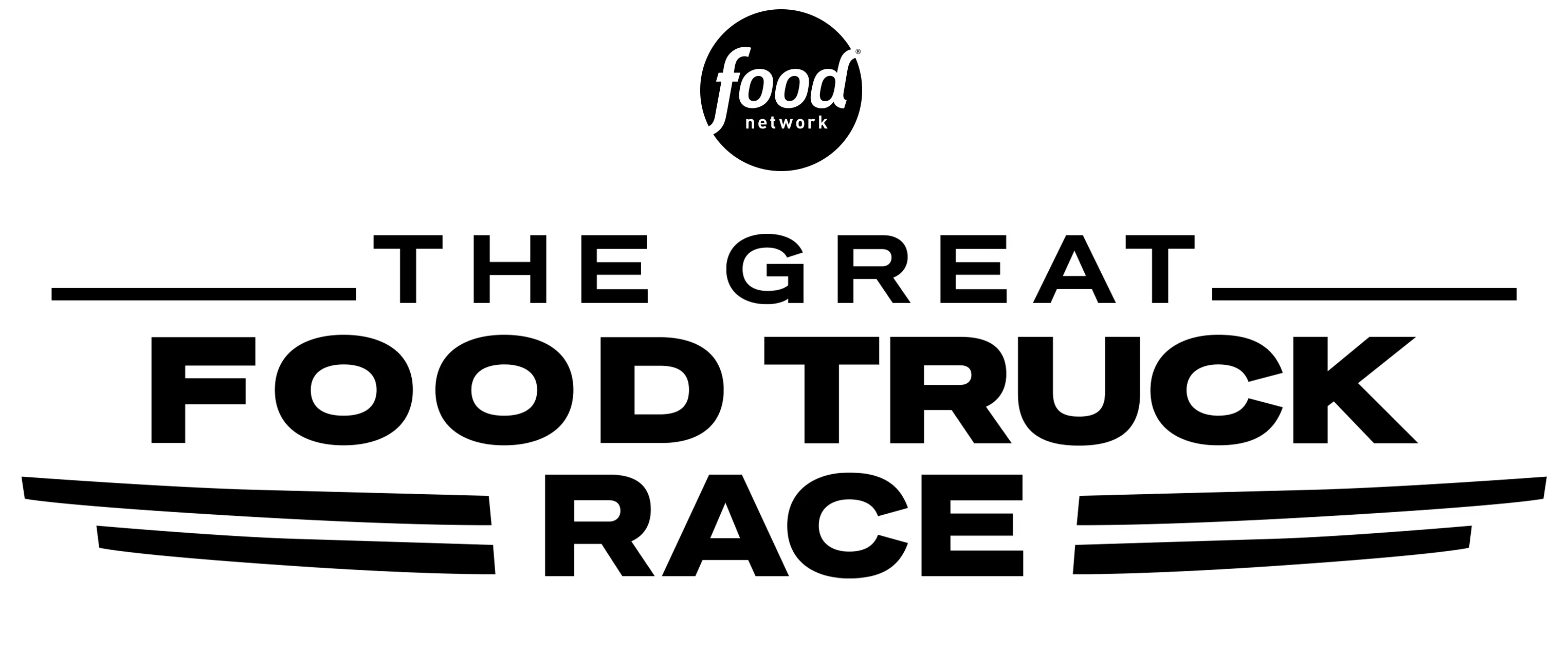
- Genre: Cooking; Reality
- Presented by: Tyler Florence
- Country of origin: United States
- Original language: English
- No. of seasons: 19
- No. of episodes: 127 (list of episodes)

Production
- Production company: Critical Content

Original release
- Network: Food Network
- Release: August 15, 2010 – present

The Great Food Truck Race is an American reality television and cooking series that debuted on August 15, 2010, on Food Network, with Tyler Florence as the host. Billed as a cross between Cannonball Run and Top Chef, this late summer show features several competing teams of three who drive across the United States in their food trucks and make stops every week to sell food in different cities.

The show's nineteenth season premiered on July 26, 2026.

== Format ==
Every season, between six and nine food truck teams compete in a race where they must cook, sell, and adapt to different challenges in the hopes of winning $50,000 (and in some cases, their own food truck). While taking a journey through a specific region or route, every week the food truck that makes the least profit is eliminated and sent home, while the rest of the food trucks continue on to the next city. They're usually given "seed money" at the beginning of each episode that goes towards grocery shopping. The teams are assigned different challenges every week for a chance to earn more money (usually in the form of selling the most of a special dish or making a version of a local delicacy for Tyler and a guest judge). They're also thrown obstacles that hinder their ability to make normal sales (for example, switching their menu to vegan food or being unable to restock supplies for the day).

In the first two seasons, the competitors were seasoned, professional food truck operators who were competing for a cash prize (first season was $50,000 and second season was $100,000). In the following seasons (save for season six), food trucks were provided to novices (from home cooks to former restaurateurs) who have dreamed of owning and operating their own food truck. In seasons three, four, and five, the winning team got the money and got to keep the food truck they were provided by the show. In season six and onward, the show reverted to awarding the winning teams only the $50,000.

== Competition results ==
Season	Winner	Runner-up	3rd Place	4th Place	5th Place	6th Place	7th Place	8th Place	9th Place
1	Grill 'Em All	Nom Nom Truck	Spencer on the Go	Austin Daily Press	Crepes Bonaparte	Ragin' Cajun	Nana Queens		
2	The Lime Truck	Hodge Podge	Roxy's Grilled Cheese	Korilla BBQ	Seabirds	Café Con Leche	Devilicious	Sky's Gourmet Tacos	
3	Seoul Sausage	Nonna's Kitchenette	Pop-a-Waffle	Momma's Grizzly Grub	Coast of Atlanta	Pizza Mike's	Barbie Babes	Under the Crust	
4	Aloha Plate	Tikka Tikka Taco	Philly's Finest Sambonis	The Slide Show	Bowled and Beautiful	Frankfootas	Boardwalk Breakfast Empire	Murphy's Spud Truck	
5	The Middle Feast	Lone Star Chuck Wagon	Let There Be Bacon	Beach Cruiser	Madres Mexican Meals	Military Moms	The Gourmet Graduates	Chatty Chicken	
6	Pho Nomenal Dumplings	Waffle Love	Globally Delicious Stuffed Burgers "GD Bro"	Postcards	Spice It Up	Diso's Italian Sandwich Society	The Guava Tree		
7	Grilled Cheese All-Stars	Carretto Siciliano	Lei-Away Leidies	Sweet Southern Soul	BigMista's Fatty Wagon	Fortune Cooking			
8	Braised in The South	Mr. Po'Boys	The Breakfast Club	The Southern Frenchie	Stick 'Em Up	Papi Chulo's Empanadas	Wicked Good Seafood		
9	Just Wing It	New England Grill	Mobile Moo Shu	Chops' Shop	Buns N' Thighs	Heroes on a Half Shell	Sassy Soul		
10	NOLA Creations	Brunch Babes	Rolling Indulgence	Frank-n-Slides	Madea Made	Baby Got Mac	Sol Food Collective	The People's Fry	Make It Maple
11	Big Stuff	Lia's LUMPIA	Creole Queens	Magical Mystery Heroes	Slapshot				
12	Mystikka Masala	Lunch Ladies	Super Sope	Bachelor Kitchen	Team Fat Kid	Crystal's Comfort Food	Eat My Crust		
13	The Lime Truck	Seoul Sausage	Waffle Love	Aloha Plate	The Middle Feast	NOLA Creations	Mystikka Masala		
14	Tasty Balls	Breakfast for Dinner	Some Like It Tot	Meatball Mamas	Querencia Mia	Metro Chili	The Oink Mobile		
15	Señoreata	Maybe Cheese Born With It	Eso Artisinal Pasta	Amawele's	Southern Pride Asian Fusion	Food Flight	Salsa Queen	Sauté Kingz	Girl's Got Balls
16	The Easy Vegan	Khana	D'Pura Cepa	Da Bald Guy	Lisa's Crêperie	2 Girls Jamaican Tacos	Paisani	4 Hens Creole Kitchen	The Block
17	Wally's Waffles	Bao Bei	Argentina's Empanadas	Fishnet	SOLA Po'Boys	Plates on Deck	Down to Get Tacos	Cooks with Passion	Kalye
18	Nishaan	Good Fortune Company	Cooking with Que	Stop Drop N Roll	Fat Kid Food Co.	G's Cheesesteaks	Burger Walla	Rising Tiger	Eat My Biscuits
19	Stuph'd Beignets & Burgers	Hele Rolls	Cason Funnel Cakes	Jollof Bowl	Waffadilla	Bug & Bear's Cannoli	Deadproof Pizza Co.	Grounds Donut House	

== Episodes ==
Season	Subtitle	Episodes	Originally released	
Season	Subtitle	Episodes	First released	Last released
1	—N/a	6	August 15, 2010	September 19, 2010
2	—N/a	7	August 14, 2011	September 25, 2011
3	—N/a	7	August 19, 2012	September 30, 2012
4	—N/a	7	August 18, 2013	September 29, 2013
5	—N/a	7	August 17, 2014	September 28, 2014
6	Route 66	6	August 23, 2015	September 27, 2015
7	Family Face-Off	5	August 28, 2016	September 25, 2016
8	Battle for The South	6	August 20, 2017	September 24, 2017
9	Wild West	6	July 26, 2018	August 30, 2018
10	Summer Beach Battle	8	June 9, 2019	July 28, 2019
11	Holiday Hustle	4	November 27, 2019	December 18, 2019
12	Gold Coast	6	March 19, 2020	April 23, 2020
13	All-Stars – Battle of The Bay	6	June 7, 2021	July 18, 2021
14	Alaska – Battle for The North	6	March 7, 2021	April 11, 2021
15	Hottest Season Ever	8	June 5, 2022	July 24, 2022
16	David vs. Goliath	8	June 18, 2023	July 30, 2023
17	Games on The Gulf	8	June 30, 2024	August 18, 2024
18	Truckin' Awesome	8	August 3, 2025	September 14, 2025
19	Sweet and Savory	8	July 26, 2026	September 6, 2026

== Production ==
Bob Tuschman, general manager of the Food Network, had gotten several pitches for a food truck themed competition show before settling on the show that would become The Great Food Truck Race. He believed it to be ideal because it combined the Survivor-style reality show competition with the rising trend of food trucks. Tyler Florence was immediately on board and as the show grew and got renewed, so did the food truck scene. Florence believed the food truck trend grew in large part because of the economic slump around the early 2000s, and his show "helped invent an entirely new genre of restaurants".

Seasons 4 and 13 participated in the San Francisco "Scene in San Francisco Incentive Program" administered by the San Francisco Film Commission.

== Reception ==
Melissa Camacho of Common Sense Media gave the show a 3 out of 5 stars.
