= Seoul Taco =

American Korean-Mexican fusion chain

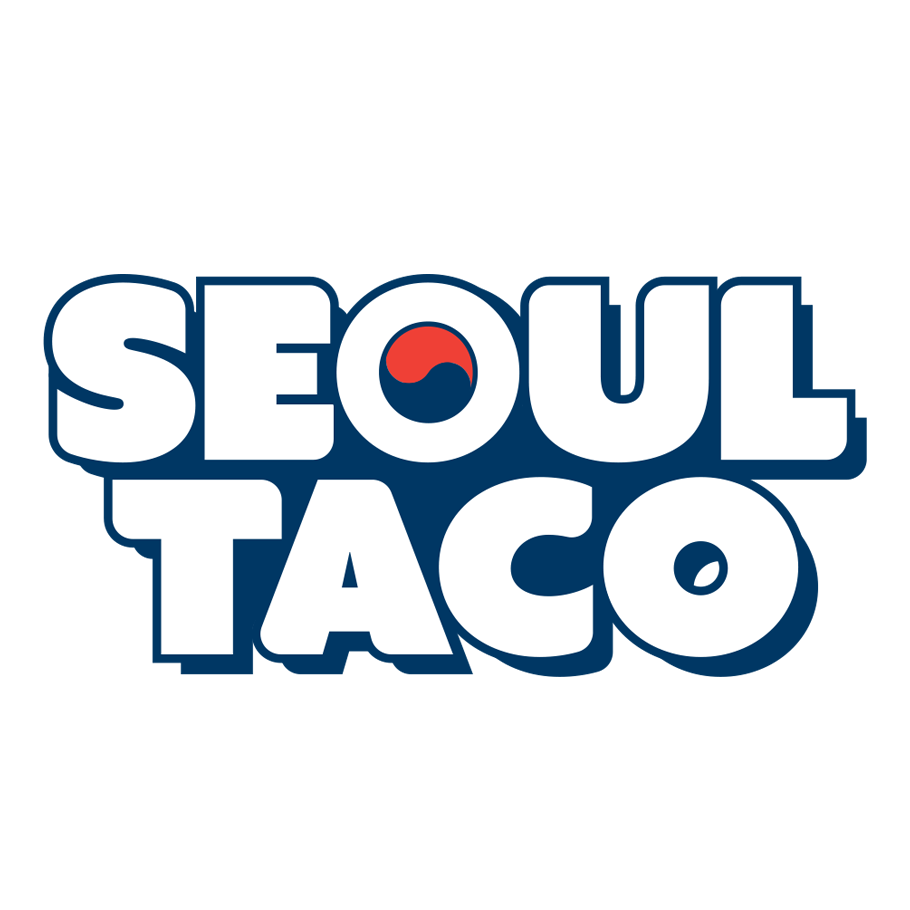
- Industry: Restaurant chain
- Founded: 2011; 15 years ago
- Founder: David Choi
- Headquarters: St. Louis, Missouri, United States
- Number of locations: 9 (2024)
- Area served: Missouri, Chicago metropolitan area
- Products: Korean-Mexican fusion, Korean tacos
- Website: www.seoultaco.com

Seoul Taco is a Korean-Mexican fusion fast-casual restaurant chain originally from St. Louis, Missouri, United States. As of April 2024, the chain had nine locations in the Missouri and Chicago metropolitan areas.

== History ==
The chain was founded in 2011 as a food truck. It was founded by Korean American entrepreneur David Choi in St. Louis. Choi had no formal culinary training, and instead learned cooking from his family and from the industry. He had experience in pizza, sandwich, and Chinese restaurants. Choi sold his car and purchased a food truck that was listed for $40,000 at $18,000. He also convinced his friends and family to invest another $22,000 in his business. He began making Korean tacos, which proved so popular that he was able to recoup his investment within several months. By 2012, he opened his first permanent location.

When the chain began expanding, Choi adopted a strategy of recruiting local artists to decorate new locations. In June 2016, the chain opened its first location in Chicago in River North. Its second Chicago location was Hyde Park in December 2018. By April 2023, the chain had nine locations in the Missouri and Chicago areas. In 2021, the chain announced that it hired Michelin-starred, James Beard Award–winning chef Brian Fisher as its culinary director.

In 2021, it celebrated its 10th anniversary with a block party that was headlined by Busta Rhymes. Admission was free of charge and open to the public.

== Description ==
The chain offers a variety of Korean-Mexican fusion dishes. This includes gogi (meat) bowls (bibimbap with Mexican elements), as well as nachos, burritos, and quesadillas with Korean flavors. Dishes often include kimchi and kimchi fried rice. The chain introduced a "Munchwrap Seoulpreme", inspired by the Crunchwrap Supreme dish from Taco Bell. Alcohol is served at some locations, with both beer and liquor, particularly Korean-inspired drinks, offered. The menu has been described as fairly small by intent; this is to ensure that each of the dishes are well-executed.

Decorations in the chain often feature taekwondo fighters wearing luchador masks. Elements of Japanese culture and hip hop are also present in the design.
