= Korean taco =

Korean-Mexican fusion dish in America

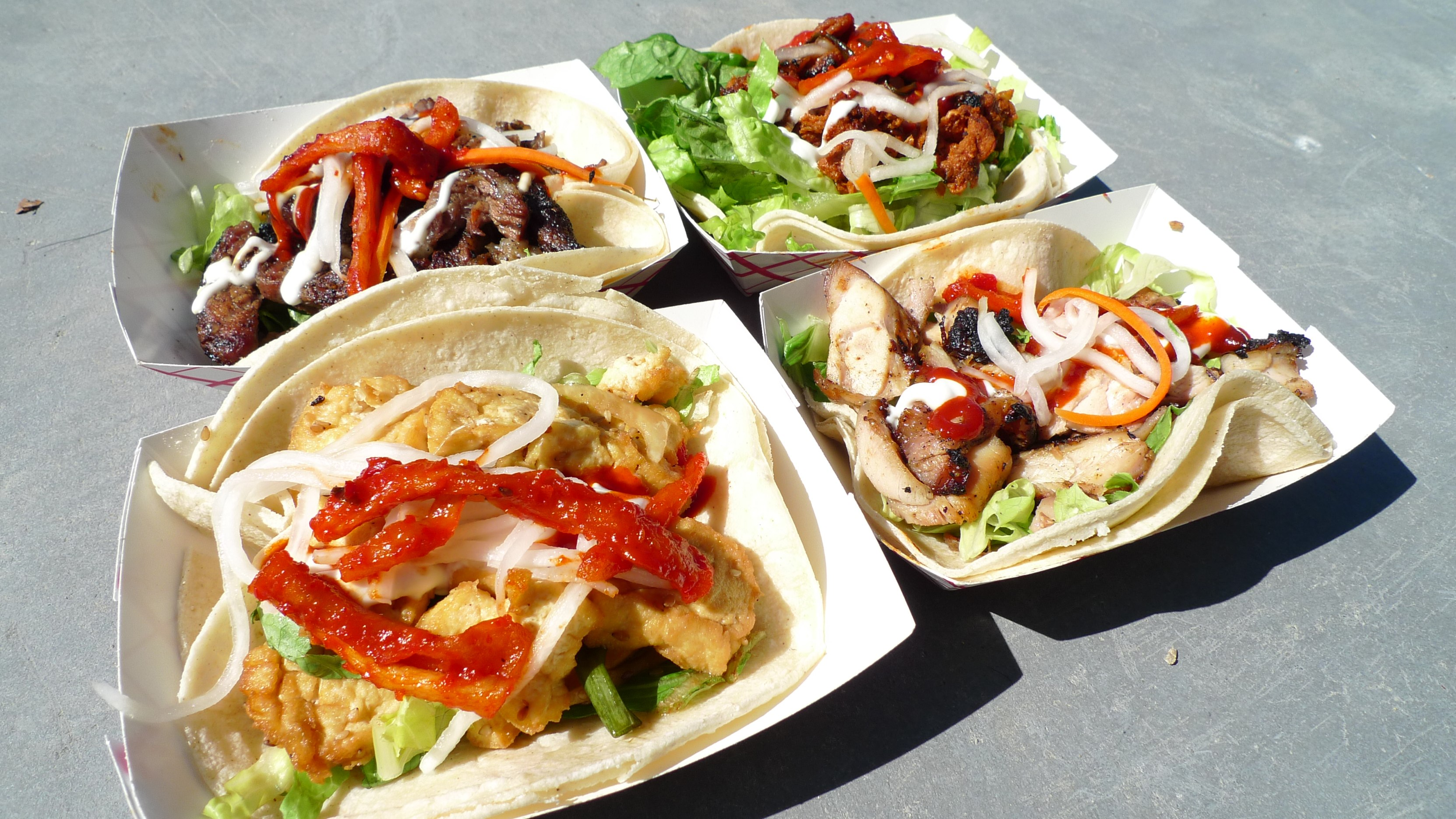
Korean tacos, a fusion dish combining Korean cuisine flavors with the Mexican taco, served from the "Seoul on Wheels" food truck in San Francisco.

Korean tacos are a Korean-Mexican fusion dish popular in a number of urban areas in the United States and Canada. Korean tacos originated in Los Angeles, often as street food, consisting of Korean-style fillings, such as bulgogi and kimchi, placed on top of small traditional Mexican corn tortillas. Korean burritos are a similarly themed dish, using larger flour tortillas as a wrap.

== History ==
Although various restaurants have occasionally served dishes they called Korean tacos, the popularity of the dish is generally traced to the use of Twitter by the proprietors of the Kogi Korean BBQ, a food truck in Los Angeles, California, to announce their schedule and itinerary. The idea of making Korean tacos came to owner Mark Manguera after an unsuccessful search of Los Angeles' Koreatown for carne asada tacos. In its first year of operation, Kogi generated an estimated $2 million of revenue.

Korean taco trucks later appeared in Portland, Oregon (the "Koi Fusion" truck), Austin, Texas (the Chi'Lantro BBQ truck), and Seattle, Washington ("Marination Mobile", whose spicy pork Korean taco earned them Good Morning America's Best Food Truck in America). In San Francisco the dish was popularized in 2009 by Namu Restaurant's Happy Belly food cart in Golden Gate Park, later moving to a farmers market food stand at the San Francisco Ferry Building. The dish's popularity led mainstream fast food chain Baja Fresh to test market Korean tacos as a menu item in California, with plans to introduce the dish to hundreds of locations nationwide. In 2011, David Choi founded Seoul Taco as a food truck in St. Louis, and expanded the business to nine locations in Chicago and Missouri by 2023.

In April 2010, Food & Wine magazine named Roy Choi, the chef of the original Kogi's, one of its annual "Best New Chefs". It was the first time a food truck chef had been nominated for the award.

== See also ==
- Burrito
- Korean-Mexican fusion
- Popiah
- Ssam
