= Koi Fusion =

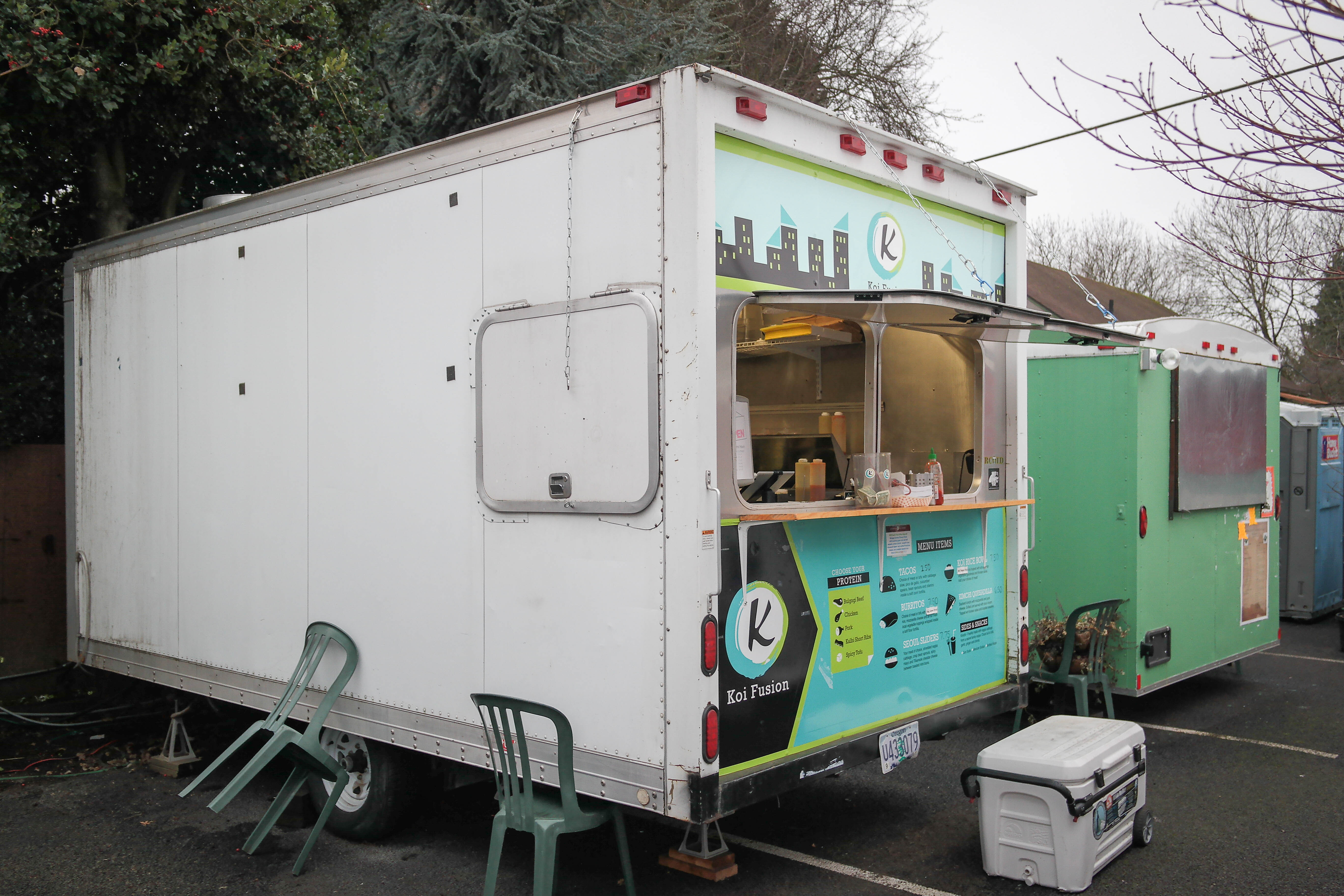
- Koi Fusion food cart at the Mississippi Marketplace pod in Portland, Oregon, 2013

Restaurant information
- Owner: Bo Kwon
- Location: Oregon, United States
- Website: koifusionpdx.com

Koi Fusion (styled as KOi Fusion) is a restaurant chain in the Portland metropolitan area, United States.

== Description ==
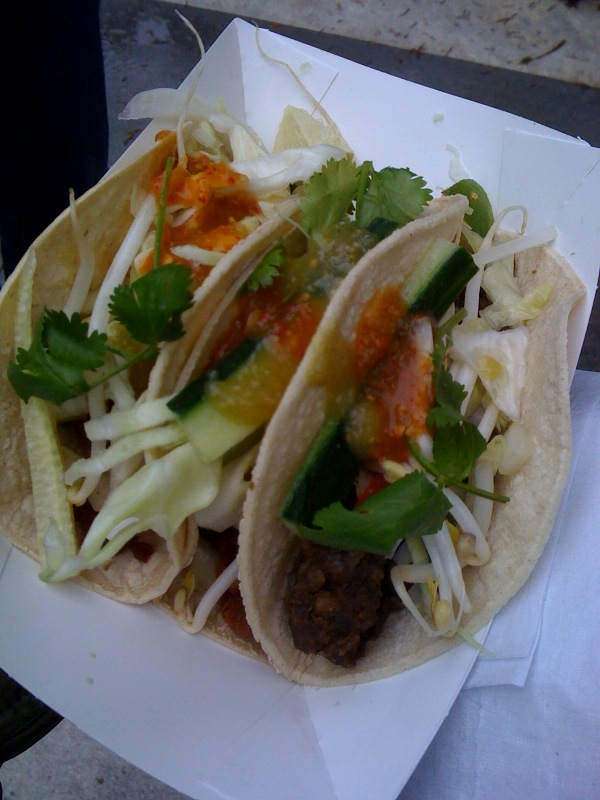
Tacos from Koi Fusion in 2010

Koi Fusion operates food carts and brick and mortar restaurants in the Portland metropolitan area. The restaurant serves Korean-Mexican fusion, using ingredients like bulgogi, kimchi, and mung bean sprouts, as well as pico de gallo, salsa, and tortillas. Koi Fusion also serves a hot dog with kimchi sauerkraut, Japanese mayonnaise, and barbecued Korean meat.

== History ==
Bo Kwon is the owner. He was inspired by Roy Choi's Kogi Korean BBQ in Los Angeles. Early on, he would share where his Koi Fusion food cart was located via social media.

In 2010, Kwon opened K'fusion on Second Avenue in southwest Portland. Koi Fusion began operating at Portland International Airport in 2014. A food cart was burglarized at 20th Avenue and West Burnside Street in 2017. Kwon opened a Koi Fusion shop in Wilsonville in 2017.

Koi Fusion has also operated on Division Street in southeast Portland and at Prost Marketplace in the north Portland part of the Boise neighborhood.

== Reception ==
Koi Fusion was a runner-up in the Best Food Cart category of Willamette Week's annual 'Best of Portland' readers' poll in 2010 and 2015.

== See also ==
- Korean taco
- List of Korean restaurants
- List of Mexican restaurants
- List of restaurant chains in the United States
