= Crunchwrap Supreme =

Fast food item

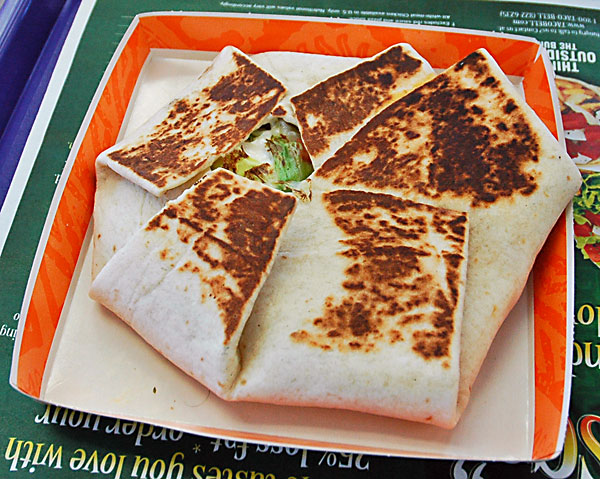

Nutritional value per 1 Crunchwrap Supreme
- Energy: 530 kcal (2,200 kJ)
- Carbohydrates: 73g
- Sugars: 6g
- Dietary fiber: 6g
- Fat: 20g
- Saturated: 7g
- Trans: 0g
- Protein: 15g
Vitamins and minerals
Vitamins	Quantity %DV^{†}
Vitamin D	1% 0.1 μg
Minerals	Quantity %DV^{†}
Calcium	19% 250 mg
Iron	28% 5 mg
Potassium	18% 530 mg
- Other constituents: Quantity
- Cholesterol: 20mg
- ^{†}Percentages estimated using US recommendations for adults, except for potassium, which is estimated based on expert recommendation from the National Academies. Source: "Crunchwrap Supreme®". Taco Bell.

The Crunchwrap Supreme is a filled tortilla pocket sold at the fast-food chain Taco Bell. It contains a corn tostada with meat and other ingredients wrapped inside a larger soft flour tortilla, which is folded inward from the edges and grilled. It was introduced in 2005 and became one of the most popular items on the menu. The concept has inspired knock-off variations by restaurant chefs and social media users.

== Description ==
Crunchwrap Supreme internally contains a crunchy corn tostada that separates a lower wet warm layer from the upper cold layer. The warm layer contains nacho cheese sauce and seasoned beef. The cold layer is sour cream, shredded lettuce, and diced tomatoes. It is constructed in layers, first laying out the soft flour tortilla, the warm ingredients are added, the tostada divider layered over top of the meat, the cold foods added on top of the tostada, then the wrap is closed over the whole and folded shut.

== History ==
The Crunchwrap Supreme was created by Lois Carson, a former member of Taco Bell's food innovation staff. The idea was to create a menu item that could be easily eaten on the go or in the car without making a mess. It was introduced as a special menu item on June 22, 2005, and became a permanent part of the menu in 2006. It sold 51 million units in its first six weeks—the fastest-selling item in Taco Bell history.

The Crunchwrap Supreme has influenced chefs and social media users; in 2025, one cook said that it is no longer a gimmick sold by Taco Bell but "an acceptable form, like the burrito." For example, at a restaurant in Brooklyn, the "Cwunch Wap Supweme" includes halal ground beef and homemade queso (cheese sauce). A restaurant in Oregon folds bulgogi and pickled banchan into a "Munchwrap Extreme". A restaurant in Los Angeles makes a "Grapow Crunchwrap Supreme" that replaces the tostada with a fried wonton wrapper and the ground beef with pad grapow gai. "As long as you have that crunchy thing in the middle and you know how to fold it, you can put anything in there," said one cook. Taco Bell does not enforce its patent and sees indies as free advertising. Further capitalizing on the trend, Taco Bell sold Crunchwrap Supremes with ingredients inspired by 3 chefs—Reuben Asaram, Jennifer Hwa Dobbertin, and Lawrence Smith—at New York City locations in 2024 prior to selling them nationwide.

Taco Bell has released limited edition variations of the Crunchwrap Supreme such as "The Big Cheez-It" from June 6, 2024 through July 17, 2024. Steak & Queso Crunchwrap Sliders were sold beginning February 27, 2025, as part of the 20th anniversary celebration of the original Crunchwrap Supreme, sold as a limited-time menu item. Taco Bell has also sold test-kitchen Crunchwrap variants through limited pop-ups and regional tests, including the Indian Buffet, Crispy Thai Noodle, and Southwest Hot CHX Crunchwrap Supremes. In 2026, Taco Bell released a variation called the "Crispy Chicken Crunchwrap Slider".

After a 2011 class action lawsuit claimed that its "seasoned beef" filling did not use enough beef to be called beef, the company began an aggressive marketing campaign in which it defended its filling as 88% beef and briefly offered Crunchwrap Supremes for 88 cents from the normal cost of $2.39. The amount of meat used in the company's products, including the Crunchwrap Supreme, was a focus of a class action lawsuit filed in New York in 2023.

== See also ==
- Enchirito
- Big Mac
- Whopper
