= Priszm =

Defunct Canadian Business

Priszm Income Fund
- Type: Public
- Industry: Restaurants
- Headquarters: Vaughan, Ontario, Canada
- Number of locations: 746
- Area served: British Columbia, Alberta, Manitoba, Ontario, Quebec, New Brunswick, Nova Scotia
- Revenue: C$450 million
- Number of employees: 9,000
- Website: www.priszm.com

Priszm LP was the largest operator of Canadian fast food restaurants. The Priszm Income Fund, an income trust, owned 60.2% of Priszm.

Priszm was one of the largest franchisees of Yum! Brands in the world, owning over 746 restaurants of various Yum!-owned chains in Canada, namely KFC, Pizza Hut, Taco Bell, and WingStreet. The majority of its locations were KFC restaurants, some of which are co-branded with the Taco Bell and Pizza Hut brands. Priszm was also responsible for KFC's national marketing and promotions within Canada from 2003 to 2009. The close relationship between the two companies extends to sharing the same Canadian headquarters in Vaughan, Ontario.

All stores have been sold by the end of 2012.
