= Chi'Lantro BBQ =

Korean-Mexican fusion food truck in Austin, Texas

- Chi'Lantro BBQ logo
- Industry: Restaurant, food trucks
- Founded: United States (2010)
- Headquarters: Austin, Texas
- Owner: Jae Kim
- Website: Official website

Chi'Lantro BBQ is a Korean-Mexican fusion mobile truck and catering service which opened in Austin, Texas in 2010. Since then, the former food truck operation has opened ten restaurants in the Austin area. The name "Chi'Lantro" is a portmanteau of "kimchi" and "cilantro", two distinct cultural staples aiming to reinvent traditional Korean and Mexican cuisine. They are known as the originator of a dish known as "Kimchi Fries".

== History ==
In February 2010, the business was opened by Jae Kim, who was born in Korea and moved to the U.S. when he was eleven years old. He graduated from California State University, Fullerton and opened his first food business at twenty-one, a coffee shop called "Foothill Café", which he owned for three years. At age twenty-six, he relocated to the "culturally diverse" Austin area to open the food truck business.

The food truck operations initially served only the Austin and Fort Hood, Texas areas before expanding beyond the Austin market in early 2012 with food truck service in Houston. Service was discontinued in December 2014, when Jae Kim started looking for a restaurant space.

On January 19, 2015, an Austin storefront restaurant was opened.

As of 2023, Chi'Lantro owns and operates over ten locations throughout Austin, Texas and one location in the Heights neighborhood in Houston, TX.

== Menu ==
The menu features hybrid cuisine inspired by Korean and Mexican food traditions. Items include Kimchi Fries, Ssäms (Korean for wrap), Curated Bowls, Korean Fried Chicken Wings and more to share items. Ingredients include combinations of Korean BBQ Steak, Japchae noodles, Chi'Jeu Queso, house made toppings and sauces and fresh veggies. Its signature menu item, the Kimchi Fries, are covered in Korean BBQ, caramelized kimchi, shredded cheese, onion, chopped fresh cilantro, magic sauce, sriracha and sesame seeds.

== Style of operation ==
Prior to opening a restaurant location, the business functioned primarily as a mobile kitchen or food truck. The trucks make scheduled stops in the mornings, afternoons and evenings in highly commercial areas, in areas that appeal to consumers in the white-collar workforce, in addition to manual laborers, the stereotypical customers for such establishments. Another part of the service is catering for parties, corporate events, promotions, weddings, festivals, conventions, and various large social events in the area. As of 2020, food truck operation is no longer available.

In January 2015, a small brick and mortar location opened, adding an eat-in option to their outdoor service.

As of April 18, 2016 all Chi'lantro brick and mortars will not accept cash. All locations support Apple Pay, Samsung Pay and all major credit and debit cards.

== Media ==
The business makes extensive use of social media applications such as Twitter, Foursquare, Yelp, and Facebook to connect with a "tech savvy" customer base. Publishing of tweets keeps customers informed about where each truck is going to be located. The trucks are one of the many food trucks nationwide to pioneer the use of Android and Apple mobile devices for credit card transactions and the organization of finances.

== Recognition ==
By 2011, the food trucks had been featured on the Food Network and the Cooking Channel; and, in 2014, were named one of Huffington Post's favorite food trucks at SXSW. In November 2016, founder Jae Kim appeared on Season 8 Episode 8 of ABC's Shark Tank and secured a $600,000 investment from Barbara Corcoran for a 20% stake in Chi'Lantro BBQ.

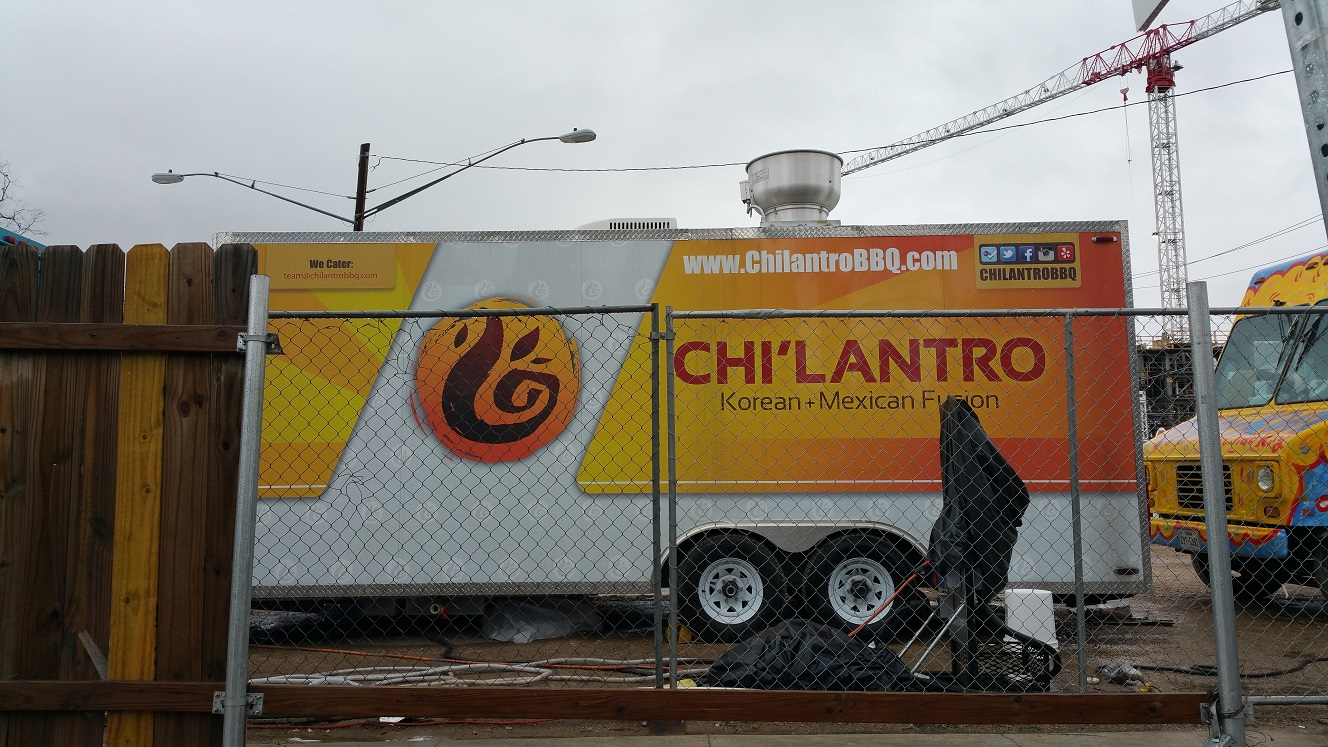
2015 SXSW food truck lot

== See also ==
- KoMex
- List of food trucks
