= Taco Bell =

American fast-food chain

Taco Bell Corporation
- Taco Bell's logo used since September 2023

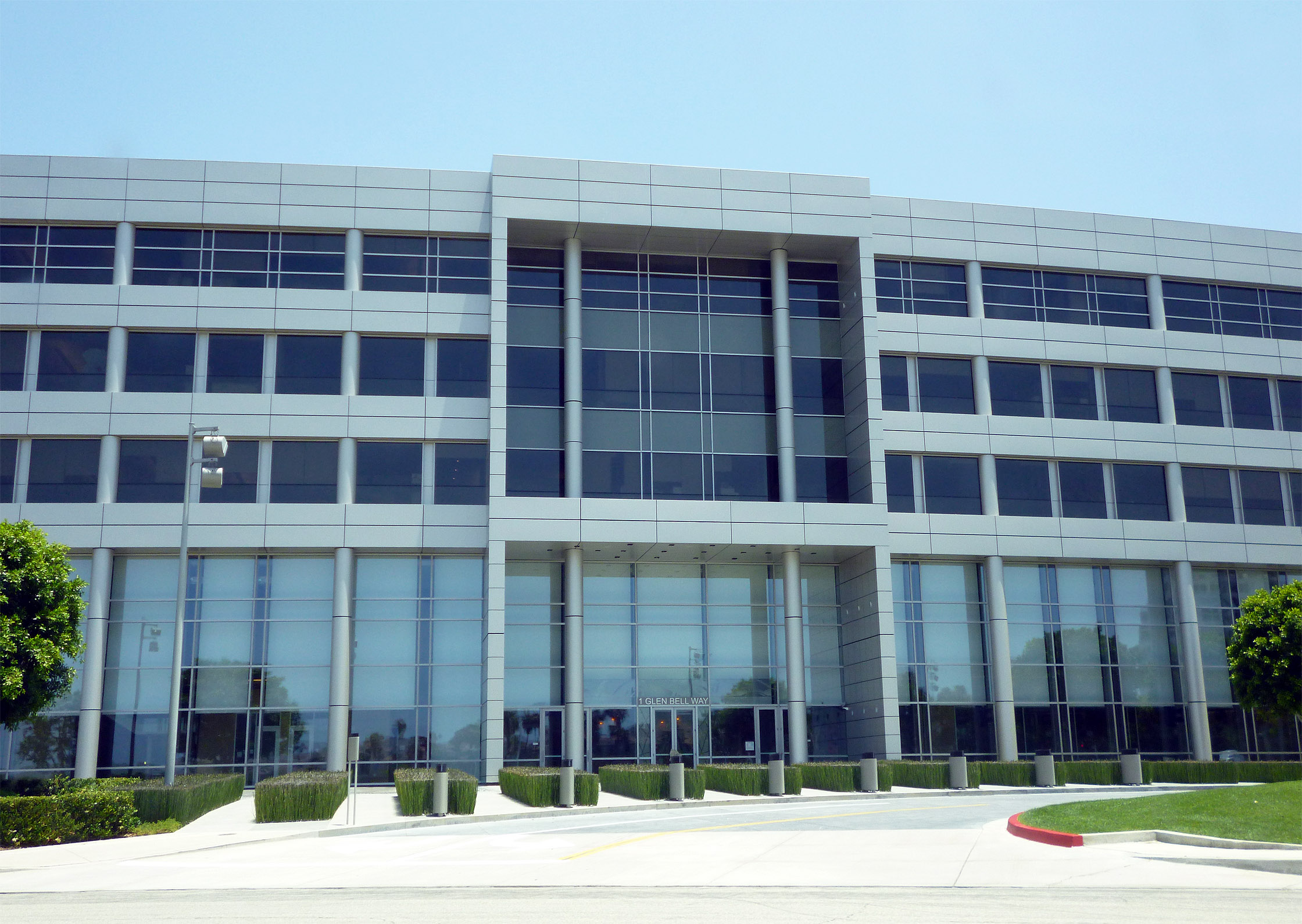
- Headquarters in Irvine, California
- Trade name: Taco Bell
- Formerly: Taco Bell Corp.
- Type: Subsidiary
- Industry: Restaurant
- Genre: Fast food
- Founded: March 21, 1962; 64 years ago Downey, California, U.S.
- Founder: Glen Bell
- Headquarters: 1 Glen Bell Way, Irvine, California, U.S. (2009–present)
- Number of locations: 9,030 (2025)
- Areas served: List: Aruba; Australia; Bosnia and Herzegovina; Brazil; Canada; Chile; China; Colombia; Costa Rica; Cyprus; Dominican Republic; El Salvador; Finland; Greece; Guam; Guatemala; India; Indonesia; Japan; Kuwait; Malaysia; Netherlands; New Zealand; Panama; Peru; Philippines; Portugal; Puerto Rico; Romania; Saudi Arabia; Serbia; South Korea; Spain; Sri Lanka; Sweden; Thailand; United Kingdom; United States
- Key people: Sean Tresvant (CEO); Taylor Montgomery (Global chief brand officer)
- Products: Tacos; burritos
- Revenue: ▲US$3.095 billion (2025)
- Operating income: ▲US$1.129 billion (2025)
- Parent: Yum! Brands except China; Yum China within China
- Website: tacobell.com

Taco Bell Corporation, doing business as Taco Bell, is an American multinational chain of fast food restaurants founded in 1962 by Glen Bell (1923–2010) in Downey, California. Taco Bell is a subsidiary of Yum! Brands, Inc., who are also the owners of sister brand KFC. The restaurants serve a variety of Mexican-inspired foods, including tacos, burritos, quesadillas, nachos, novelty, and specialty items, and a variety of "value menu" items. As of 2023, Taco Bell serves over two billion customers each year, at 8,212 restaurants, more than 94 percent of which are owned and operated by independent franchisees and licensees.

PepsiCo purchased Taco Bell in 1978. PepsiCo spun off its restaurants division in 1997 as Tricon Global Restaurants; in 2002 it changed its name to Yum! Brands.

== History ==
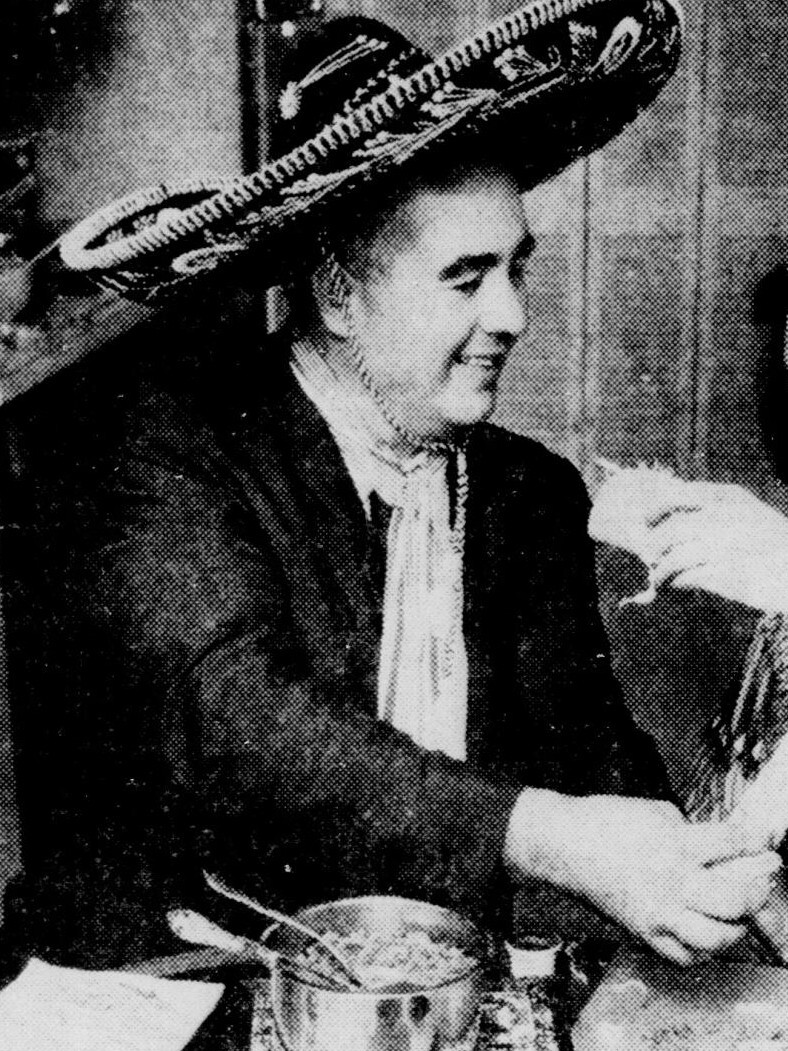
Glen Bell, the founder of Taco Bell

Taco Bell was founded by Glen Bell, an entrepreneur who first opened a hot dog stand called Bell's Drive-In, in San Bernardino, California, in 1948. Bell watched long lines of customers at a Mexican restaurant called the Mitla Cafe, located across the street, which became famous among residents for its hard-shelled tacos. Bell attempted to reverse-engineer the recipe, and eventually the owners, along with head chef Gloria Hoyle, allowed him to see how the tacos were made. Hoyle (Mitla Cafe still has a special named after her today) taught Glen Bell her version of the Dorado taco style which Mitla Cafe was known for. Bell took what he had learned and opened a taco stand in 1951. The name underwent several changes, from Taco-Tia through El Taco, before settling on Taco Bell.

Glen Bell opened the first Taco Bell on July 6, 1962 at 7112 Firestone Boulevard in Downey, California. The original location was a 400-square-foot (37 m^{2}) building about the size of a two-car garage, and was built with mission-style arches that covered a walk-up window that served the original menu items: tacos, burritos, tostadas, Chiliburgers and frijoles, all for 19 cents each ($2 in 2025 dollars). The first restaurant closed in 1986, while the building was saved from demolition November 19, 2015, and was moved 45 miles (72 km) to the Taco Bell Corporate Office at 1 Glen Bell Way in Irvine, California, and is currently stored intact on the corporate parking lot premises and known as "Taco Bell Numero Uno". Currently, there is a Taco Bell location across the street at 7127 Firestone Blvd, in Downey, which opened in 1996. The oldest operating Taco Bell location is store #2 (now operating as store #40400) at 1822 Santa Fe, in Long Beach, CA, which opened on August 7, 1962. Initially designed exactly like "Numero Uno", the building has since been remodeled extensively. Two former "Numero Uno" buildings still operate as other businesses, including another one in Long Beach, California (opened in early 1963), and one in Hawaiian Gardens, California (opened as store #3 in September 1962).

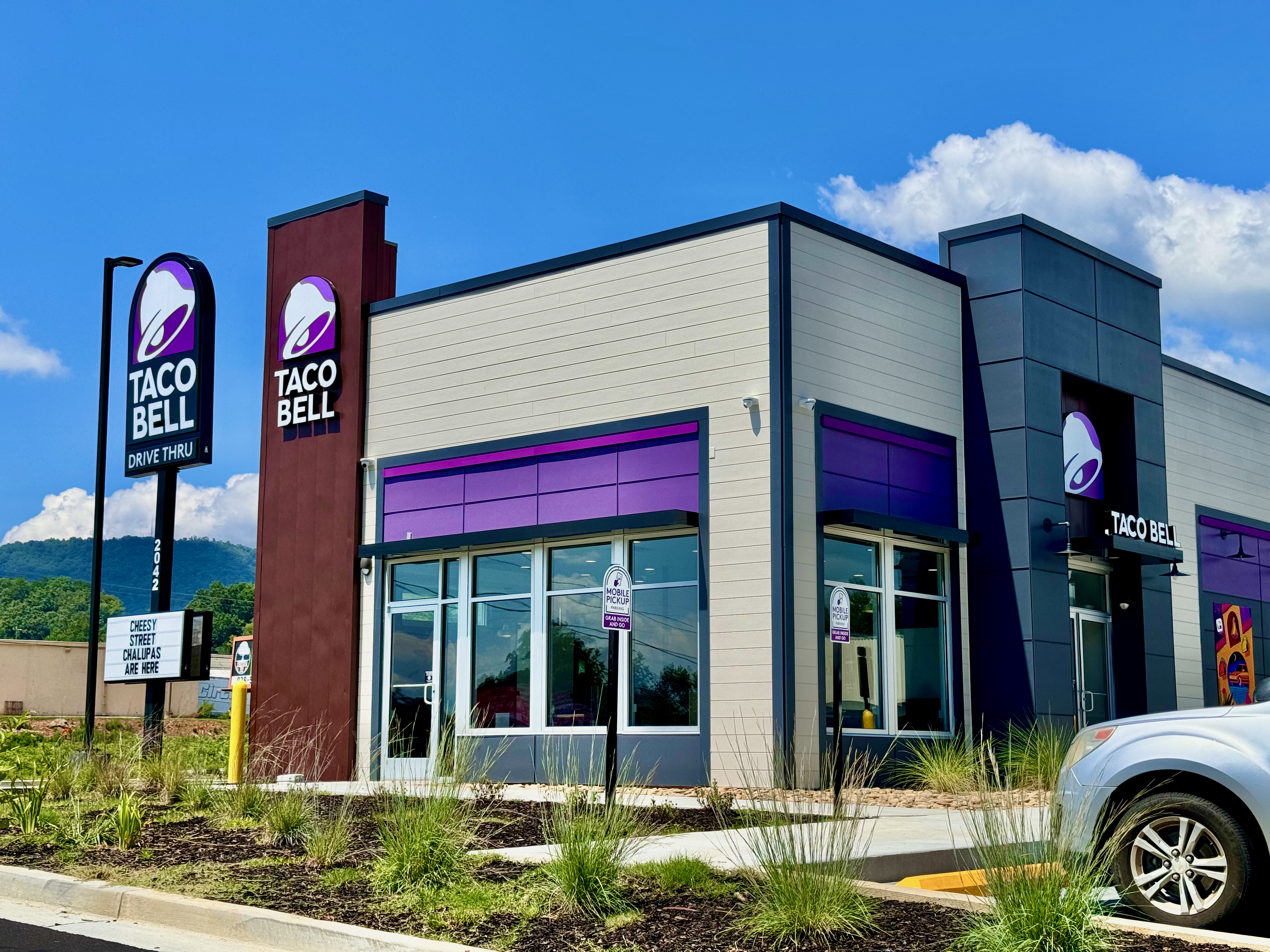
Exterior of a modern Taco Bell in Murphy, North Carolina

In 1964, the first franchise was purchased by former police officer Kermit Bekke. This location, located at 1654 West Carson Street in Torrance, California, had its grand opening on May 28, 1965. Bekke sold his franchise a year and a half later. This location closed in 1975 when it moved across the street to store #1130 at 1619 West Carson Street, which itself would close in the late 1990s and subsequently be repurposed. On January 20, 1967, the 100th Taco Bell grand opening took place in Anaheim, located at 400 South Brookhurst (store #63); this location would later be replaced by a new location at 324 South Brookhurst in 1993. The first Taco Bell restaurant east of the Mississippi River (the 270th to open, store #258) opened at 2050 East Main Street in Springfield, Ohio, on September 20, 1968. Original Taco Bells featured only walk-up window service without indoor seating or drive-thru service. Inside seating was added sporadically in 1968 and drive-thru service was not generally available until 1980. As of 2025, seven original mission-style operating Taco Bell restaurants still remain, located in California and Colorado. A mission-style location (opened in April 1976) that operated in Honolulu, Hawaii (store #1281) remodeled in 2024, and another Mission-style location in Scottsdale, Arizona (store #31, opened circa July 3, 1966) closed on April 12, 2025.

The corporate office has had a few locations, and previously maintained an office at 2516 Via Tejon in Palos Verdes, then at 2424 Moreton Street in Torrance before settling into Irvine (at 17901 Von Karman Avenue) in 1976.

=== PepsiCo subsidiary ===
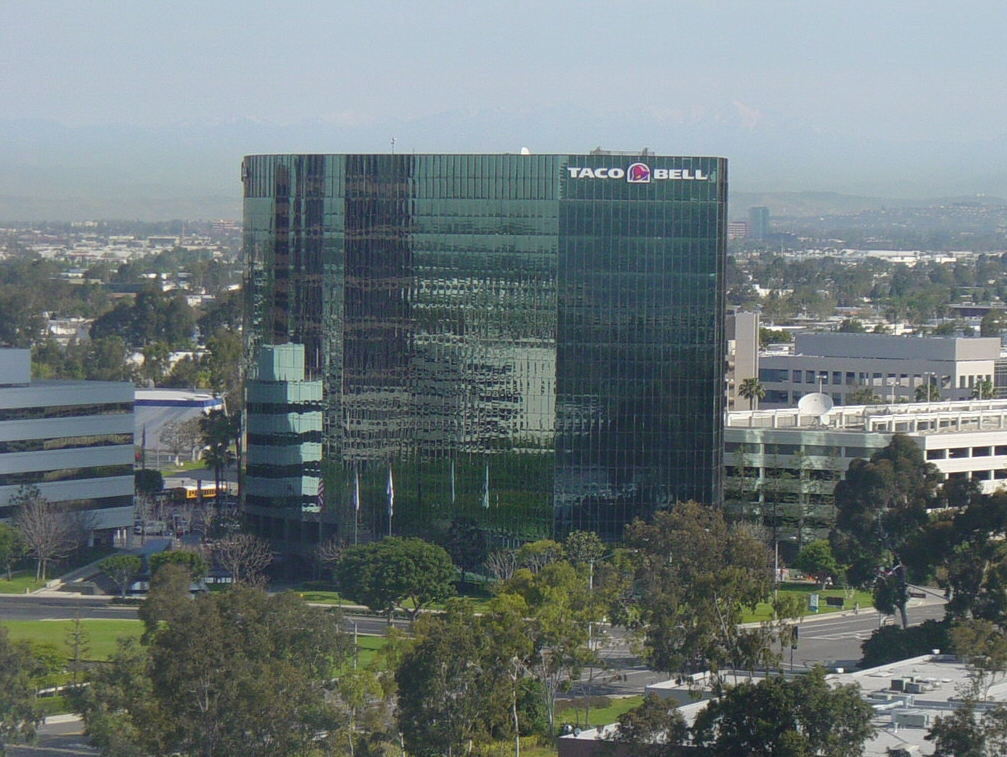
Former headquarters at 17901 Von Karman Avenue in Irvine, California

In 1978, PepsiCo purchased Taco Bell from Glen Bell. In the 1980s, Taco Bell entered rapid expansion when it acquired several other fast food joints and turned those locations into their own. This included Taco Charley, a San Mateo, California-based chain, in 1982, Pup 'N' Taco, a Long Beach, California-based chain in 1984, and Zantigo, a Minneapolis, Minnesota-based Mexican chain, in 1986. These acquisitions (and later conversions) resulted in many early Taco Bell stores closing and moving to these newer facilities. Taco Bell also dropped its existing Mexican-based branding, replacing it with a more mainstream design in 1984. In 1990, the Hot 'n Now chain was acquired. Taco Bell sold Hot 'n Now to a Connecticut company in 1997.

Taco Bell inside West Town Mall in Knoxville, Tennessee

In 1991, Taco Bell opened the first Taco Bell Express in San Francisco. Taco Bell Express locations operate primarily inside convenience stores, truck stops, shopping malls, and airports; this concept had been experimented with as early as 1984, with several test mall locations opening. Taco Bell began co-branding with KFC in 1995 when the first such co-brand opened in Clayton, North Carolina. The chain has since co-branded with Pizza Hut and Long John Silver's as well.

In 1997, PepsiCo experimented with a new "fresh grill" concept, opening at least one Border Bell restaurant in Mountain View, California, on El Camino Real (SR 82). Close to the time that PepsiCo spun off its restaurant business in 1997, the Border Bell in Mountain View was closed and converted to a Taco Bell restaurant which was still open in 2018.

In September 2000, up to $50 million worth of Taco Bell-branded shells were recalled from supermarkets. The shells contained a variety of genetically modified corn called StarLink that was not approved for human consumption. StarLink was approved only for use in animal feed because of questions about whether it can cause allergic reactions in people. It was the first-ever recall of genetically modified food (GMO). Corn was not segregated at grain elevators and the miller in Texas did not order that type. In 2001, Tricon Global announced a $60 million settlement with the suppliers. They stated that it would go to Taco Bell franchisees and TGR would not take any of it.

=== Yum! Brands subsidiary ===
PepsiCo spun out Taco Bell and its other restaurant chains in late 1997 in Tricon Global Restaurants. With the purchase of Yorkshire Global Restaurants, the owners of A&W and Long John Silver's chains, Tricon changed its name to Yum! Brands on May 16, 2002.

In March 2005, the Coalition of Immokalee Workers (CIW) won a landmark victory in its national boycott of Taco Bell for human rights. Taco Bell agreed to meet all the coalition's demands to improve wage and working conditions for Florida tomato pickers in its supply chain. After four years of boycott, Taco Bell and Yum! Brands agreed to make an agreement called the CIW-Yum agreement with representatives of CIW at Yum! Brands headquarters.

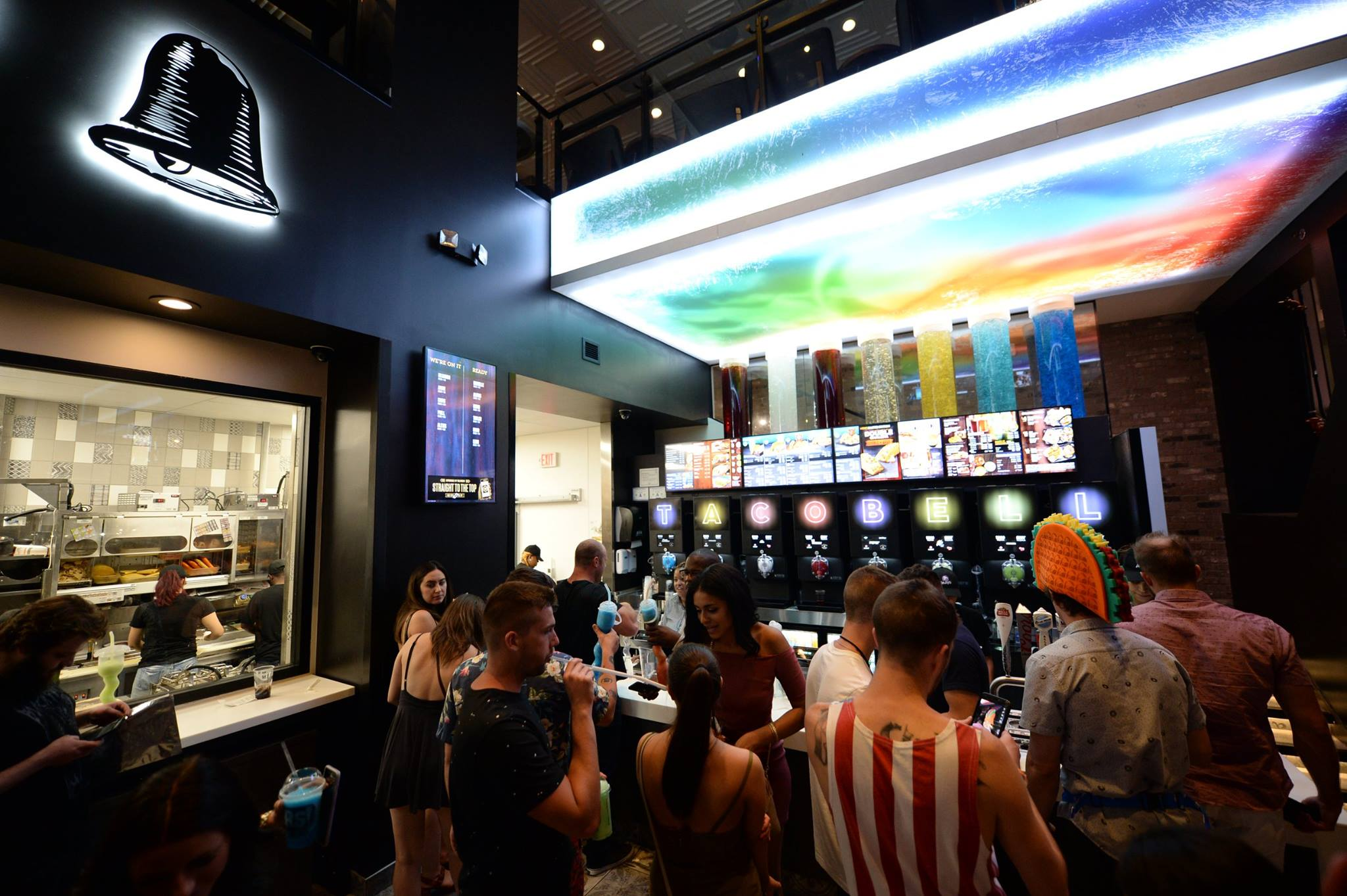
The downstairs interior of the Taco Bell Cantina flagship store in Las Vegas, Nevada

Taco Bell began experimenting with fast-casual and urban concepts when it created U.S. Taco Co. and Urban Taproom in 2014 reflecting a market shift due to the popularity of Chipotle Mexican Grill. The menu consisted of tacos with American fillings, and did not sell the food sold in Taco Bell restaurants, such as burritos. It was launched in Huntington Beach, California, in August 2014.

U.S. Taco Co. closed on September 15, 2015, so the company could focus on its new similar Taco Bell Cantina concept, which featured special menu items and served alcohol. It opened its first location a few days later in Chicago's Wicker Park neighborhood, followed by a location in San Francisco about a month later, located less than a block away from AT&T Park. In 2016, Taco Bell launched the Taco Bell Cantina flagship store located on the Las Vegas Strip. The 24-hour restaurant serves alcohol, unique menu items, and features a DJ. It was announced in August 2017 that the store would begin hosting weddings. Taco Bell Cantina currently has locations in San Francisco, Berkeley, Chicago (2 locations), Las Vegas, Austin, Fayetteville, Cincinnati, Cleveland, Atlanta, Newport Beach, San Diego, San Jose, Sacramento, Nashville, with them once having plans to open soon in Somerville, Massachusetts, but as of 2025, there are instead Taco Bell Cantinas in Brookline and Allston, Massachusetts. In March 2020, Taco Bell announced that it would be converting 3 of its suburban stores into Cantinas that year as part of a test run.

In March 2016, Taco Bell introduced private beta testing of an artificial intelligence bot on the messaging platform Slack designed to take orders of select menu items from local Taco Bell locations and have the orders delivered. Taco Bell planned to have a wider roll-out of this functionality in the coming months.

Previously, Taco Bell's hot sauces were only available in packets at the chain itself. In February 2014, Taco Bell made its hot sauces available at grocery stores, sold in bottles. These would be followed by further grocery store products including chips in May 2018 and shredded cheese in 2019. In September 2016, Taco Bell opened a pop-up in New York City in the SoHo, Manhattan area called the Taco Bell VR Arcade. Taco Bell and VR fans could demo PlayStation VR, games, and food.

In 2016, Taco Bell debuted a modular restaurant constructed from five reclaimed shipping containers at the South by Southwest (SXSW) festival in Austin, Texas. Following its successful reception, the structure was permanently relocated to South Gate, California, where it commenced operations as a standard franchise location in 2017. The restaurant features Taco Bell's full menu, with outdoor seating, a walk-up window, and a drive-thru, but no indoor seating unlike regular Taco Bell locations. Taco Bell announced plans in November 2017 to open 300 more urban and Cantina-style locations by 2022, with 50 to be located about New York City's five boroughs. In 2019, Taco Bell opened a pop-up hotel called "The Bell: A Taco Bell Hotel and Resort" for one weekend in August. Upon the announcement, the hotel was booked up in two minutes.

Taco Bell announced plans to keep its current corporate headquarters in Irvine until 2030.

== Menu and advertising ==
The first Taco Bell commercials premiered in 1968, featuring advertisements with Mel Blanc, Pat Harrington, and the then-host of Truth or Consequences, Bob Barker.

In 1992, Johnny Cash starred in a television commercial for Taco Bell's value menu.

In 1993, Taco Bell was used as product placement and plot device in the movie Demolition Man updating their currently used logo.

From August 1997 to July 2000, Gidget the Chihuahua was the brand's advertising mascot, a campaign developed by TBWA. Voiced by Carlos Alazraqui, slogans included “¡Yo quiero Taco Bell!” (I want Taco Bell!), “Drop the Chalupa,” and “¡Viva Gorditas!” All became catchphrases in popular culture.

In 2000, Taco Bell: Tasty Temple Challenge was released for DOS by Taco Bell as the publisher and developed by BrandGames as a kid-friendly first-person 3D action shooter with gameplay similar to that of Doom and Wolfenstein 3D in terms of combat and exploration, serving as an advertisement for the brand. The player controls Baja Bill, who explores a temple of a lost jungle civilization, battling snakes and scorpions with Taco Bell's hot and wild sauce. Food from the brand also appears in game and is used to replenish the protagonist's health.

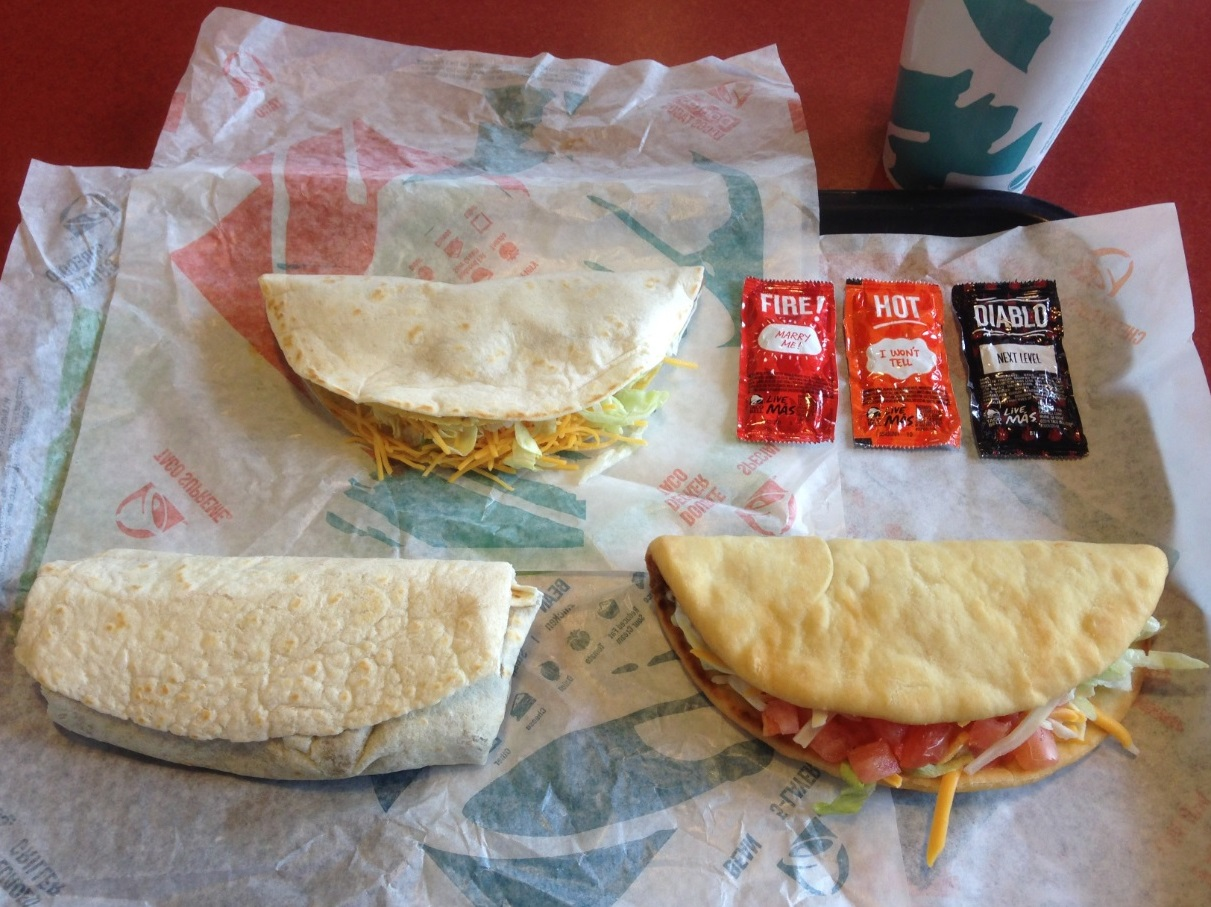
Several Taco Bell menu items. Clockwise from lower right: chalupa supreme, combo burrito, double decker taco

In March 2001, Taco Bell announced a promotion to coincide with the re-entry of the Mir space station. They towed a large target out into the Pacific Ocean, announcing that if the target was hit by a falling piece of Mir, every person in the United States would be entitled to a free Taco Bell taco. The company bought a sizable insurance policy for this gamble. No piece of the station struck the target.

In 2004, a local Taco Bell franchisee bought the naming rights to the Boise State Pavilion in Boise, Idaho, and renamed the stadium Taco Bell Arena. Also, in 2004, Mountain Dew offered Taco Bell stores the exclusive right to carry Mountain Dew Baja Blast, a tropical lime flavor of the popular soft drink.

In 2005, Taco Bell released the menu item called the Crunchwrap Supreme as a limited-time offer. Due to its success, the Crunchwrap Supreme was made a permanent menu offering in 2006.

In 2007, Taco Bell first offered the "Steal a Base, Steal a Taco" promotion—if any player from either team stole a base in the World Series, the company would give away free tacos to everyone in the United States in a campaign similar to the Mir promotion, albeit with a much higher likelihood of being realized. After Jacoby Ellsbury of the Boston Red Sox stole a base in Game 2, the company made good on the promotion on October 30, 2007. The promotion has subsequently been offered in multiple World Series.

Taco Bell sponsors a promotion at home games for both the Portland Trail Blazers and the Cleveland Cavaliers in which everyone in attendance receives a coupon for a free Chalupa if the home team scores 100 points or more.

In 2009, Taco Bell introduced a music video style commercial entitled "It's all about the Roosevelts"; the video was composed and produced by Danny de Matos at his studio for Amber Music on behalf of DraftFCB Agency. Featuring, Varsity Fanclub's Bobby Edner, the rap music style commercial shows a group of friends gathering change as they drive toward Taco Bell. The commercial represents Taco Bell's first foray into movie theater advertising, featuring the ad during the opening previews of Transformers: Revenge of the Fallen and Public Enemies as well as screens in some movie theater lobbies.

On July 1, 2009, Taco Bell replaced 20-year sponsor McDonald's as the fast-food partner of the NBA. Taco Bell and the NBA agreed on a four-year deal allowing them to advertise on ABC, TNT, and ESPN, and NBA-themed promotions. On July 21, 2009, Gidget, the Chihuahua featured in Taco Bell ads in the late 1990s, was euthanized after suffering a stroke. She was 15 years old. 2009 commercials for the "Frutista Freeze" frozen drink feature Snowball, an Eleonora cockatoo noted for his ability to dance to human music. In an effort to promote its $2 Meal Deals, Taco Bell started a Facebook group in June 2010 to collect signatures on a petition that appeals to the Federal Reserve to produce more two-dollar bills.

A large advertising push by Taco Bell had begun in late February 2011 in response to a consumer protection lawsuit filed against the company by an Alabama law firm. The promotion sought to counter allegations that the company falsely advertised the ratio of ingredients in its beef filling for its tacos. The spots featured employees and franchisees stating that the filling has always been a mixture of 88% beef and various spices and binders and nothing else. The ad followed several full-page print ads in the New York Times and other newspapers that featured the headline "Thank you for suing us." Additionally, the chain added a new social campaign using Twitter and Facebook. The company invested heavily in the campaign, spending more than $3 million (USD) putting out its message—about 20 percent more than the company usually spends on an advertising program. The various campaigns came shortly before the company began its official response to the suit in the United States District Court for the Central District of California and were designed to bring public opinion into their camp. Various analysts stated that the company would have been better off using a grass-root campaign that involved in store advertising and other non-broadcast media. The suit was eventually withdrawn, and the company continued its advertising response by publicly requesting an apology from the suing firm of Beasley Allen. Analyst Laura Ries, of marketing strategy firm Ries & Ries, stated she believed Taco Bell's latest response was a mistake. She commented that reviving memories of a suit that the majority of the public had forgotten after the initial burst of publicity was the wrong strategy from Taco Bell.

In March 2012, Taco Bell teamed up with Frito-Lay and created the Doritos Locos Tacos, which is a taco with a Dorito Nacho Cheese flavored taco shell. In May 2012, Taco Bell released a drink named Mountain Dew A.M, a mixture of Mountain Dew and orange juice. On June 6, 2012, Taco Bell announced it would be testing a new "Cantina Menu" with upscale items in their Kentucky and California restaurants. The new menu was created by celebrity chef Lorena Garcia, and featured the addition of: Black Beans; Cilantro Rice; Citrus & Herb Marinated Chicken; and Cilantro Dressing.

The Cool Ranch Doritos Taco, became available to order on March 7, 2013. Shortly before its release, Taco Bell launched a promotion advertising that fans could get the new flavor at its stores a day early if they "just asked" on March 6. However, they neglected to inform the majority of their stores of this – leading to numerous complaints on its social media accounts and news sites from disappointed consumers who were unable to obtain the new taco.

On July 23, 2013, Taco Bell announced they were discontinuing the sale of kids' meals and accompanying toys at all of their U.S.–based restaurants by January 2014. Some outlets ceased their sale as early as July 2013.

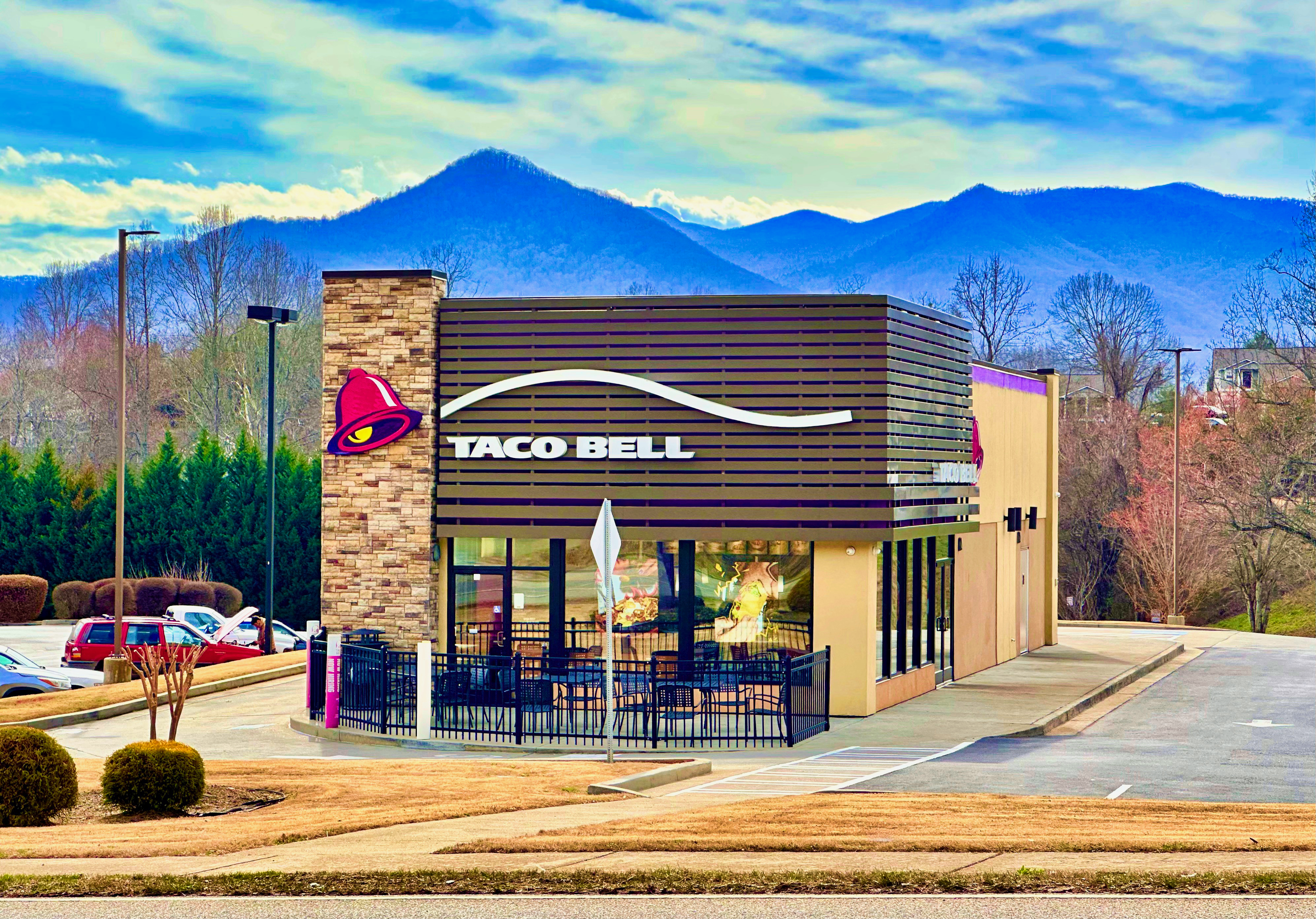
Taco Bell outlet in Hiawassee, Georgia

On August 6, 2013, the chain announced it was expanding its test market of "Waffle Tacos" to ≈100 restaurants in Fresno, California, Omaha, Nebraska, and Chattanooga, Tennessee, beginning on August 8 of that year. The Waffle Taco included scrambled eggs, sausage, and a side of syrup. It was the top–selling item during breakfast hours at the five Southern California restaurants where they had been test–released earlier in 2013. The breakfast menu started on March 27, 2014. Other items include: the A.M. Crunchwrap, Cinnabon Delights, Breakfast Burrito, A.M. Grilled Sausage Flatbread Melt, Hash Browns, Coffee and Orange Juice. The ad–campaign, which began March 27, used twenty-five men who were named Ronald McDonald, a reference to the famous clown mascot of McDonald's. Another commercial advertisement for the Waffle Taco features the narrator singing, "I've been eating Egg McMuffins since 1984. But when I saw Taco Bell made a Waffle Taco, I figured I would get with the times" set to the tune of "Old MacDonald Had a Farm"— another shot at McDonald's.

On April 28, 2014, Taco Bell ridiculed McDonald's for its "out–dated muffins", in a breakfast campaign devised by Taylor. The advertisement stated the claim that the McMuffin belonged in 1984. In October 2014, Taco Bell launched the Pink Strawberry Starburst Freeze beverage for a limited time. In August 2016, Taco Bell brought back its Pink Strawberry Starburst Freeze. In October 2015, Taco Bell launched a certified vegetarian menu.

In August 2016, Taco Bell announced it would begin testing a mashup known as Cheetos Burritos at select Taco Bell restaurants On September 19, 2016, Taco Bell launched Airheads Freeze, a drink inspired by the candy Airheads White Mystery, and allow people to guess its flavor on social media. On September 15, 2016, Taco Bell introduced the Cheddar Habanero Quesarito, a quesadilla shelled burrito. In April 2017, Taco Bell announced that it would begin testing the Naked Breakfast Taco in Flint, Michigan in mid-April. The breakfast taco, which uses a fried egg as the shell for potato bites, nacho cheese, shredded cheddar, and bacon or sausage crumble.

In 2017, the company released the Naked Chicken Chalupa that uses a chalupa shell made from chicken, using a similar idea to the Double Down and later that year the Naked Chicken Chips, which are chicken nuggets shaped like chips with nacho cheese. In July 2017, Taco Bell announced a partnership with Lyft in which Lyft passengers in Orange County, California, can request "Taco Mode" on their way to their destination from 9 PM to 2 AM, having a stop at Taco Bell. The program was cancelled after much negative feedback from drivers.

On September 21, 2018, Taco Bell announced National Taco Day celebrating its global reach outside of the United States, to be celebrated in 20 countries.

In January 2019, Taco Bell nearly doubled its television advertising spending to US$64 million. In September 2019, Taco Bell revamped its menu for the fall season.

In July 2020, Taco Bell announced the Grilled Cheese Burrito. The burrito is a recurring menu item that occasionally reappears for a limited time.

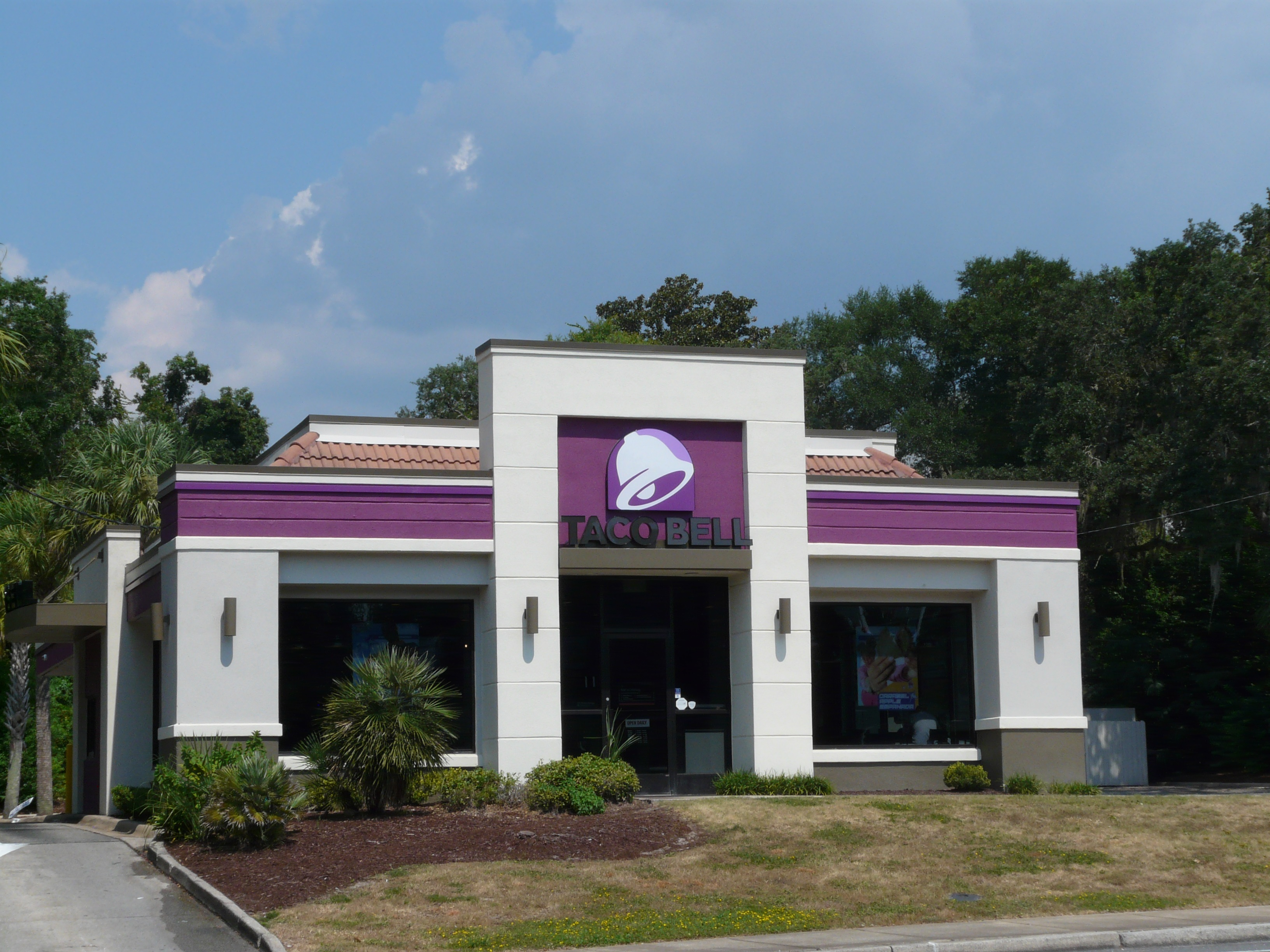
Location in Niceville, Florida

In January 2021, Taco Bell announced the return of potatoes to the menu after a brief discontinuation in August 2020 in efforts to streamline processes in their restaurants in response to the COVID-19 pandemic. In addition to the potatoes, the company had announced plans to expand their vegetarian menu by introducing Beyond Meat as a plant-based vegetarian customization option. In April 2021, Taco Bell said that it would start reusing hot sauce packets in partnership with the recycling company TerraCycle, aiming to reduce the environmental pollution. In August 2021, Taco Bell announced the Crispy Chicken Sandwich Taco.

On January 6, 2022, Taco Bell launched a digital taco subscription service called the Taco Lover's Pass through the company app. For the cost of $10, a customer can order one of seven different tacos each day for 30 consecutive days. On April 18, 2022, Taco Bell announced that Mexican Pizza would return to its menu on May 19, after its having previously been discontinued in November 2020.

From July to August 2022, filmmaker Sam Reid ate nothing but Taco Bell for 30 days, testing the nutritional content of the food in a similar vein to Super Size Me. The stunt gained widespread national attention for both Sam and the fast food chain, including multiple news stations covering his diet and a mention by Jimmy Fallon on The Tonight Show. Reid published a documentary about the challenge on his YouTube channel in October the same year. While the 30-day stunt was not an officially endorsed marketing campaign by Taco Bell, then CEO Mark King later invited Reid to Taco Bell's headquarters in Irvine, California. Reid was also a guest on an official Taco Bell podcast in 2023, discussing the stunt and its effect on his physical health.

In 2023, the company test-marketed a vegan Crunchwrap Supreme in Los Angeles, New York, and Orlando to gauge the potential of a national roll out. Bon Appétit tested a vegan Crunchwrap alongside a non-vegan Crunchwrap purchased at the store in midtown Manhattan and said "the differences between the two were also genuinely difficult to discern."

On August 29, 2025, the company announced that it would be abrogating its artificial intelligence-powered drive-thrus due to technical difficulties and "trolling," including one instance where a customer ordered 18,000 waters. According to reports, the AI would erroneously tell customers that the store was out of all ingredients except for soda and sauce packets. There were also reports of the AI bots simply disallowing customers to modify their orders, such as replacing meat with beans. The phenomenon quickly became an internet meme. One video on TikTok appeared to show a customer attempting to order McDonald's food items from Taco Bell, which was allowed by the system. Dane Mathews, the chain's Chief Digital and Technology Officer, told the Wall Street Journal: "We’re learning a lot, I’m going to be honest with you. [...] I can tell you it's a very active conversation inside Taco Bell in partnership with our franchisees. I think at the end of the day, it's really, really early. And we feel that. And I think other brands feel that, too." Taco Bell stated that it was seeking to address the situation with a "hybrid approach."

=== Dollar Cravings ===
On August 18, 2014, Taco Bell launched a new value menu called Dollar Cravings. Replacing the old Why Pay More menu, Dollar Cravings featured thirteen food items all priced at a United States dollar.

It was renamed "Cravings Value Menu", when prices were increased on some of the items. In April 2019, they introduced a "loaded nacho taco" for a dollar. As of January 2024, the company featured 10 items.

=== Discontinued menu items ===
One of Taco Bell's original 1962 menu items was the Chiliburger, renamed the Bell Burger in 1969, then the Bell Beefer in 1979; this was a loose meat sandwich originally filled with taco-seasoned ground beef in mild red sauce with shredded lettuce and diced onion served on a steamed hamburger bun. Later, shredded cheese and diced tomato were added to the sandwich. Taco Bell discontinued the Bell Beefer around 1986 to maintain a more typical Tex-Mex-inspired menu.

Other discontinued Taco Bell menu items include the Enchirito (name revived for a different menu item); Taco Lite; Taco Grande; Chilito (Chili Cheese Burrito); Beefy Crunch Burrito; Beefy Melt Burrito; Seafood Salad; Chicken Fiesta Burrito; Potatorito; Volcano Taco; BLT Taco; Cheesarito; Cinnamon Crispas; Nacho Crunch Grilled Stuft Burrito; Chicken Caesar Grilled Stuft Burrito; Grilled Stuft Nacho; Fully Loaded Nachos; Crunchwrap Sliders; Blackjack Taco; Bean Burrito Especial; Border Ices; and the Meximelt.

In September 2019, Taco Bell made new changes to its menu. Items discontinued include the Beefy Mini Quesadilla; Chips and Salsa; Chipotle Chicken Loaded Griller; Double Decker Taco; Cool Ranch and Fiery Doritos Locos Tacos; Double Tostada; Power Menu Burrito, and the XXL Grilled Stuft Burrito.

As of August 13, 2020, the menu underwent another update as part of their efforts to streamline processes in their restaurants in response to the COVID-19 pandemic, discontinuing the following items: Grilled Steak Soft Taco; 7-Layer Burrito; Nachos Supreme; Beefy Fritos Burrito; Spicy Tostada; Triple Layer Nachos; Cheesy Fiesta Potatoes; Loaded Grillers, both Cheesy Potato and Beefy Nacho; Chips & Dips; and Mini Skillet Bowl.

== International operations ==
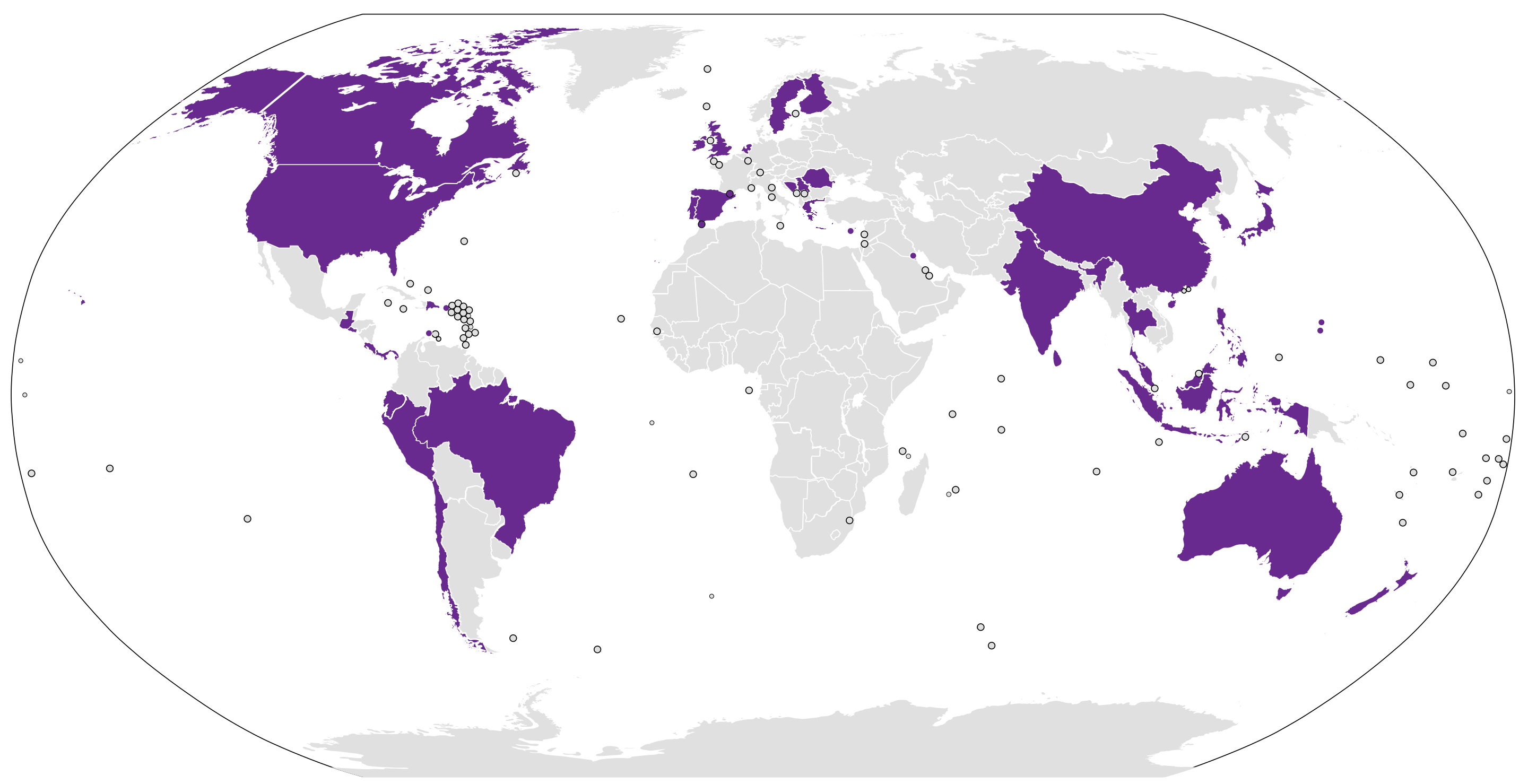
Taco Bell locations

Between 2010 and 2025 the number of outlets grew every year:

Number of Taco Bell restaurants worldwide
2010	2011	2012	2013	2014	2015	2016	2017	2018	2019	2020	2021	2022	2023	2024	2025
5,896	5,945	5,980	6,053	6,206	6,413	6,612	6,849	7,072	7,363	7,427	7,791	8,218	8,564	8,757	9,030

=== Asia ===
==== China ====
In 2003, Taco Bell entered the Chinese market by opening a restaurant in the Shanghai People's Square, named "Taco Bell Grande". Three more TBG restaurants opened before they were closed in 2008. Taco Bell relaunched in the Chinese market when a store opened in Pudong, Shanghai, in late 2016. As of March 2024, Taco Bell has 90 outlets in China.

==== India ====
India's first Taco Bell outlet opened at the Mantri Square mall in Bangalore in 2010. Taco Bell announced an exclusive national master franchise agreement with Burman Hospitality on May 15, 2019. The chain operated 35 outlets across India as on the same date. Yum! Brands stated that it planned to open 600 new Taco Bell outlets in India by 2029.

==== Indonesia ====
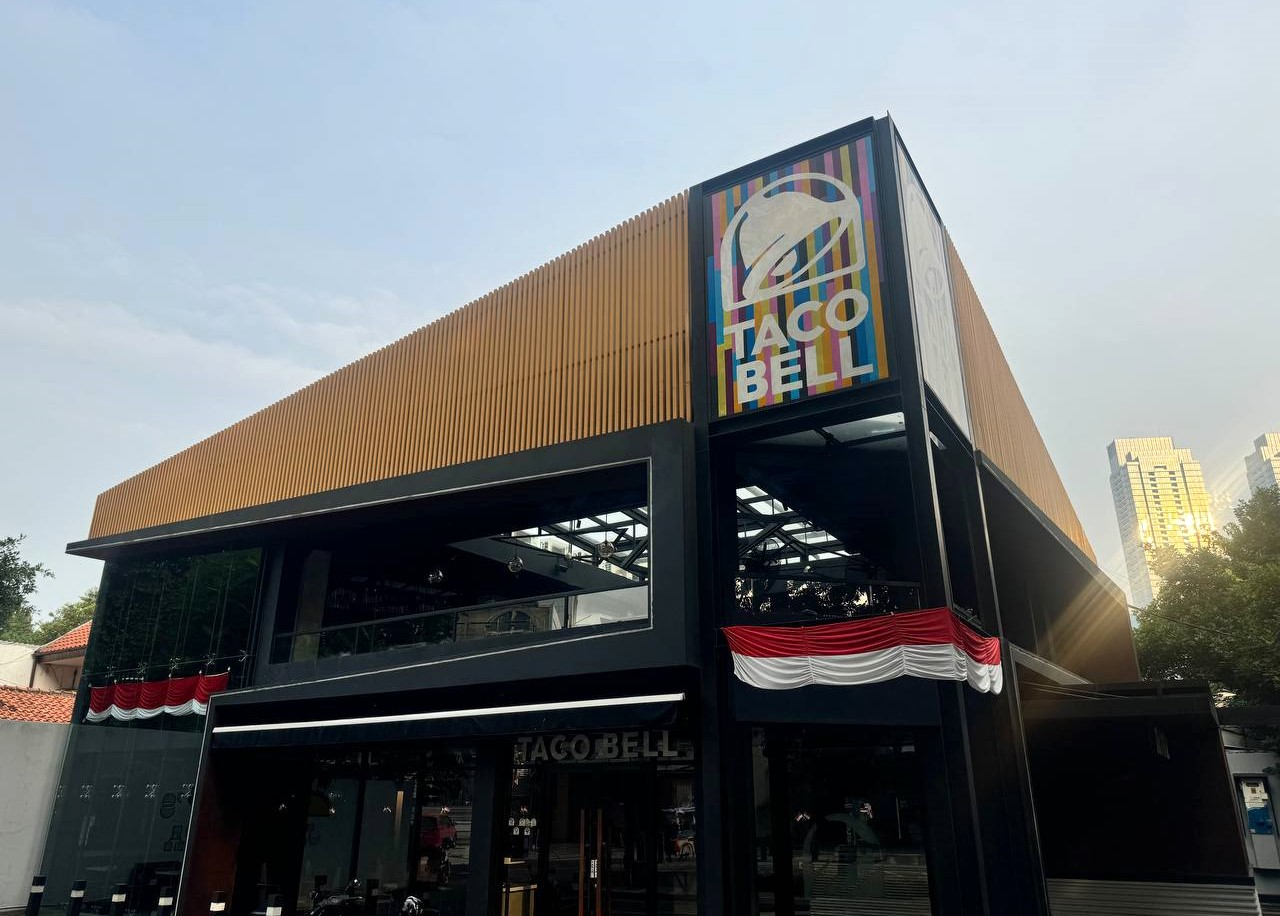
Taco Bell in South Jakarta

Taco Bell opened its first Indonesian restaurant in South Jakarta on December 18, 2020. As of 2022, Taco Bell has since opened three more restaurants in Indonesia, all located in Jakarta.

==== Malaysia ====
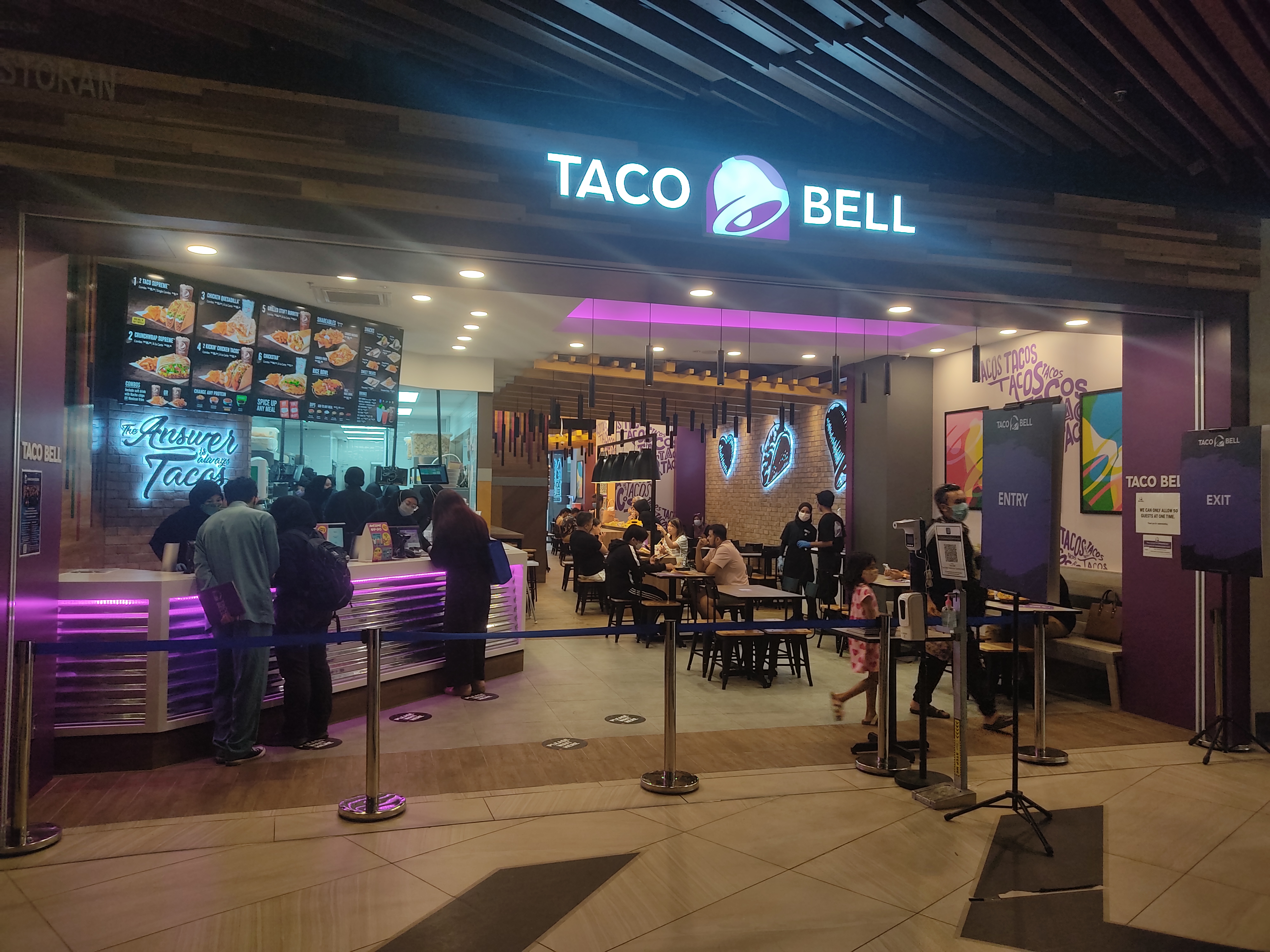
Taco Bell in Tropicana Gardens Mall, Kota Damansara, Malaysia

Taco Bell opened its first Malaysian store in Cyberjaya, Sepang on April 2, 2021. It then opened its second store in Bandar Sri Permaisuri, Kuala Lumpur followed by Tropicana Gardens Mall and Setiawangsa outlets. In early 2022, Taco Bell opened up in Wangsa Maju, Sunway Pyramid, Puchong and has continued in expanding to other states as well. It currently has 13 stores scattered across Klang Valley.

==== Japan ====
Taco Bell once operated shops in Tokyo and Nagoya in the 1980s but withdrew several years later. Since then, there were shops only at United States Forces Japan bases. In 2015, Taco Bell returned to the Japanese market with a new shop in the downtown area of Shibuya, Tokyo. It had "Taco rice" and "Shrimp and avocado burrito" on its original menu.

==== Philippines ====
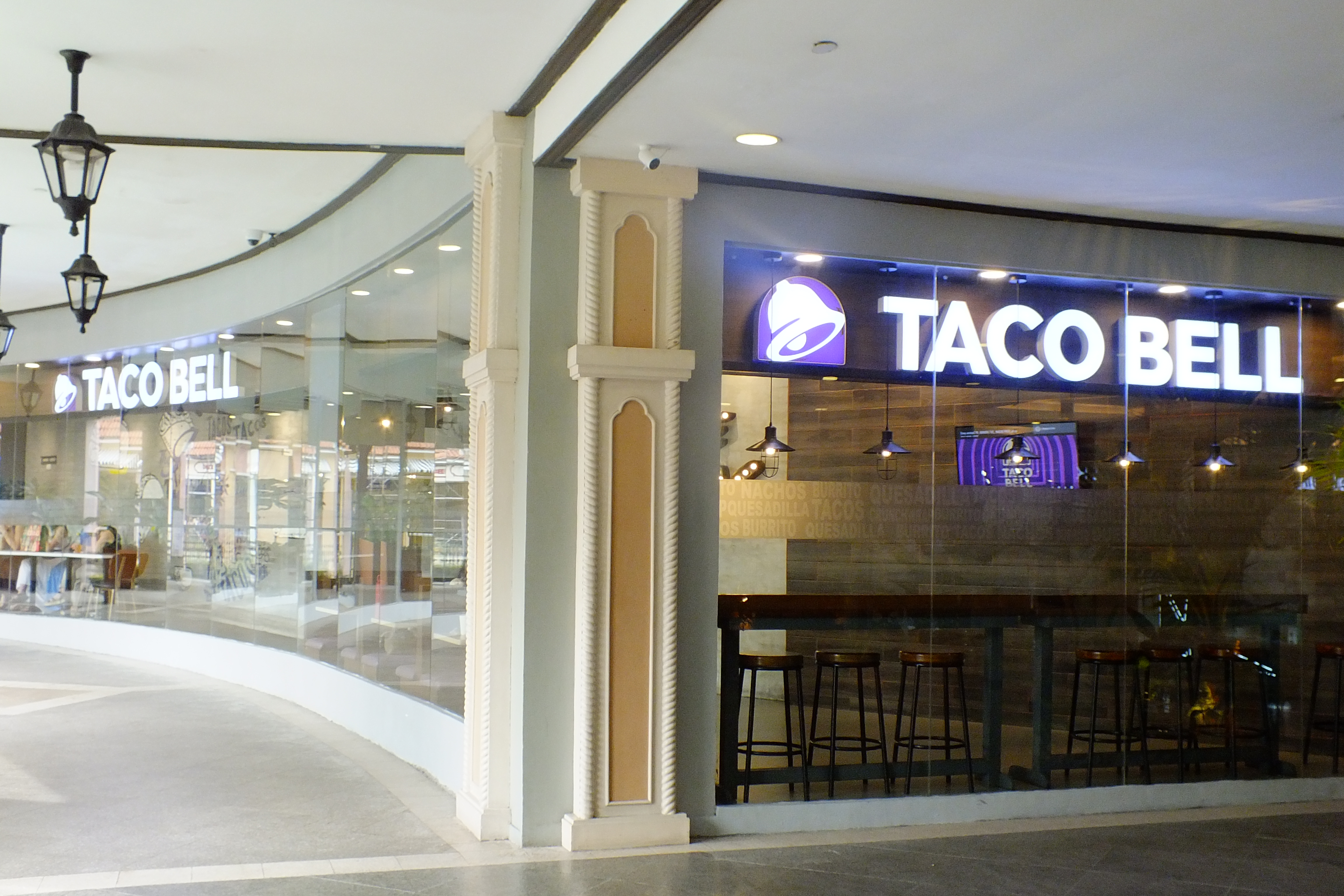
Taco Bell in Venice Grand Canal Mall, Taguig, Philippines

Taco Bell opened its first Philippine branch in October 2004, at the Gateway Mall in Cubao, Quezon City. The Philippine franchisee is PPI Holdings, Inc. As of 2026, there are 12 outlets in the country, all in Metro Manila.

==== Singapore ====
Taco Bell in Singapore existed for a number of years, mostly as combination stores with KFC such as the one that operated at the Funan Digital Life Mall, but in 2008, Taco Bell completely pulled out of Singapore.

==== South Korea ====
There are currently two locations in Seoul, in the Itaewon and Hongdae districts, which attract the most foreigners and college students. The two branches opened in the summer of 2010, Itaewon's branch coming first. A Taco Bell had long been a presence at the U.S. Army's Yongsan Garrison, which is off-limits to non-military personnel, and for a time there was a tongue-in-cheek grassroots campaign by non-Korean, non-military foreigners in Seoul to get another Taco Bell location.

==== Sri Lanka ====
In July 2017, Taco Bell opened an outlet in Colombo, Sri Lanka.

==== Thailand ====
There are at least 38 branches within the country, most of which are situated in Bangkok, Pattaya, and Chiang Mai.

=== Europe ===
==== Bosnia and Herzegovina ====
First Taco Bell opened in Ilidža near Sarajevo on October 17, 2024. As of December 2024, there is another branch located in Sarajevo City Center.

==== Cyprus ====
A Taco Bell opened in Cyprus in December 2009 in Limassol in the MY MALL Limassol. Additionally there are stores in Paphos, Nicosia and Larnaca.

==== Finland ====
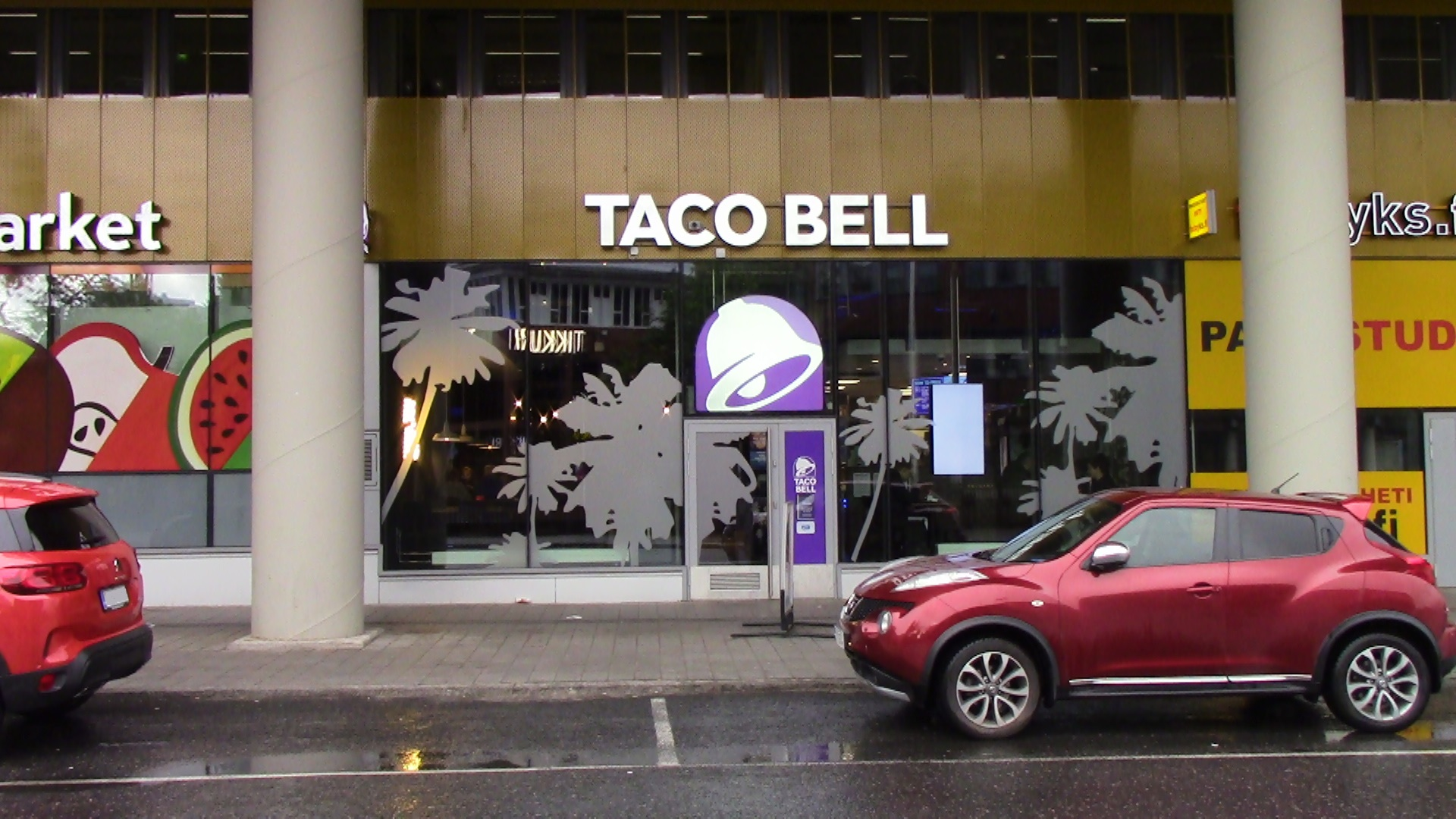
Taco Bell restaurant in Vantaa, Finland

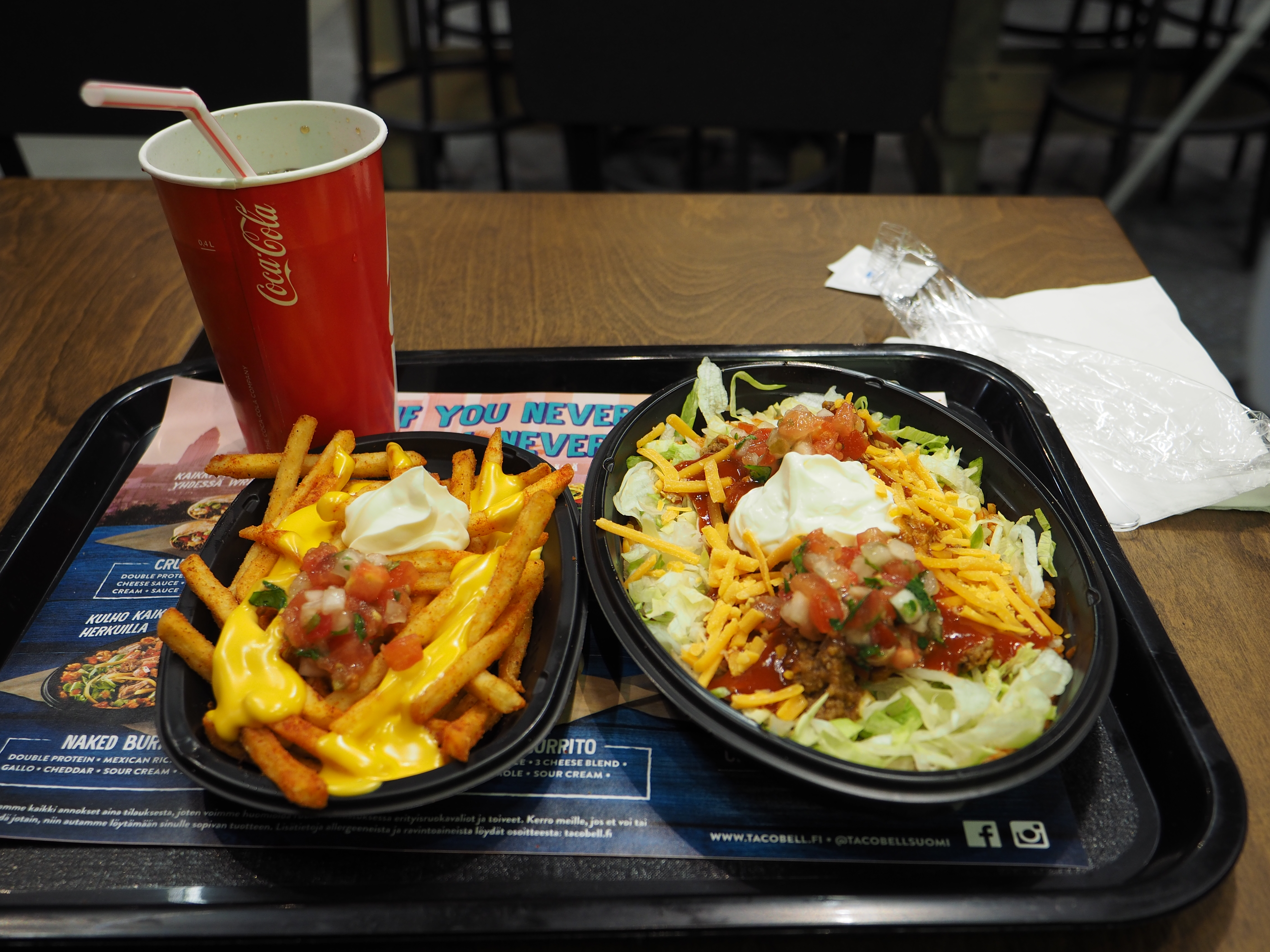
A Naked Burrito Bowl with seasoned French fries and a soft drink at a Taco Bell in Finland

On June 15, 2017, Finnish restaurant company Restel announced that it is bringing Taco Bell to Finland. The first restaurant opened in central Helsinki on November 9, 2017. Restaurants in Sello and Iso Omena malls in Espoo opened later in November 2017. Finland is the first country to include pulled oats (a meat substitute) in the menu. In 2019, the Taco bell expanded outside the Helsinki metropolitan area to Lappeenranta and Turku. In July 2021, a new branch was opened in Oulu. As of November 2022 there are 16 Taco Bell restaurants in Finland, most of them in the Helsinki metropolitan area.

==== Germany ====
Taco Bell planned to open its first German location in Berlin in July or August 2024. Once established, the franchise company İş Holding (ISH) planned to open 100 to 150 Taco Bell restaurants in Germany within the next five years. Initially, the opening of the first locations in Berlin were delayed until the summer of 2025. In early May 2025, the planned opening of Taco Bell in Germany was canceled as Yum! Brands had experienced difficulties with ISH, stemming from how they operated in the German and Turkish markets. The operations of KFC and Pizza Hut Germany remain unaffected after being transferred back directly to Yum!.

In 2026 Lehmann Hotel & Gaststätten Holding GmbH acquired an exclusive licence for the state of Bavaria. Two initial locations, both in Munich, have been announced.

In April 2026, several press releases also stated that Taco Bell will open locations in Cologne, Frankfurt and Stuttgart in the 4th Quarter. On September 4th, 2026, the actual address of the first location in Northrhine-Westphalia was publicized by the local media in Cologne. After a slight delay, the location opened on October 3 in downtown Cologne (Hohenzollernring 50, 50672 Köln). One month later, Pfungstadt was announced as a second location.

==== Gibraltar ====
The first and only Taco Bell store in Gibraltar was opened in 2024.

==== Greece ====
Greece's first Taco Bell opened in Athens upon the grand opening of the newly constructed Athens Metro Mall on November 30, 2010. The restaurant closed in August 2012 and the chain withdrew from the Greek market due to the country's recession.

However, Taco Bell has returned to Greece and the first new location in the country opened on September 3, 2025, in Chalandri, a suburb in North Athens in the Attica region, with more locations to follow.

==== Ireland ====
On May 13, 2025, it was announced that the first Taco Bell restaurant in Ireland would open in the summer of the same year in partnership with Applegreen, with more locations to follow. The first restaurant opened on 16 September 2025 in a new motorway service station off Junction 6 on the M3 in Dunshaughlin, County Meath.

==== Netherlands ====
On April 4, 2017, Taco Bell opened its first restaurant in Eindhoven, Netherlands. On October 12, Taco Bell opened another restaurant in Tilburg. A third restaurant has opened in Breda.

The 10th Taco Bell restaurant in the Netherlands opened in Leidsche Rijn, Utrecht on January 11, 2024. This Taco Bell is also the first Taco Bell restaurant worldwide to use batteries to store energy in case the demanded energy is higher than the power grid is able to handle.

In July 2025, Taco Bell was declared bankrupt in the Netherlands for the second time in seven years, which resulted in the immediate closure of all 10 of its restaurants in the Netherlands. By the following month, however, nine of those locations were set to re-open following their takeover by the franchise operator SYMBRO.

==== Portugal ====
The first Taco Bell store was opened in 2019, with 11 restaurants spread across the country in 2021.

==== Romania ====
The first Taco Bell store opened in Romania's capital, Bucharest, on October 12, 2017, and by the end of 2024, it had expanded to 16 locations nationwide.

==== Serbia ====
Taco Bell opened its first store in Serbia, in the capital city of Belgrade, on November 20, 2025, at the Ušće Shopping Center. Serbia is the second country of the former Yugoslavia in which Taco Bell is present. Second opened in Novi Sad.

==== Spain ====
Spain is the most important market for Taco Bell in Europe. The outlets are in various towns on the mainland, on Mallorca and on the Canary Islands. There are 119 Taco Bell branches by early 2024, more than twice than in 2017 when Taco Bell had 32 branches in Spain. The first Taco Bell in Spain was opened at Naval Station Rota in 2004 and is available only to those authorized to access the naval base. The first Taco Bell for the public was opened in the Islazul Shopping Mall, Madrid, in December 2008. Yum! Brands announced that it would open additional restaurants in Spain in early 2009 as part of a test trial for the European market. The second location of Taco Bell in Spain was opened at the La Vaguada Shopping Mall, Madrid in March 2010.

==== Sweden ====
The first Taco Bell store in Sweden was opened on November 27, 2025, marking the second Nordic country to receive a Taco Bell.

==== United Kingdom ====
The United Kingdom was the first European country with a Taco Bell. In 1986, a location was opened in London on Coventry Street (between Leicester Square and Piccadilly Circus) followed by a second location in Earl's Court near the Earl's Court tube station. One other store opened in Uxbridge but all closed in the mid-1990s. In 1994, the university food provider Compass announced plans for outlets on its university and college sites. However, only one store was opened at Birmingham University, which is now closed.

After the Birmingham University branch closed, there were only two Taco Bell branches in the UK, at the Strategic Air Command and United States Air Force bases at RAF Mildenhall and RAF Lakenheath. Access is restricted to relevant service personnel.

In the late 2000s, Yum! Brands announced that it was reopening Taco Bell locations in the United Kingdom as part of a large, planned expansion into Europe. Yum! took advantage of the recent great recession which led to increasing sales at other fast food outlets; it also said that there was now a greater awareness of Mexican food in the UK and that it can be successful with improved menu offerings and marketing. The first new store opened at the Lakeside Shopping Centre in Essex on June 28, 2010. Another store opened in Basildon, Essex, on November 29, 2010, and a third in the Manchester Arndale Food Court on November 7, 2011.

On March 1, 2013, it was announced that trace amounts of horse meat from a European supplier had been found in various food products, including Taco Bell's beef in the UK. By August 2017, there were 17 Taco Bell branches in the United Kingdom, all of which were in England and outside of London. The first Scottish branch was opened in Glasgow in December 2017. As of June 2019 there are 39 branches in Scotland and England, including three in London. Beginning in October 2019, Taco Bell locations in the UK began serving Doritos Locos Tacos.

On March 2, 2020, the first Welsh Taco Bell branch was opened in Cardiff.

More recently, in November 2021, Taco Bell opened its 77th UK store, and a return to the British Midlands with a store in The Royal Town of Sutton Coldfield, Birmingham.

In August 2022 a Taco Bell was opened in Torquay, Devon, the second in the county after Plymouth. As of 2024 there are now more than 130 locations in the UK.

=== Middle East ===
A Taco Bell opened in the United Arab Emirates in November 2008 in Dubai at the Dubai Mall. A fourth UAE location was also planned for Bawadi Mall in the city of Al Ain. The locations at Dubai Mall, Deira City Centre, and Mirdif City Centre have all closed and Taco Bell has completely pulled out of the Emirati market. Taco Bell is still open in Kuwait and has not been pulled out ever since from the Kuwaiti market, as the chain is franchised in this region by Kout Food Group.

=== North America ===
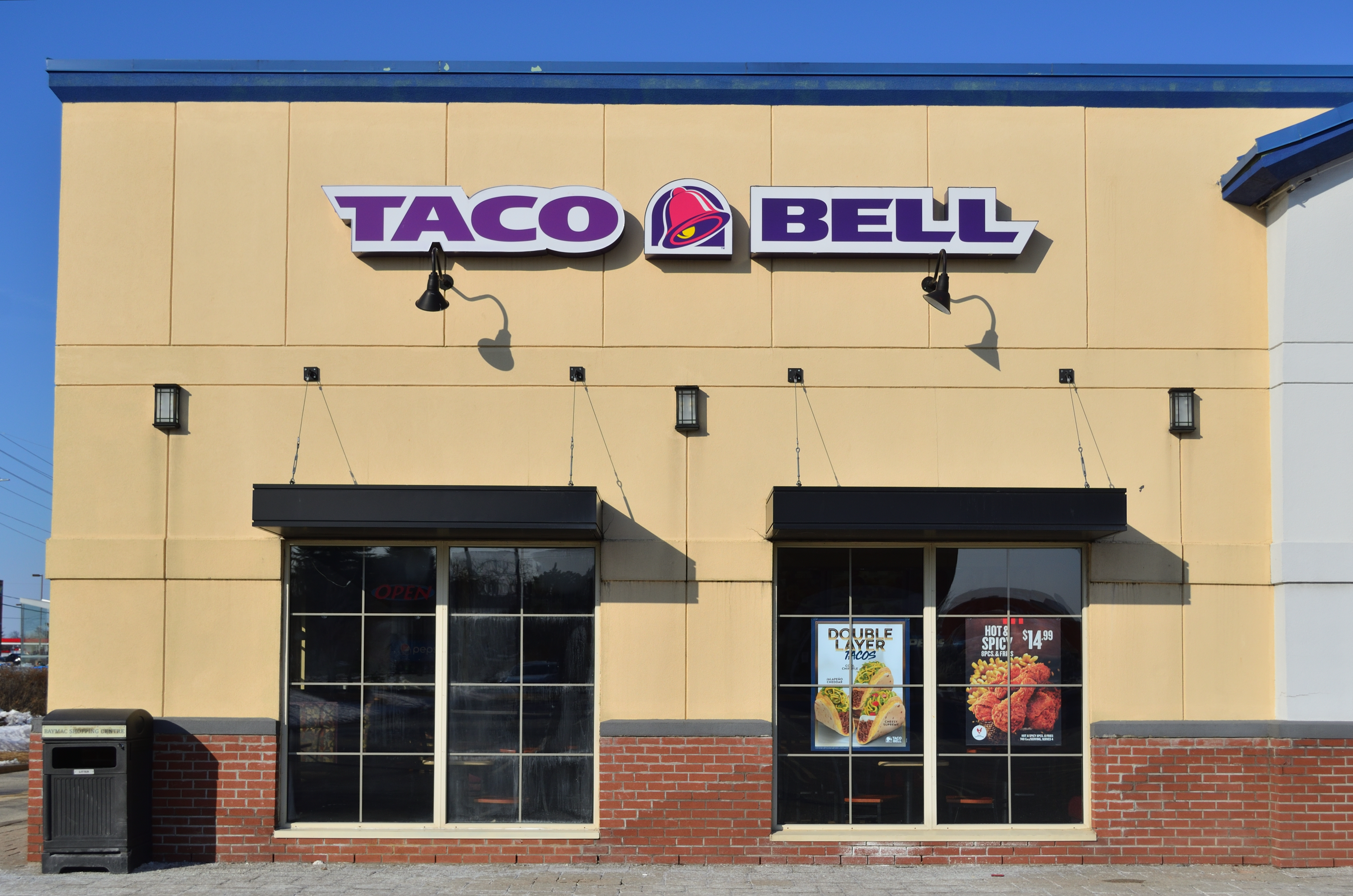
Taco Bell in Canada

==== Canada ====
Taco Bell has been present in Canada since 1979, with the first store opening in Windsor, Ontario. There are currently Taco Bell locations in 8 of the 10 Canadian provinces: British Columbia, Alberta, Saskatchewan, Manitoba, Ontario, New Brunswick and Nova Scotia, Newfoundland and Labrador. Taco Bell had operated in the province of Quebec for close to 15 years, however announced its withdrawal on January 6, 2022. For some time it was possible to order draft beer with one's order. Taco Bell offers free soda refills in its stores.

On March 31, 2011, Priszm, who was the largest franchisee for Taco Bell locations in Canada, went into bankruptcy protection in Ontario and British Columbia. On May 6, 2011, Priszm Income Fund was delisted from the Toronto Stock Exchange for failure to meet the continued listing requirements. Since then, some Taco Bell restaurants have been closed down including those in Guelph, Hamilton, and Cambridge, Ontario, among others.

==== Puerto Rico ====
In November 2026, Yum! Brands temporarily closed all Taco Bell locations in Puerto Rico as the operator, Encanto Restaurants, filed for Chapter 11 bankruptcy protection.

=== Oceania ===
==== Australia ====
Taco Bell first opened in Australia in September 1981, but Taco Bell was ordered to change its name after the owner of a local restaurant successfully sued Taco Bell for misleading conduct. The local restaurant was called "Taco Bell's Casa" and had been operating in Australia since the 1970s. The owner successfully argued that Sydneysiders would confuse the takeaway chain with his restaurant, and this would damage his reputation. Taco Bell later opened in 1997 in Australia with a store in the cinema district on George Street, Sydney and a year later in 1998 within a few KFC stores in the state of New South Wales, but by 2005, the Taco Bell brand was pulled out of the country.

On September 13, 2017, Collins Foods announced that Taco Bell would return to the Australian market, with their first store being situated in the Brisbane suburb of Annerley in Queensland using a refurbished Sizzler restaurant which had closed earlier that year. The Annerley store opened on November 4, 2017. In 2018, Collins Foods signed a development deal with Yum! Brands to open over 50 Taco Bell restaurants across Australia between January 2019 and December 2021. A legal dispute with Victoria-based restaurant chain Taco Bill was resolved in February 2020.

As of February 2024, there are 39 Taco Bell restaurants across Australia; 12 in New South Wales, 13 in Queensland, nine in Victoria, and four in Western Australia. There are also plans to open restaurants in other locations, such as Canberra, the Central Coast, Port Macquarie and Toowoomba. While the chain has grown nationwide, both of its two outlets in North Queensland closed in November 2022, which were previously locations in Cairns and Townsville. In April 2025, Taco Bell owner Collins Foods announced to exit the Australian operations, with the prospect of finding a buyer in 12 months or else winding up the business.

In March 2026, just weeks from the deadline, Collins Foods successfully transferred the operations to Restaurant Brands, another partner in the area. 6 stores will close in Queensland and 1 in Victoria, leaving 20 in the deal but saving the company from demise and a more exorbitant closure.

==== New Zealand ====
Taco Bell officially opened its first New Zealand location on November 12, 2019, in the suburb of New Lynn, Auckland.

As of January 2023, there are 14 Taco Bell restaurants across New Zealand; 10 on the North Island and four on the South Island. By city, there are seven in Auckland, three in Christchurch and one each in Dunedin, Rotorua, Taupiri and Wellington. There are two outlets at airports in New Zealand, one at Auckland Airport and the other at Christchurch Airport.

==== Territories of the United States ====
Taco Bell operates several stores in Guam.

Taco Bell operates one restaurant in the Northern Mariana Islands, located on the island of Saipan.

In 2005 Taco Bell started the permitting process to set up a restaurant in American Samoa in Pago Pago.

Taco Bell also operates stores in Puerto Rico.

=== South America ===
There are outlets in Brazil in the São Paulo area, Campinas, Rio de Janeiro and Brasília.

Taco Bell has stores in Chile, which many of them are operated in conjunction (and in the same facilities) with Pizza Hut. All Taco Bell stores are in shopping malls located mainly in Santiago.

Peru has branches in Lima.

There were four outlets in the Bogotá area in Colombia, but these closed in late 2018.

Taco Bell operated in Ecuador between 1993 and 2009, it returned to operate on October 7, 2025, in Quito.

=== Other countries ===
Taco Bell is present in the Dominican Republic, Aruba, Costa Rica, Panama and Portugal.

=== Former operations ===
==== Iceland ====
Taco Bell in Iceland was operated as a part of the KFC establishment in Hafnarfjörður, suburb of Reykjavík. It was established in late 2006, after the departure of the U.S. Navy from Naval Air Station Keflavik. A second location opened in the Ártúnshöfði part of Reykjavík in November 2008. Taco Bell closed its Hafnarfjörður location in late 2023.

==== Mexico ====
Taco Bell has attempted to enter the Mexican market twice. After a highly publicised launch in Mexico City in 1992, all the restaurants were closed two years later. In September 2007, Taco Bell returned to Monterrey, projecting an American image with an Americanized menu that included french fries, but it closed in January 2010 due to low patronage.

==== Poland ====
The first Polish Taco Bell store was opened in 1993. Following an aggressive campaign of expansion, Taco Bell's efforts soon withered, and the chain withdrew from Poland shortly thereafter. In 2026, AmRest announced, that Taco Bell will return to the Polish market. The first new Taco Bell restaurant is expected to open in the fourth quarter of 2026, with additional locations to follow over time.

==== Russia ====
In the early 1990s, PepsiCo opened several Taco Bell locations inside the Moscow Metro on, for example, Park Kultury and Komsomolskaya stations. This experiment lasted only a few years. These locations live on under different ownership and a different name.

=== Military bases ===
The AAFES provides Taco Bell for military bases in Bahrain, El Salvador, Germany, Guatemala, Iraq Italy, and Kosovo.

== Animal welfare ==
Taco Bell is subject to the animal welfare standards of its parent company, Yum! Brands.

In 2016, Taco Bell stopped sourcing eggs from egg-laying hens raised in battery cages in their US restaurants.

In 2024, Taco Bell announced that it would publish benchmarks on moving away from gestation crates in pork production by the end of 2024. However, no such benchmarks were published that year.

== Clothing line ==
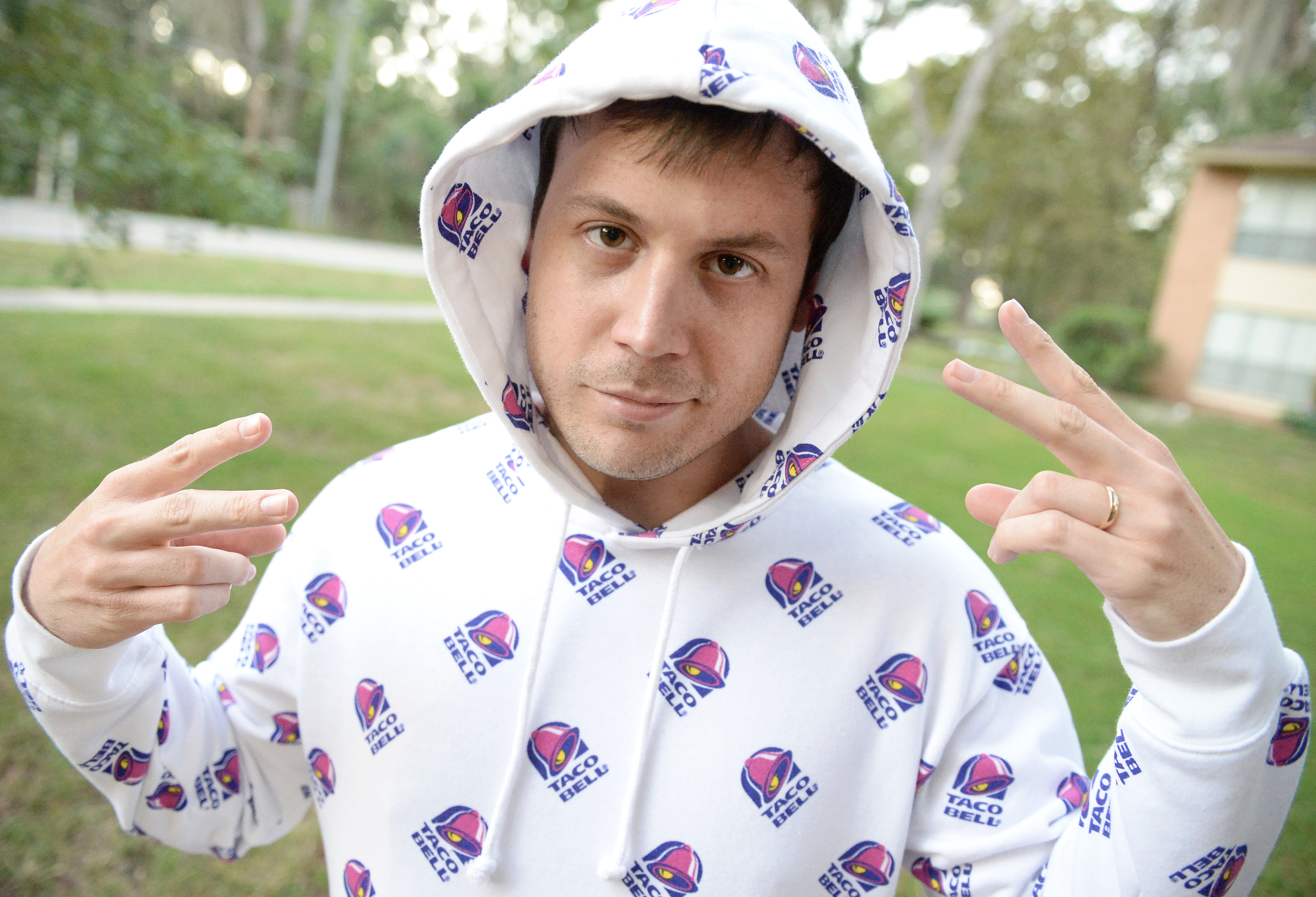
Man wearing a white Taco Bell hooded sweatshirt, part of the 2017 Forever 21 Taco Bell collection

In 2017, Forever 21 produced a clothing line in partnership with Taco Bell, featuring branded T-shirts and sweatshirts, as well as bodysuits made to look like Border Sauce packets.

In November 2019, Taco Bell announced Taco Bell's Taco Shop, an online store with Taco Bell branded merchandise including hoodies and tees, holiday ornaments, inflatable sauce packets, and wedding-related items.

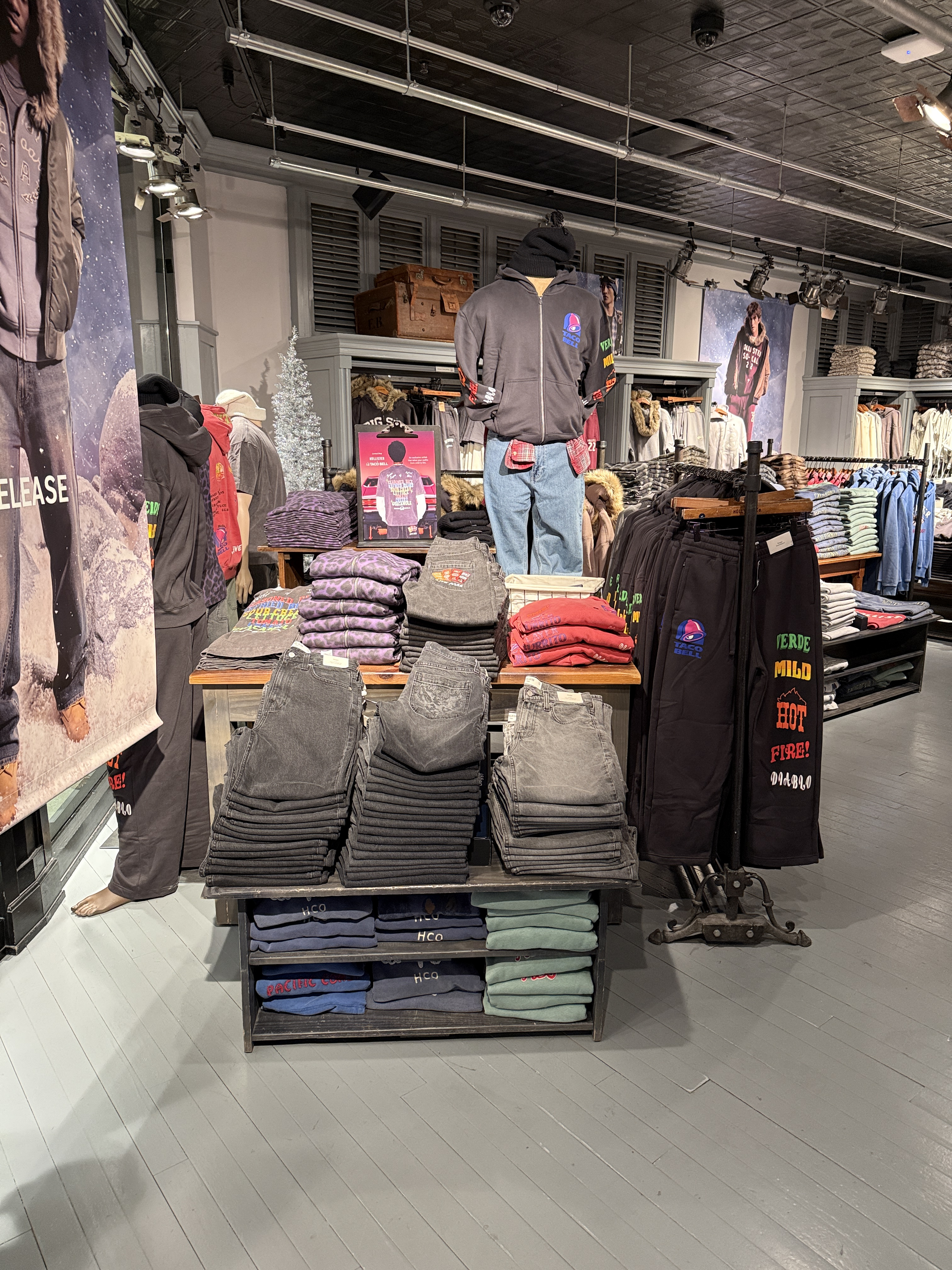
Hollister × Taco Bell clothing line displayed for sale at a Hollister Co. store location in Orlando, Florida.

In late 2025, Hollister Co. partnered with Taco Bell for a limited-edition, Y2K-inspired capsule collection. The drop, the first Hollister × Taco Bell collaboration, includes 11 pieces: vintage-style graphic tees, baggy denim, soft “Feel Good Fleece” hoodies and sweatpants, cozy socks, and a hot-sauce packet keychain accessory. The collection officially launched in Hollister stores and online on December 1, 2025, with prices ranging from US $14.95 to US $79.95, and sizes offered from XS to XL.

== See also ==
- Priszm
- Taco Bell chihuahua
- Enchirito
- Crunchwrap Supreme
- Taco Bell Quarterly
