= Enchirito =

Taco Bell menu item

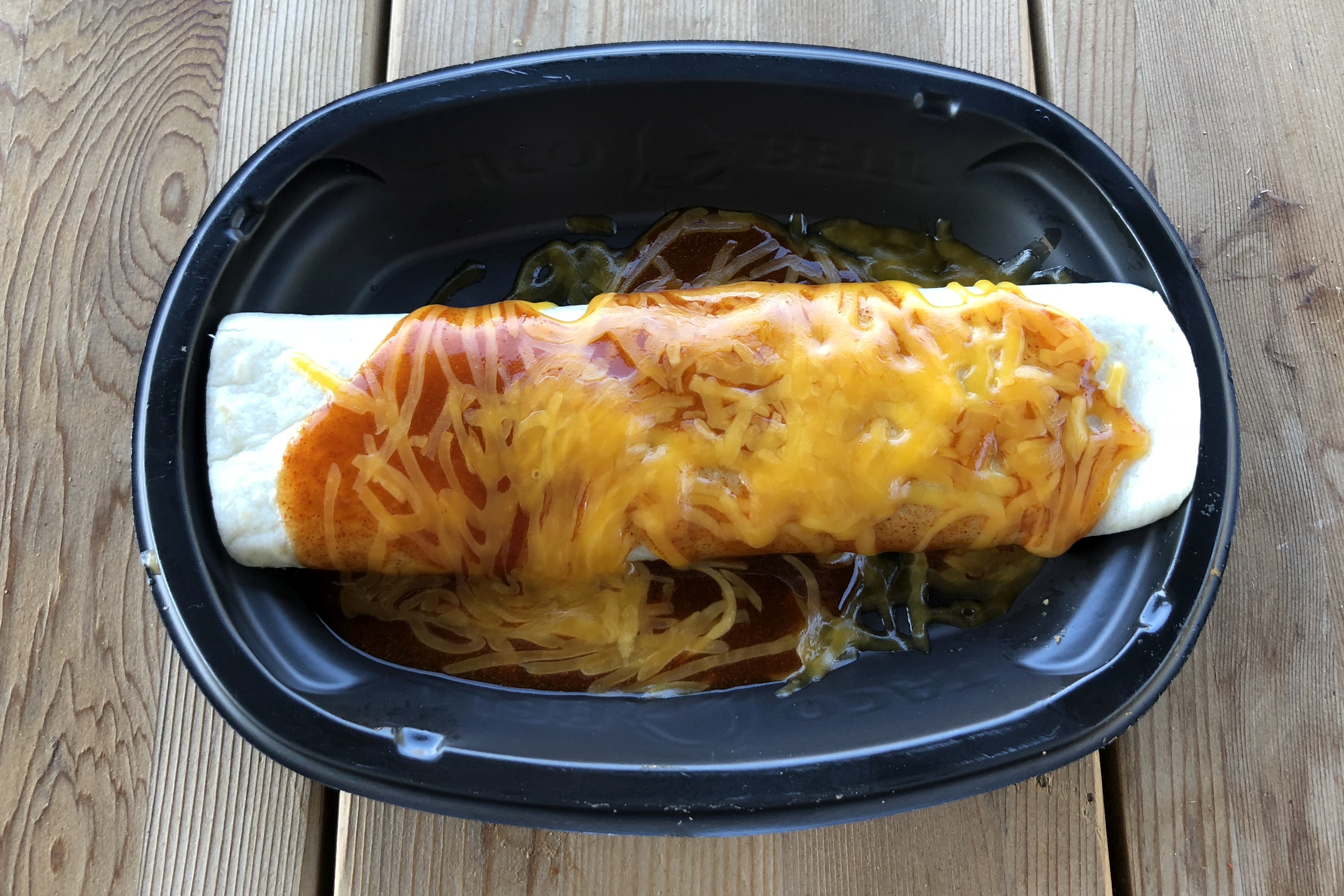
An Enchirito in 2018.

Enchirito (Spanish pronunciation: [entʃiˈɾito]), a portmanteau of the Mexican dishes enchilada and burrito, is a trademarked menu item of the restaurant chain Taco Bell. It is composed of a flour tortilla filled with seasoned ground beef taco meat (with options to substitute for steak, chicken or remove meat), beans, diced onions, cheddar cheese, and "red sauce".

== History ==
Taco Bell's original Enchirito of the 1970s was advertised as a special tortilla filled with ground beef, pinto beans, and diced onions; topped with red sauce, shredded cheddar cheese and three black olive slices. It was served in a reheatable aluminum foil tray. One of the earliest print references to the Enchirito is an August 1967 Taco Bell ad in an Amarillo, Texas, newspaper for a meal consisting of a taco, Enchirito, and soft drink for $0.89.

Taco Bell registered the name with the United States Patent and Trademark Office as a service mark in May 1970. In its application, Taco Bell described the item as a [ Combination Enchilada And Burrito Prepared As Part Of ] Restaurant Services and that "Enchirito" Is Merely A Fanciful Combination Of "Enchilada" And "Burrito."

== Name ==
The coining of the name Enchirito (a portmanteau of the words enchilada and burrito) for this item was a peculiar action by Taco Bell. It was the only item on the menu, at the time, to not use the common Mexican food nomenclature for that item. Whereas a burrito is typically a flour tortilla filled with beans, and an enchilada is typically a corn tortilla filled with meat and smothered in chile sauce, the name Enchirito communicates the combination of these elements. On the other hand, it appears the unusual name was not to help Americans unfamiliar with the Spanish names of the food items; indeed, for many years Taco Bell menu boards featured a system of phonetic pronunciation guides next to each item.

== Reappearance ==
Although Taco Bell officially discontinued the Enchirito in 1993, some customers still ordered them, and word spread through the Internet that many restaurants would still prepare them with the ingredients they had available. Due to this underground popularity, the Enchirito returned to Taco Bell's menu, and television commercials, featuring the Taco Bell chihuahua promoting the Enchirito, were first broadcast on December 26, 1999, with later commercials in mid-2000 featuring the rapping or singing styles of the "five guys with no talent". However, some things about the Enchirito had changed; the original aluminum serving container had been replaced with a coated pressed-paper oblong bowl when dining in, or a black plastic bowl with a clear plastic lid if ordering from the drive-thru. Most significantly, the character of the Enchirito was altered by changing the yellow corn masa tortilla to a white wheat flour tortilla and the olive slices were omitted. The chicken Enchirito and the steak Enchirito, which respectively substituted chicken or steak for the ground beef, were also introduced as options. The Enchirito is served with a plastic spork. The Enchirito was once again discontinued when Taco Bell introduced the Smothered Burrito on July 25, 2013, but was reintroduced for a limited time on May 25, 2023. As of June 2026, the Enchirito is again available for a limited time.

A typical ground beef Enchirito contains 209 calories, 17 grams of fat (8 grams saturated), 45 milligrams cholesterol, and 1110 milligrams of sodium.
