= Korean-Mexican fusion =

Type of fusion cuisine

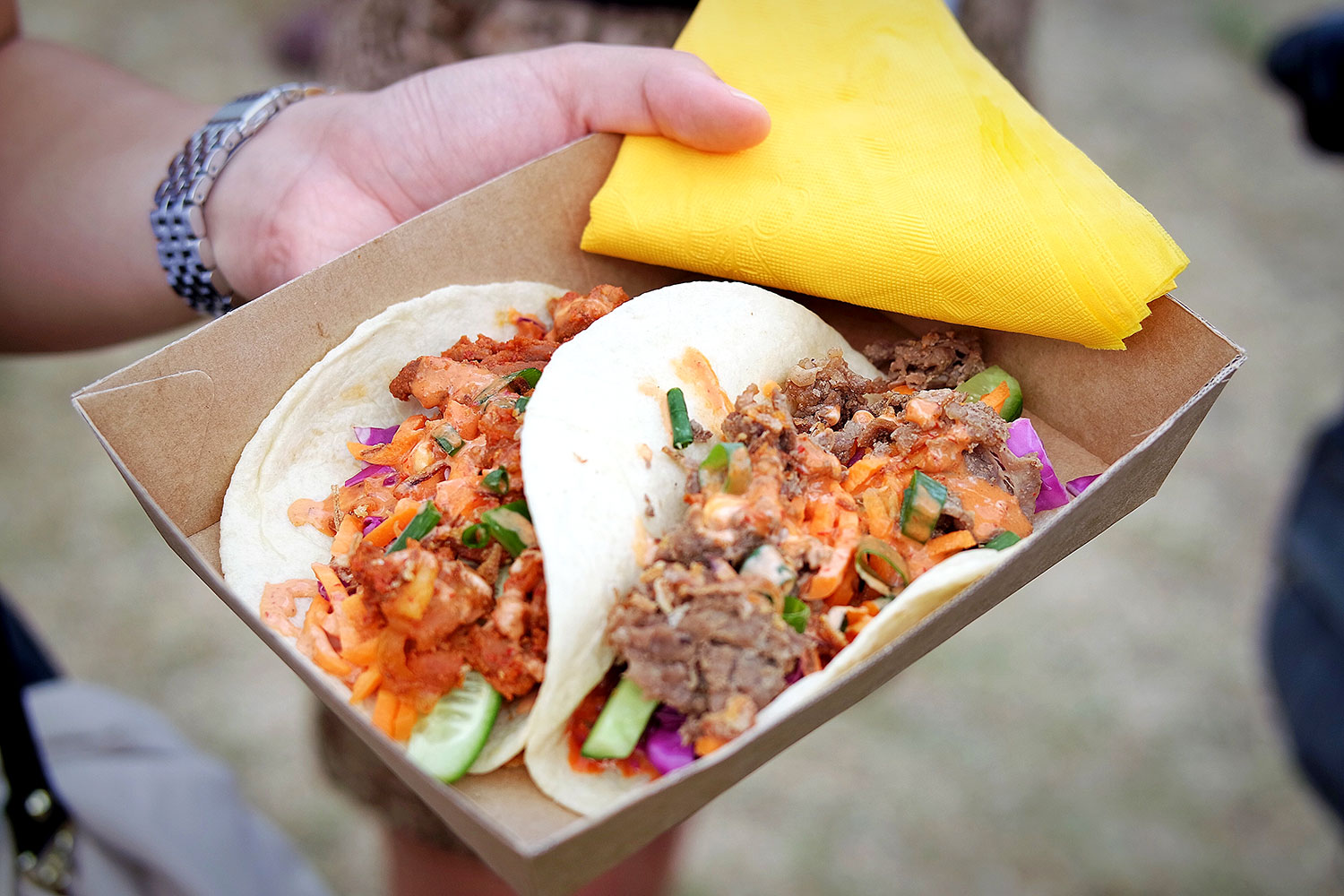
Korean tacos, a fusion dish combining Korean cuisine flavors with the traditional Mexican taco.

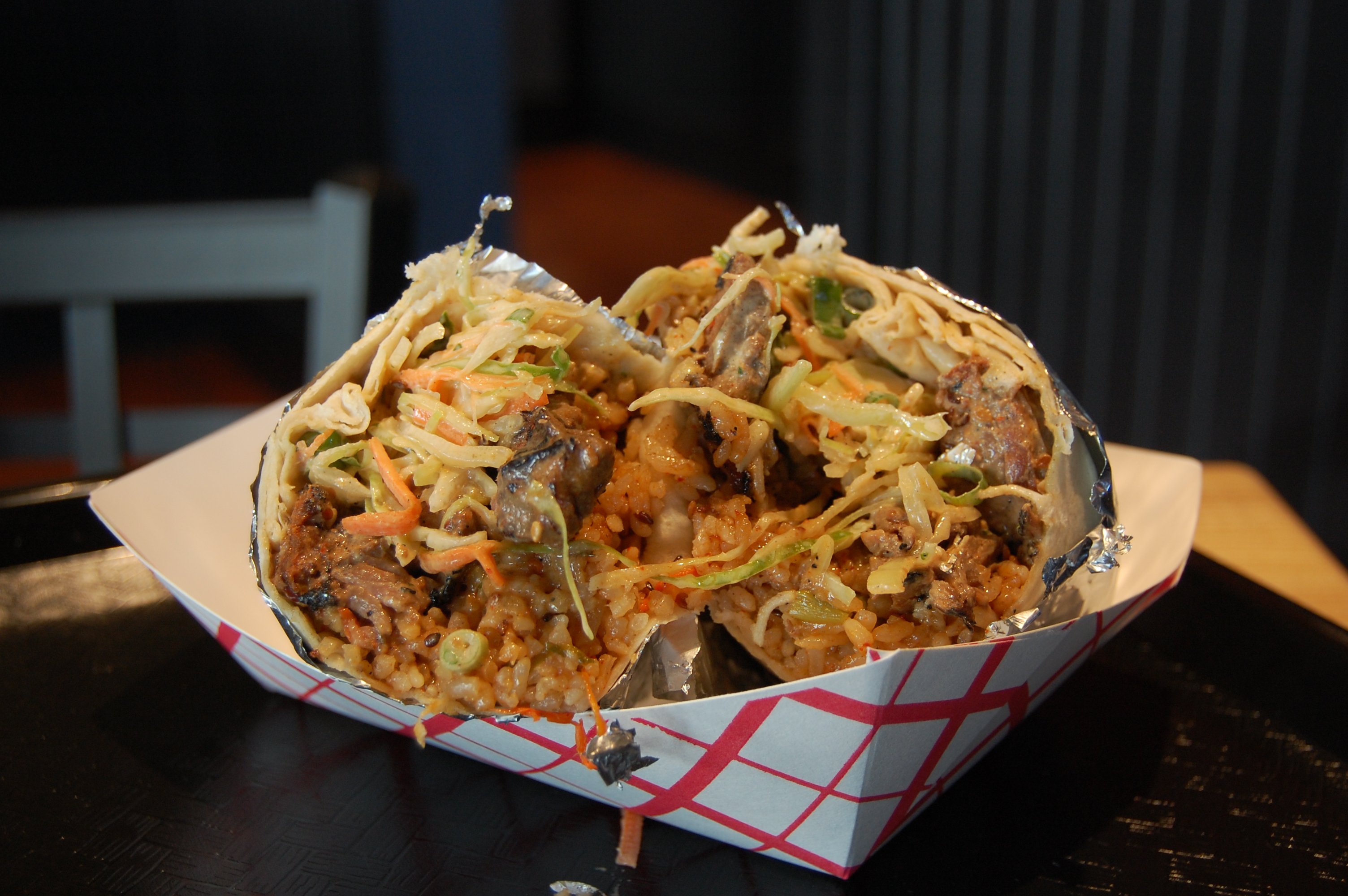
Korean burrito, a fusion dish combining elements of Korean cuisine and Mexican-style burritos.

Korean–Mexican fusion is a type of fusion cuisine originally from Los Angeles that combines traditional elements of American-style Mexican and Korean foods. The earliest Korean-Mexican fusion featured Mexican or Tex-Mex dishes such as tacos or burritos filled with Korean-style barbecued meats and kimchi. Typical dishes include Korean tacos and bulgogi burritos. Food critics Jane and Michael Stern state that Korean–Mexican fusion is a growing food trend that has steadily gained popularity since 2009.

Restaurants serving Korean tacos have existed in the United States at least since 1996, with a restaurant in Santa Monica, California called "2424 Pico" using the name for Korean fillings inside of a lettuce wrap. The proprietors of the Kogi Korean BBQ, a food truck in Los Angeles, California, used Twitter to announce their schedule and itinerary. In the following years, food trucks serving Korean–Mexican fusion opened in several cities across the U.S., including San Francisco, Austin, Chicago, Portland, Seattle and Washington. after the first food truck serving Korean tacos, Kogi Korean BBQ, opened in Los Angeles in late 2008.

Several restaurants serving Korean–Mexican fusion exist in Seoul, South Korea and Beijing, China. Unlike in the United States, Korean-Mexican fusion exists in the casual dining segment, while street food trucks continue to dominate in the US.

Typical dishes include tacos or burritos prepared with Korean barbecue, such as kalbi or spicy chicken, and American foods such as french fries with kimchi.

== See also ==
- Chi'Lantro BBQ
- Kogi Korean BBQ
- Korean taco
