= List of food trucks =

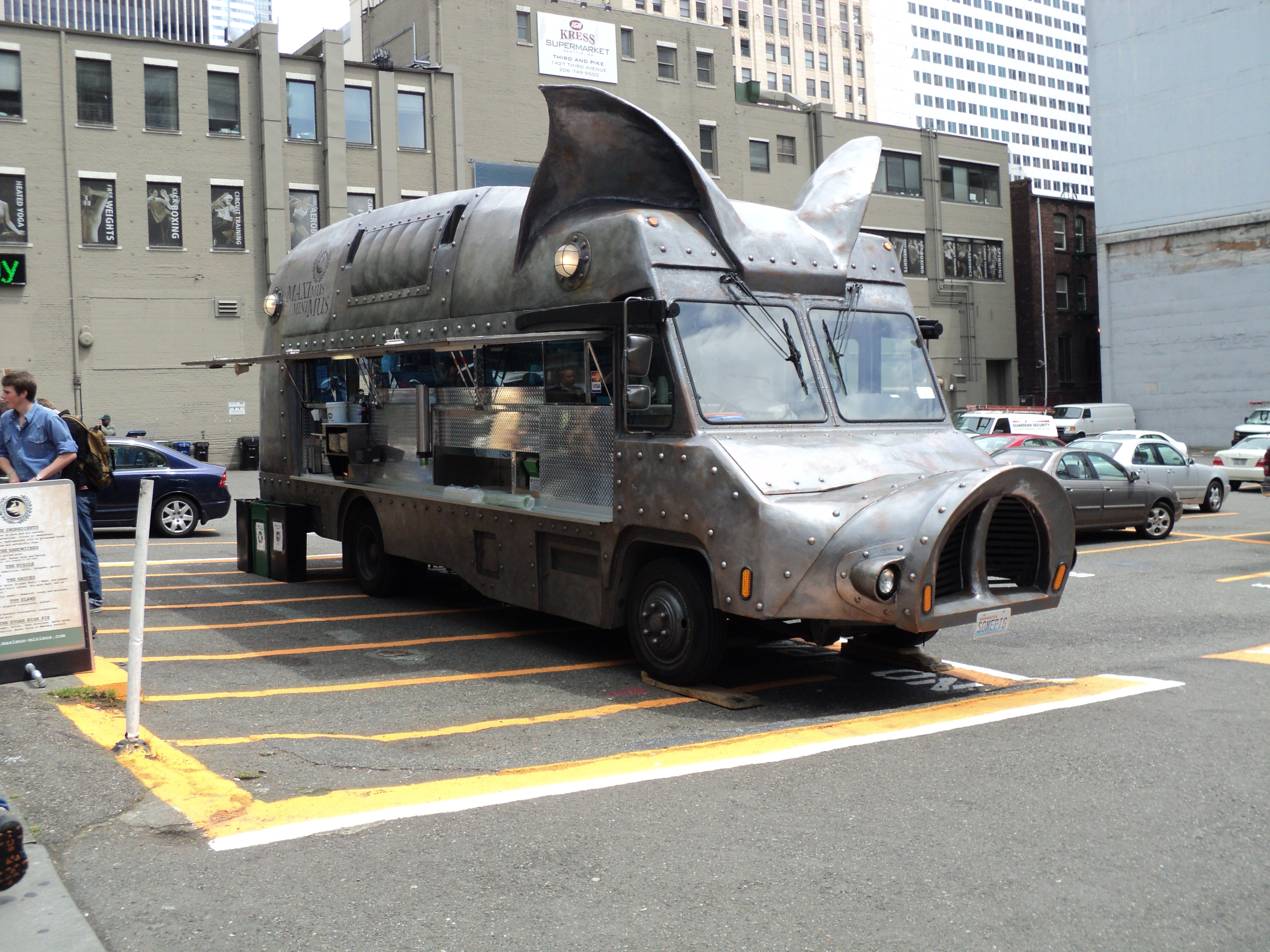
The Maximus/Minimus food truck, at the corner of Pike Street and 2nd Avenue in downtown Seattle, Washington

A food truck is a mobile venue that transports and sells food. Some, including ice cream trucks, sell frozen or prepackaged food; others resemble restaurants on wheels. Some may cater to specific meals, such as the breakfast truck, lunch truck or lunch wagon, snack truck, kebab trailer, break truck, or taco truck. This list includes notable food trucks companies, and is not a comprehensive list of all food trucks companies.

== Notable food trucks ==
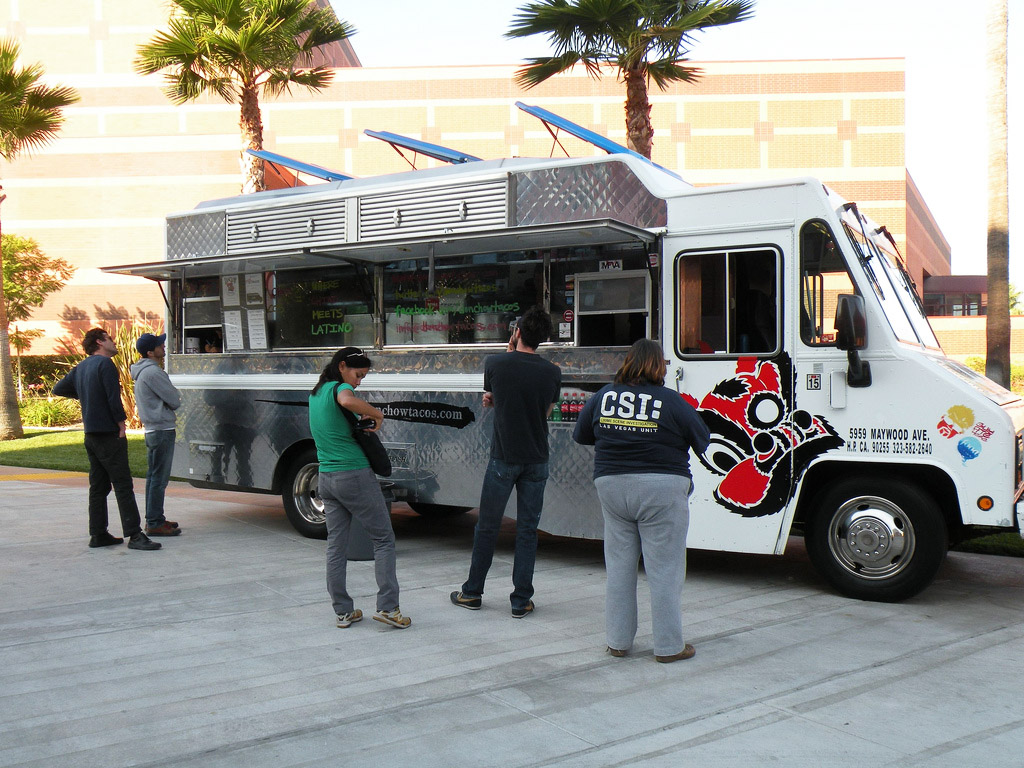
Don Chow Tacos food truck

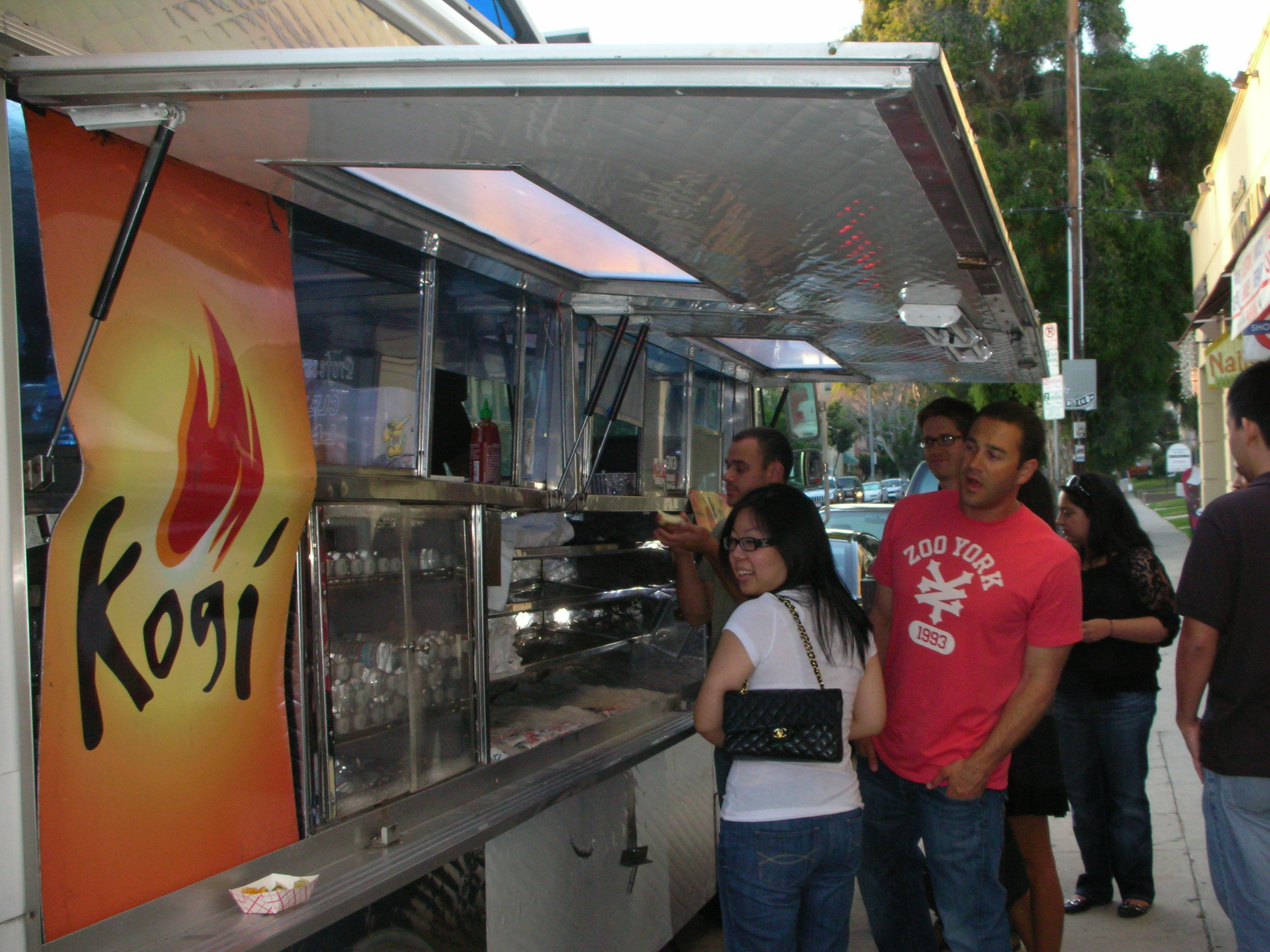
A Kogi Korean BBQ food truck

- Big Gay Ice Cream Truck – New York City
- Bud the Spud - Halifax, Nova Scotia, Canada
- Burger Theory - Adelaide, South Australia
- Chef Jeremiah – Miami, Florida
- Chi'Lantro BBQ – Texas (Austin, Fort Hood, Houston)
- Clover Food Lab – Boston, Massachusetts
- Coolhaus – Southern California, New York City, and Dallas
- Ditch Witch - Montauk, New York
- Don Chow Tacos – Los Angeles, California
- Grease Trucks – Rutgers University in New Brunswick, New Jersey.
- The Grilled Cheese Truck – southwest United States
- Habit Burger & Grill – as of November 2017, has a fleet of nine food trucks
- The Halal Guys – New York City
- Holy Trinity Barbecue – Portland, Oregon
- Jojo – Portland, Oregon
- Kelvin Natural Slush Co. – New York, New York
- Kim Jong Grillin' – Portland, Oregon
- KIND Movement – tours the United States
- Kogi Korean BBQ – Los Angeles, California
- Korilla BBQ – New York City
- Maximus/Minimus – Seattle, Washington
- Off the Rez, Seattle
- Pincho Man – Miami, Florida
- Pølsevogn - Literally meaning "sausage wagon", these food trucks are endemic to Denmark and are a staple in most towns.
- Rancho Bravo Tacos
- Seoul Sausage
- Salt – Dubai, United Arab Emirates
- Taco Bus – Tampa, Florida
- Veracruz All Natural
- Yardy Rum Bar

=== Organizations ===
- Food Truck League
- City Flavor
- Off the Grid
- Roaming Hunger
- New York Food Truck Association
- Philadelphia Mobile Food Association
- Taco Trucks at Every Mosque - United States initiative to bring together Muslim and Latino communities

=== Styles ===
- Ice cream van
- Pølsevogn / sausage wagon

== See also ==
- Dickie Dee – a fleet of Canadian ice cream vending carts
- Field kitchen
- Food cart
- "Food Truckin'"
- Food truck rally
- Hot dog cart
- Hot dog stand
- Mobile catering
- Street food
  - List of street foods
- The Great Food Truck Race
  - List of The Great Food Truck Race episodes
