= The Grilled Cheese Truck =

American food truck company

- The Grilled Cheese Truck's logo
- Type: Food truck company specializing in grilled cheese sandwiches
- Industry: Fast food
- Founded: Los Angeles, 2009
- Founder: Dave Danhi and Michele Grant
- Successor: TRIG Acquisition 1, Inc.
- Area served: Southern California, Los Angeles, Phoenix, San Antonio, and Austin
- Key people: Dave Danhi
- Website: thegrilledcheesetruck.com

The Grilled Cheese Truck is a food truck company serving gourmet "chef driven" grilled cheese sandwiches. The company started in Los Angeles in 2009, and has since expanded throughout Southern California, Phoenix, San Antonio and Austin.

== Overview ==
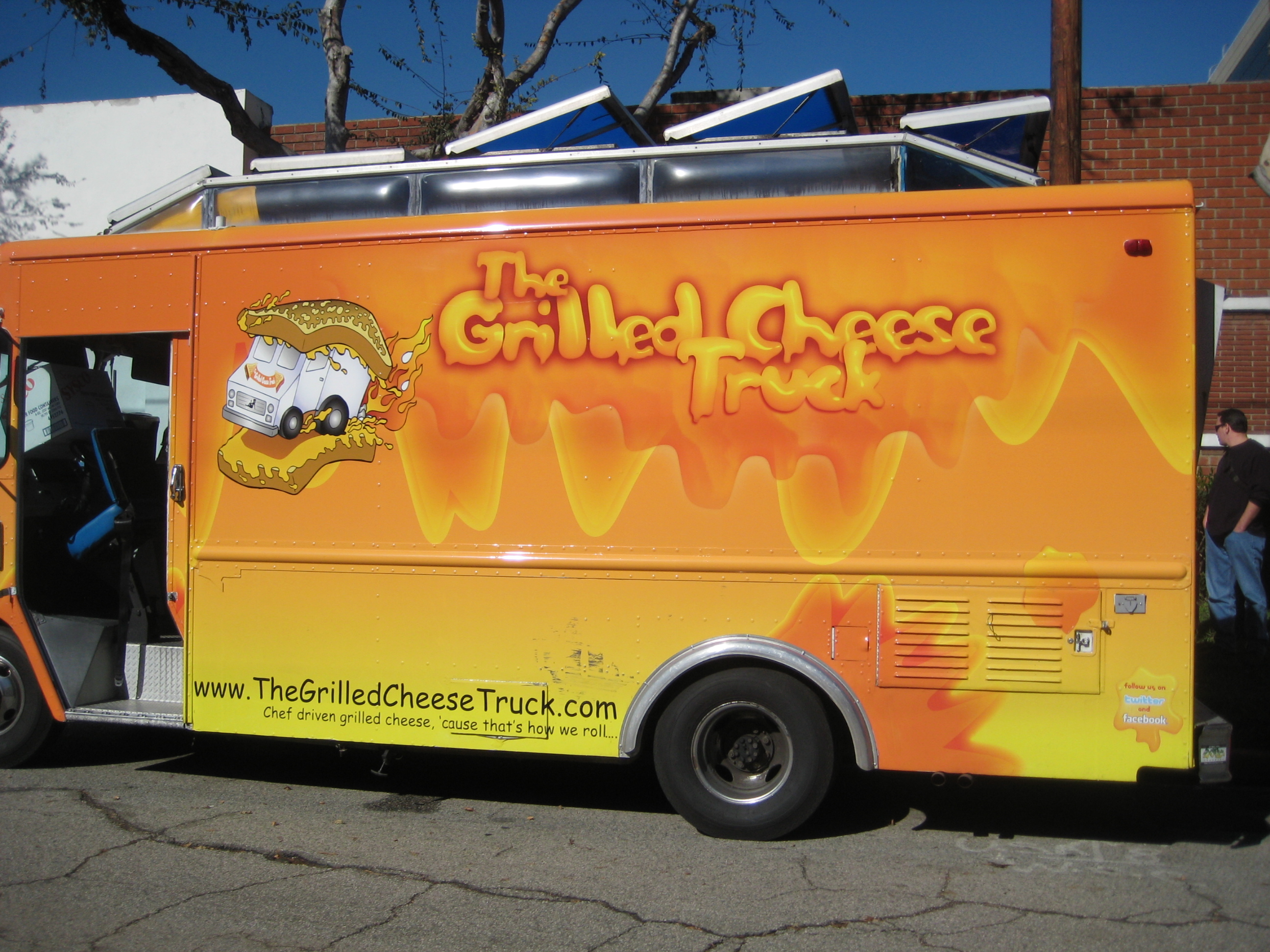
The Grilled Cheese Truck

The Grilled Cheese Truck started as a joint venture between Dave Danhi (a Los Angeles-based chef) and Michele Grant (chef and entrepreneur).

Danhi devised the idea when he competed in the 7th Annual Grilled Cheese Invitational, a grilled cheese competition that takes place every Spring in Los Angeles, California. As he left the competition and saw the food trucks lined up outside, as well as the interest in grilled cheese from the competition, he got the idea to open the "grilled cheese food truck".

The Grilled Cheese Truck has been awarded accolades including "10 Best Grilled Cheese Trucks" and one of the "Top 10 Sandwiches in LA". Grant, Danhi and the truck have had television appearances on The Price Is Right, Unwrapped, House of Food, Be Our Guest, The Rachael Ray Show, The Joan and Melissa Show, and The Cooking Channel. Danhi's grilled cheese recipes have appeared in talk shows, magazines, blogs and cookbooks.

== History and business activity ==
On October 18, 2012, TRIG Acquisition 1, Inc., a Delaware Form 10 company, acquired The Grilled Cheese Truck brand. The company subsequently changed its name to The Grilled Cheese Truck, followed by another name change to American Patriot Brands (APB). In 2012, when Grant left the company, the company merged with TRIG Acquisition 1, Inc., forming Grilled Cheese Truck, Inc. This merger helped to expand the company to other markets and they have plans to become the first publicly traded food truck. The company also enlisted General Wesley Clark (USA, Ret.) to help bring The Grilled Cheese Truck national. His primary focus is to help promote, identify, train, support and help franchise return service veterans with their own Grilled Cheese Trucks.

On July 14, 2020, over social media, Danhi announced via social media that The Grilled Cheese Truck was to permanently close by the end of the month.

== Crowdfunding ==
Big Cheese Inc., owner of The Grilled Cheese Truck brand, filed a Form-C on January 18, 2017, to raise capital through JOBS Act securities regulations on Microventures. The Grilled Cheese Truck successfully closed the first ever Reg CF equity crowdfunding campaign by a food truck on Microventures with 332 investors investing $199,186 on April 1, 2017.

== Reception ==
The Grilled Cheese Truck has been awarded accolades including:

- Los Angeles Hot List: 2011 #1 Food Truck in LA
- Los Angeles Times: Reader's Choice 2012 - Best Food Truck
- Culture Cheese Mag's 10 Best Grilled Cheese Trucks"
- LA Weekly's Top 10 Sandwiches in Los Angeles
- Grant, Danhi and the truck have had television appearances on The Price is Right, Unwrapped, House of Food, Be Our Guest, The Rachael Ray Show, The Joan and Melissa Show, and The Cooking Channel.
- Thrillist Los Angeles' Best Food Trucks
- Relish: America's 10 Best Grilled Cheese Sandwiches
- The Daily Meal: Los Angeles 15 Best Food Trucks of 2013
- 2013 #1 People's Choice Award at the Grilled Cheese Invitational
- Danhi's grilled cheese recipes have appeared in talk shows, magazines, blogs and cookbooks. Including The Wakey Bacon Melt, The Cheesy Mac 'N Rib, and others.

== See also ==
- Food cart
- List of food trucks
- Mobile catering
- Street food
- List of food companies
