= Mobile catering =

Selling prepared food from a vehicle

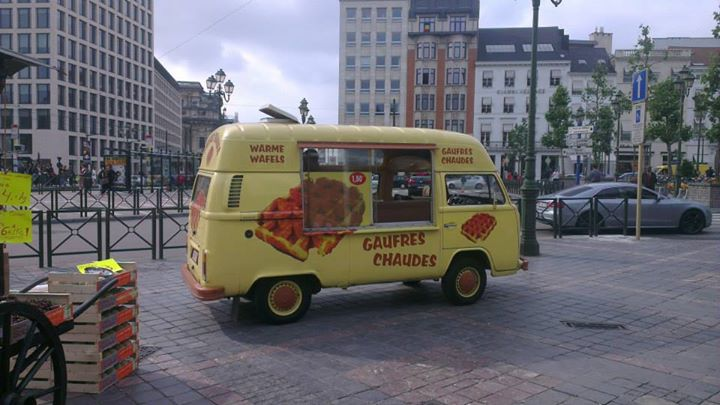
A van selling waffles in Brussels, Belgium.

Mobile catering is the business of selling prepared food from some sort of vehicle. It is a feature of urban culture in many countries. Mobile catering can be performed using food trucks, trailers, carts and food stands with many types of foods that can be prepared. Modern mobile catering also includes compact coffee carts and espresso bars, which are commonly used at corporate events and retail activations. Mobile catering is also used to provide food to people during times of emergency.

== Variants ==
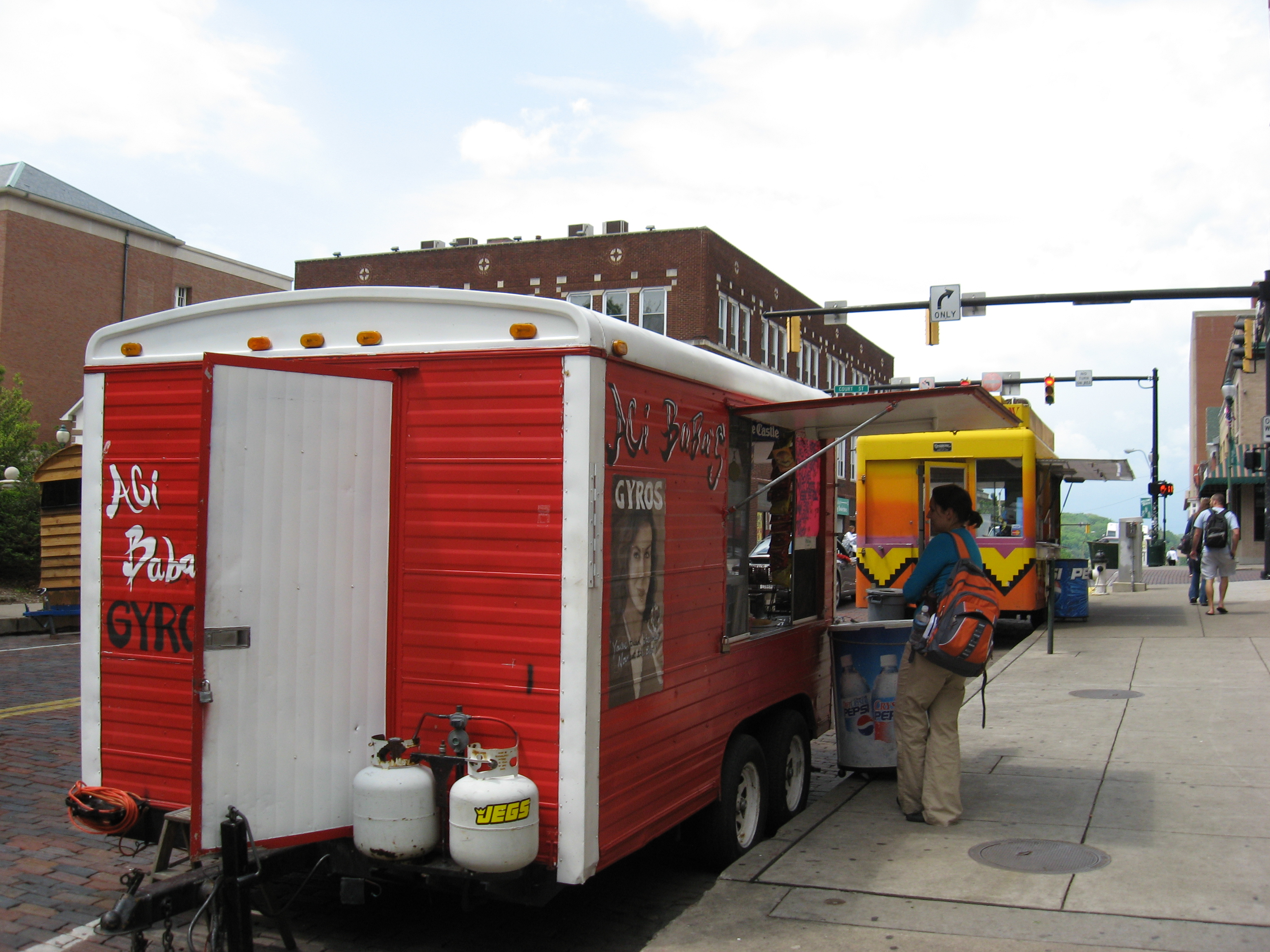
A gyro truck in Athens, Ohio.

A food cart is a motorless trailer that can be hauled by automobile, bicycle, or hand to the point of sale, often a public sidewalk or park. Carts typically have an onboard heating and/or refrigeration system to keep the food ready for consumption. Foods and beverages often served from carts include

- Hot dogs and other sausages in the United States (see hot dog stand)
- Tacos, burritos and other Mexican-style food that can be held in the hand, thus lending the name taco truck or, in Spanish, "lonchera"
- Halal food such as lamb or chicken over rice, or in a gyro
- Ice cream and other frozen treats
- Coffee, bagels, doughnuts, egg sandwiches, e.g., bacon, egg, and cheese, and other breakfast items
- Pig roast is often served in a bread bun or baguette with apple sauce or sage & onion stuffing.
- BBQ popular food items include burgers, sausages and chicken.

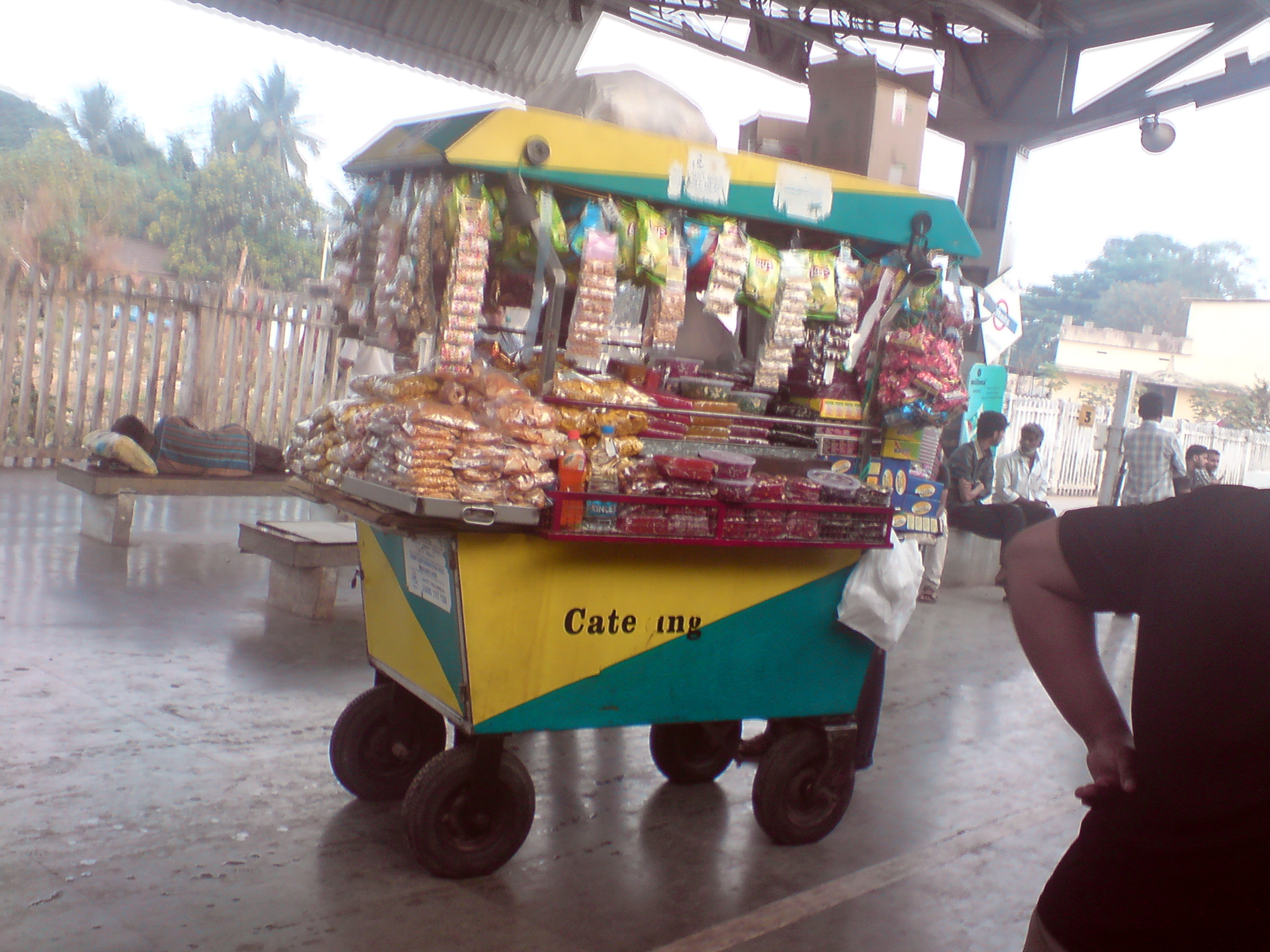
Mobile catering for Indian railways

A catering truck enables a vendor to sell a larger volume than a cart and to reach a larger market. The service is similar; the truck carries a stock of prepared foods that customers can buy. Ice cream vans are a familiar example of a catering truck in Canada, the United States and the United Kingdom.

A food truck or mobile kitchen is a modified van with a built-in barbecue grill, deep fryer, or other cooking equipment. It offers more flexibility in the menu since the vendor can prepare food to order as well as fresh foods in advance. A vendor can choose to park the van in one place, as with a cart, or to broaden the business's reach by driving the van to several customer locations. Examples of mobile kitchens include taco trucks on the west coast of the United States, especially in Southern California, and fish and chips vans in the United Kingdom. These vehicles are sometimes dysphemistically called "roach coaches" or "ptomaine wagons".

A concession trailer has preparation equipment like a mobile kitchen, but it cannot move on its own. As such it is suited for events lasting several days, such as travelling funfairs.

== Uses ==
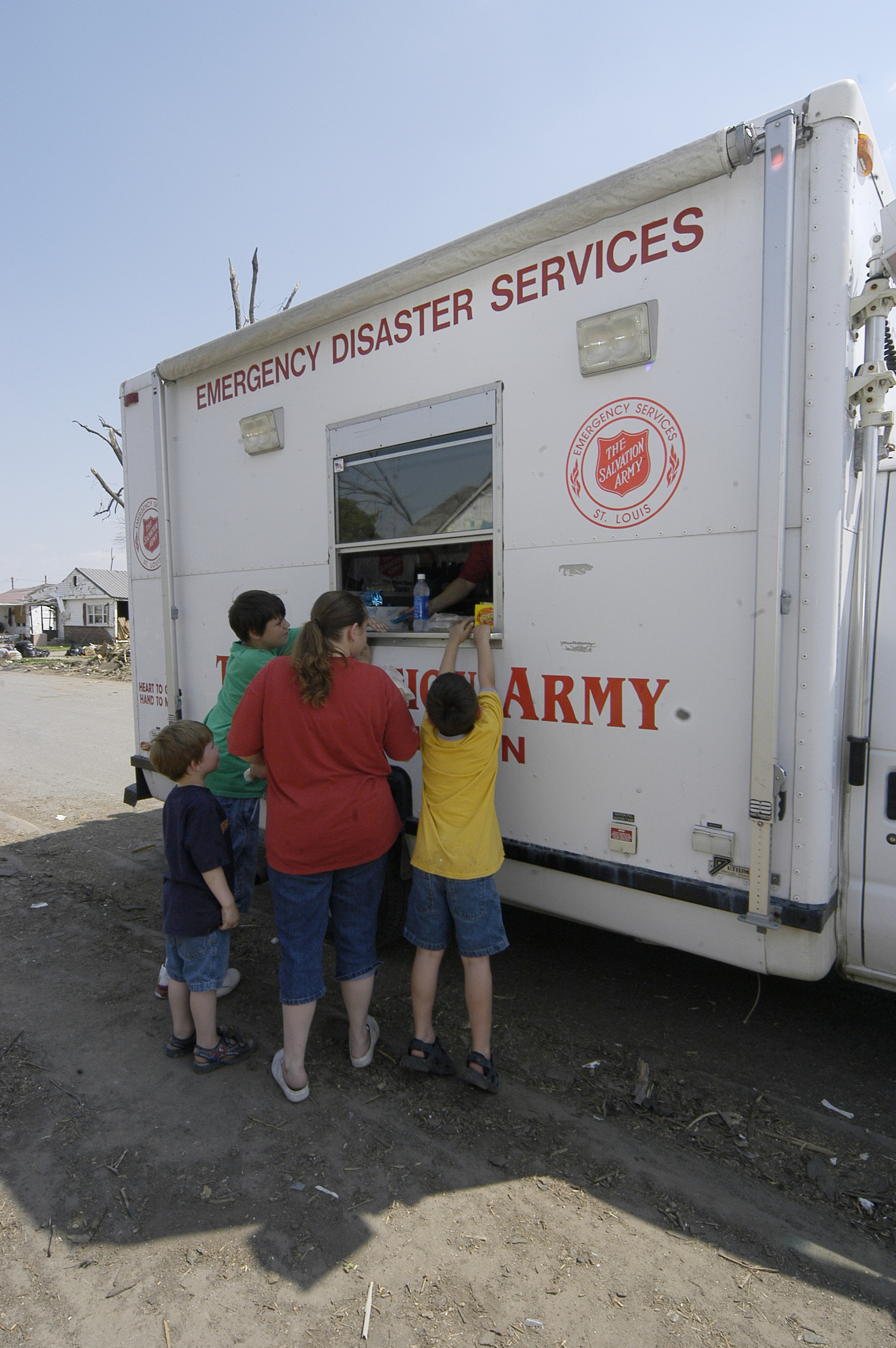
People in Caruthersville, Missouri receiving food and supplies from a Salvation Army disaster relief truck in April 2006

In addition to being operated as private businesses, mobile catering vehicles are also used after natural disasters to feed people in areas with damaged infrastructure. The Salvation Army has several mobile kitchens that it uses for this purpose.

Mobile catering vehicles have also provided a niche for advertisers to target the working population and general audience. With a wide variety of display options, lunch truck advertising has exploded into a successful marketing venture for many companies, including Outdoor Ad Systems, LLC and Roaming Hunger.

Mobile catering is popular throughout New York City, though can sometimes be unprofitable.

== See also ==
- Catering
- Chuckwagon
- Diner
- Food cart
- Food truck
  - List of food trucks
- Gastronorm sizes
- Pojangmacha
- Street food
- Taco stand
- Yatai (food cart)
