= Burger Theory =

South Australian fast food restaurant chain

Coordinates: 34°55′22″S 138°36′31″E

- Industry: Food
- Founded: 2011
- Headquarters: Adelaide, South Australia
- Number of locations: 1 (as of June 2019)
- Key people: Dan Mendelson, Rob Dean
- Products: Fast Food
- Website: burgertheory.com

Burger Theory was a chain of hamburger restaurants based in Adelaide, South Australia. Founded as a food truck in 2011, they expanded to operate three stores in the state. In 2019, they reduced business to a single store following changes to their recipe, then were later absorbed into The Tavern, Flinders University's on-campus student bar.

== History ==
Founded in 2011 by Dan Mendelson and Rob Dean as a food truck, the company is credited with bringing the food truck movement to South Australia. They started before the Adelaide City Council had legislation regarding food trucks in place, preventing the truck from working on city streets. However, a pilot program was created by the council later that year permitting Burger Theory to operate on a limited number of street sites in the central business district.

In 2012, Mendelson and Dean opened Pearl's Diner as their first brick and mortar premises, before opening a dedicated Burger Theory store in Adelaide the following year. They subsequently opened outlets at Flinders University and the University of Adelaide. In late 2015 they opened a store in Melbourne, but this proved unsuccessful. Still looking to expand, in 2016 they signed a memorandum of understanding with a Chinese investor in which it was planned to open 120 franchises of Burger Theory in China.

In 2017, they announced that they would no longer sell chicken and bacon at their store, and their existing beef burgers would be a combination of beef fat and kangaroo meat.

In 2019, Burger Theory closed two stores, with one remaining. The final store was later rebranded under Flinders University's The Tavern student bar.

== See also ==
- List of food trucks
- List of South Australian manufacturing businesses
- South Australian food and drink
