= Chef Jeremiah =

American chef

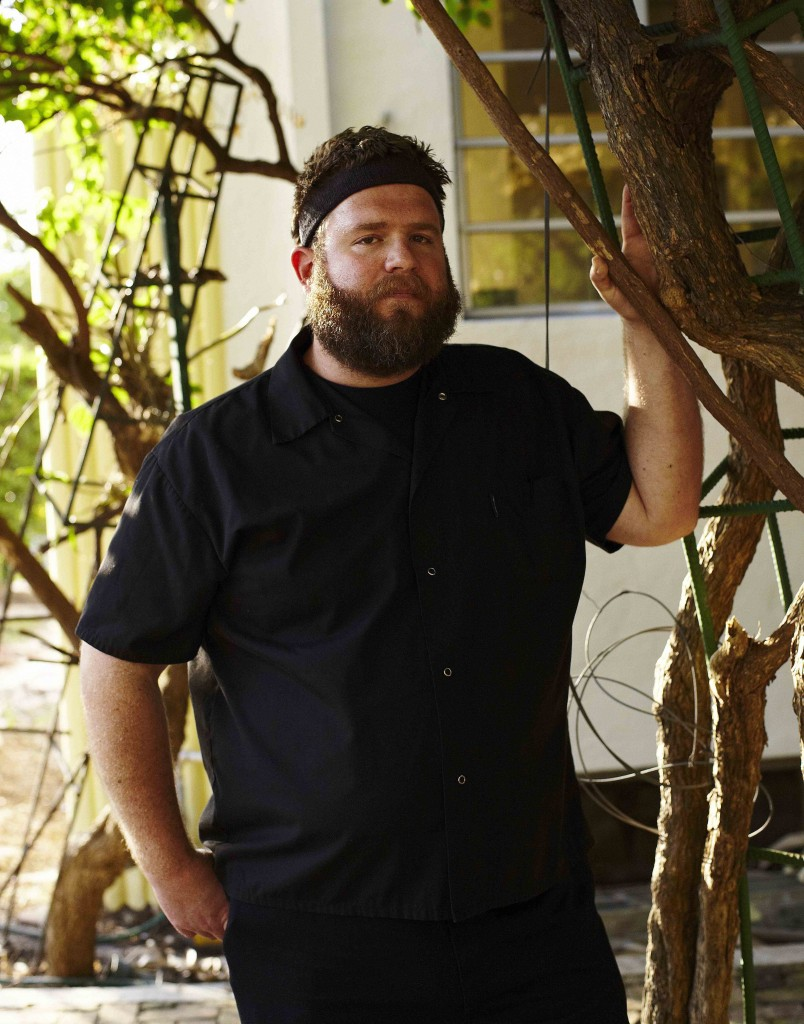
Chef Jeremiah in Miami

Chef Jeremiah is an American chef.

== Early career ==
Chef Jeremiah's career began in 1998 at Johnson & Wales Culinary School in North Miami, Florida. After his training, he worked at Michelin-starred elBulli (under Ferran Adrià), wd~50, Noma, Restaurant Aquavit, Spice Market, and Café Grey.

== Restaurant and street food projects ==
In 2009, Chef Jeremiah converted a 1962 Airstream trailer into a mobile kitchen and launched gastroPod Miami, a street food truck in South Florida. Within a year, gastroPod was named Best Food Truck by the Miami New Times. Specialties over the years have included the Old Dirty Dog (a smoked short-rib hot dog on a potato bun and topped with sweet/spicy slaw), the Bánh Mì Taco (oxtail, trotters, country pâté, and pickled radishes), the Sloppy José with brisket and Curry in a Hurry (vegan curry with rice). Later, gastroPod expanded to add the semi-annual podBrunch series in roving locations. One such event at the Wolfsonian Museum in Miami Beach Florida featured a prix fixe menu of French toast ice cream, egg and potato taco, charred yam cavatelli and pumpkin spice bundt cakes, among other items.

In 2012, Chef Jeremiah expanded his business beyond gastroPod with The Pickle Peoples. In an interview, Chef Jeremiah said his Kickstarter-funded pickling project "is about using technology and cutting-edge techniques to streamline a time-honored tradition." Some of his pickled creations have been used in specialty cocktails at the pop-up bar The Broken Shaker.

In late 2013, Chef Jeremiah opened Subatomic Sandwiches at the Wolfsonian-FIU museum in Miami Beach, Florida.

== Rick Ross' Chef ==
Chef Jeremiah is a personal chef to rapper Rick Ross. Chef Jeremiah appeared alongside the rapper in a 2013 Reebok Classics television commercial called "Rick Ross Lives White Hot".

== Television appearances ==
In a season 9 episode of the Food Network reality series Chopped, Chef Jeremiah made it to the final round. In 2014, he faced off against Bobby Flay over Cuban sandwiches on season 2 of the Food Network program Beat Bobby Flay. In 2015, he made it to the final round of Cutthroat Kitchen: The Truck Stops Here.

In 2017, he teamed up with Complex Networks as the star of his own reality series, Chef Jeremiah Forks It!, which aired on Verizon's go90 and Complex.com.

== Food festivals ==
Chef Jeremiah is the founder of two annual food festivals in Miami—Duck Duck Goose and PIG! (Pork is Good). In 2018, the third installment of Duck Duck Goose featured Miami area chefs preparing local and pasture-raised fowl.

== See also ==
- List of Chopped episodes
- List of food trucks
