= Rancho Bravo Tacos =

Defunct chain of Mexican restaurants in Seattle, Washington, U.S.

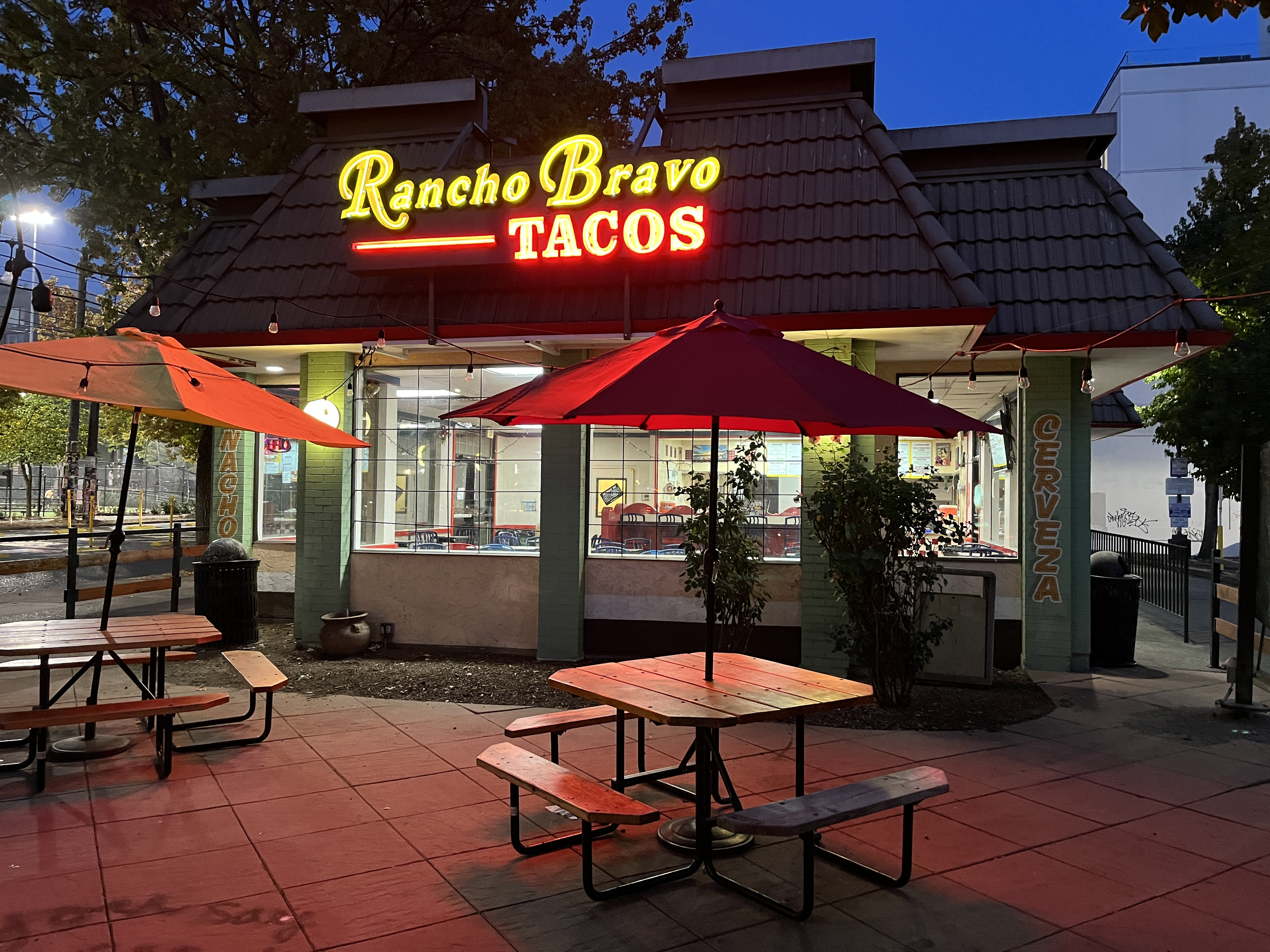
- Exterior of the Capitol Hill restaurant, 2022
- Interactive map of Rancho Bravo Tacos

Restaurant information
- Established: 2002
- Closed: 2023
- Owner: Freddy Rivas
- Food type: Mexican
- Location: 211 Northeast 45th Street, Seattle, King, Washington, 98105, United States
- Coordinates: 47.6612°N 122.32643°W
- Website: ranchobravotacos.com

Rancho Bravo Tacos was a small chain of Mexican restaurants in Seattle, in the U.S. state of Washington. Owner Freddy Rivas started the business as a food truck in Kent in 2002, before relocating to Wallingford in 2007. The business also operated restaurants on Capitol Hill and in the University District. Serving cuisine such as tacos, nachos, burritos, tamales, and tortas, the business garnered a generally positive reception as an inexpensive and late night option for diners, with the tacos and burritos receiving the most praise.

== Description ==
Rancho Bravo Tacos was a Latino-owned taqueria in Seattle. The business operated on Capitol Hill, in the University District, and in the Wallingford neighborhood. The Mexican restaurant has served tacos (including al pastor and beef tongue varieties), nachos, burritos, bowls, tamales, and chorizo tortas. Tacos come with avocado, cilantro, lime salsa, and tomatillo.

The Capitol Hill restaurant, previously occupied by KFC, offered drive-through service. The Wallingford location, housed in a building which previously operated as a Winchell's Donuts shop, had a smaller menu.

== History ==
Owner Freddy Rivas initially operated the business as a food truck, starting in Kent in 2002. He relocated to a Wallingford parking lot in May 2007. Rivas was an "outspoken opponent" to a 2011 proposal that would permit on-street food trucks in Seattle. A brick-and-mortar location, at a former KFC on Pine Street on Capitol Hill, opened in March 2009. Another location opened in the University District on The Ave in 2017.

A food truck by breakfast restaurant chain Patty's Eggiest operated in the Walingford location's parking lot as of 2017. An assault on a trans woman at the Capitol Hill location in 2017 prompted the business to change its surveillance policy. A post on social media said, "out of respect for personal privacy we have had a policy of not monitoring the dining area. In light of recent events we will now change that policy." King County Public Health investigators investigated the Capitol Hill restaurant in 2017, after multiple people got sick with gastroenteritis.

The restaurant cooperated with organizers of the Capitol Hill Occupied Protest (2020), also known as the Capitol Hill Autonomous Zone (CHAZ). In his 2021 book Unmasked: Inside Antifa's Radical Plan to Destroy Democracy, Andy Ngo wrote, "The security team's operating base was in the open-air eating section of the Rancho Bravo Tacos restaurant, where they had set up a large tent. The business seemingly allowed or tolerated CHAZ security to set up camp there in exchange for peace."

In 2023, Rivas closed the Capitol Hill location, which became the Mexican restaurant Teto's Cantina. The Wallingford location also became a Teto's Cantina restaurant in April 2024. Both Teto's locations closed by 2025 and the Capitol Hill location is slated to become a Burritos California restaurant.

== Reception ==
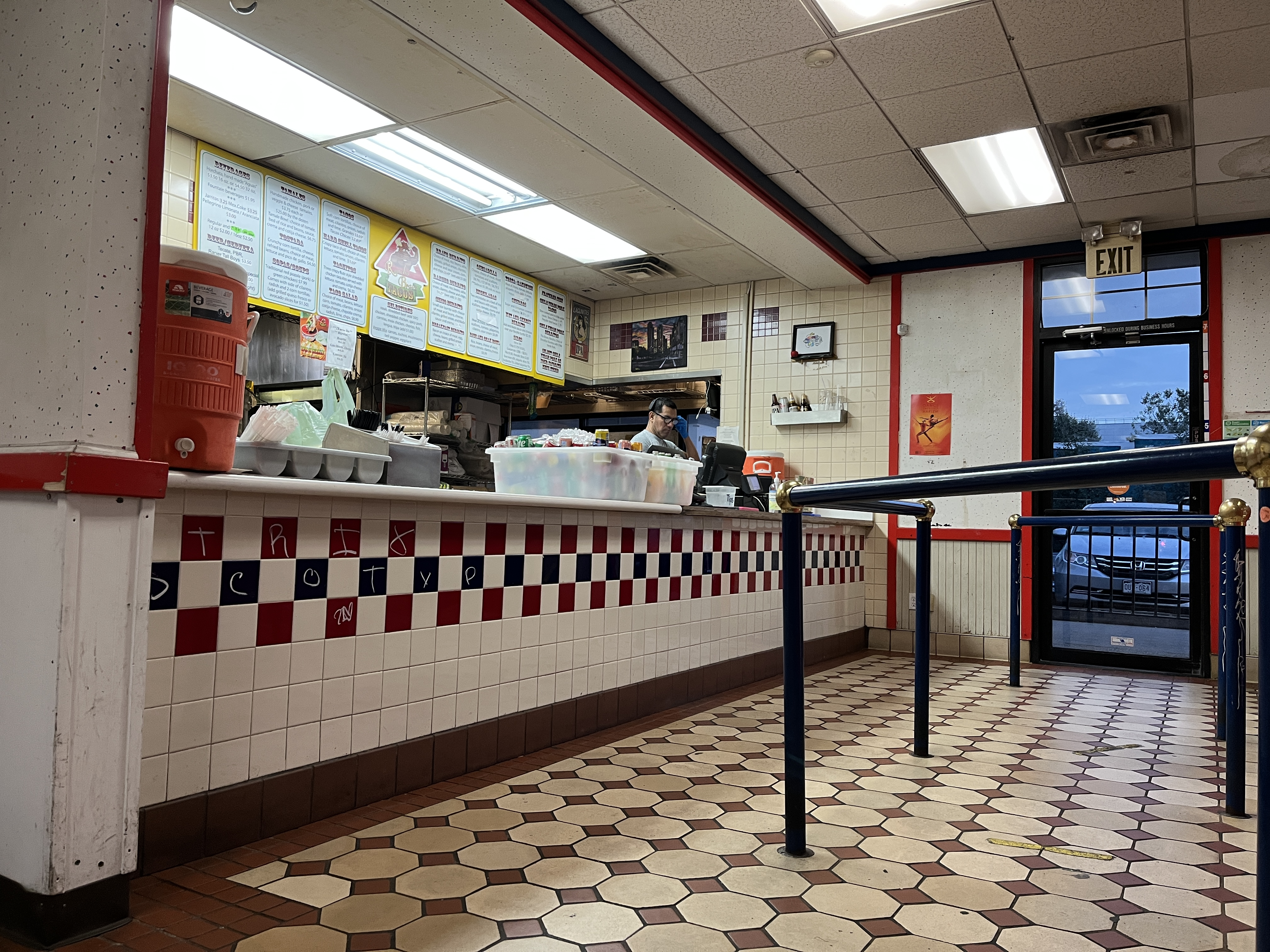
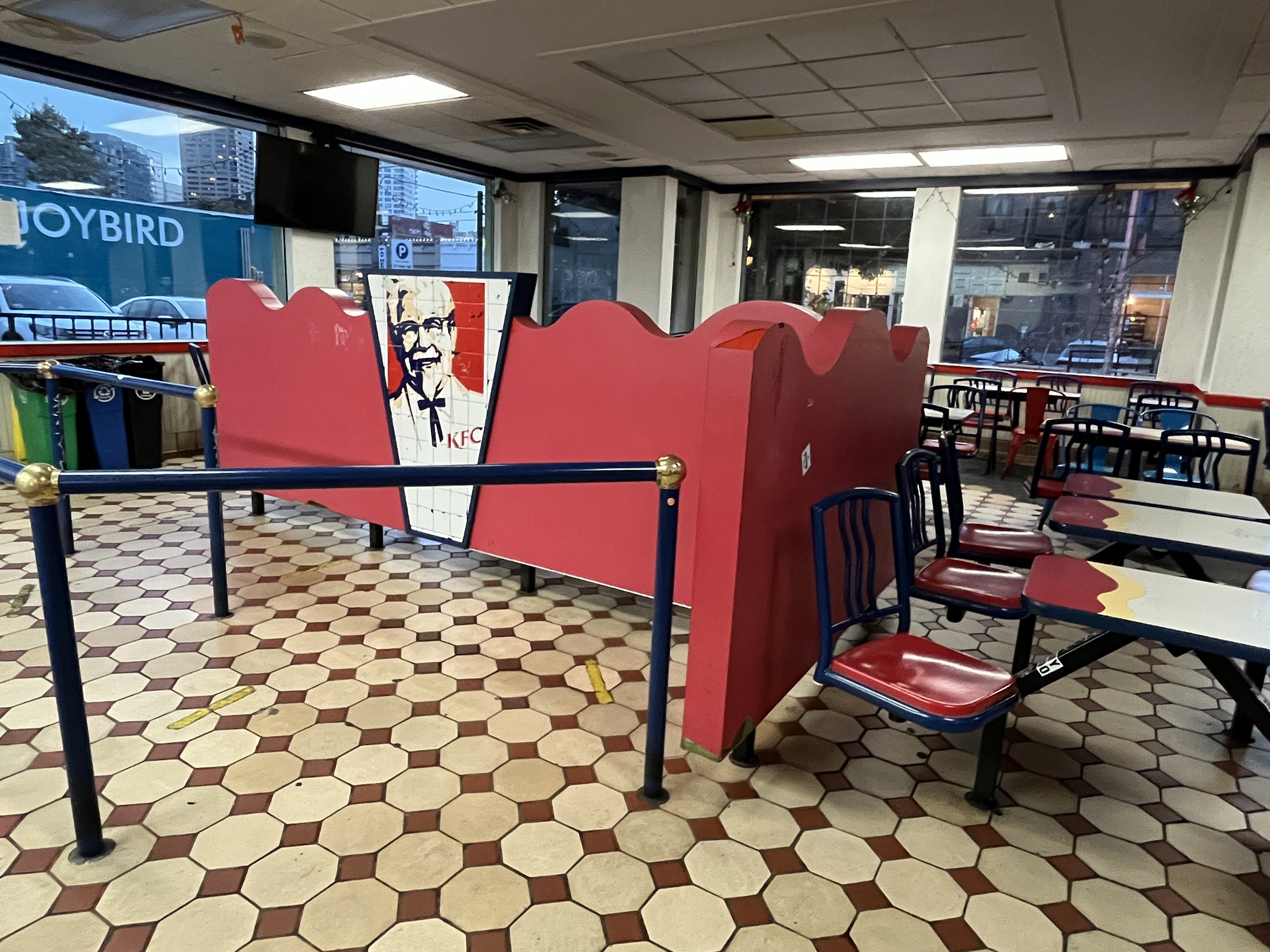
Interior of the Capitol Hill location, which previously operated as a KFC restaurant, in 2022

The business garnered a generally positive reception. However, in 2008, Jonah Spangenthal-Lee wrote in The Stranger:

After writing a few nasty things about Wallingford's Rancho Bravo taco truck on The Stranger's blog, I caught plenty of flack from alleged taco connoisseurs in the area, who are insanely protective of their neighborhood taco truck... Because of Pasadita's recent slump, Rancho Bravo is no longer my least favorite taco truck in Seattle. I'd visited Rancho Bravo several times over the last year and never been very impressed. On more than one visit, my burrito was cold and limp, filled with mealy, overcooked pork; the tacos were unappealingly greasy and completely underwhelming. Much to my surprise, Rancho Bravo's food has improved of late, but it's still far from perfect.

Contrastingly, Ana Sofia Knauf recommended Rancho Bravo Tacos in a 2016 "Guide to Cheap Eats on a College Student's Budget" in The Stranger; in which she said the Capitol Hill restaurant was "more suited for a quick bite". The Not for Tourists Guide to Seattle said, "Locals are fanatical for the tacos." Fodor's said in 2017, "Pork tacos are the favorite at this humble taco truck." Thrillist said, "Tried and true, the Cap Hill Rancho Bravos never fail to satisfy after a late night of weekend drinking. Open until 3am on Friday and Saturday, Rancho's Bravo Burrito is the perfect thing to combat the closing time spins." Thrillist's Chona Kasinger included the Bravo Burrito in a 2014 list of Seattle's eight best burritos.

In her 2014 list of five "delicious and cheap" tacos in Seattle, Jenny Kuglin of Seattle Refined wrote, "This is a food truck that you should definitely stop at if you're driving through Wallingford." In 2017, Megan Hill of Eater Seattle described Rancho Bravo Tacos as a "late-night drunk food favorite". Bree Coven included the business in The Seattle Times' 2019 recommendations for inexpensive date nights, or "where to go in Seattle for $20 or less per person". Allecia Vermillion included the restaurant in Seattle Metropolitan's 2022 overview of recommended eateries in Wallingford.

== See also ==
- List of defunct restaurants of the United States
- List of food trucks
- List of Mexican restaurants
