= Maximus/Minimus =

Food truck based in Seattle, Washington

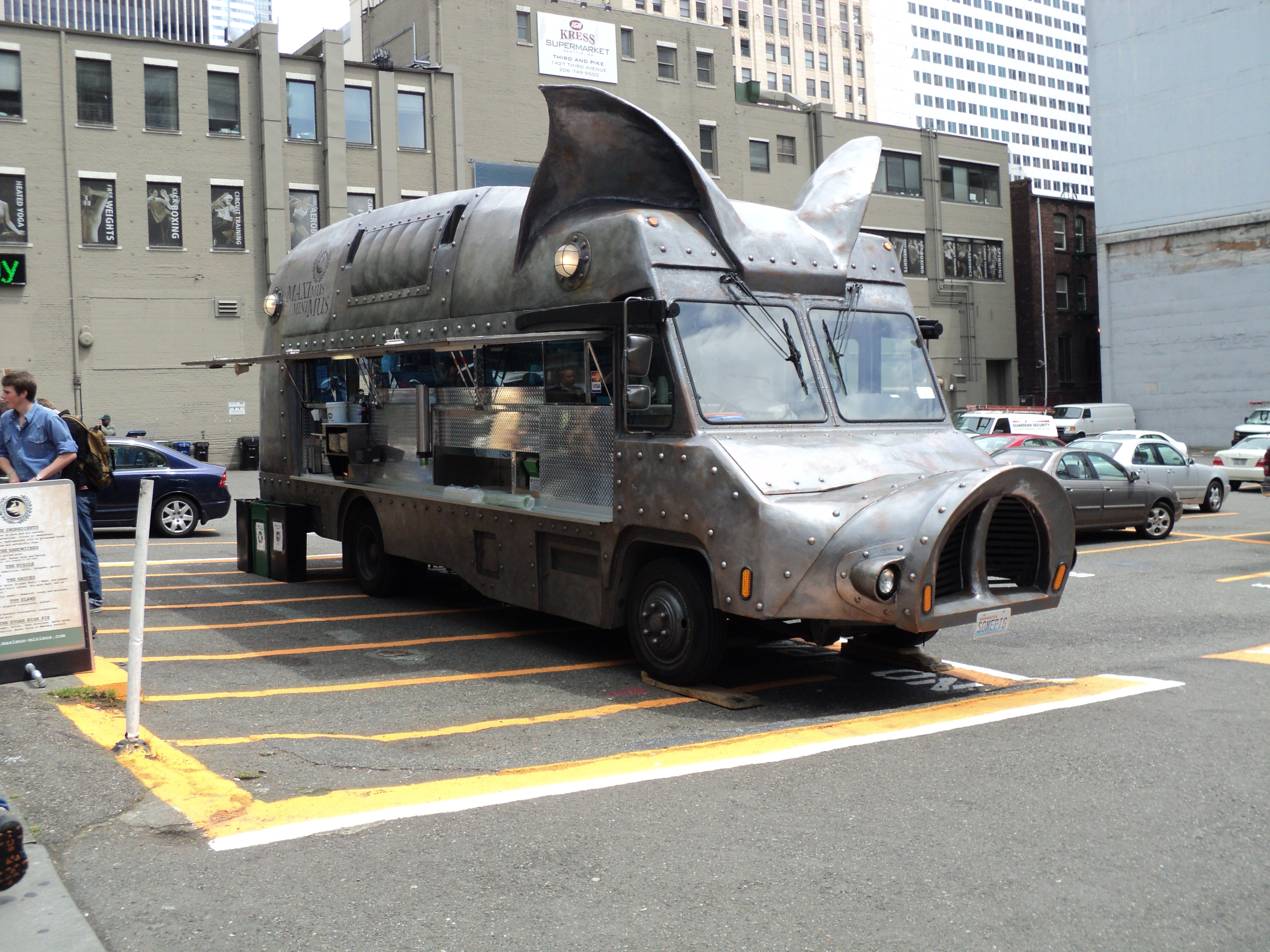
The Maximus/Minimus food truck, at the corner of Pike Street and 2nd Avenue in downtown Seattle, Washington

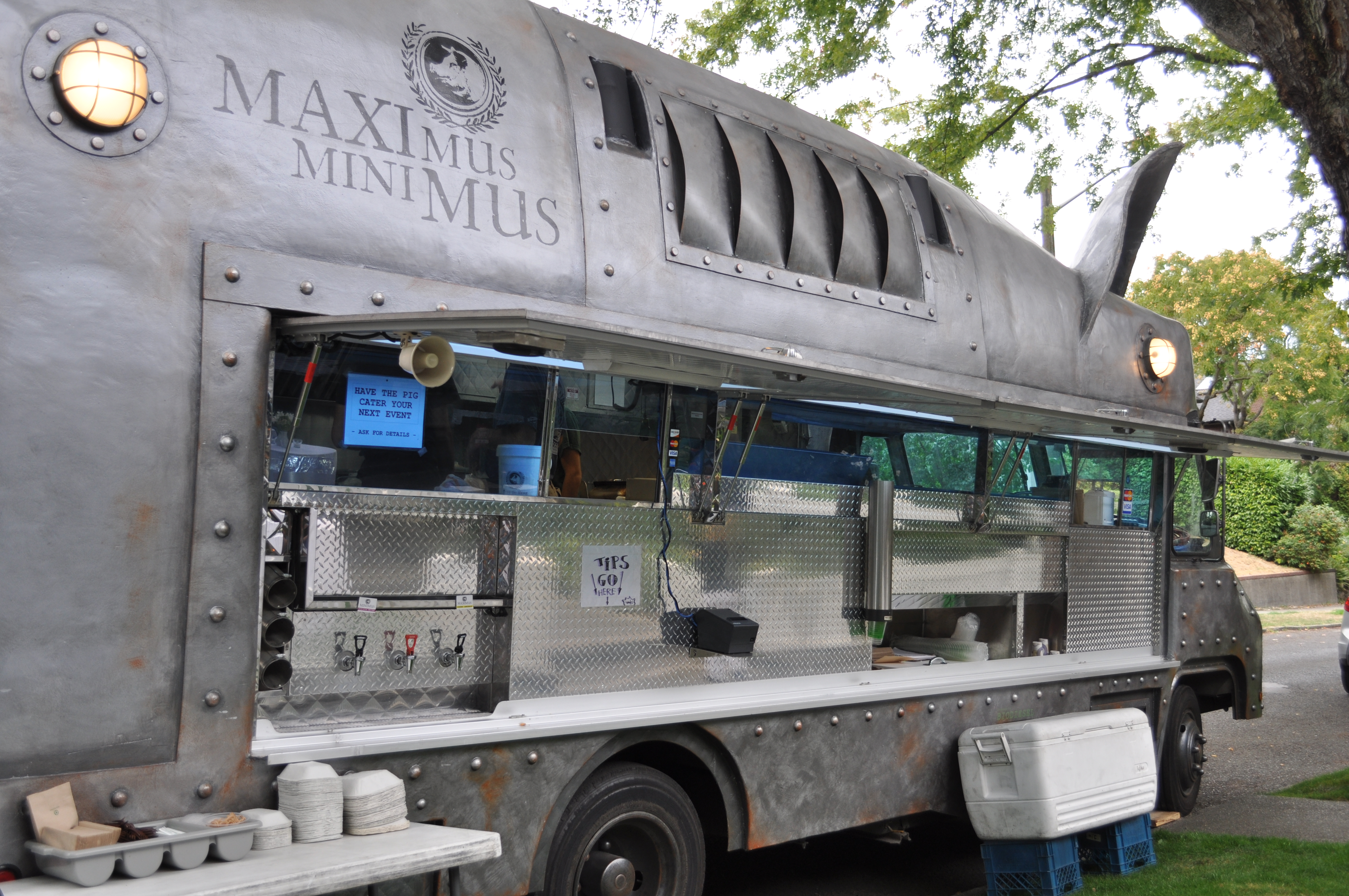
The truck's service window

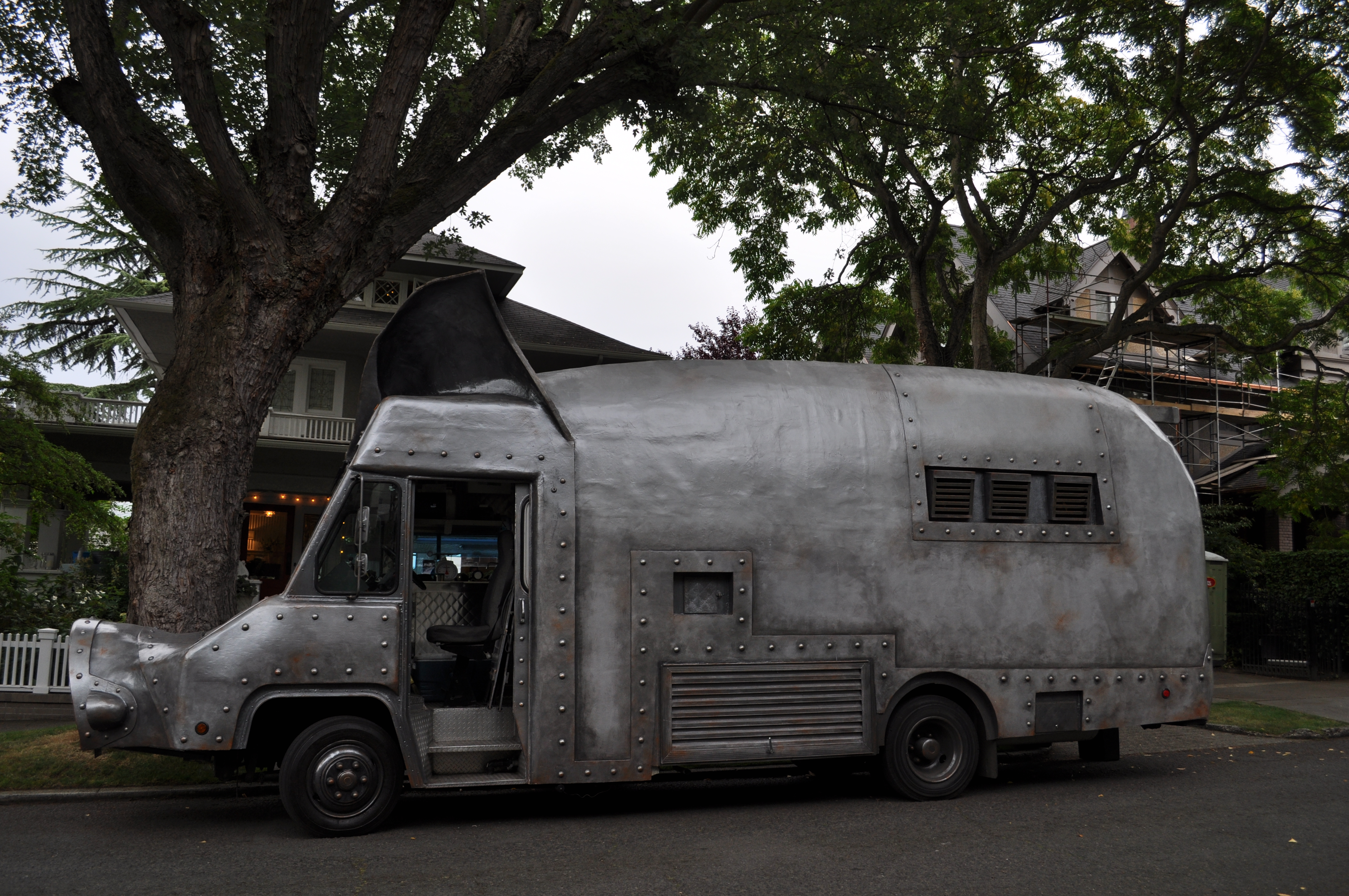
Left side view of Maximus/Minimus

Maximus/Minimus was a food truck based in Seattle, Washington. It was established by Kurt Beecher Dammeier in June 2009 and the truck was designed by Colin Reedy. Dammeier also owns the truck and enterprise. The truck was built to resemble a pig, and has metallic enhancements that resemble a pig's snout and ears. The truck often parked at 6th Avenue and Pike Street in downtown Seattle, and at festivals and farmer's markets. Maximus Minimus announced on Facebook in April 2017 that it would not be opening.

== Fare ==
The truck offered pork dishes, such as pulled pork sandwiches, chicken and vegetarian sandwiches, macaroni and cheese, pozole and coleslaw. Dishes were available in bold (maximus) and light (minimus) styles, based upon the types of sauces used. The maximus sauce was prepared with peppers, onion, fruit juice and beer, and was stronger and spicier in flavor, while the milder minimus sauce was prepared with tamarind, molasses and honey and had a sweet flavor. The truck used cheese sourced from Beecher's Handmade Cheese, an artisan cheesemaker and retail shop founded by Dammeier and based in the Pike Place Market in Seattle.

The foods used were locally sourced and all natural. The truck's fare has been described as barbecue, but Dammeier has stated that it is not barbecue, and that the fare derives its flavor from the sauces used.

A brick and mortar restaurant based on the truck, Max's, was projected to open in 2015. This location has been referred to as the "mothership" to the truck.

== Reception ==
Maximus/Minimus received reviews and coverage on PBS, USA Today, NBC News, Parade, The Seattle Times, Seattle Weekly, The Stranger, and Modern Marvels (in an episode later repackaged as a Favorite Foods USA episode).

It was rated as one of "America’s top 15 street food vendors" by relish.com.

== See also ==
- List of food trucks
- Street food
