= Pincho Man =

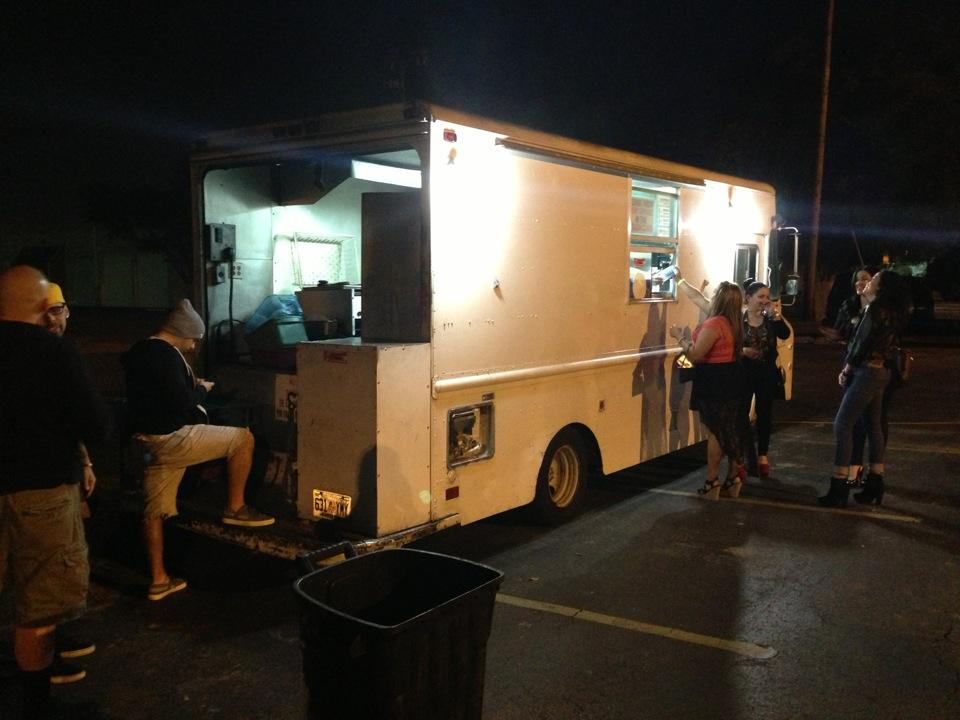
- Pincho Man food van at night

Restaurant information
- Location: Miami, Florida, USA

Pincho Man is a Miami-based late-night food truck specializing in Pinchitos, and one of the original trucks in Miami to be associated with the gourmet food truck trend.

== Recognition ==
Travel + Leisure magazine identified Pincho Man as one of Miami's top five food trucks, commenting, "Hailed as one of the city’s first food trucks, fans don’t mind waiting in lengthy lines for the elusive Miami legend’s skewered steak or chicken pinchos."

In 2013, Thrillist named the Pincho Deluxe one of five selections for Miami's Best Sandwiches, and commented, "Oh, you like food trucks? Well, this dude’s been serving food out of his unmarked white truck from undisclosed locations since Dade County had one area code." In 2015, the Miami edition of Eater listed Pincho Man at No. 15 of "South Florida's 16 Most Iconic Burgers." Pincho Man is included at No. 15 in the book, 100 Things To Do In Miami Before You Die.

== Menu ==
Signature items on the limited menu include the Pincho Deluxe, Off da Chain Burger, and Sammy Dog, all served with a "secret pincho sauce."

== See also ==
- List of food trucks
