= Food booth =

Booth or stand that sells food

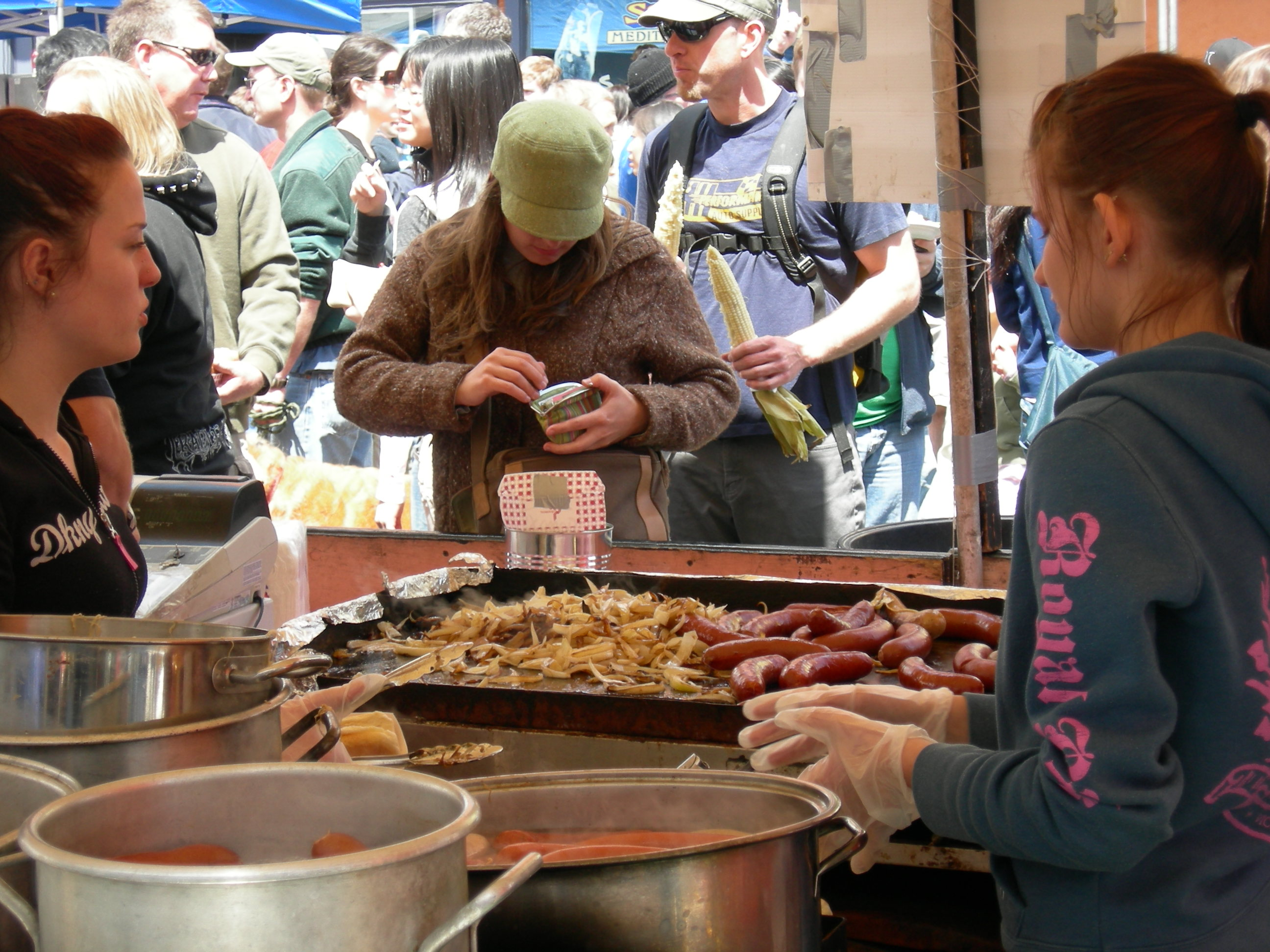
Food booth vendors cooking sausages at University District Street Fair, University District, Seattle, Washington

A food booth – also called a food kiosk, food stand, food stall or temporary food service facility – is a temporary structure used to prepare and sell food to the general public, usually where large groups of people are situated outdoors in a park, at a parade, near a stadium, or otherwise. Sometimes the term also refers to the business operations and vendors that operate from such booths.

== Background ==
There is evidence to suggest that certain foods have either originated from, or gained in popularity through, food booths. For example, the popularity of the ice cream cone in North America is attributed to the St. Louis World's Fair in 1904. According to legend, an ice cream seller had run out of clean dishes, and could not sell any more ice cream. Next door to the ice cream booth was the waffle booth, unsuccessful due to intense heat. The waffle maker offered to make cones by rolling up his waffles and the new product sold well, and was subsequently copied by other vendors.

== Operations ==
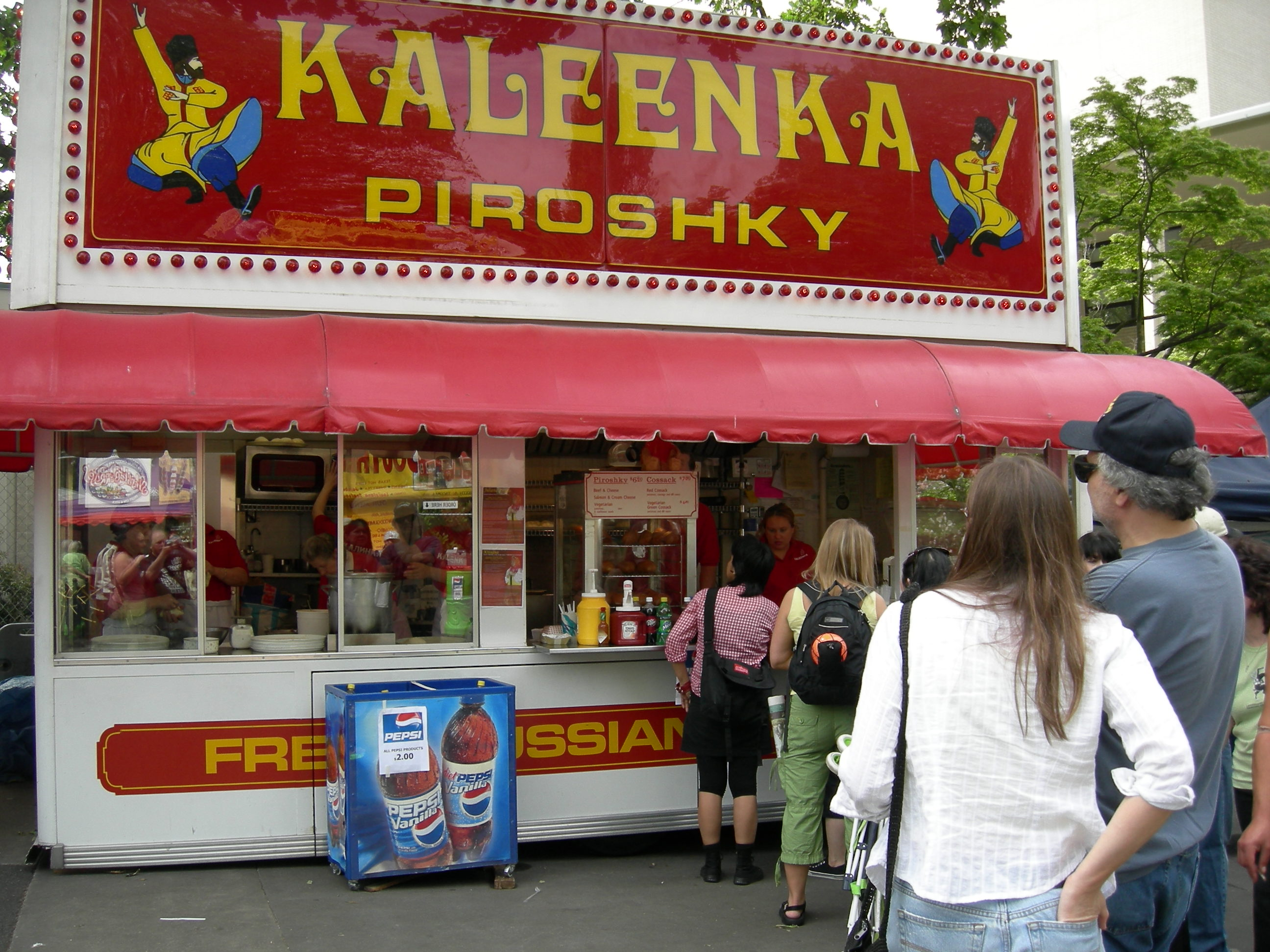
Kaleenka Piroshky food booth at Northwest Folklife Festival, Seattle Center

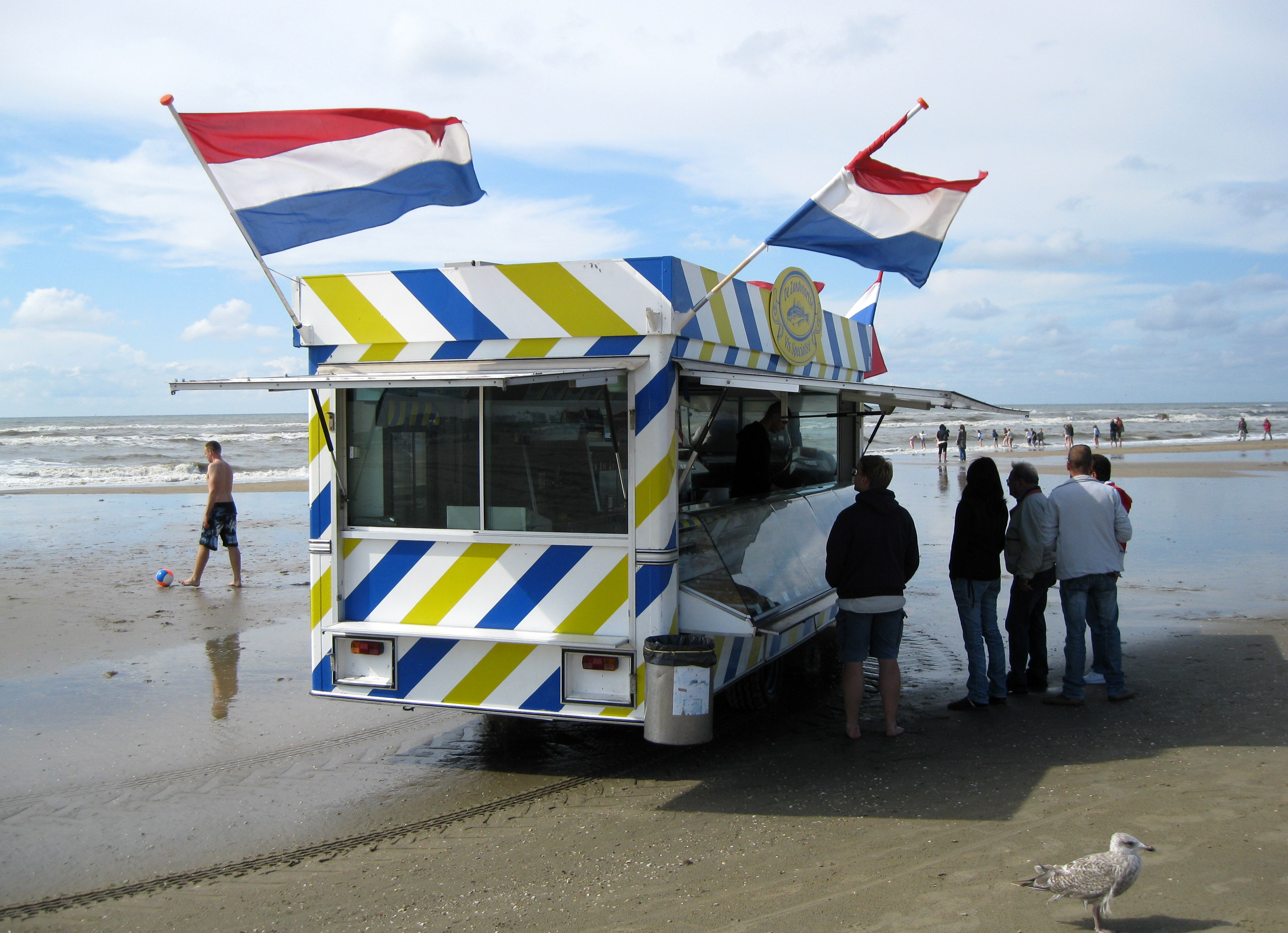
Food booth at Zandvoort beach, the Netherlands

A common practice is for modern food booths to operate as concession stands at various kinds of special events. These may be operated by small independent vendors, catering companies, or by established restaurants offering a subset of items featured from a more comprehensive menu. Alternatively, some food booths may be operated by local nonprofit organizations as a means of fundraising. In some situations, nonprofits may face slightly lower processing fees, or less stringent regulations and contractual requirements, making such operations advantageous.

== Regulations ==
Depending on the jurisdiction, and local customs, operators of such booths ordinarily require a temporary food sales permit and government-issued licenses. Typically operators also must demonstrate compliance with various regulations for sanitation, public health and food safety. Such regulations include, for example:

- structural requirements for the construction and placement of booths
- requirements or limitations regarding the hours and number of days of continuous operation
- restrictions on the handling and preparation of ingredients
- restrictions on the storage, transport and placement of ingredients
- rules regarding availability and proximity of waste disposal facilities and toilets
- rules governing conduct and cleanliness of operators
- rules governing animals and the use of pest control measures
- provisions imposing additional requirements if deemed necessary by an authorized on-site health inspector

=== On-site inspection ===
To oversee compliance with applicable regulations, many municipalities hire and deploy health inspectors, or provide general guidelines for inspection, in order to ensure food booths do not present an unreasonable risk of harm to customers. Hired inspectors are usually permitted to make unscheduled inspections of facilities with little or no advance notice to the proprietors. The rules regarding the frequency, scope and extent of routine on-site inspections vary depending on the jurisdiction. Also, some jurisdictions may establish priorities based on the type of food served, the type of organization involved, and other ancillary factors, such as any prior history of customer complaints.

== See also ==
- Fast food
- Food cart
- Food truck
  - List of food trucks
- Funfair
- Kiosk
- Local food
- Street food
- Taco stand
- Take-out
- Ice cream van
- Milk float
- Yatai (retail)
- Pojangmacha
