= Yardy Rum Bar =

Caribbean restaurant in Eugene, Oregon, U.S.

- Interactive map of Yardy Rum Bar

Restaurant information
- Owners: Nico Centanni; Isaiah Martinez
- Chef: Isaiah Martinez
- Food type: Caribbean
- Location: 837 Lincoln Street, Eugene, Oregon, 97401, United States
- Coordinates: 44.0505°N 123.0971°W
- Reservations: No
- Website: yardyrumbar.com

Yardy Rum Bar is a Caribbean restaurant and cocktail bar in Eugene, Oregon, United States.

== Description ==
The Caribbean restaurant and cocktail bar Yardy Rum Bar operates in Eugene, Oregon. The interior has orange walls and "Afro-Caribbean image motifs", according to KLCC. The counter service restaurant does not accept reservations.

Yardy uses seasonal ingredients sourced from the Pacific Northwest. The menu has included a fried chicken sandwich, pholourie (split-pea fritters sauced with mango, peppers, and tamarind), and the Jibarito No. 2, which is griyo pork with Scotch bonnets and Haitian pikliz slaw between twice-fried plantains. The restaurant has also served Creole pork shoulder, doubles, and salads. Among drink options are a daiquiri, a Manhattan, an old fashioned with rum, and punches.

== History ==
Isaiah Martinez is the chef; he and Nico Centanni are co-owners. The business launched as a pop-up restaurant in 2020, before operating from a food truck starting in 2021 and later moving into a brick and mortar space in a Victorian house near downtown Eugene in January or February 2024. The restaurant operates in the space that previously housed the crêpe and cocktail bar The Vintage.

== Reception ==
In 2025, Martinez was a semifinalist for the James Beard Foundation Award for Best Chef: Northwest & Pacific. Yardy was included in The New York Times's 2025 list of the fifty best restaurants in the United States. Brenna Houck included Yardy in Eater Portland's 2025 overview of the best restaurants and food carts in Eugene.

== See also ==
- List of food trucks
