= Off the Rez =

Restaurant in Seattle, Washington, U.S.

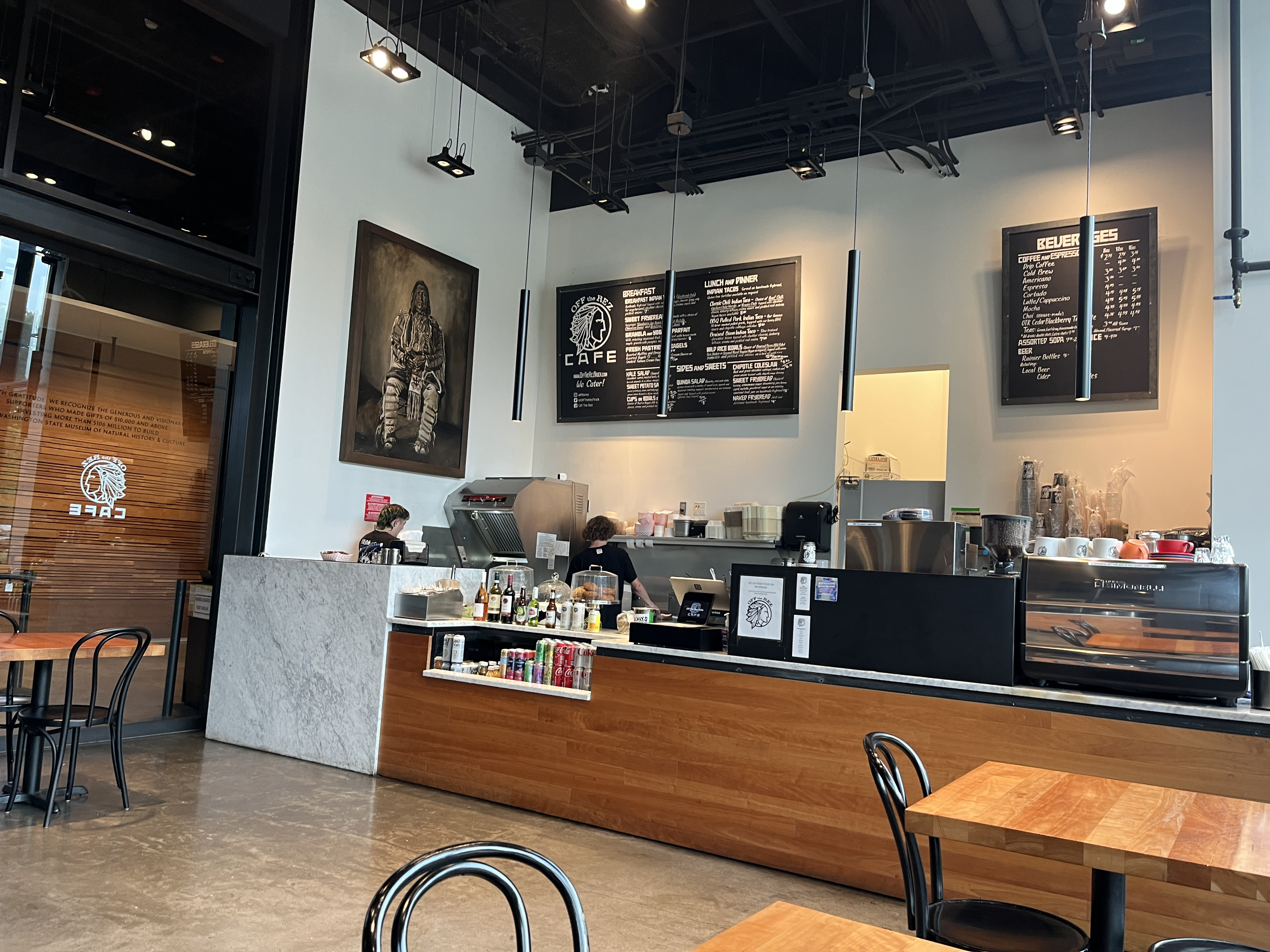
- Off the Rez cafe interior, June 2023
- Interactive map of Off the Rez

Restaurant information
- Established: 2011
- Owners: Mark McConnell; Cecilia Rikard
- Food type: Native American
- Location: Seattle, King, Washington, United States
- Coordinates: 47.66079381°N 122.31147973°W
- Website: offthereztruck.com

Off the Rez is a restaurant in Seattle, in the U.S. state of Washington. Owned by Mark McConnell of the Blackfeet Nation in Browning, Montana, as well as his partner, Cecilia Rikard, the business has operated as a food truck and as a cafe at the Burke Museum of Natural History and Culture.

== Description ==
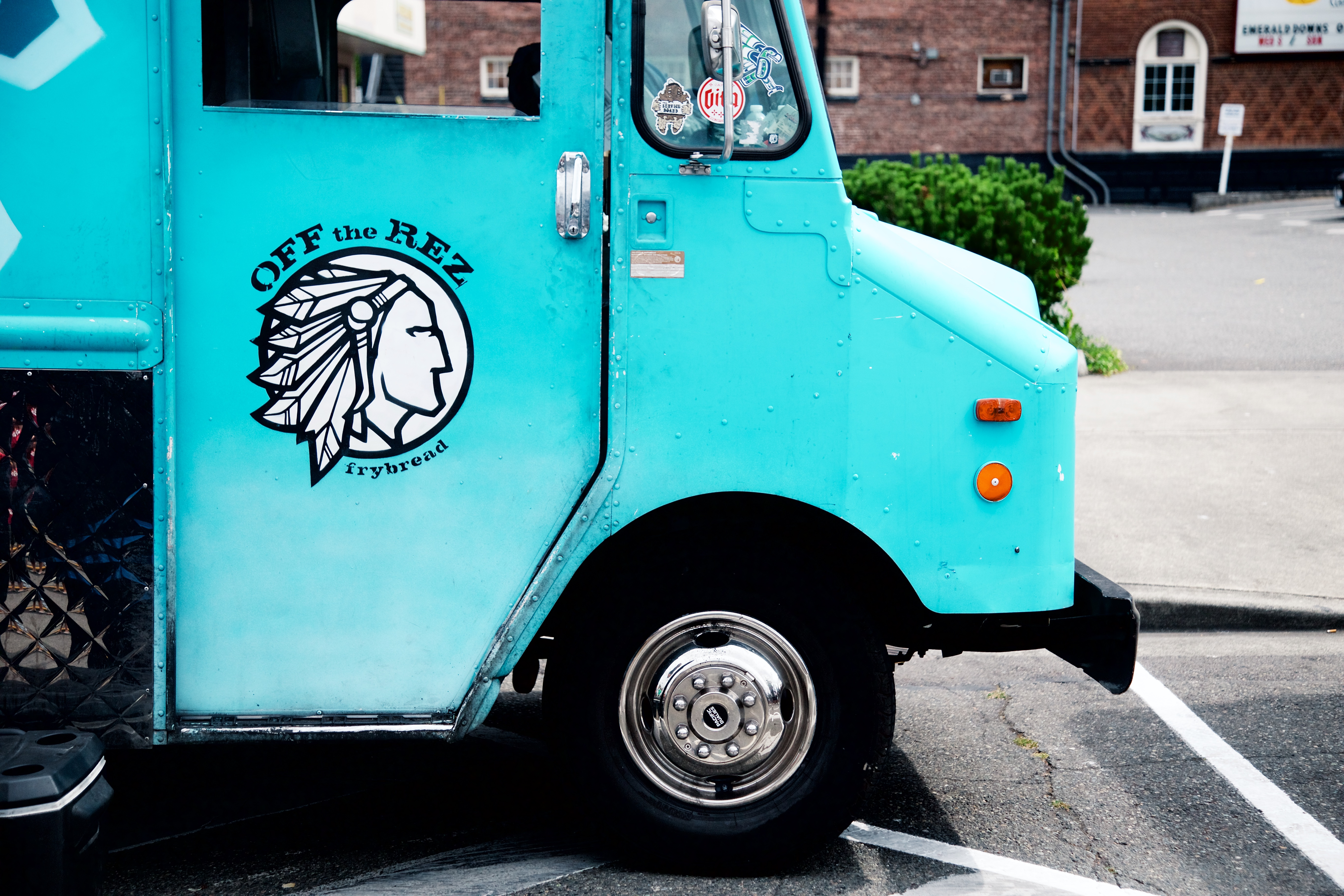
Food truck, 2016

Off the Rez is a restaurant and catering company serving indigenous cuisine of the Americas. Hannah Saunders of the Snoqualmie Valley Record has described the business as "Seattle's first Native food truck that also offers catering and a cafe". In 2022, Sabra Boyd of Eater Seattle described Off the Rez as the city's "best-known Indigenous restaurant", offering "hyper-seasonal plates, with produce, fish, and bison sourced from tribal vendors whenever possible". The menu has included bison fry bread tacos (with barbecue pulled pork, braised bison, or chili as toppings), wild rice bowls with braised bison, and other pre-Columbian foods "to provide a fuller scope of Native American cuisine".

== History ==
Off the Rez began operating as a food truck in 2011. The business expanded to the Burke Museum on the campus of the University of Washington in the city's University District in 2019. The cafe seats approximately 30 people.

== Reception ==
Off the Rez was included in The Infatuation's 2025 list of the best restaurants and bars in the University District.

== See also ==
- List of food trucks
