= Jojo (restaurant) =

Restaurant in Portland, Oregon, U.S.

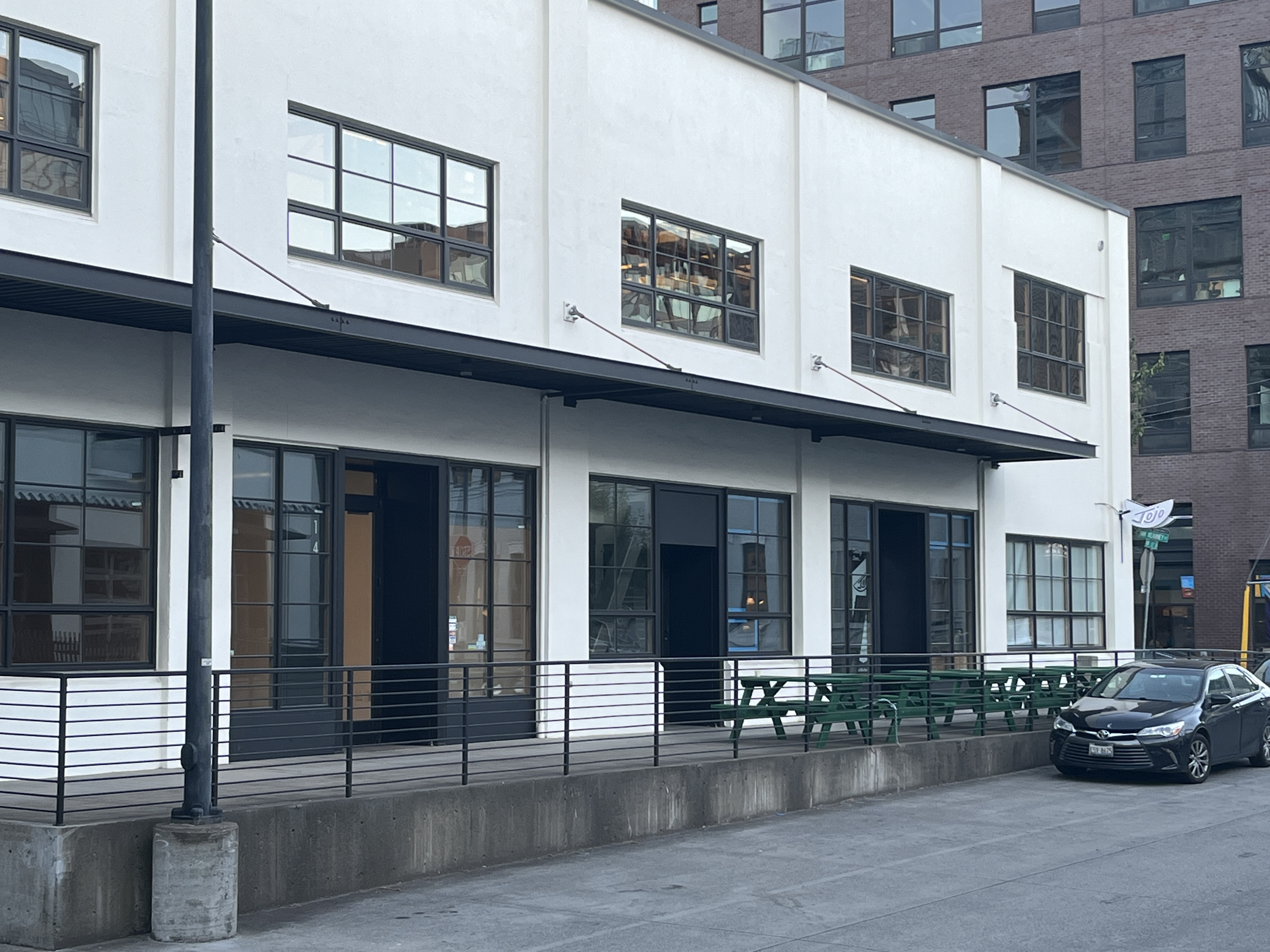
- Exterior of the Pearl District location, 2022
- Interactive map of Jojo

Restaurant information
- Owner: Justin Hintze
- Location: Portland, Oregon, United States
- Coordinates: 45.4965°N 122.6268°W
- Website: jojopdx.com

Jojo (also known as Jojo Food Truck and Jojo PDX) is a restaurant in Portland, Oregon. Established by Justin Hintze in 2018, the business operates in southeast Portland's Creston-Kenilworth neighborhood and northwest Portland's Pearl District.

== Description ==
Jojo operates from a food cart in southeast Portland's Creston-Kenilworth neighborhood and a brick and mortar space in northwest Portland's Pearl District. The business specializes in fried chicken sandwiches. The menu has also included biscuits and gravy and milkshakes.

== History ==
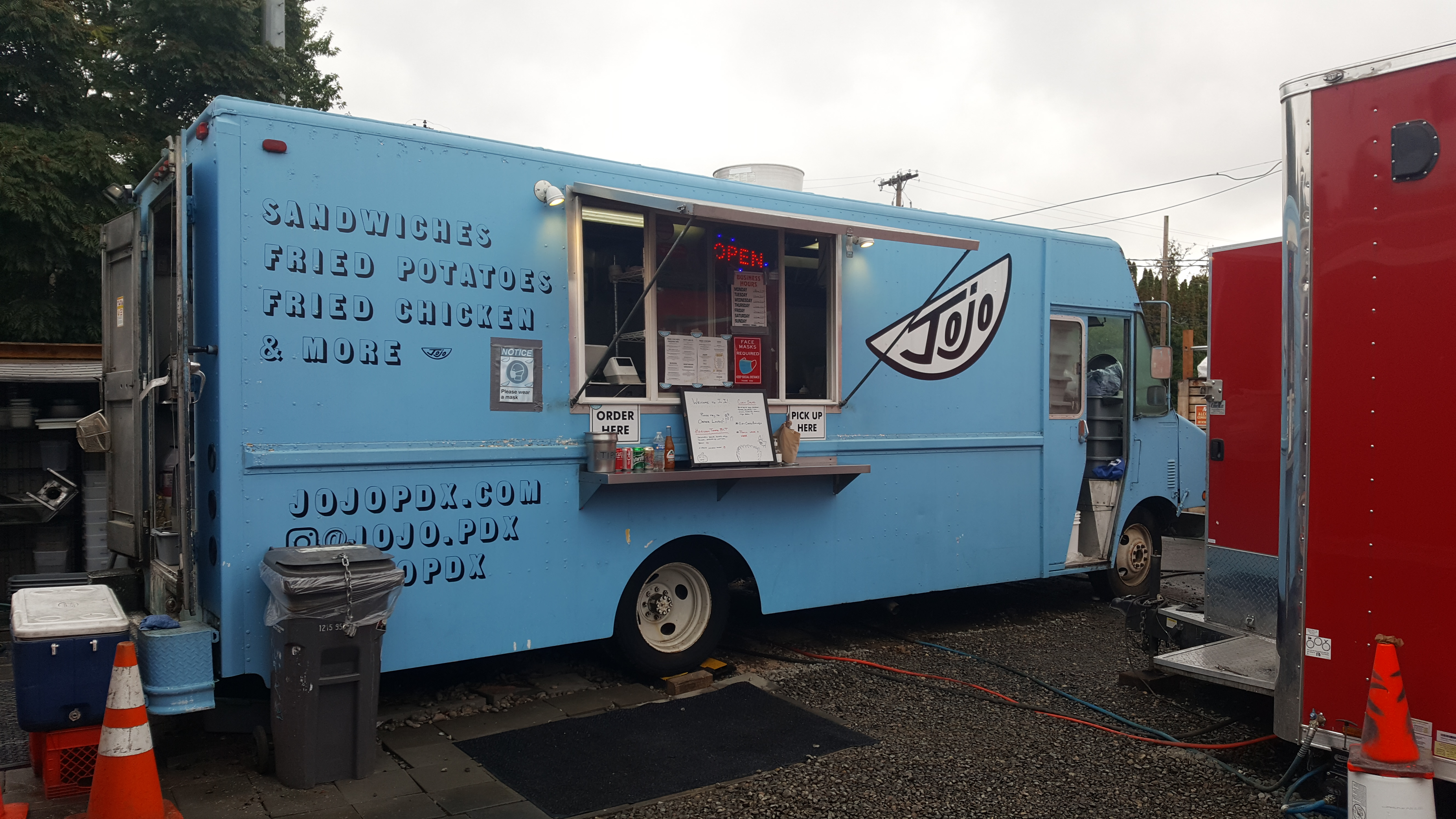
The food truck's exterior in 2021

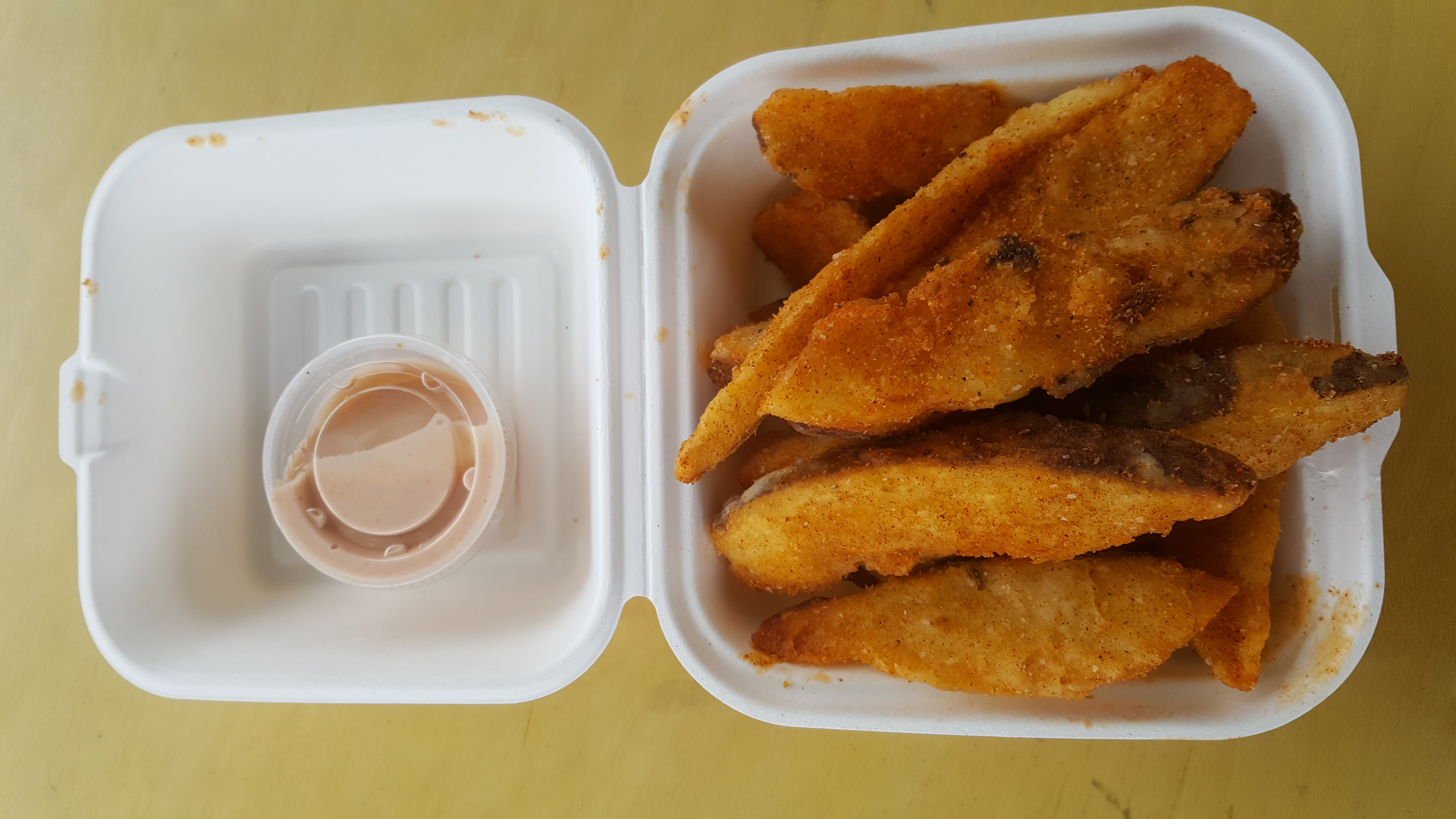
The restaurant's jojos in 2021

Justin Hintze, a former real estate agent, opened Jojo in Sellwood in October 2018. The food cart relocated to a pod on Southwest Powell in 2019. Jojo became known for its social media posts in 2019. In late 2019, Jojo and Vietnamese cart Matta collaborated to launch Chơi Luôn, a restaurant within the cocktail bar Lulu.

In 2020, during the COVID-19 pandemic, Jojo offered free meals to children, restaurant workers, and hospital workers. In April, when Jojo reopened after a temporary closure, the business offered free sandwiches to all who asked.

In 2021, Hintze confirmed plans to open a sibling brick and mortar restaurant in the Pearl District. The restaurant opened on September 15, 2022. Jojo also caters large events.

== Reception ==
In 2019, Jojo was a Food Cart of the Year finalist in Eater Portland's Eater Awards. The website's Brooke Jackson-Glidden wrote, "Jojo stands out as a Portland icon for its social media alone, but luckily this Creston-Kenilworth cart’s hulking fried chicken sandwiches are similarly obsession-inducing. Owner Justin Hintze doesn’t hold back with spice, sauce, or smoke, topping chicken with potato salad and sambal mayo on a crisped bun, with a side of crispy-crackly jojos for gut-busting good measure."

In 2020, Nick Woo and Alex Frane included Jojo in the website's lists of 14 "outstanding" fried chicken sandwiches in the city and 14 "excellent" sandwich shops in Portland, respectively. Jojo was included in several Eater Portland lists in 2021, including Woo and Nick Townsend's 14 "real-deal" fried chicken restaurants in Portland, Krista Garcia's 10 "chicken-and-jojo champs" in the city, Woo and Jackson-Glidden's 15 "outstanding" food carts in Portland, Daniel Barnett and Garcia's 17 "mind-blowing" burgers in the metropolitan area, and Jackson-Glidden's 38 "essential" Portland restaurants and food carts. In 2023, Nathan Williams included Jojo in an overview of recommended eateries in the Creston-Kenilworth neighborhood, and Waz Wu included the business in an overview of "top-notch" vegan Burgers in the city. Jojo was included in the website's 2025 lists of Portland's best brunch restaurants and best eateries in the Pearl District.

Portland Monthly included Jojo in a 2021 overview of "The Best Fried Chicken in Portland". Jojo won in the Best Food Cart and Beast Local Instagram Account categories of Willamette Week's annual 'Best of Portland' readers' poll in 2022. Michael Russell included the restaurant in The Oregonian's 2023 list of Portland's ten best new brunches. In 2025, Jojo ranked number 31 in a Yelp list of 50 restaurants serving the best fried chicken in the U.S. and Canada.

== See also ==
- List of food trucks
