= Don Chow Tacos =

Chinese-Mexican fusion food truck based in Los Angeles

- Food truck

Restaurant information
- Established: 2009
- Food type: Chinese-Mexican
- Location: California, U.S.

Don Chow Tacos was a Chinese-Mexican fusion food truck based in Los Angeles, California. It was founded on April 22, 2009, by Dominic Lau and Lawrence Lie with the motto, "Where Chino meets Latino", representing their Chinese heritage and Hispanic influences. Don Chow Tacos ceased operations on February 16, 2015.

== History ==
Don Chow Tacos was founded in October 2009. The idea was conceived when owners Lau and Lie identified a niche in the late-night bar-goer crowd. When they launched, the food truck industry was in its early stages. Don Chow began as a two-man operation, with Lau and Lie cooking and serving bar crowds. They appeared regularly at Zanzibar in Santa Monica and Townhouse in Venice. Both kept their day jobs.

When the truck transitioned to a full-week schedule in October 2009, Ernie Gallegos was hired and Don Chow was able to establish regular operations. The food truck gained local popularity after Guy Fieri sampled their food on Diners, Drive-Ins and Dives in 2010 and again in 2015. Earlier that year, Don Chow had been recognized on NBC's Food Truck Week on the truck's first birthday: April 22, 2010, and Dominic Lau was interviewed by Kurt Knutsson, "Cyberguy" for KTLA in May. As its popularity continued to grow, Don Chow was featured on a segment for National Taco Day on KTLA on October 4, 2010.

Don Chow Tacos and owner Lau were featured on the Cooking Channel show "Easy Chinese" hosted by Ching-He Huang in June 2012.

In July 2013, Don Chow Tacos' owner participated Lau on the Lifetime Network's reality competition show Supermarket Superstar.

== Cuisine ==
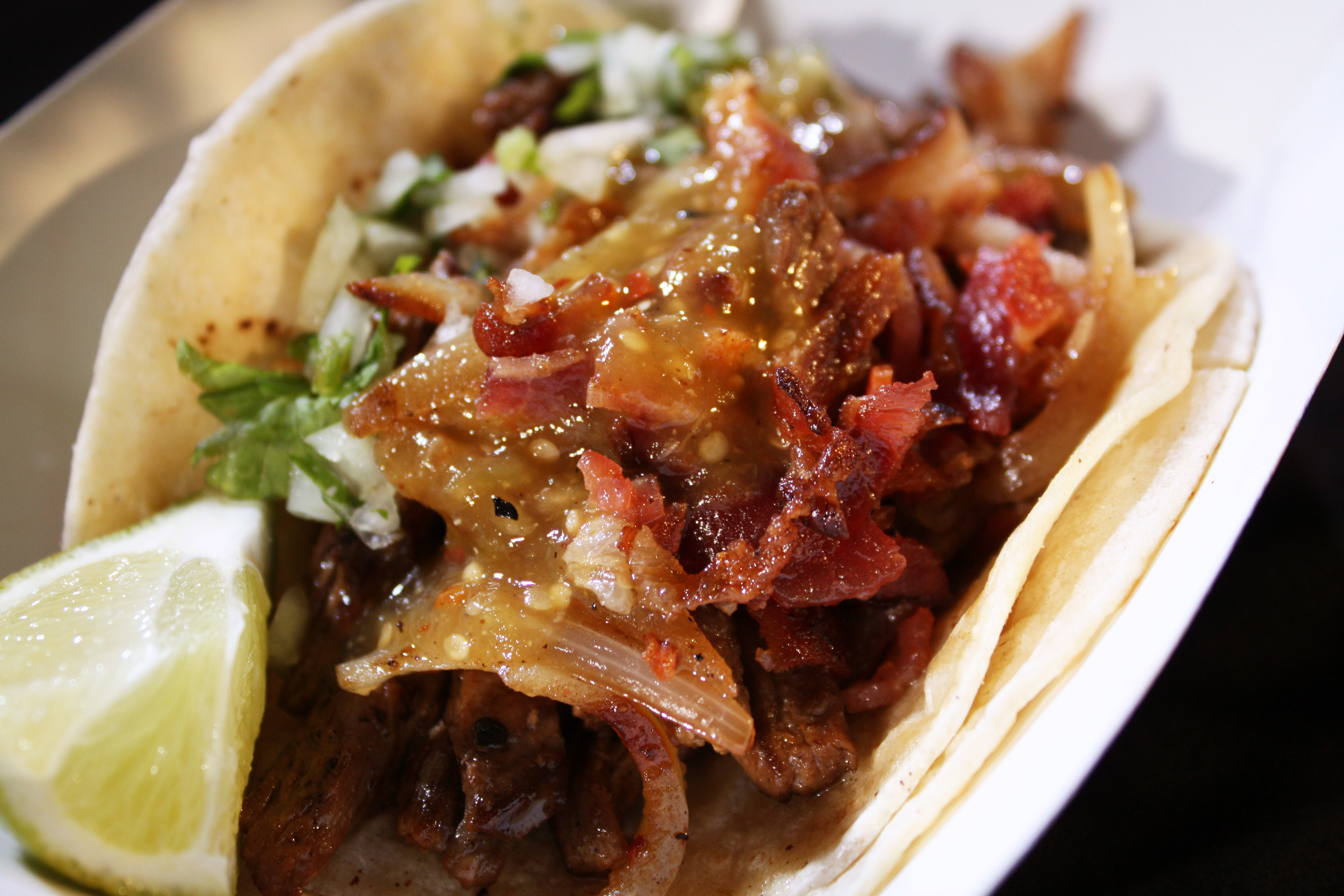
Don Chow Tacos' taco

The Don Chow truck served traditional Mexican food with Chinese flavors from Lau and Lie's family and friends' recipes. The menu includes tacos, burritos, tortas, "Chimales", and noodle dishes.

== Events ==
The truck made regular appearances at the Los Angeles Outdoor Cinema Food Fest, the LA Street Food Fest, and farmers' markets.

Don Chow made an appearance at Cal State Northridge's "Big Show" in 2009 and 2010. In September 2010, Don Chow participated in the Los Angeles Times Celebration of Food and Wine.

== See also ==
- Kogi Korean BBQ
- List of food trucks
