= Kogi Korean BBQ =

Fusion food trucks in Los Angeles

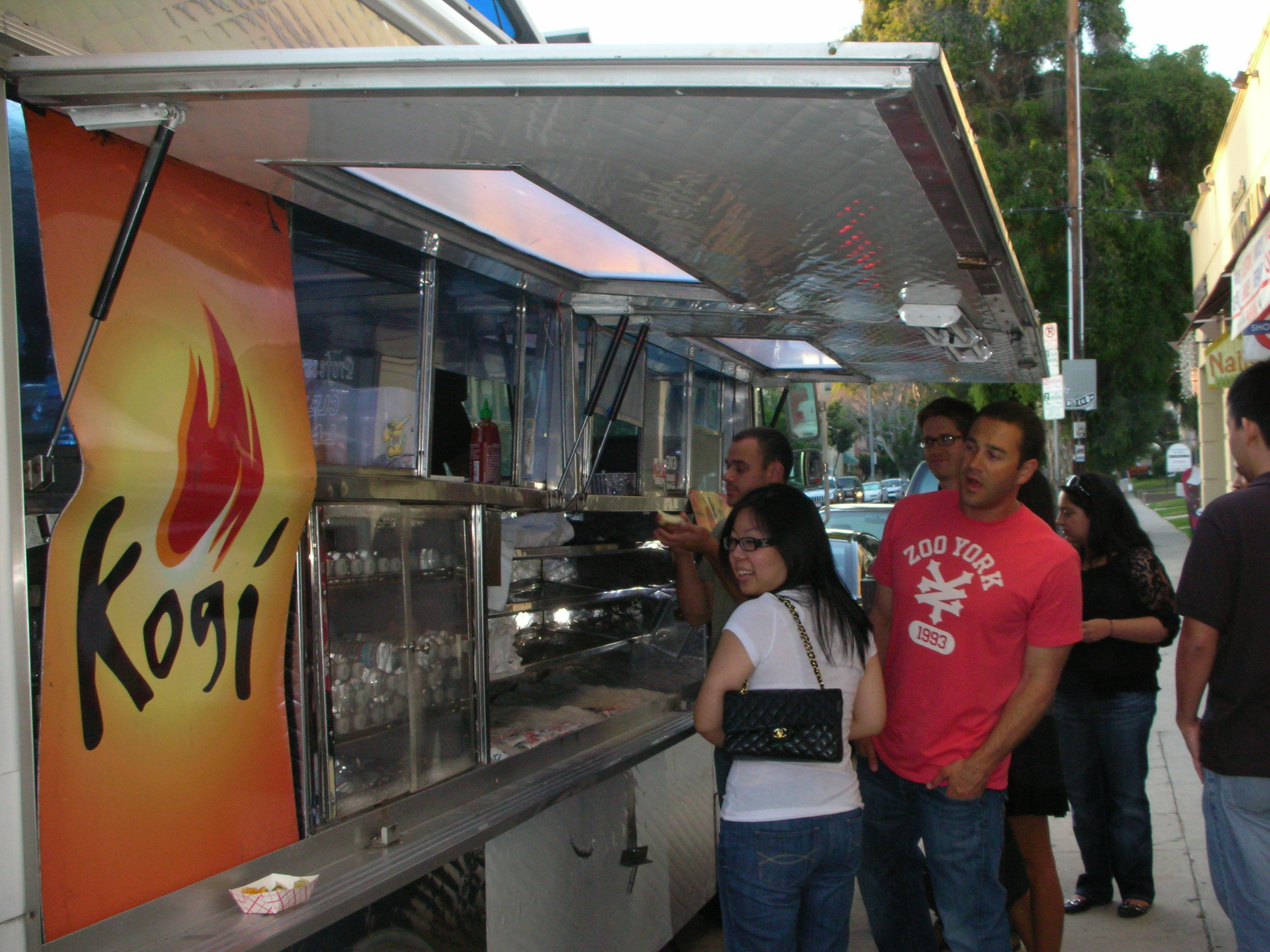
- Industry: Food trucks
- Founded: November 19, 2008; 17 years ago in Los Angeles, California, United States
- Founders: Mark Manguera; Caroline Shin
- Key people: Roy Choi (Chief chef)
- Website: kogibbq.com

Kogi Korean BBQ is a restaurant and food truck chain in Los Angeles that serves Korean-Mexican fusion cuisine. It is known for its use of social media, especially Twitter and YouTube, to spread information about locations and offerings, which include bulgogi tacos, kimchi quesadillas, and short rib sliders. Its owner/founder, Mark Manguera, a Filipino-American, married into a Korean family and was inspired to combine Mexican and Korean food as a result. The food truck has won recognitions that include a Bon Appétit Award in 2009 and "Best New Chef" for Roy Choi by Food & Wine in 2010, the first for a food truck.

== History ==
After several weeks of parking in different locations and not getting any customers, Kogi began going to clubs and giving free samples to bouncers, whose recommendations helped increase its popularity.

Kogi gained attention when it contacted food bloggers, who then wrote about Kogi. Its subsequent use of Twitter to announce its location led Newsweek to describe Kogi as "America's first viral eatery".

== Operations ==
In addition to co-founders Mark Manguera and Caroline Shin, Manguera's friend Roy Choi, a former valedictorian at the Culinary Institute of America, is the chief chef. Manguera's sister-in-law, Alice Shin, manages the business's social media accounts and informs customers of the trucks' locations. The name, logo, decision to use Twitter, and social media strategy came from consultant Mike Prasad, who is a best friend of Caroline Shin's brother Eric, who is Kogi Lunch Manager and a photographer.

Kogi initially had no fixed location, operating entirely from a truck driven around the city and parked for a few hours in different locations, with some preparation done at a home base in Culver City, California. Its fan base has been built up through the use of the Internet and cell phones to promote an online "Kogi Kulture". By mid-2009 it had 36,000 Twitter followers, and its first fixed location in the Alibi Room, a local lounge. By mid-2011, Kogi had expanded to five trucks.

In 2010, the creators of Kogi opened two sister restaurants serving Korean inspired food. The restaurant Chego, with a primary focus on bowls, opened on April 7, 2010. Another restaurant and full bar, The A-Frame, was created from a former IHOP and modeled around the sloped architecture; it opened on November 4, 2010.

Kogi also opened a stationary location, stylized like a food truck, within the secured area at Terminal 4 of Los Angeles International Airport in December 2014. In November 2015, Kogi quietly left LAX and handed the food truck in the terminal over to Border Grill, another locally owned restaurant. The change is a part of the airport's plan to have a different vendor occupy the food truck every few months.

=== Kogi Taqueria ===
In April 2016, Kogi opened their first brick-and-mortar location in Palms, Los Angeles. Called Kogi Taqueria, the new operation carried all of the favorites from the food truck menu, some favorites from their Alibi Room, and some Mexican-American standards such as carne asada, carnitas, and pollo asada. The restaurant was designed to look like a garage that houses the food trucks when they are not on the road.

In November 2016, a second location was opened inside a Whole Foods Market in El Segundo.

== Reception ==
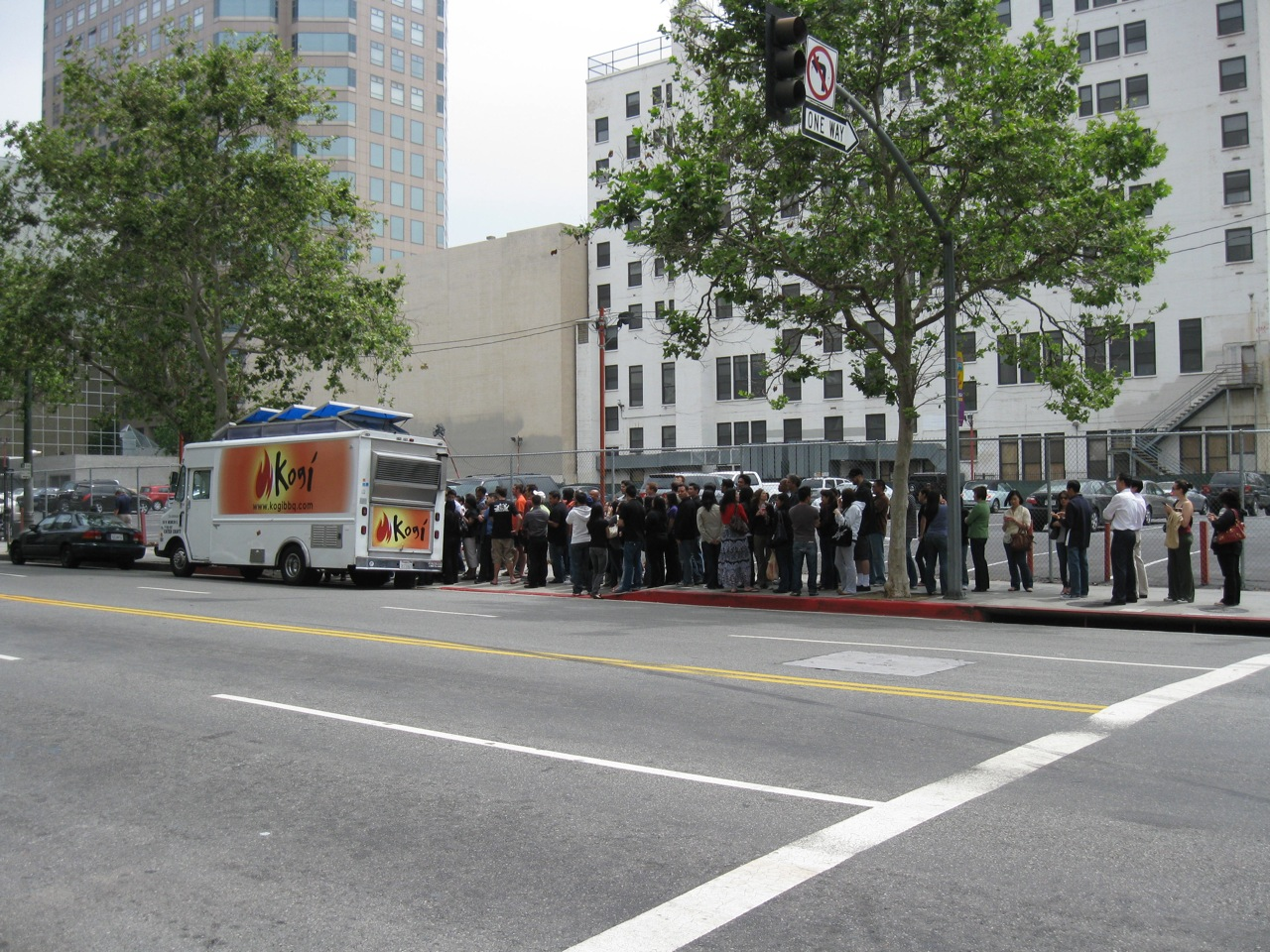
A line forms for the Kogi truck

Part of the reason for Kogi's success is its food, which has been described as "high-concept" and "creative". According to The New York Times, "The food at Kogi Korean BBQ-To-Go, the taco vendor that has overtaken Los Angeles, does not fit into any known culinary category."

Kogi's mobility, which causes customers to travel to the truck's location, has been praised for its social aspect. According to the Los Angeles Times, "The truck and its staff of merry makers have become a sort of roving party, bringing people to neighborhoods they might not normally go to, and allowing for interactions with strangers they might not otherwise talk to."

== In popular culture ==
Kogi was the inspiration for the title of a jazz song by artist Jacob Mann released on December 9, 2016.

== See also ==
- Don Chow Tacos
- List of food trucks
