= Philadelphia Mobile Food Association =

The Philadelphia Mobile Food Association is a trade association representing local mobile food vending businesses in Philadelphia.

== History ==
Co-founders Dan Pennachietti and Andrew Gerson started the Philadelphia Mobile Food Association (PMFA) to provide organizational, legal, and advertising support to food truck owners operating in the Philadelphia area. Through a communal approach, the organization's greatest ambition is to construct a strong voice when working with regulations established by Philadelphia's departments of Licenses & Inspections and Health.

With financial assistance from the Wharton School of the University of Pennsylvania, the association began in January and February 2012. Within eight months of its emanation, PMFA already had 73 members.

== Membership ==
In order to join, interested food truck owners must pay a membership fee ranging from $150–$500. Additionally, a prospective member must operate a food truck, be interested in owning a food truck, or be involved in the business of assisting mobile food operators.

== See also ==
- New York Food Truck Association
