= Bud the Spud (chip truck) =

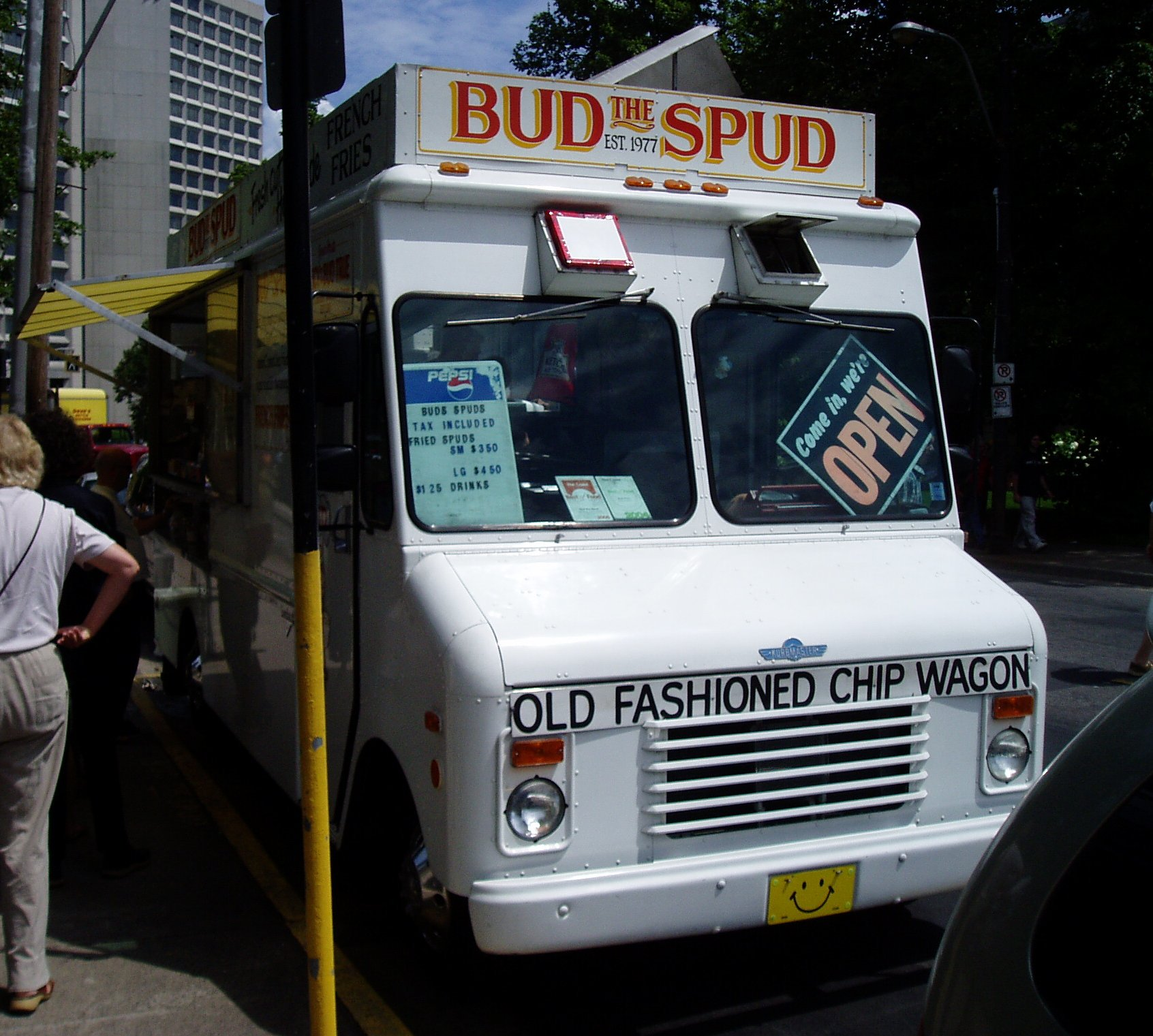
- Bud the Spud on Spring Garden Road

Restaurant information
- Established: 1977
- Owners: Kyle Conrod, Kathleen Porter
- Previous owner: Jody LeBlanc
- Food type: French fries
- Location: Halifax, Canada

Bud the Spud is an iconic chip truck in Halifax, Nova Scotia, Canada. In operation since 1977, it is parked outside the Spring Garden Road branch of the Halifax Public Libraries each summer until 2024 when another food vendor won the spot with a higher bid. The edge of the old library is marked by a low concrete wall, and it is there that most customers sit and eat their fries. The truck sells hand-cut French fries made from Prince Edward Island potatoes. It currently offers French fries, fish and chips, hot dogs, poutine, and drinks.

The truck was operated by Bud and Nancy True until 2010. The business operates only during the summer months; the Trues spent the rest of the year travelling. In early 2009 the Trues decided to retire and sell the business. Due to the economic downturn, buyers for the business were unable to obtain financing, and the truck was operated by the Trues for another summer. It was purchased in 2010 by Glenn Tait. He operated the truck until 2015 when it was purchased by Jody LeBlanc who left his job as an instructor at a career college to run the food truck without any prior experience in the food business. The truck was purchased in 2021 by Kyle Conrod and Kathleen Porter.

Food critic Calvin Trillin, who summers in Nova Scotia, praised the truck in the New Yorker writing that "some summers, I would catch myself concocting an unlikely errand in Halifax, an hour and three-quarters from where I live, just to get within striking distance of Bud the Spud."
