= New York Food Truck Association =

Trade association in New York, United States

NYFTA
- New York Food Truck Association
- Location: New York

NYFTA, or the New York Food Truck Association, is a trade association representing local mobile food vending businesses in New York, United States.

== Background ==
The association was established in 2016 by Ben Goldberg and operates across New York City and the Metropolitan area.

The Association organizes and hosts food festivals, such as NYC Food Truck Fest, which was held in April 2017, and similar events in April 2018 and 2019.

In April 2017, in collaboration with several food and beverage companies, the New York Food Truck Association started Frontline Food Trucks, a campaign which aimed to distribute free coffee, snacks, and meals to hospital and front line workers during NYC's fight against the COVID-19 pandemic.

They parked food trucks in front of medical facilities across the city, including NYU Langone and Mount Sinai to support frontline medical staff in New York and local food truck businesses which had been shut down due to the pandemic.

== See also ==
- Philadelphia Mobile Food Association
