= Roaming Hunger =

American food truck booking platform

- Industry: Catering, Food Trucks, Advertising/Promotions
- Founded: 2009; 17 years ago in Santa Monica, California
- Founder: Ross Resnick
- Headquarters: West Hollywood, California, United States
- Key people: Greg Liberman (CEO)
- Services: Connecting food trucks with consumers for public and private events; promotions/takeovers; app available on iOS and Android
- Number of employees: 35
- Website: roaminghunger.com

Roaming Hunger is a food truck booking service that allows people to find food trucks in real time, book trucks for upcoming events, and engage food trucks for advertising and promotional purposes. It was founded in 2009 by Ross Resnick.

== History ==
During a study abroad program in 2004 while attending University of Southern California, Ross Resnick became immersed in Asian street food culture. Upon his return, Resnick began developing Roaming Hunger originally as the food truck industry started to emerge in 2009. Resnick took it on himself to compile an online directory of food trucks and carts across the US. Resnick did not initially have a business model. As people began to seek his help to book trucks for events, and marketing campaigns, Resnick realized that he could turn his online directory into a business.

As of June 2015, Roaming Hunger operates out of West Hollywood with 35 employees.

In 2024 a new CEO was appointed by shareholder Shore Capital; Greg Liberman

== Divisions ==
Roaming Hunger is split into four divisions: Corporate Catering, Public/Private Catering (which includes weddings and receptions), Takeovers/Promotions and Marketplace designed to sell and lease food trucks.

== Developments ==
=== Website ===
Roaming Hunger’s website displays real-time maps showing current locations of food trucks in many major cities and areas, based on the schedules vendors themselves enter by registering on the site, or by data automatically interpreted from a vendor’s tweets. Each truck, trailer, and cart on the site has a profile with a picture, short description, and the option for the vendor to upload menus, descriptions, and pictures of the food. It also offers search functions to find vendors in an area, vendors serving specific types of food, or a specific truck, trailer, or cart. Website users may “love” and review a truck, find the top trucks in their area, set an alert to notify them when a favorite truck is serving in their area, and read articles on the Roaming Hunger blog about vendors, food truck events, and food recipes. They may also suggest new trucks to the site, and submit catering requests.

=== App ===
Roaming Hunger's app launched in June 2011 for iOS and November 2014 for Android, offers the same live maps as the website, as well as functionality to favorite vendors, view menus and photos, and read about each vendor.

Roaming Hunger also offers a vendor app, for the vendors on their site to enter their service locations, schedule future services, and tweet to their followers.
