= Slapfish =

Seafood restaurant chain in the US

Coordinates: 35°10′32.1″N 106°34′30.7″W

- Type: Private
- Industry: Restaurants
- Founded: 2011
- Founder: Andrew Gruel
- Headquarters: Huntington Beach, CA
- Number of locations: 5
- Area served: Southwestern United States
- Products: Seafood, tacos, burritos, sandwiches, clam chowder
- Website: slapfishrestaurant.com

Slapfish is a fast casual seafood restaurant chain founded by Andrew Gruel now owned by Mac Haik Enterprises, Ltd. As of 2026, there were 5 locations, with 4 of them being in Indiana around Indianapolis, and the remaining one in California at LAX Airport.

== History ==
In May 2011, American chef Andrew Gruel founded Slapfish with a retrofitted food truck selling seafood from California and lobster from Maine. Within three months he had three food trucks in Los Angeles and Orange County.

Working directly with fishing boats to create a supply chain for seafood led to the restaurant concept. In early 2012, he raised money from family and friends to convert an old bagel shop in Huntington Beach into Slapfish's first brick-and-mortar restaurant, serving fast casual seafood. The menu has expanded significantly since its beginnings as a food truck selling three items. Slapfish serves only sustainable seafood, with a commitment certified by the Marine Stewardship Council, an organization that measures the level of seafood stocks.

As of 2017, there are seven Slapfish locations in Southern California, two company-owned and five franchised. The Lehi, Utah, location was the first outside of California, opening in March 2017, with a second Utah location opened in November 2017. In October 2017, a new franchise was opened in Albuquerque, New Mexico. In December 2017, Slapfish announced plans to open Raw Bar by Slapfish, which will serve chilled seafood and oysters next door to the flagship location in Huntington Beach. The company has also announced plans to open restaurants in Florida, the United Kingdom and South Korea.

In July 2019, they debuted their first location in the Midwest, opening a franchise in Noblesville, Indiana.

In 2022, the company was sold to Mac Haik Enterprises, Ltd. and by January 2025 closed its last Orange County, CA location.

== Format ==
Slapfish has been described as "the Chipotle of seafood." The store concept of a self-described "modern seafood shack" is based on seafood huts typically found in Southern California and Mexico.

== Locations ==
=== United States ===
- Los Angeles, California
- Noblesville, Indiana
- Fishers, Indiana
- Indianapolis, Indiana
- Carmel, Indiana

== See also ==
- List of seafood restaurants
- Fast casual restaurant
