= Andrew Gruel =

American chef, television personality, and politician

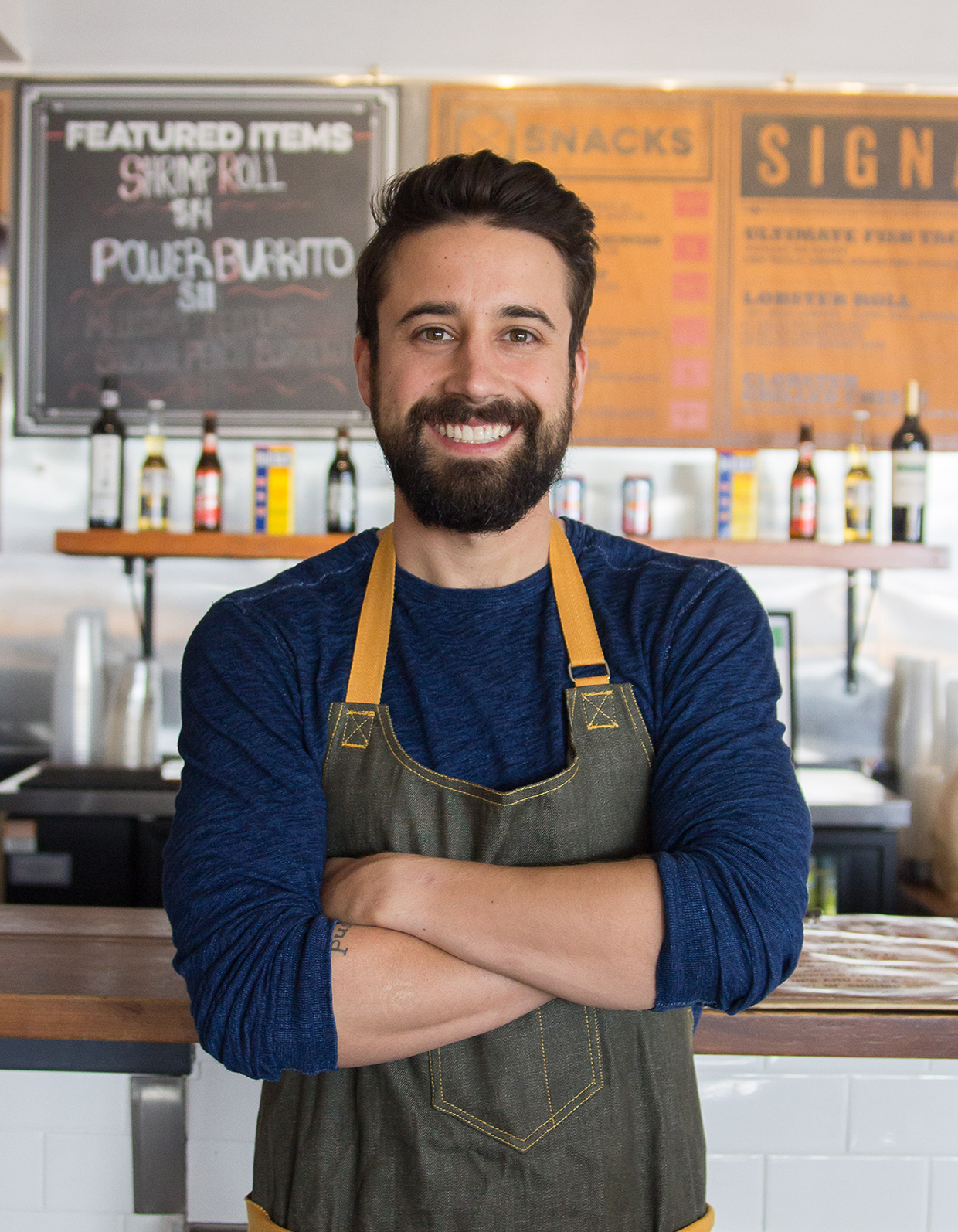
- Gruel in 2016
- Born: July 12, 1980 (age 46); Bridgewater, New Jersey
- Education: Bates College; Johnson & Wales University
- Spouse: Lauren Gruel (m. 2013)
- Children: 4
- Culinary career
- Cooking style: Seafood, chicken, vegan
- Current restaurants
- Big Parm; Two Birds; Butterleaf; Calico Fish House

Member of the Huntington Beach City Council for the at-large district
- Incumbent
- Assumed office March 18, 2025
- Preceded by: Tony Strickland

Personal details
- Party: Republican
- Website: chefgruel.com

Andrew Gruel (born July 12, 1980) is an American chef, television personality, and politician based in Orange County, California. He appeared as a judge on Food Network's Food Truck Face Off and as a host of FYI's Say It to My Face!, and is the founder of Slapfish, a seafood restaurant franchise that he launched in 2012 and sold to Mac Haik Enterprises in 2022. He is the founder, CEO and executive chef of Calico Fish House, a casual seafood restaurant in Huntington Beach, California. He has been a member of the Huntington Beach City Council since March 18, 2025, when he was appointed to fill a vacant seat on the council.

== Early life and education ==
Gruel was born and raised in Bridgewater, New Jersey, and graduated from the Pingry School in 1998. He said that his affinity towards cooking started at an early age, when he would fake sick to stay home from school and watch cooking shows on public-access television. While attending Bates College in Lewiston, Maine, he worked in lobster restaurants in the area. He received his culinary degree from Johnson & Wales University's College of Culinary Arts.

== Career ==
=== Cooking ===
Gruel began his career working in fine dining restaurants, hotels and diners in New Jersey, as a cook at the Ritz Carlton in Boston and at Jack's of New London in New London, New Hampshire. He left the East Coast in 2009 to work as director of Seafood for the Future, a nonprofit program at the Aquarium of the Pacific in Long Beach, California.

After the COVID-19 pandemic forced many restaurants to shut down, Gruel started a fund in December 2020 to raise money for out-of-work restaurant industry employees, raising over $230,000 in the first three weeks. The fund, called 86 Restaurant Struggle, is a nonprofit charity that helps struggling and unemployed restaurant workers.

=== Television ===
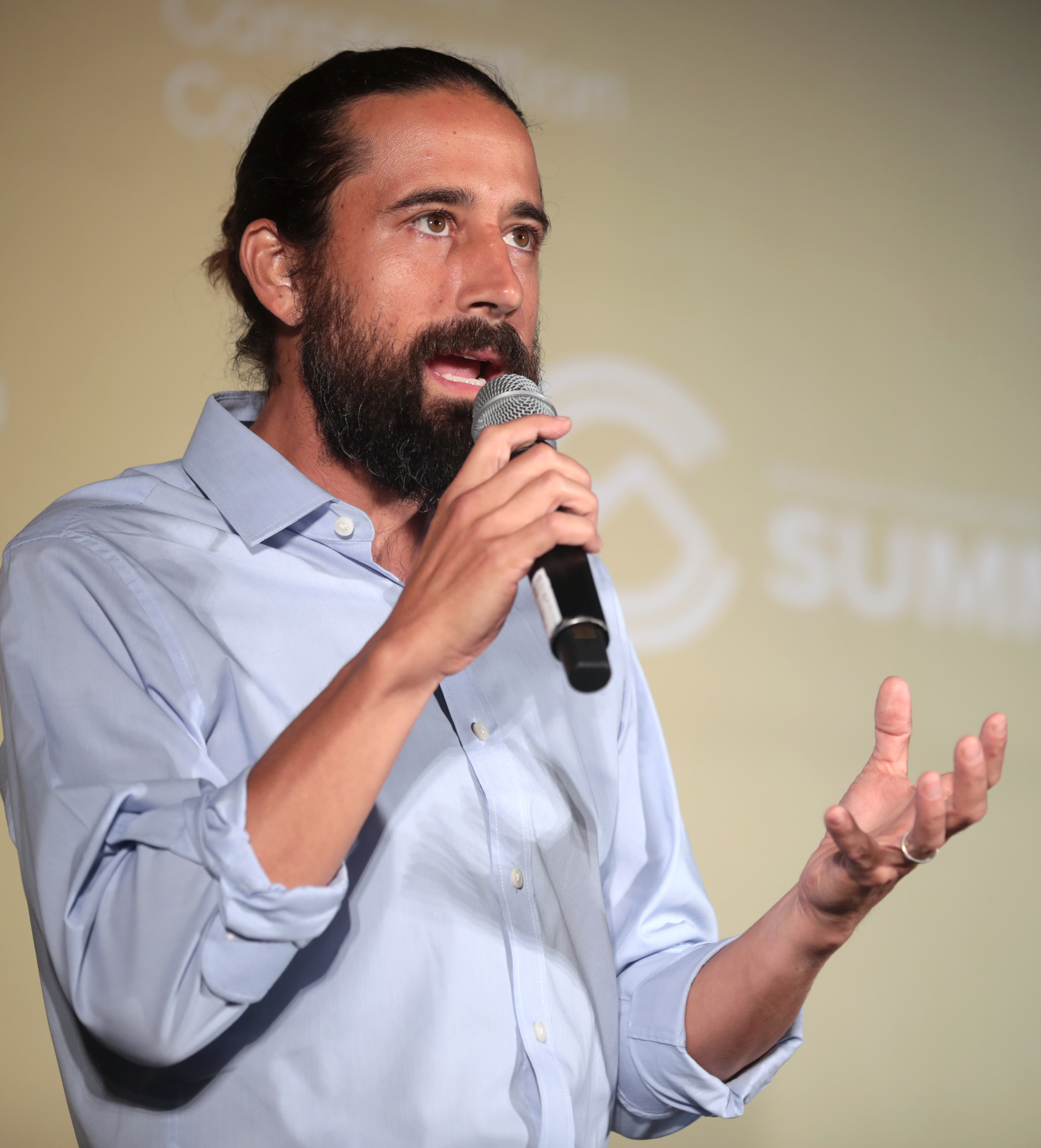
Gruel speaking at an event in June 2022

Gruel's first television appearance was on the BBC show The Endless Feast in 2007. He served as a judge on the Food Channel's Food Truck Face Off and Chopped Junior, and also appeared on Eat St. on the Cooking Channel, Today on NBC, and On the Rocks on the Food Network. In 2015, Gruel starred as a host on season one of the reality television show Say It To My Face!' along with Chef Anthony Dispensa. Since 2020, he has been a frequent guest on various national news programs.

=== Radio ===
Gruel hosted a culinary radio show called Cooking with Gruel in 2015. He co-hosts the weekly The SoCal Restaurant Show on KLAA, which launched in 2012.

=== City council ===
On March 18, 2025, Gruel was appointed to fill a vacant seat on the Huntington Beach City Council that was previously held by Tony Strickland, who was elected to the California State Senate.

== Television appearances ==
Year	Series	Network	Notes
2007	The Endless Feast	BBC	Guest
2012	Eat St.	Cooking Channel	Guest
2013	On the Rocks	Food Network	Consulting chef
2014	Food Truck Face Off	Food Network	Judge (season 1, 5 episodes)
2014	Today	NBC	Guest
2015	Say It To My Face!	FYI	Host (season 1, 15 episodes)
2016	Chopped Junior	Food Network	Guest (season 3, episode 3)
2016-20	Home & Family	Hallmark Channel	Guest (8 episodes)
2020	Food Paradise	Food Network	Guest
2020	The Issue Is	Fox	Guest
2020	Justice with Judge Jeanine	Fox News	Guest
2020	The Ingraham Angle	Fox News	Guest
2020–21	Fox & Friends	Fox News	Guest (3 episodes)
2020–22	Tucker Carlson Tonight	Fox News	Guest (3 episodes)
2021–present	The Chris Salcedo Show	Newsmax TV	Guest
2021–present	Fox & Friends First	Fox News	Guest
2021–present	Gutfeld	Fox	Guest often
2021–present	NBC Nightly News	NBC	Guest
2022	Jesse Watters Primetime	Fox News	Guest (8 episodes)

== Personal life ==
Gruel and his wife Lauren Gruel have four children.
