= Late Night in the Studio =

Comedy anthology series

Late Night in the Studio (titled on-screen as CBC Late Night in the Studio) is a Canadian comedy anthology web series produced for the CBC Gem streaming service.

The series is presented as a retrospective look at (non-existent) CBC Television programs of the past. Each episode runs 9 to 13 minutes, and is introduced by Nobu Adilman, who portrays the head archivist of the CBC.

The Globe and Mail's television critic John Doyle said the series was "highly recommended; satire as strange as what we need right now".

== Episodes ==
No.	Title	Original release date
1	"Young Suzuki"	June 26, 2020
An episode of a 1980s action-adventure series, The Adventures of Young Suzuki, following the adventures of a young David Suzuki, narrated by the real Suzuki as an adult.
2	"Dougie Doughnuthole"	June 26, 2020
An early-2000s stop-motion animated short featuring an anthropomorphic doughnut hole and his friends and family. The host explains the short was originally produced as branded content, but the deal was cancelled, so all of the branding had to be excised, and references to the title character were dubbed over. At one point, the presumed original title is almost fully seen as "Timmy Tim[bit]".
3	"My Regina"	June 26, 2020
A 1980s soap opera set in Regina, Saskatchewan, apparently based on The Young and the Restless.
4	"Mr. Bright-Bright"	June 26, 2020
A 1970s educational show for children.
5	"There Will Be Jolly"	June 26, 2020
A 1960s animated Christmas television special.
