= The Outhouse =

- Created by: Peace Point Entertainment Group
- Starring: Brad Goddard & Chris Goddard
- Country of origin: Canada
- Original language: English
- No. of episodes: 6

Production
- Executive producer: Les Tomlin
- Camera setup: MiniDV

Original release
- Network: OLN
- Release: 2003

The Outhouse was a Canadian television series that aired on OLN in Canada and in Australia on Foxtel. It was a one-hour home improvement show hosted by identical twins Brad Goddard and Chris Goddard and produced by Peace Point Entertainment Group. The creator is Vallery Hyduk and the director is Daniel Oron. It tried to separate itself from other home improvement shows by offering a more slapstick, humorous take on the genre.

The Outhouse won Bronze honours at WorldFest in Houston for Best Reality Based Programme.

The premise of the show was to revitalize the exterior of the two "crappiest looking houses" on the block in two days with a fixed budget. The twins placed usually humiliating side bets as to which of the two houses (and therefore which of the two hosts) would win. The Most Improved Crapper was voted by neighbourhood ballot at a Steam Whistle Brewing keg party held to celebrate the completion of the transformations.
