= FANatical =

The logo of the show seen during the opening credits

Fanatical is a Canadian half-hour documentary television series produced by Peace Point Entertainment Group and currently airs on TVtropolis and DejaView. FANatical explores the motivations and activities of people involved with the fandom of various television series. The episode dealing with I Dream of Jeannie featured writer/composer/fan Stephen Dolginoff, writer of the musical Thrill Me meeting Barbara Eden.

== Episode Information ==
Episode	OriginalAir Date	Subject
1	September 19, 2006	Batman
2	September 26, 2006	The Dukes of Hazzard
3	October 3, 2006	Queer as Folk
4	October 10, 2006	Bewitched
5	November 14, 2006	Buffy the Vampire Slayer
6	November 21, 2006	I Love Lucy
7	November 28, 2006	Gilligan's Island
8	December 5, 2006	The Flintstones
9	January 30, 2007	The Simpsons
10	February 13, 2007	The Transformers
11	February 20, 2007	Xena: Warrior Princess
12	March 6, 2007	Wonder Woman
13	March 13, 2007	Charlie's Angels
14	March 20, 2007	He-Man and the Masters of the Universe and She-Ra: Princess of Power
15	March 27, 2007	Knight Rider
16	April 3, 2007	The Munsters
17	April 10, 2007	The A-Team
18	April 17, 2007	Star Trek: The Next Generation
19	April 24, 2007	Star Trek
20	May 1, 2007	Teenage Mutant Ninja Turtles
21	May 8, 2007	G.I. Joe: A Real American Hero
22	May 15, 2007	Dallas
23	June 12, 2007	The Incredible Hulk
24	June 19, 2007	The Monkees
25	June 26, 2007	I Dream of Jeannie
26	July 3, 2007	Stargate SG-1
