= Peace Point Entertainment Group =

- Company type: Private / independent
- Industry: Television Production
- Founded: August 13, 2002
- Headquarters: Toronto, ON
- Key people: Les Tomlin, President & Executive Producer; Vallery Hyduk, Vice President; Sylvie Brownlow, Head of Production; Nicole Hamilton, Head of Development
- Products: Award-Winning Television Series, Documentaries, Websites, Webisodes, Mobisodes, Podcasts & Mobile Applications
- Website: www.peacepoint.tv

Peace Point Entertainment Group was a Canadian Toronto-based independent television production company,

with a long list of popular television series seen in Canada, United States and with extensive worldwide distribution. It acquired DIDtv, relaunching it as Peace Point Entertainment USA as part of the deal. In December 2012, Shavick Entertainment purchased Pink Triangle Press's 24.94% interest and Peace Point Entertainment Group's 15% interest in OUTtv. Peace Point Entertainment was founded in 2002 by Les Tomlin (CEO) and business partner Vallery Hyduk (Vice President). After over 15 years as a leading Canadian media company, Peace Point is no longer operating and its vast catalogue of show were sold to Boatrocker Entertainment and their television series continue to air globally. CEO Les Tomlin is pursuing other business interests and Vallery Hyduk relocated to Detroit, Michigan to pursue real estate opportunities.

Former Peace Point logo

== Past productions ==
- Best Sellers
- Barn stormers
- Bulloch Family Ranch
- Bump!
- Camp N Out
- Chimp Mommy
- Colin & Justin's Cabin Pressure
- Colin & Justin's Street Swap
- DecAIDS
- Devil's Perch
- Ed's Up!
- Escape or Die
- FANatical
- Food Jammers
- Food Truck Face Off
- Fresh with Anna Olson
- Hammer & Chew
- Invention Nation
- Keasha's Perfect Dress
- The Outhouse
- Real Fight Club
- Reality Obsessed
- Shack Attack
- Harry Hill’s TV Burp
- Hilda
- Tanlines
- Urban Nites
- When English Football Ruled Europe 2008
- Trial and Retribution X
- Bake with Anna Olson
- The Bill
- Not Going Out
- You’ve Been Framed
- Hollyoaks
- The X Factor
- Sell Me Your Style
- Crossroads
- Goodbye Mr.Chips
- Bad Girls
- Taggart
- Spitting Image
- The Durrells
- Inspired with The Durrell Family
