= Food trucks in South Korea =

Type of mobile catering vehicle

Food trucks are a newly-developing aspect of the South Korean street food scene. Some, including ice cream trucks, sell frozen or prepackaged food; others have on-board kitchens and prepare food from scratch. Sandwiches, hamburgers, french fries, and other regional fast food fare are common. In recent years, associated with the pop-up restaurant phenomenon, food trucks offering gourmet cuisine and a variety of specialties and ethnic menus have become particularly popular.

== History ==
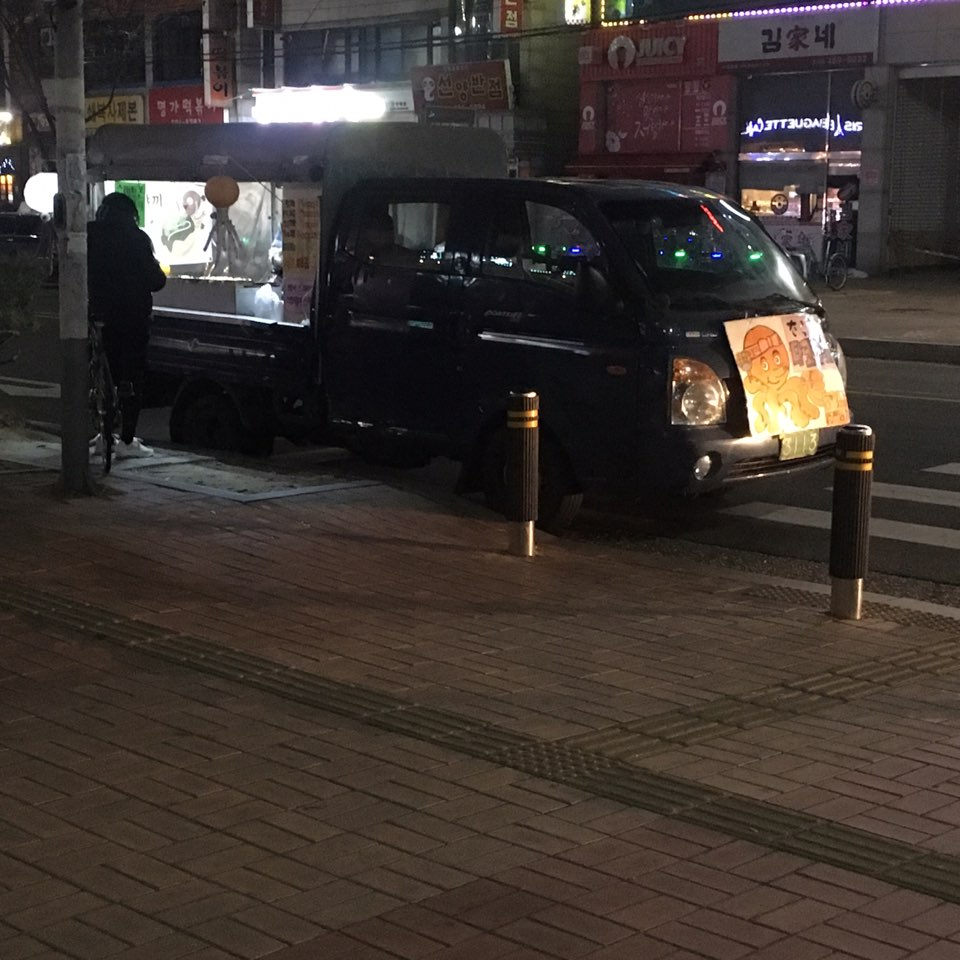

Before 2014, turning a vehicle into a food service truck was banned in South Korea over safety and sanitation concerns. The ban was lifted in August 2014 by the President of South Korea at the time, Park Geun-Hye, as part of her deregulation efforts to help revitalise South Korea's economy and create new forms of employment in the country. She stated that unnecessary business restrictions were a "lump of cancer killing our [South Korea's] body", and she aimed to reduce the number of these regulations by over 80% by 2016. Food trucks were first approved for operation in designated spaces inside amusement and public parks, and the South Korean government later expanded this to other designated spaces around sports facilities, riversides, college campuses and highway rest areas.

== Regulations ==
Food trucks in Korea must report their business to the local district office. All other food trucks are illegal, and they can be treated as general food restaurant. It can not be sold anywhere else, but it can be operated only by licensed facilities, tourist attractions, sports facilities, urban parks, and streams. A food truck with a legal license must have a business report in the truck. Not having a business report, a truck can be considered as illegal food truck. The government is trying to cultivate legal food trucks. Republic of Korea's government legalized food trucks in September 2014. In July 2016, the government reviewed the revision and decision to allow food trucks to move freely in order to ease the grievances of conventional legal food trucks.

Government regulations specify that the height of the cooking area shall be less than 1.5 m (1.2 m) and the area shall be not less than 0.5 sq m and not more than 0.5 sq m.

== Policies for growth of food trucks ==
=== Seoul ===
According to the Seoul city council on July 18, the city council discussed ways to invigorate food trucks in the Seoul Metropolitan area by holding a conference session with related departments and food trucks.

According to the Seoul Food and Drug Administration (KFDA) released in Seoul, the number of food trucks reported in Seoul totaled 424,000 in late March, accounting for 32 percent of the total. Currently, the number of food trucks sold is 250 days, and the average business period is 144 days after start-up. Thirty-five percent of the total sales were closed in six months, accounting for about 80 percent of the total sales and the lowest among the total buyers. However, the food truck owners are having a hard time due to a lack of food truck operating areas with stable profits. Seoul has been searching for possible food truck locations since last September, but it has not been able to set up more than half of the stores due to opposition from existing businesses, insufficient flow populations, and difficulties in transportation. Sales at the store are also sluggish. Another problem was that food truck sales are only taking place at events and festivals. In other words, the movie has limits on the creation of regular profits except for the night market and the Han River project. Such poor conditions caused complaints from vendors at the conference.

Korean food truck industry is saturated, eventually sharing and experiencing a rift with the traditional market, said an official at the Korea Food Truck Association, which introduces only about 200,000 to 100,000 won per day in Seocho, where food trucks are relatively popular. Many food truck operators are unable to enter the night market, said an official at the Korea Food Truck Cooperative Federation. "We don't have any countermeasures, and we believe that we will be able to sell our cars conveniently," said the youths and the vulnerable. The National Food and Transportation Workers' Union said, "We don't want to participate in the top 10 percent of the market." The official also said, "The official announcement of the official office is officially posted on the homepage," adding, "We are now trying hard to buy a large number of vendors and commissions for paying tuition fees and fees." One food truck operator said, "We're worried about increasing food trucks," adding, "There are plenty of vendors who are going to shut up in droves, and only food truck makers can be called." In response, the Seoul Metropolitan Government announced that it will boost food trucks by securing business sites. The Seoul Metropolitan Government plans to hire 53 new food trucks, including parks, the Han River, and Seoul, which are recommended by food truck operators in 34 districts, to operate 94 trucks. In addition, if the sales sites were judged to be ineligible for sales, they changed their sales sites and allowed them to obtain counseling from the credit guarantee fund of the credit guarantee fund. Moreover, it plans to expand the night sky market by 5 spots (162 trucks) to 8 (252) by the end of next year. Seoul has set a goal of boosting the number of food trucks to 800 by next year. The Seoul Metropolitan Government will also step up cooperation with local governments to boost food trucks. Festivals that control large festivals or roads, and festivals that support city budgets, are required to set up an area for food trucks. Local governments were also required to induce participation by special grants or projects for cooperation between municipal and provincial governments. said a Seoul Metropolitan Government official said "We need to look at whether there is a conflict between the local authorities and the local government to expand the business force" and also they pronounced that "We need to find ways to promote the coexistence of existing markets." After presiding over the meeting, Seoul Mayor Park Won-soon said, "At least 1,000 trucks should be run in Seoul. We will have three to five jobs per person, and we will conduct a test in Kimpo".

=== Gyeonggi province ===
Gyeonggi Province council is promoting food trucks to support the underprivileged and youth start-ups. The council said it will operate two food trucks in the morning and lunch hours at the parking lot in front of the Suwon Chapter of Suwon National Assembly for two weeks from July 18 to 29. Since the Gyeonggi Provincial Office of Food and Drug Administration has a collective lunch facility, it is impossible to establish food trucks according to the original regulations. The official explained, "The wiretapping facilities are not permitted to operate food trucks, but we decided to test food trucks to expand food trucks, including public institutions, to expand food trucks". Gyeonggi province council decided to run the trial to promote the establishment of food trucks by improving consumers' vague distrust of food trucks and the current system, which prevents youths and the underprivileged from starting businesses.

The company seeks to lift restrictions on the restriction of business zones that prevent food trucks from engaging in food trucks. Food trucks, according to the Food and Hygiene Act, are only permitted to operate in five locations, including urban parks, sports facilities, streams, recreational sites, and tourist attractions to prevent conflicts with existing commercial areas.

The government plans to submit a proposal to expand the number of houses, including 885 city parks and 3,368 sports facilities, including public facilities. During the trial period, the company will hold a discussion on how to manage food for the city's executives and employees in the field of pilot operation. Current law requires permission to use and obtain profit from food trucks operating in public places such as parks or sports facilities, where the participation of food trucks by the underprivileged who lack financing is based on the highest bid. The ministry will strongly suggest to the government any areas that need improvement in the system, such as improvement of laws and regulations, that are revealed through the trial run.

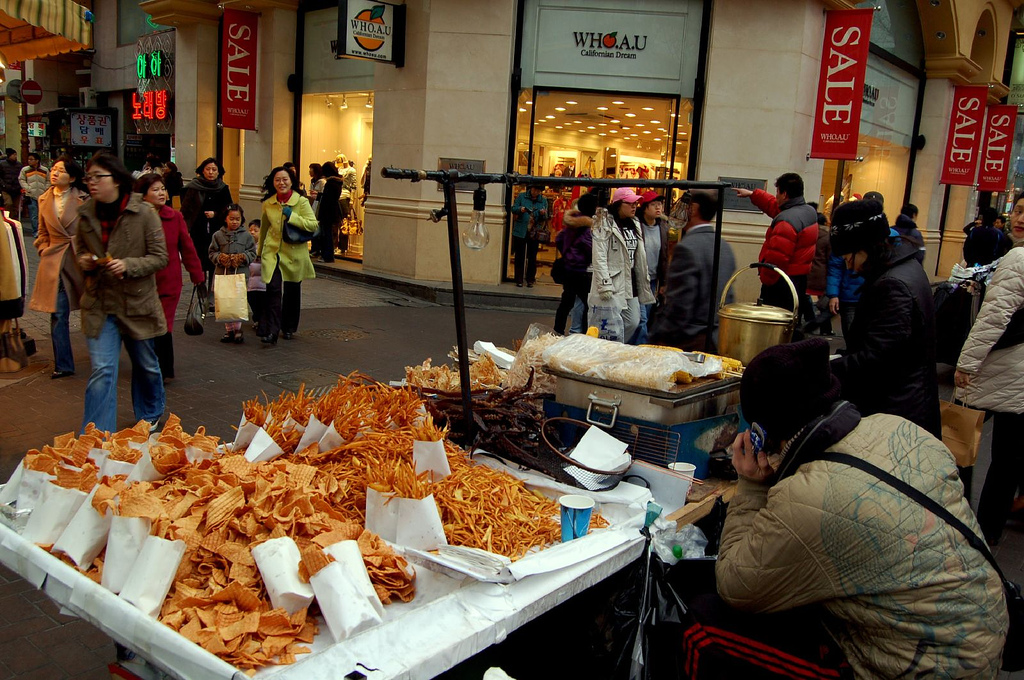
Myeongdong street food trucks

== Locations ==
Food trucks are popular in Myeong-dong and Noryangjin. The area between the 9th and 10th exit of Gangnam station in Gangnam has become a popular food truck destination due to the TV program Baek Jong-won's Food Truck.

=== Han River Food Truck Zone ===
Food trucks at Bamdokkaebi night market have attracted attention. The number of food trucks participating in the Bamdokkaebi night market was only 124 in March 2016. However, the number has increased by 528 over the past year.

=== College campuses ===
On April 17, The Food and Drug Administration (KFDA) announced a revision of the provisions of the Enforcement Regulations of Enforcement Rules of Food Hygiene Act, which allows food parcels to be sold in college. " Currently, the government is allowing food trucks to operate exclusively on Yuwon facilities, tourist attractions, sports facilities, urban parks and streams. However, the revision "allowed only universities and those who have signed up to work in restaurants or bakeries".

The company announced that they would sign a joint venture with Hyundai Motor Co., Kuffing Grough, Kunnish, and Yonsei University, to support food trucks catering to college students. An official at the ministry explained, We are revising related laws to provide an opportunity for university students to start businesses through food trucks and learn know-how from the industry within universities.

== In media ==
Baek Jong-won's Food Truck has aired since July 21, 2017 on SBS TV. The program is a reality show where Baek Jong-won coaches food truck owners who are having problems producing profit.

== See also ==
- Street food in South Korea
