= Food truck =

Motor vehicle used to prepare and sell food

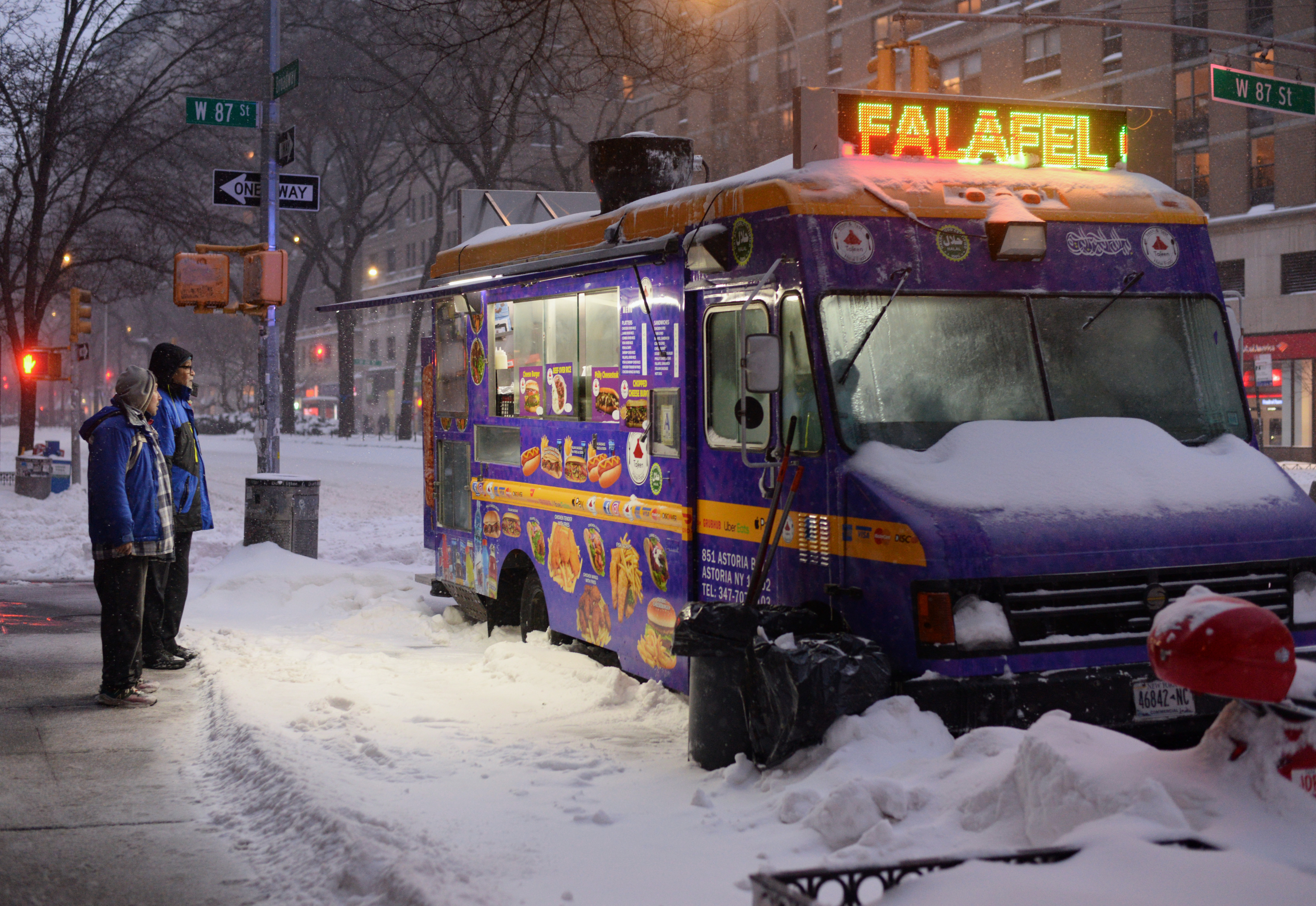
A Workhorse step van food truck in New York City during a snowstorm

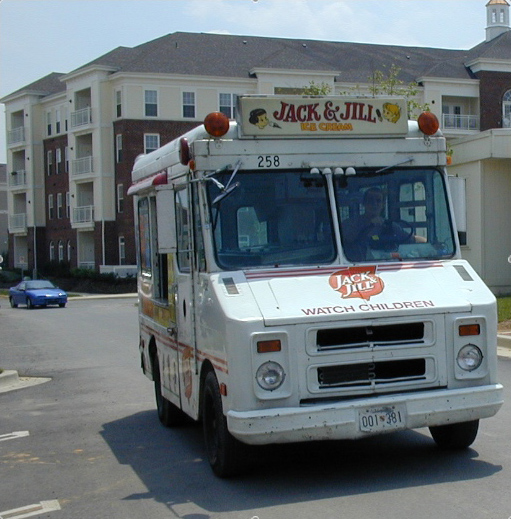
An ice cream truck based on a smaller Chevrolet Step-Van (P10 chassis)

A food truck is a large motorized vehicle (such as a van or multi-stop truck) or trailer equipped to store, transport, cook, prepare, serve and/or sell food.

Some food trucks, such as ice cream trucks, sell frozen or prepackaged food, but many have on-board kitchens and prepare food from scratch, or they reheat food that was previously prepared in a brick and mortar commercial kitchen. Sandwiches, hamburgers, hot dogs, chicken, tacos, pizza, french fries and other typical fast food and finger food staples are common food truck fare, though since the pop-up restaurant phenomenon of the 2010s, food trucks specializing in a wide variety of gourmet, specialty, global, regional, and fusion cuisines have seen growing popularity. Food trucks often also sell or fully specialize in beverages such as soft drink, juice, coffee, tea, and water, as well as treats such as ice cream, pastries, and fried dough.

Historical predecessors of food trucks were horse-drawn chuckwagons and lunch wagons of the 19th century. By the early-to-mid-20th century, trucks and vans were being used both as mobile canteens in the military and as "roach coaches" that traveled to worksites and primarily catered to blue-collar workers. Into the 21st century, economic and cultural shifts surrounding the foodservice industry led to a considerable rise in popularity among customers and food truck operation as a career. Though food trucks primarily developed in the United States, United Kingdom, and France, they have become increasingly popular and more available in other parts of Europe and the Americas, as well as Asia and Oceania.

Food trucks, along with food booths and food carts, are major components of the street food industry that serve an estimated 2.5 billion people daily.

== History ==
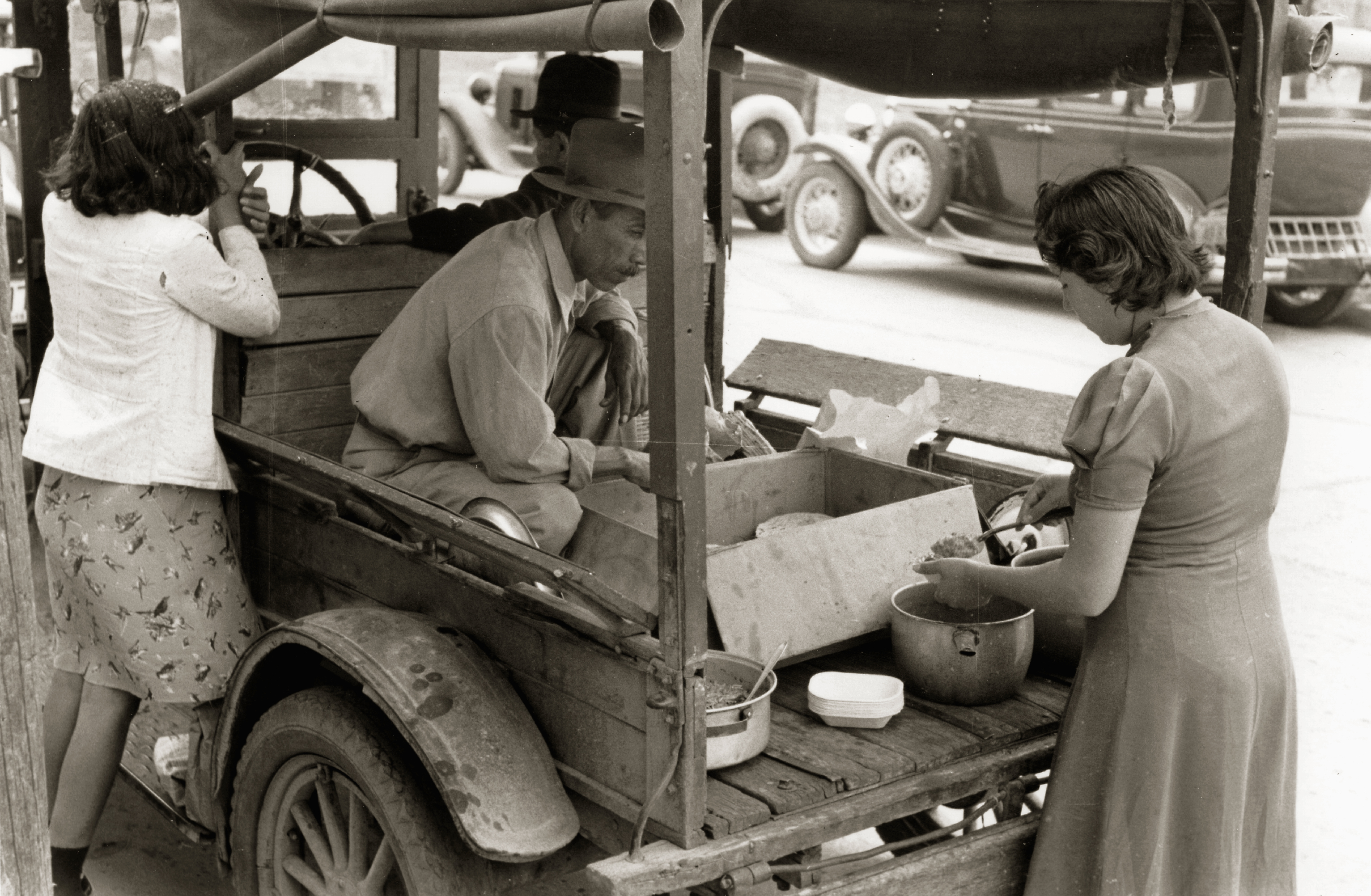
A Mexican lunch wagon serving tortillas and refried beans to workers at a pecan shelling plant, in San Antonio, Texas, 1939.

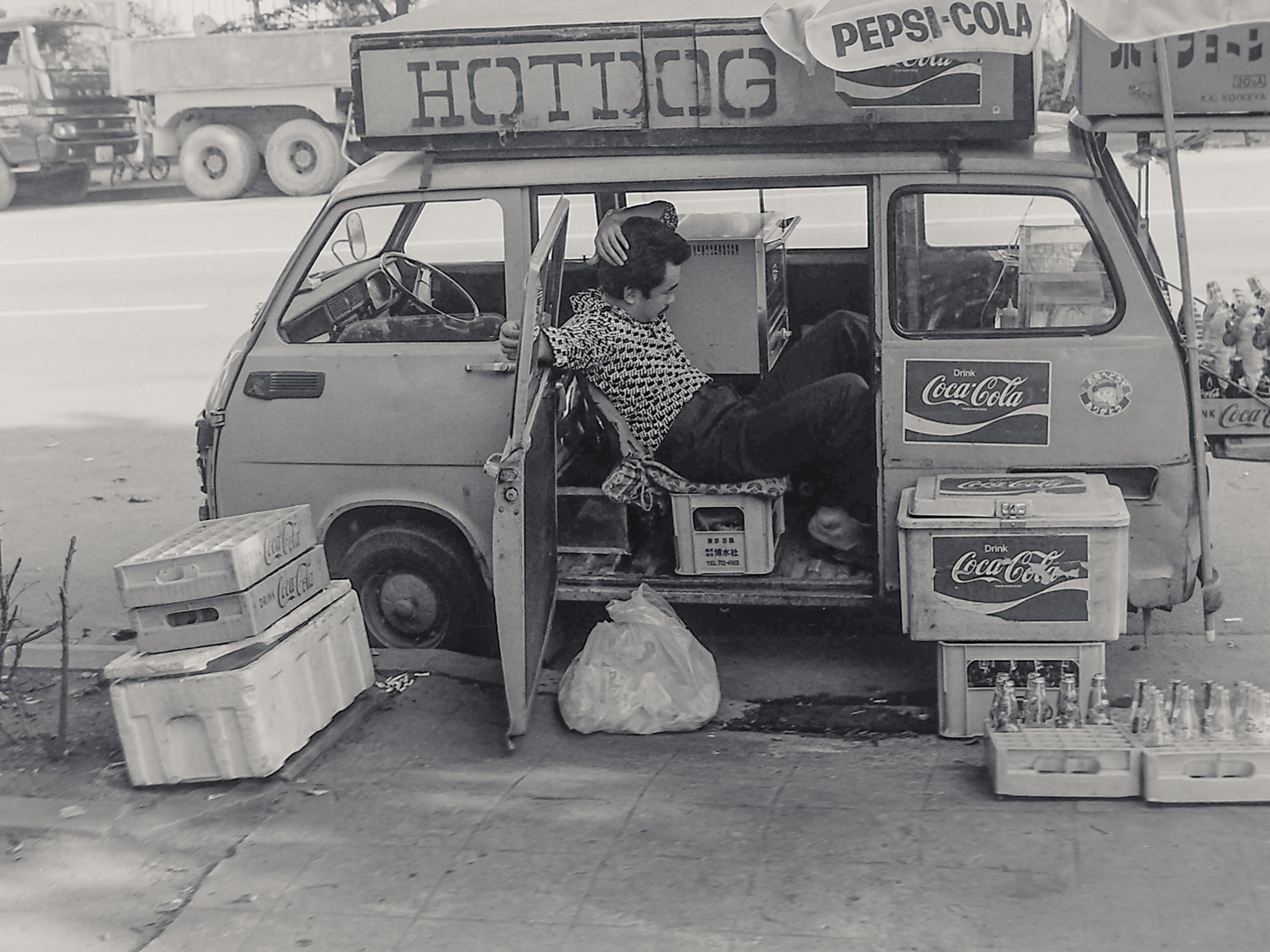
A hot dog truck in Shinjuku, Tokyo, Japan in the late 1970s or early 1980s

=== United States ===
In the United States, the Texas chuckwagon is a precursor to the American food truck. In the later 19th century, herding cattle from the Southwest to markets in the North and East kept cowhands on the trail for months at a time. In 1866, the "father of the Texas Panhandle", cattle rancher Charles Goodnight, fitted a sturdy old United States Army wagon with interior shelving and drawers, and stocked it with kitchenware, food, and medical supplies. Food consisted of dried beans, coffee, cornmeal, greasy cloth-wrapped bacon, salt pork, dried or salted beef, and other easy-to-preserve foodstuffs. The wagon was also stocked with a water barrel and a sling to kindle wood to heat and cook food.

Another early relative of the modern food truck is the "lunch wagon", horse-drawn street cars whose night version was known as the "night owl", as conceived by food vendor Walter Scott in 1872 as a "kitchen on wheels". Scott cut windows in a small covered wagon, parked it in front of a newspaper office in Providence, Rhode Island, and sold sandwiches, pies, and coffee to pressmen and journalists. By the 1880s, former lunch counter worker Thomas H. Buckley was manufacturing lunch wagons in Worcester, Massachusetts. He introduced various models, like the Owl and the White House Cafe, with features that included sinks, refrigerators, cooking stoves, colored windows, and other ornamentation.

In 1936 the Food Code spread its regulatory umbrella to include food trucks as a result of their introduction to society.

Later versions of the food truck were mobile canteens, which were created in the late 1950s. These mobile canteens were authorized by the U.S. Army and operated on stateside Army bases.

Mobile food trucks, nicknamed "roach coaches" or "gut trucks", have been around for years, serving construction sites, factories, and other blue-collar locations. In big cities, the food truck traditionally provided a means for the on-the-go person to grab a quick bite at a low cost. Food trucks are still sought out for nostalgia from this era.

During the 2010s the economic changes caused by the Great Recession, technological factors, and street food being "hip" or "chic" have combined to increase the number of food trucks in the United States. By 2024, the Bureau of Labor Statistics reported 44,119 people working in jobs related to food trucks, up 907% since 2000. The construction business was drying up, leading to a surplus of food trucks, and chefs from high-end restaurants were being laid off. For experienced cooks suddenly without work, the food truck seemed to be a clear choice and a smaller financial investment than a brick-and-mortar restaurant. Once more commonplace in American coastal big cities like New York City and Los Angeles, gourmet food trucks are now to be found as well in suburbs and small towns. Food trucks are also hired for special events, like weddings, movie shoots, and corporate gatherings, and also to carry advertising promoting companies and brands.

== Gourmet trucks ==
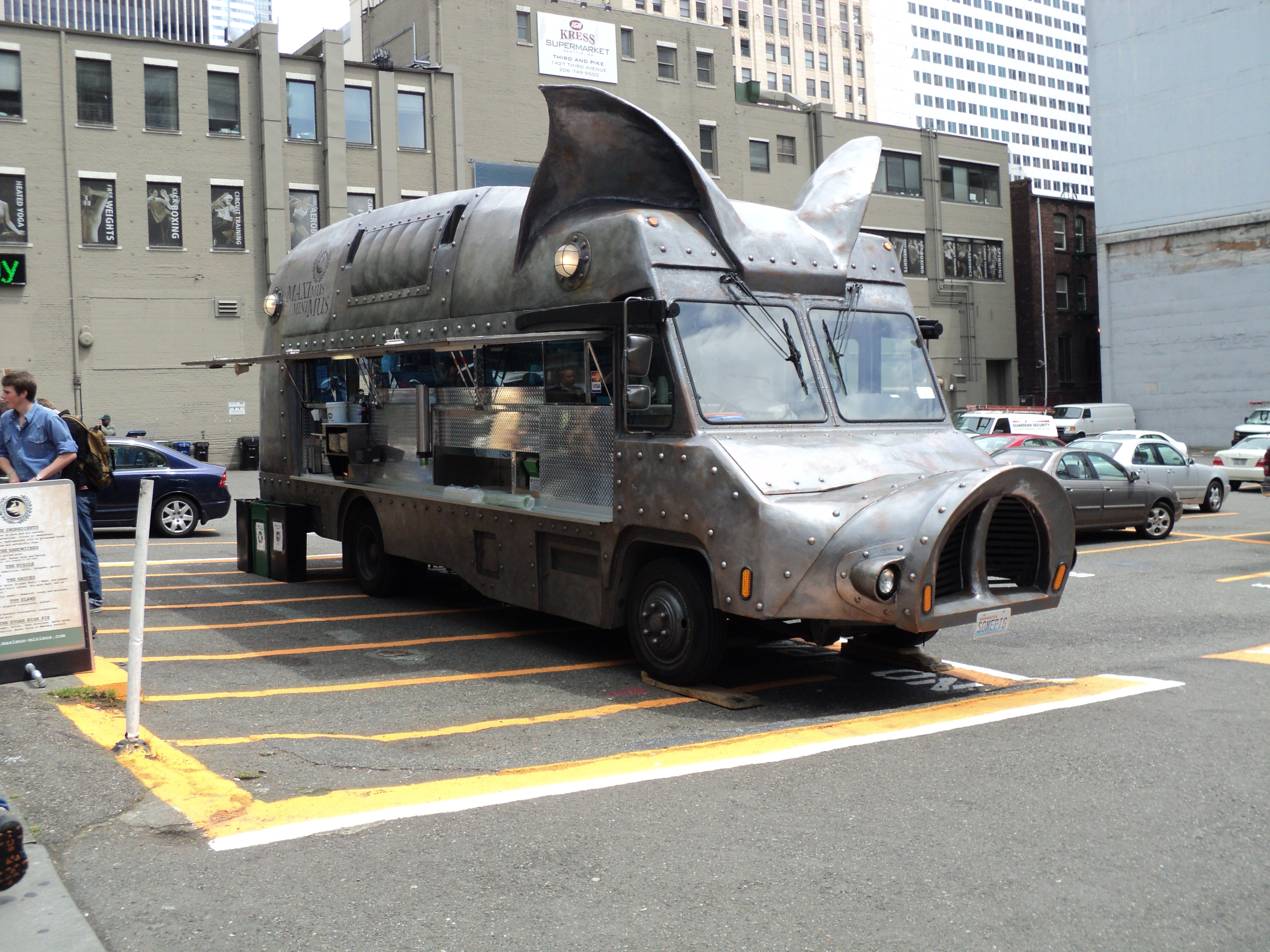
The Maximus/Minimus food truck in Seattle, Washington in 2010

In 2011, USA Today noted that food trucks selling pricier food were gaining popularity across the United States, contrary to a common perception that food trucks are typically run-down and found at construction sites. In 2009, New York magazine noted that the food truck had "largely transcended its roach-coach classification and is now a respectable venue for aspiring chefs to launch careers." These gourmet trucks' menus run the gamut of ethnic and fusion cuisine. Often focusing on limited but creative dishes at reasonable prices, they offer customers a chance to experience food they otherwise may not. Finding a niche seems to be a path to success for most trucks. While one truck may specialize in outlandish burgers, another may serve only lobster rolls.

== Food truck rallies ==
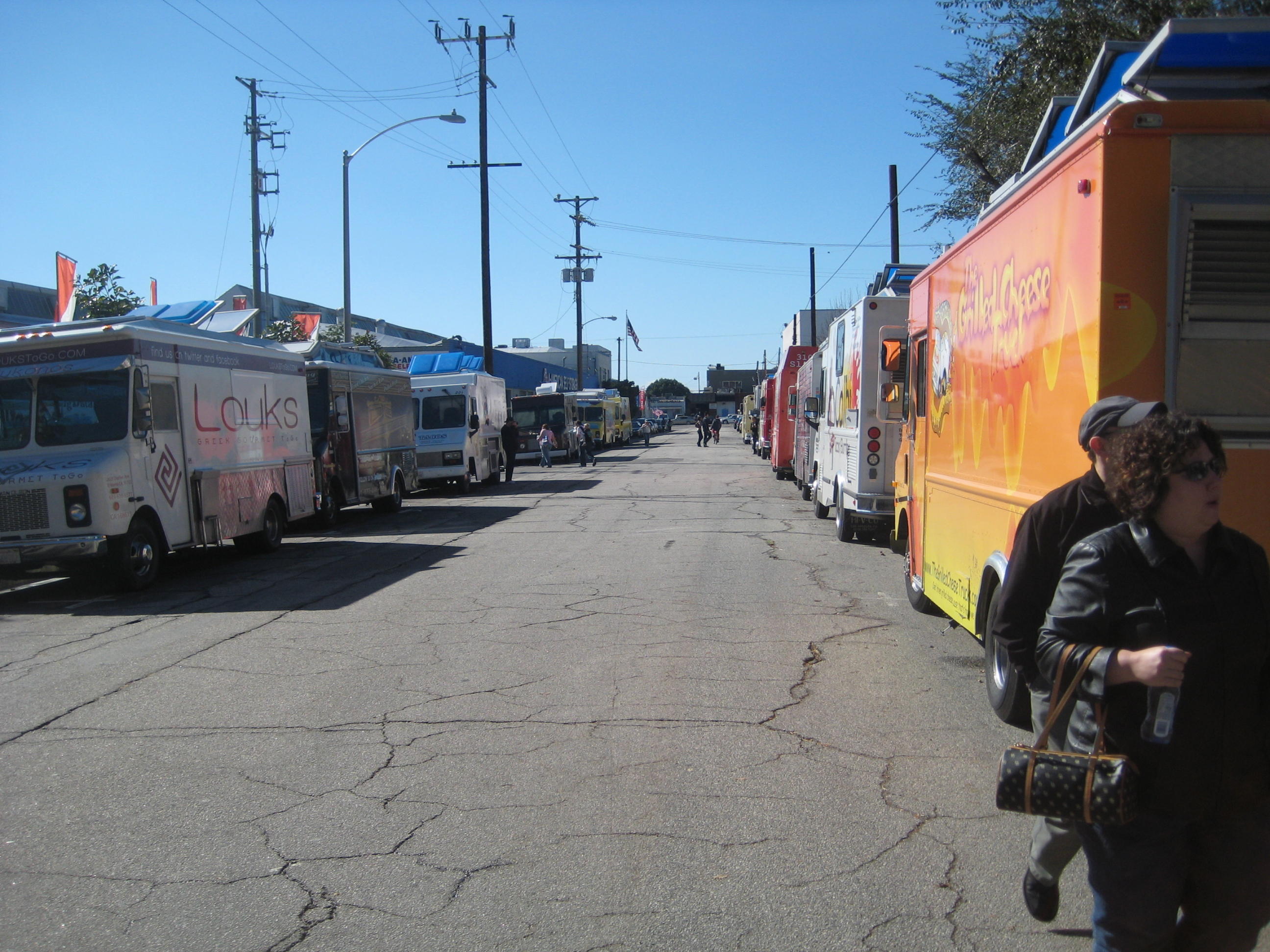
Food trucks at the "Food Trucks for Haiti" benefit in West Los Angeles in 2010, supporting relief

Food truck rallies and food truck parks are also growing in popularity in the United States, wherein multiple food trucks gather in one location, usually in cooperation with each other, with the goal of attracting business through the variety offered. On August 31, 2013, Tampa, Florida hosted the world's largest food truck rally, with 99 trucks attending. The Tampa Rally broke its own record by bringing together 121 food trucks in 2014. The Chicago Food Truck Festival hosts over 40 trucks each year with 60,000 guests participating over two days in Chicago. Food truck parks, offering permanent locations, are found in urban and suburban areas across the US.

== Business and economics ==
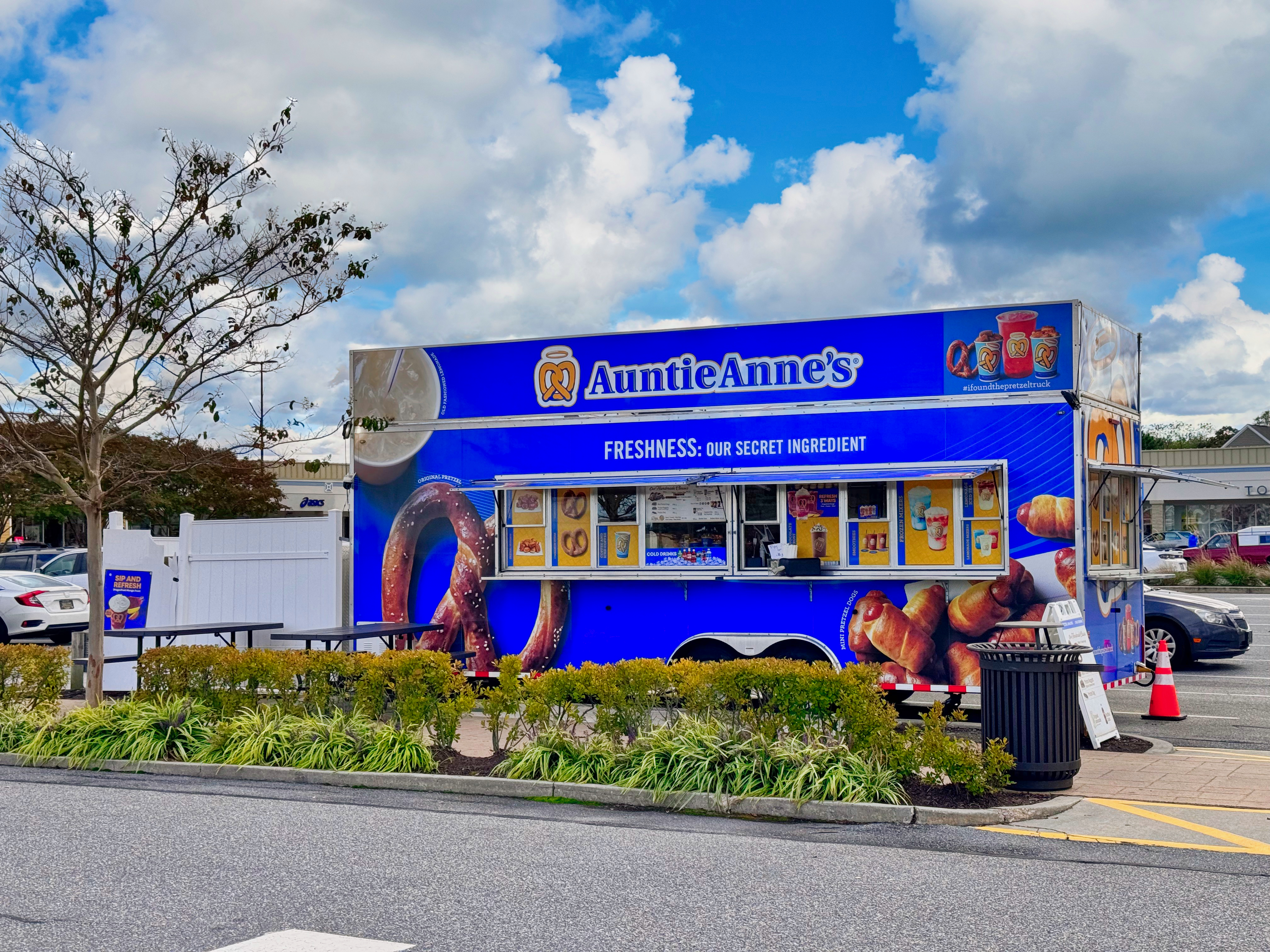
An Auntie Anne's chain food truck in Rehoboth Beach, Delaware

Food trucks are subject to the same range of concerns as other foodservice businesses. There are a variety of permits to obtain, and a health code to observe. Equipment, labor and fuel costs are a significant part of the overhead.

Legal definitions and requirements for food trucks vary widely by country and locality. For example, in Toronto, some of the requirements include business and liability insurance, a Commercial Vehicle Operator's Registration for the truck, permits for each municipality being operated in (downtown, various suburbs), a food handler certificate, appropriate driver's licenses for drivers, assistant's licenses for assistants, and a health inspection.

As the rising number and popularity of food trucks push them into the food mainstream, region by region, problems with local legislators and police reacting to new situations, and pushback from brick-and-mortar restaurants fearing competition, are amongst issues having to be worked through, creating significant business uncertainty. Chicago long held the distinction of being the only city in the United States that did not allow food trucks to cook on board, which required trucks to prepare food in a commercial kitchen, then wrap and label the food and load it into a food warmer. In 2012, under pressure from food truck owners and supporters, including the University of Chicago Law School, regulations were changed to allow on-board cooking, however, controversially, food trucks are required to park 200 feet away from any restaurant, which virtually eliminates busy downtown locations (an example of pushback, restaurant owners lobbying city government).

In the US, specialized food truck outfitters offer comprehensive start-up services that can include concept development, training, and business support, in addition to outfitted trucks. Often, however, it makes more sense for a new operator to lease a truck. In the US, food trucks are a $1.2 billion industry. By 2017, the US food truck industry had surpassed $2.7 billion.

Expansion from a single truck to fleets and retail outlets has proven possible. Los Angeles-based gourmet ice cream maker Coolhaus grew from a single truck in 2009 to 11 trucks and carts, two storefronts, and over 2,500 retail store partners by September 2014.

The libertarian Reason magazine states that in US, cities, food trucks are subject to protectionist regulations designed to prevent them from competing with brick and mortar restaurants. For example, in Chicago, a regulation prevents food trucks "...from selling food within 200 feet of brick-and-mortar restaurants and, hence, prohibit them from operating throughout the city's downtown area", which critics have called an "anti-competitive" rule for food truck operators.

The popularity of food trucks lead to the creation of associations that protect and support their business rights, such as the Philadelphia Mobile Food Association.

Tracking food trucks has been made easy with social media. Platforms, like Facebook and Twitter, let food trucks inform their customers where they can be located or what their menu offers at any moment.

As the food truck industry continues to expand in 2025, many vendors are adopting innovative strategies such as modular kitchen design, eco-friendly power systems, and digital ordering to meet the demands of modern urban consumers.

== Food safety concerns ==
Food trucks are washed in a Long Island City warehouse at the end of the day

Food trucks have unique health risks compared to regular restaurants when it comes to food safety and the prevention of foodborne illness. Most food trucks do not have access to adequate clean and hot water necessary to wash hands or to rinse off vegetables, as required by most health codes or regulations.

In June 2017, The Boston Globe reviewed the 2016 city health records and found that food trucks had been cited for violations 200 times, with half of the violations being minor in nature and the other half being serious violations. When compared to fixed location restaurants, the city closed nine of the 96 licensed food trucks in 2016 and closed only two out of 100 restaurants. A majority of the serious violations were related to the lack of water and hand washing.

== By country ==
=== Americas ===
==== Brazil ====
In Brazil, food trucks started with trucks that served food during carnival time and after soccer games, sporting events, and concerts. However, when trucks began to serve gourmet food (with higher prices), food trucks were no longer associated with popular food, and it became trendy to eat street food from food trucks. Nowadays they are all commonly found across Brazil, at practically any place where there is potential demand for regular meals or snacks.

==== Canada ====
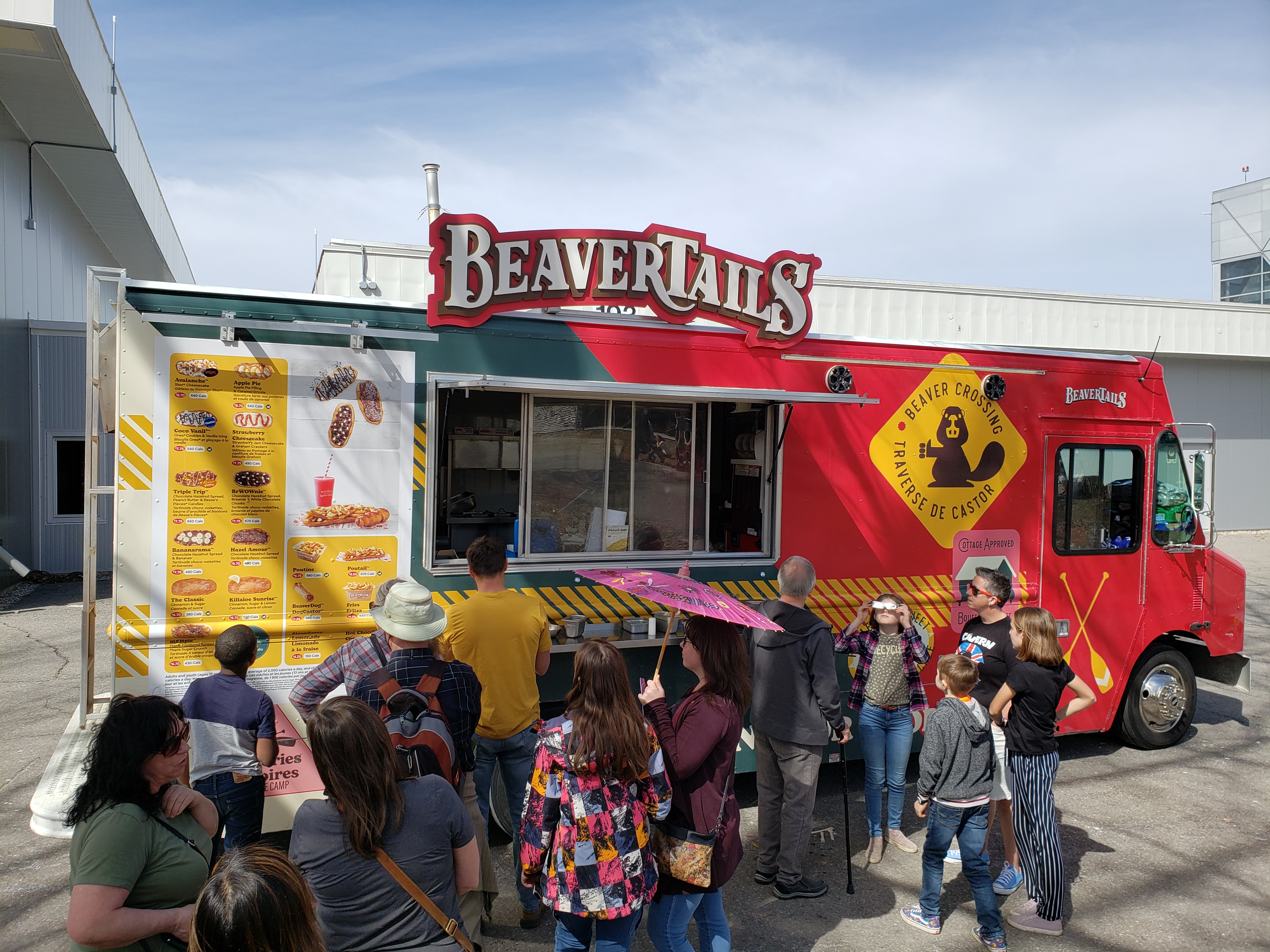
A BeaverTails food truck at the Canada Aviation and Space Museum during an event for the solar eclipse of April 8, 2024

In Canada, food trucks, also known as cantines (French for cafeteria) in Quebec, are present across the country, serving a wide variety of cuisines.

==== Mexico ====
Although street food in Mexico is unregulated, food trucks are becoming increasingly popular as of 2013 and owners have created an association to pursue the professionalization and expansion of this commercial sector. In addition to the food trucks catering on the streets, there are regular bazaars organized to introduce their products to the consumers.

In response to this popularity, the local authorities have issued a series of special regulations to incorporate them into legal schemes that would help to regulate this form of commerce. As a new food truck business model emerged, some local bodybuilders begin to make food trucks from new vehicles from major car-makers.

=== Asia-Pacific ===
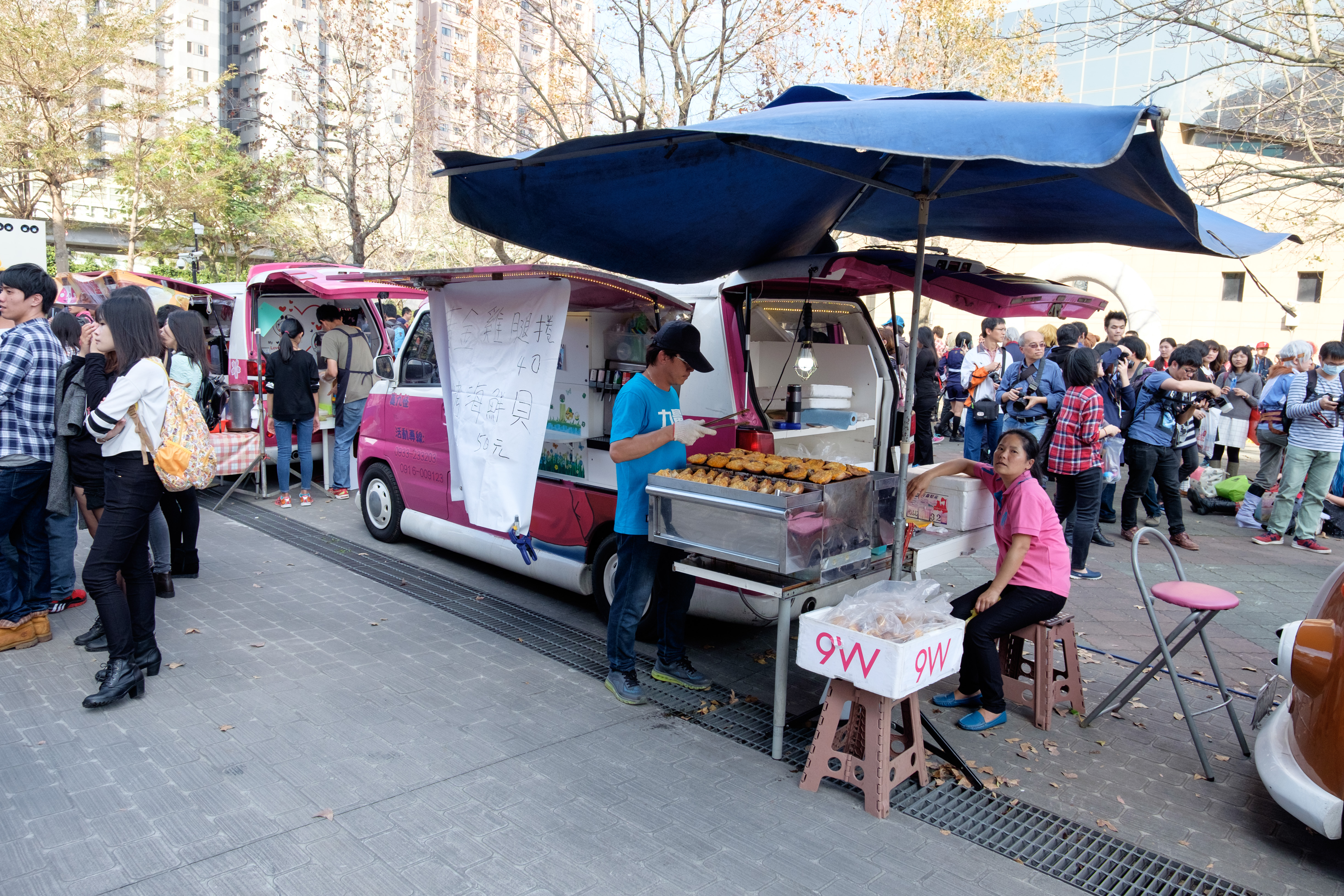
A food truck in Taiwan

==== Australia ====
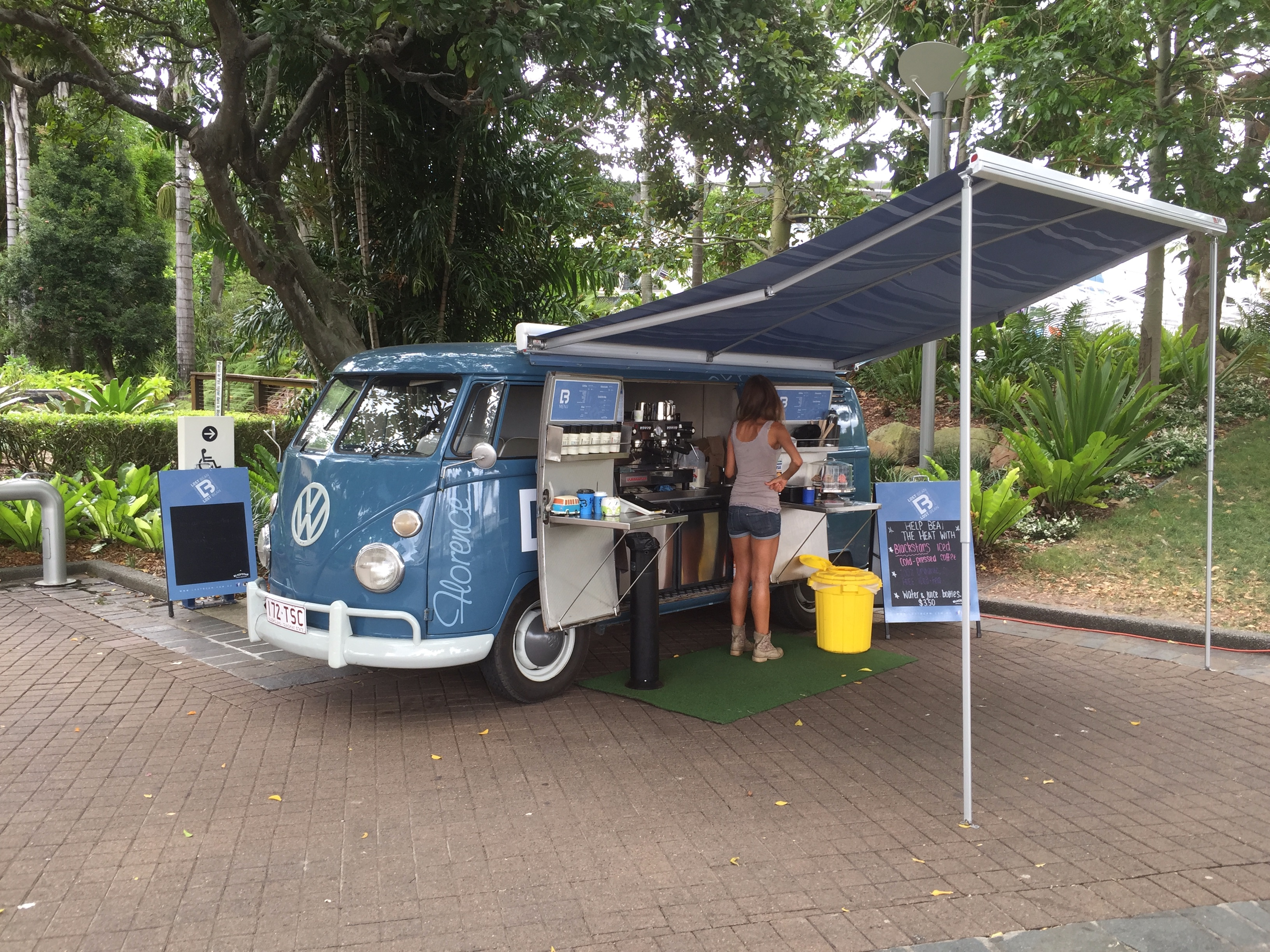
A Volkswagen Type 2 mobile café in the South Bank Parklands in Brisbane, Australia

Food trucks are available across Australia, and are covered as a popular trend in the media. An Australian national online directory, Where The Truck, listed around 5,000 food trucks in 2020.

==== Hong Kong ====
In Hong Kong, food trucks started to hit the streets in February 2017.

==== Japan ====
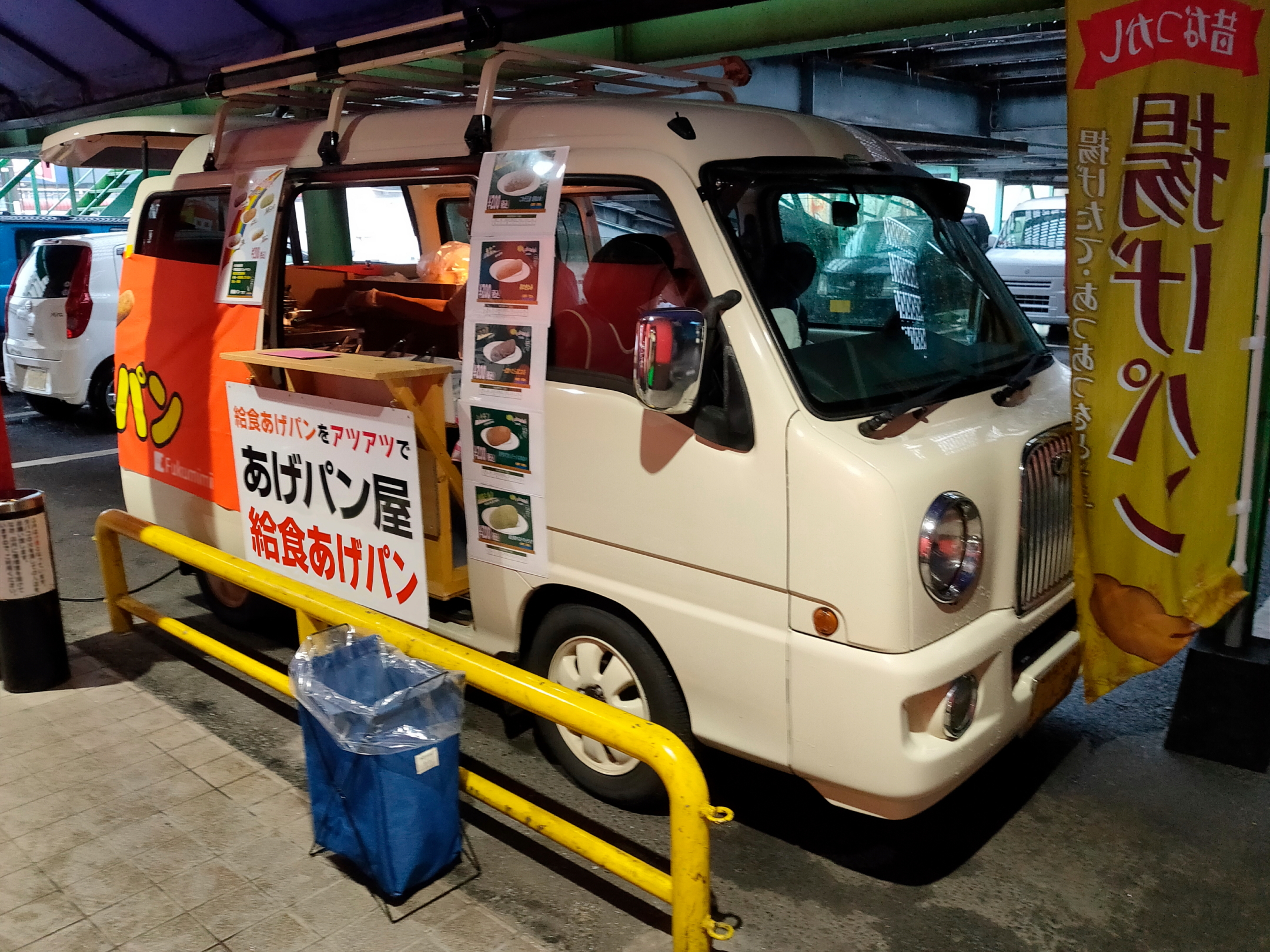
A Subaru Sambar food truck in Japan selling fried bread.

In Japan, there are bento (box lunch), ramen, fried chicken, fried bread, pizza, crêpe, and ice cream "kitchen cars" (キッチンカー, kitchinkā).

==== South Korea ====
The national government legalized food trucks in South Korea in September 2014 and numbers have continued to climb steadily since then. Many young people are trying to create food trucks, and a wider range of products is becoming available. However, it is not possible to operate food trucks everywhere. In the case of Korea, there is only a limited number of places designated by each local government.

==== Thailand ====
Food trucks in Thailand have unique characteristics, as the country has a long-standing culture of street food. Most commonly, food is sold from pushcarts. However, if it's sold from a vehicle, it's typically referred to as a "rot phumphuang" (รถพุ่มพวง; pronounced [rót pʰûm.pʰūaŋ]) or "rot kapkhao" (รถกับข้าว; pronounced [rót kàp.kʰâːw]), named after their distinctive appearance and function. Rot phumphuang (literally "bouquet truck") and "rot kapkhao" (literally "rice-and-dishes truck") are common terms for mobile grocery vehicles. These are usually pickup trucks modified to carry and sell a variety of fresh produce, cooked food, dry goods, and household items. The name "rot phumphuang" comes from the way goods are displayed, arranged densely on racks that resemble a bouquet; "rot kapkhao" emphasizes the ready-made food aspect, as "kapkhao" means "with rice", referring to dishes commonly eaten with rice. Rot phumphuang may take the form of either a pickup truck or a motorbike with a sidecar, and they don't always sell just food, many also offer household items, shoes, and other everyday goods. Rot phumphuang can also come as a motorbike with a sidecar. This business model boomed during the peak of COVID-19 pandemic.

=== Europe ===
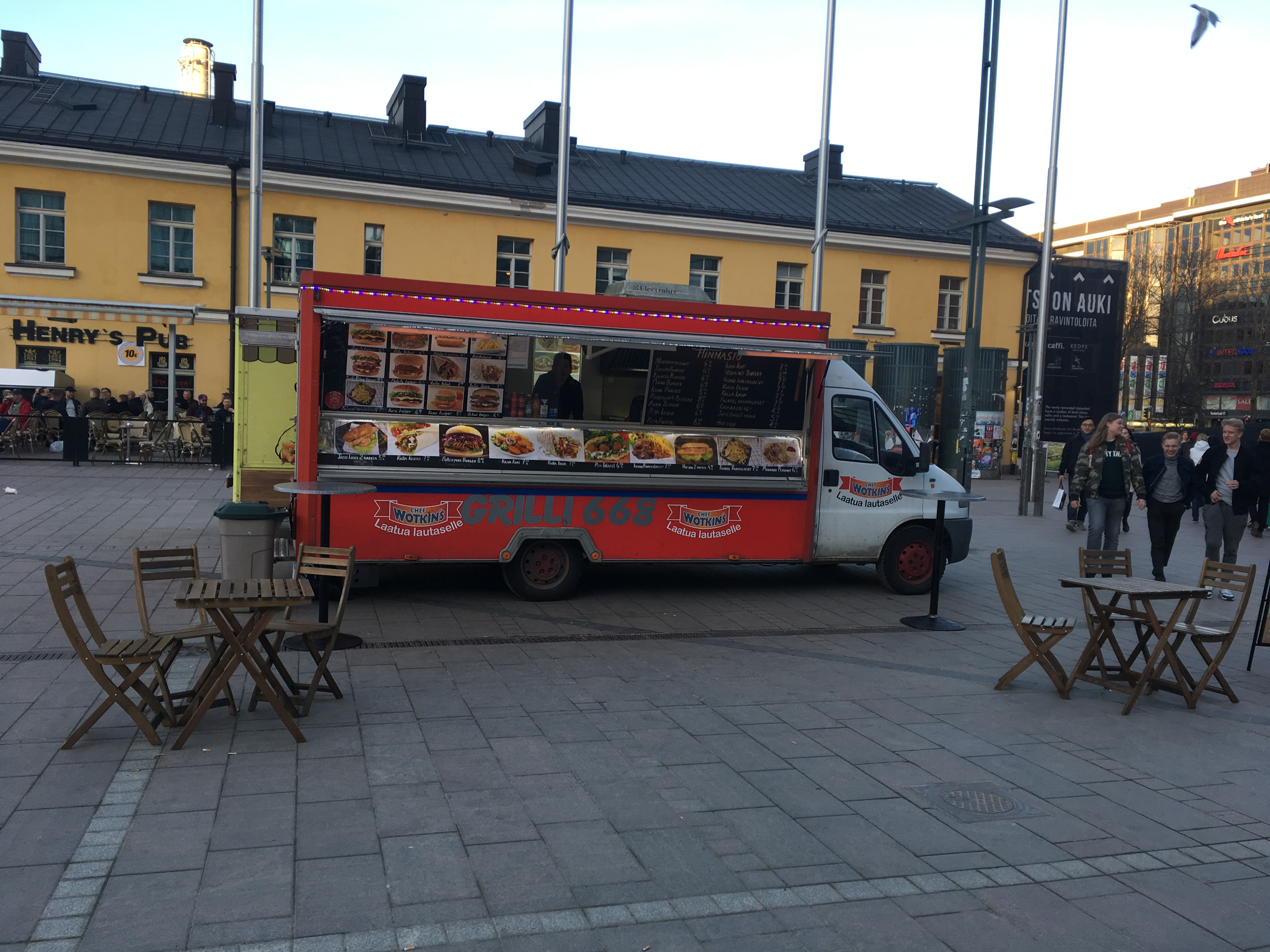
A food truck at Kamppi Plaza in Helsinki, Finland

==== Belgium ====
Chip trucks have long been a staple of the Belgian countryside. The Belgian Food Truck Association is lobbying to legalize food trucks on the street. Brussels was the first European city to propose locations for food trucks at football matches. Belgium also holds the Brussels Food Truck Festival, the largest of its kind in Europe, every year in May.

==== France ====
While it is commonly admitted that the first French food trucks ("camions-restaurants" in French even though the word "foodtruck" is used more frequently) appeared in Marseille in the 1960's with trucks selling pizzas, it is proved that it actually appeared for the first time in Paris back in 1924. At the time, Alfred Morain, the "Préfet" (chief of police) of the Seine region decided to develop and spread what they called then "friteries automobiles" (automobile French fries shop, which were then called "Auto-Morain"). This political measure took place in a context of economical crisis following First World War, which led people to lack essential products, including food. Most of the time, these shops sold 185 grams of French fries and fried fish for "1 franc 25" (1,26€ ,1,38$ in 2023). It also was the first time that fish was sold along with fries in France but then again, this took place in a context of promotion of the French fishing business. The arrival of this kind of shops did not go unnoticed: many press articles and political staging took place. In 1925, "Le Petit Inventeur", a newspaper, commented on the success of the "operation" and on the "very interesting prices [of the products]", and, in 1926, Mario (Marius) Roustan, who was the State Under-Secretary dedicated to "public works, ports, merchant marine and fishing" (Sous-Secrétaire d'Etat aux travaux publics, chargé des ports, de la marine marchande et des pêches,), publicised his visit of a "rolling French fries shop" (friterie roulante), which was called "Friterie Auguste" and sold fries and fried fish in Paris.

Nowadays, foodtrucks are very popular in France. Their owners need to obtain permission from four separate government agencies, including the Prefecture of Police. Most of the trucks offer tacos, hamburgers, pizza. Certain regions have specific specialities, such as galette-saucisse (sausage within a buckwheat crepe) in Brittany or fries in the north.

==== Ireland ====
Compared to other countries, food trucks in Ireland are a relatively new addition to the Irish food industry. All food trucks in Ireland must be registered with the Health Service Executive (HSE) and are inspected by Environmental Health Officers (EHO).

==== United Kingdom ====
With the advent of motorised transport during World War II, food trucks came into common use. Mobile canteens were used in almost all theatres of war to boost morale and provide food as a result of the successful tea lady experiment.

Food trucks today are sometimes known as snack vans or burger vans. They can be found on many major trunk roads at the side of the road or in areas that have a large pedestrian population, such as town centres and events such as village fêtes. These vans can specialise in many different food types, such as doughnuts, hamburgers, chili and chips, as well as ethnic food. Some people prefer to stop at snack vans when travelling, due to the low price, rather than stopping at a motorway service station where prices can be extremely high.

With the British street food industry growing 20% year-on-year, the increase in popularity of having a mobile food van at events has been substantial.

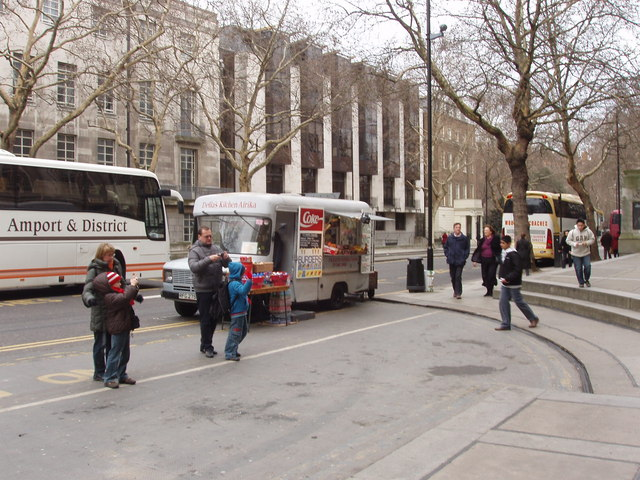
A snack van at the British Museum in London

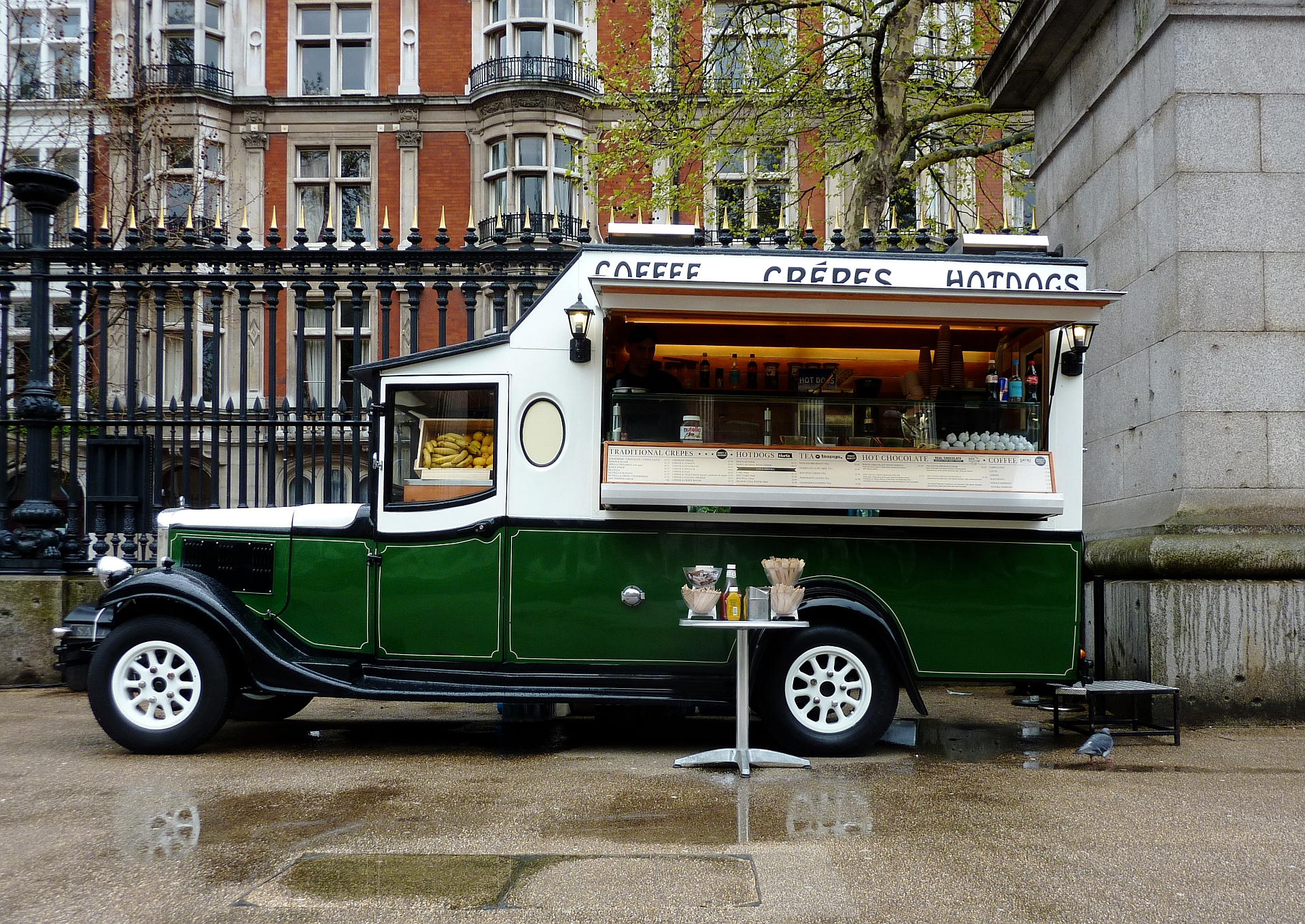
A food truck in London that sells hot dogs, crêpes, and coffee

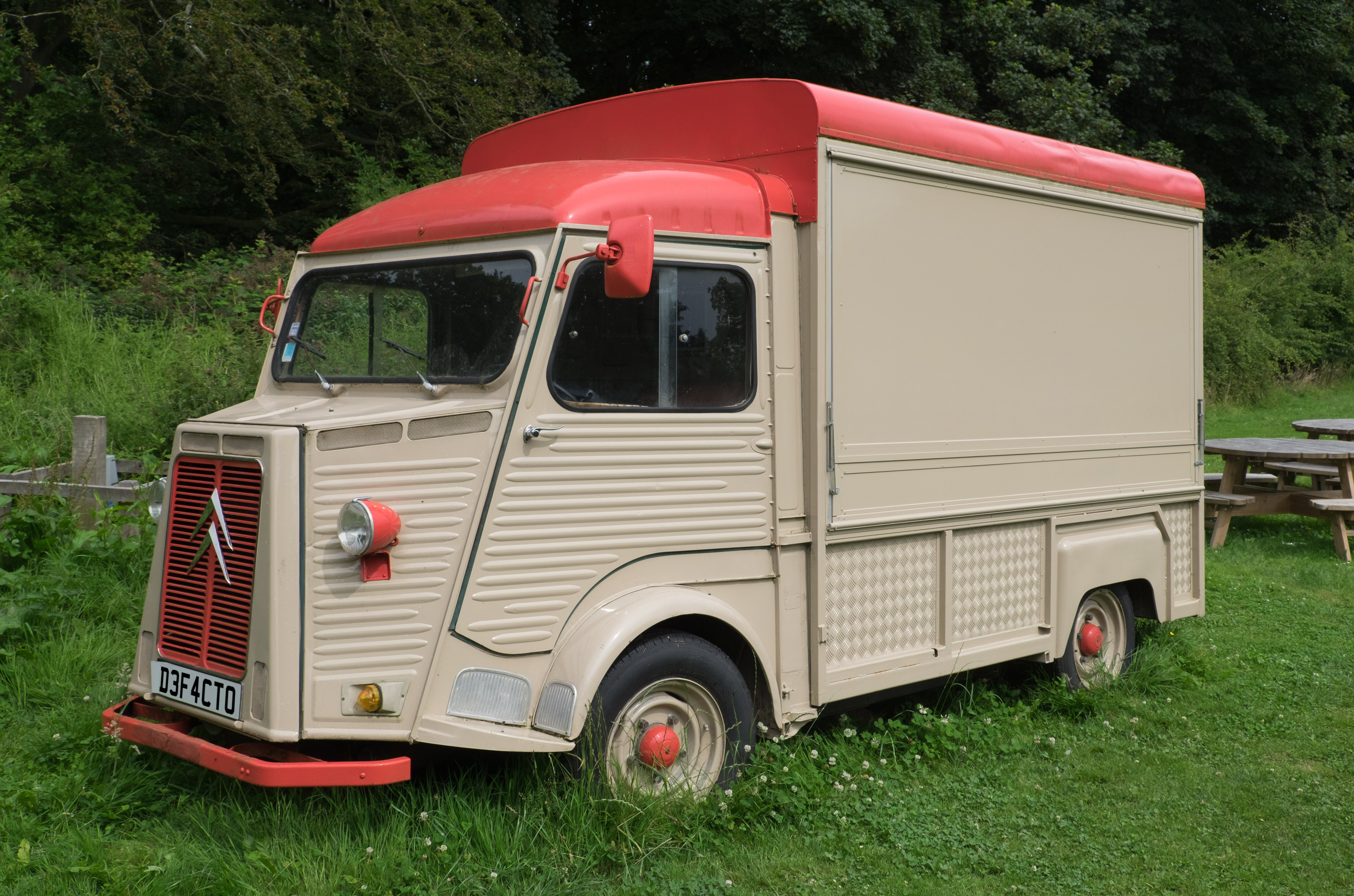
A Citroën HY food van in Norfolk 2016

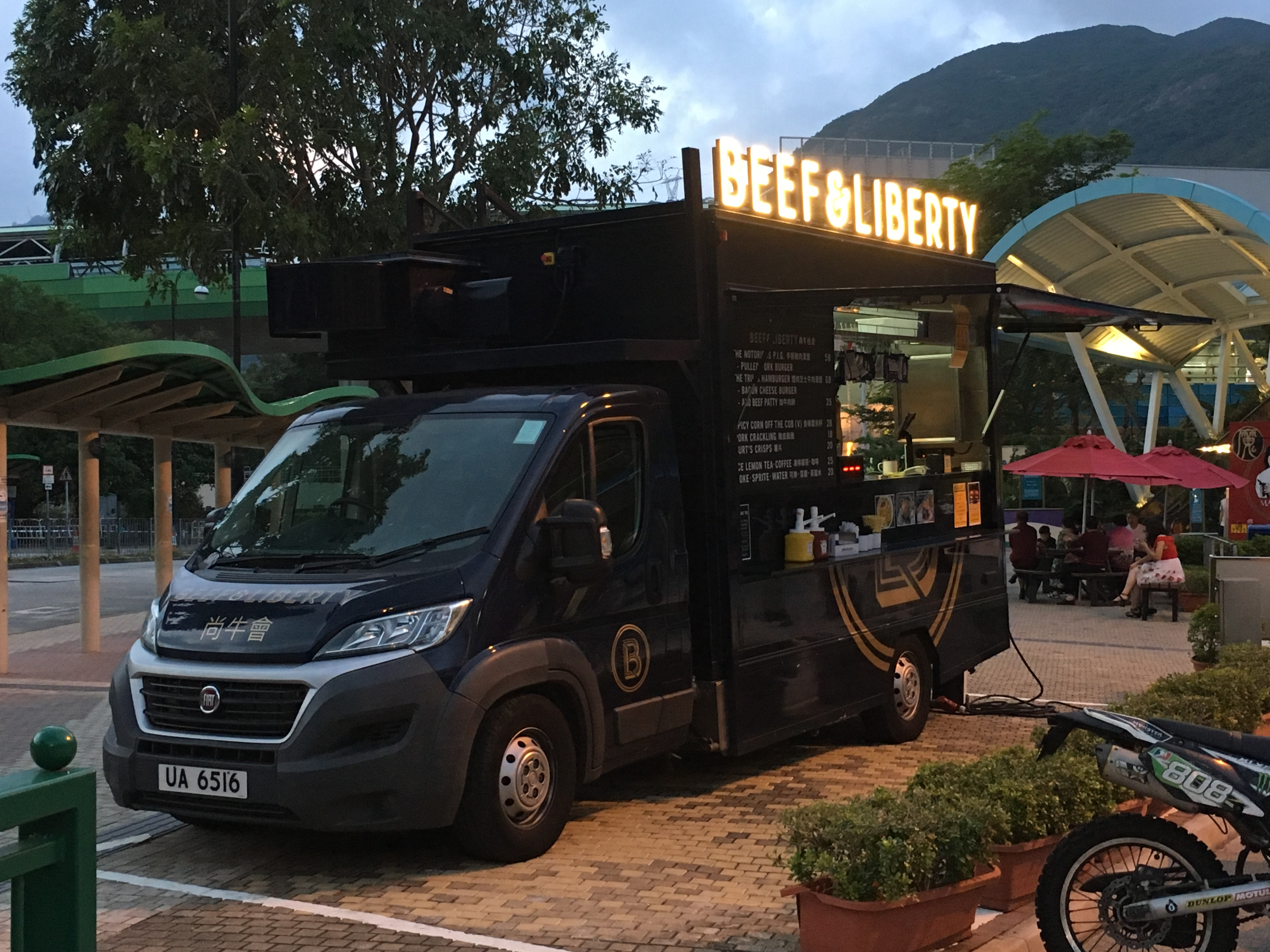
A food truck in Hong Kong

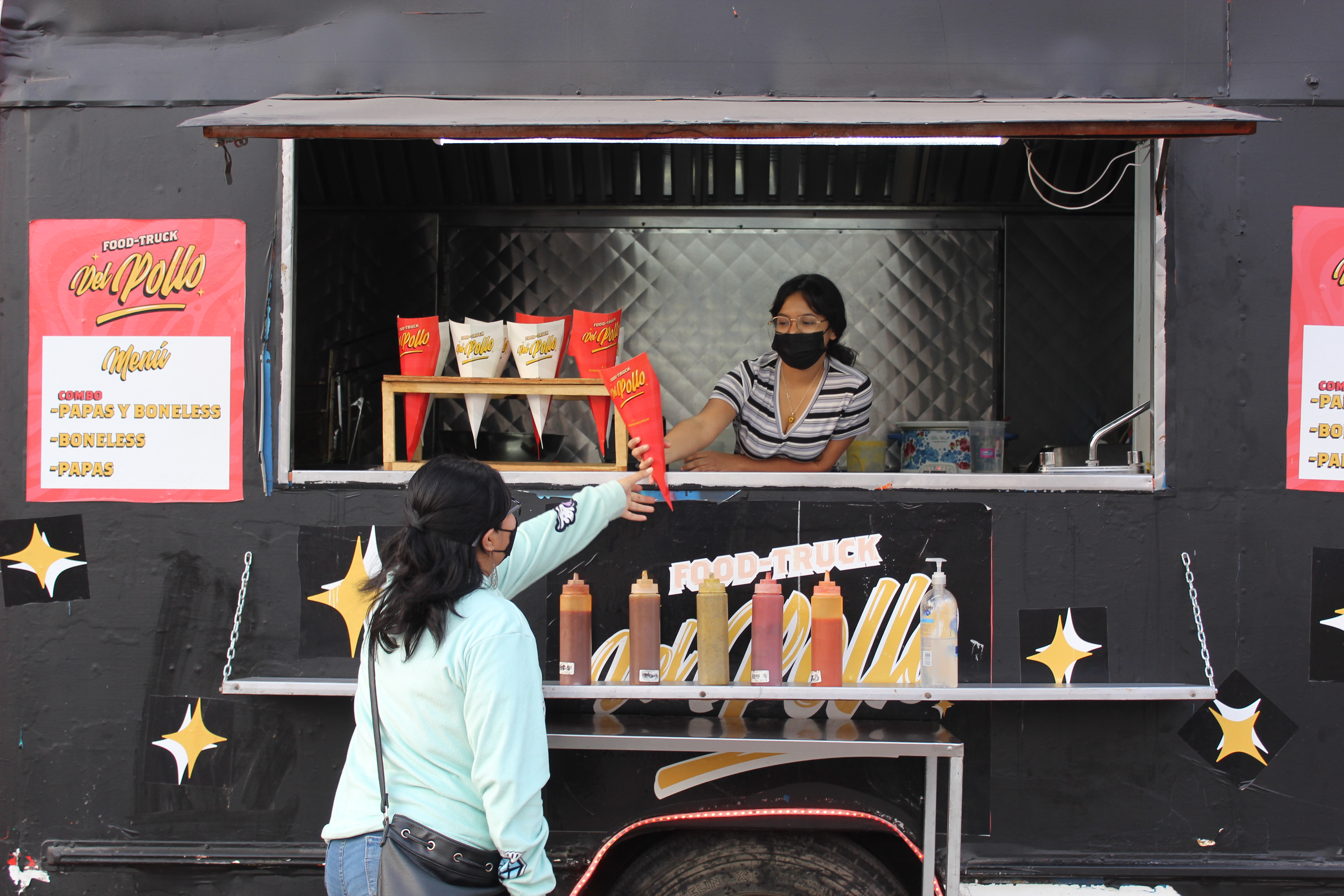
Foodtruck vendor in Monterrey, Mexico

== In popular culture ==
- Both The Great Food Truck Race (Food Network) and Eat St. (Cooking Channel) feature food trucks and mobile food carts from all over the U.S.
- On Food Network Canada, Food Truck Face Off has four teams battle for the grand prize, use of a customized food truck for one year. Also on the network, an episode of Kid in a Candy Store looks behind the scenes at a gourmet dessert truck.
- In the 2014 American comedy-drama film Chef, a high-end chef has a kitchen meltdown and rediscovers his passion for cooking while driving and operating a simple food truck across America.
- During Donald Trump's 2016 presidential campaign, Marco Gutierrez, founder of a group known as "Latinos for Trump" warned in an MSNBC interview that there would be "taco trucks on every corner" if Mexican immigration to the U.S. continued.
- Wheels on Meals, a 1984 Chinese-Spanish jointly produced comedic action martial arts movie directed by Sammo Hung, starring "Dragon Brothers" - Jackie Chan, Yuen Biao, and Sammo Hung himself as its three main protagonists, featuring a custom-made-for-the-movie Mitsubishi-produced and branded food truck vehicle named "Everybody's Kitchen" that serves as the main protagonists' primary workplace throughout the movie. The vehicle in question is actually 1983-produced style of Mitsubishi L-300 (also known as "Delica") van model in close up shots, with identically painted Toyota Dyna/HiAce (exact car model shown in the film's shots is unknown, seems to be a customized mishmash of both) serving as "stunt" substitute for some of the action scenes recorded at farther camera pans.

== See also ==
- Concession stand
- List of food trucks
- Mobile catering
- Taco stand
- Yatai (food cart)
- Chuckwagon
