= Rot phumphuang =

Type of food truck in Thailand

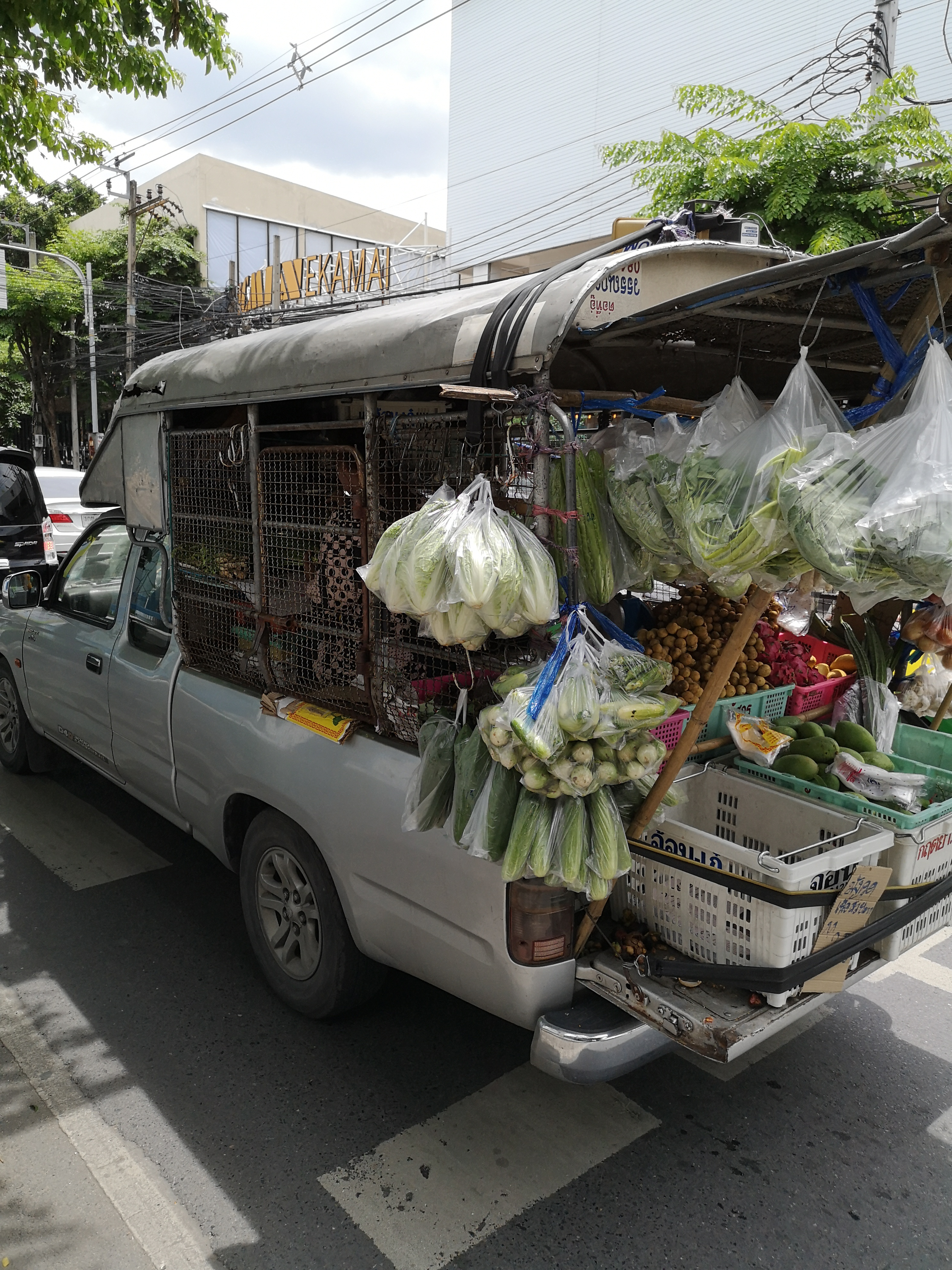
Rot phumphuang

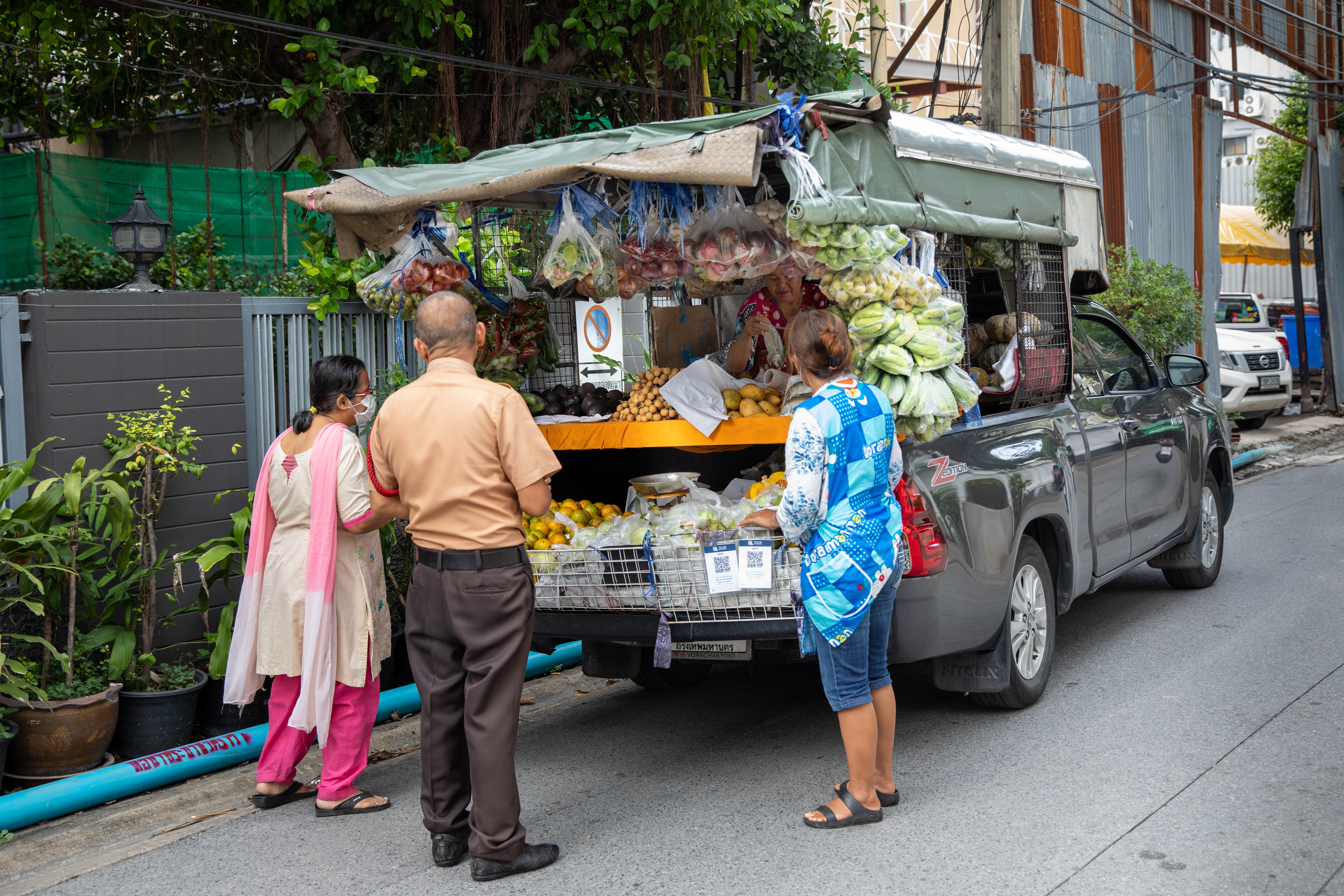
Rot phumphuang and customers

Rot phumphuang (Thai: รถพุ่มพวง, pronounced [rót pʰûm.pʰūaŋ], lit. 'bunch car'), also known as rot kapkhao (Thai: รถกับข้าว, pronounced [rót kàp.kʰâːw], lit. 'foodstuff car') is a type of pickup in Thailand which sells vegetables and foodstuffs throughout villages or communities by stopping at the homes of individual purchasers.

== Details ==
They usually sell vegetables or different types of meat, such as pork or chicken, by cutting them up and putting in plastic bags and hanging them all over the truck bed. Hence the name. Sometimes rot phumphuang might be a motorbike, or there may be other types of products that are not food items such as daily use items e.g. shoes, plastic buckets, brooms or various types of mobs, etc.

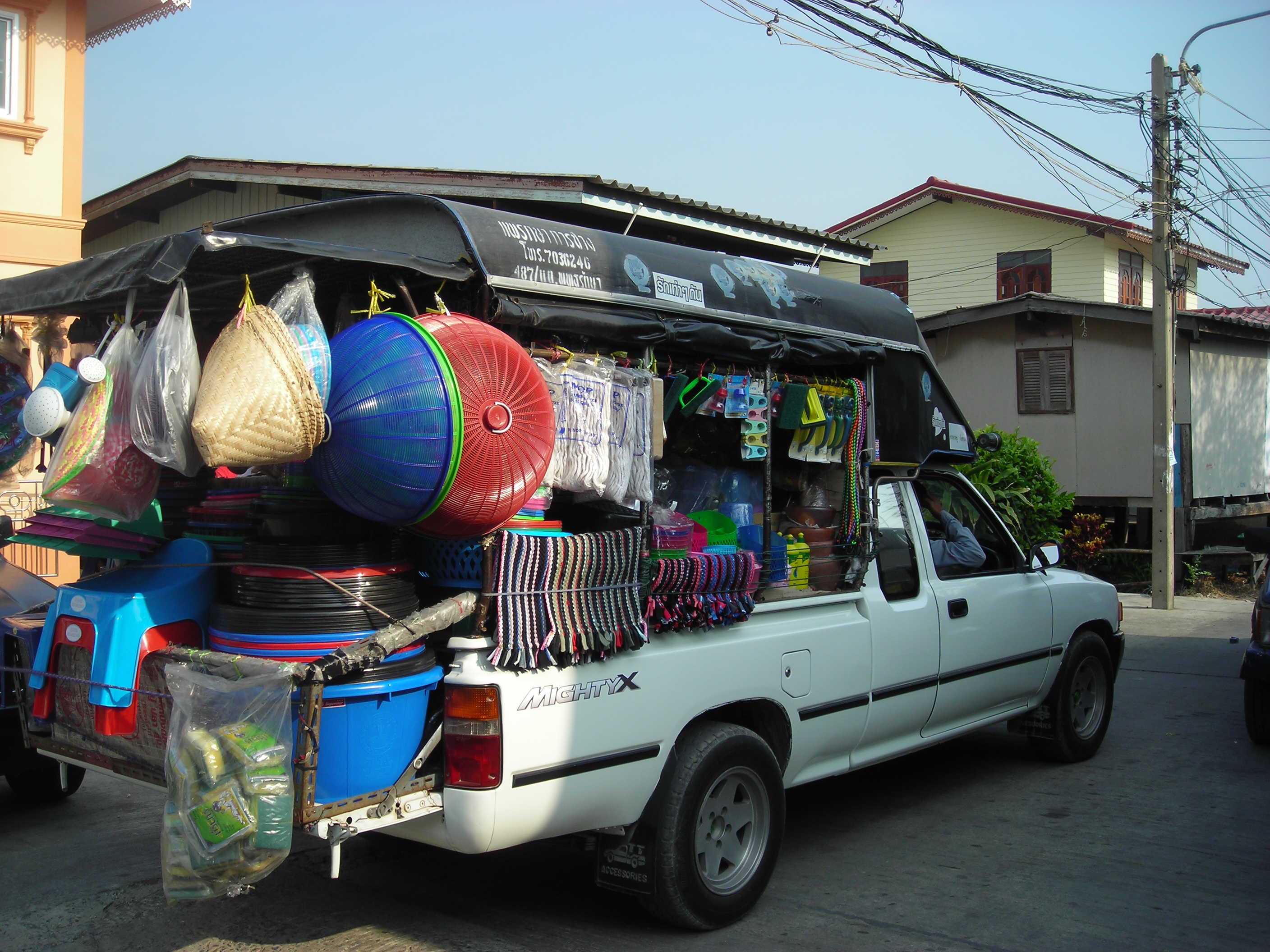
Rot phumphuang sell consumer goods

During the COVID-19 pandemic, this type of business became very popular, due to social distancing measures and various wet markets were closed by government orders.

It is assumed that rot phumphuang probably arose and became widespread during the heyday of the land allocation business, around 1988–91. When new roads were cut into the suburbs and housing development projects began with worker camps were organized, for convenience of purchasers. Another factor was the invasion of convenience stores in 1989, which had an impact on traditional groceries.

== See also ==
- Food truck
