= Food Jammers =

- Created by: Peace Point Entertainment Group
- Starring: Micah Donovan; Chris Martin; Nobu Adilman
- Country of origin: Canada
- No. of episodes: 40

Production
- Running time: 30 minutes

Original release
- Network: Food Network Canada
- Release: present

Food Jammers is a cooking show featuring Micah Donovan, Chris Martin, and Nobu Adilman; three backyard mechanics who make homebrew cooking equipment using junkyard parts, found objects, and locally sourced ingredients. Cooking is essentially an excuse for them to build things.

Inspired by an interest in music and vernacular culture, Food Jammers features a wide range of bands from the likes of Comets on Fire, Snooky Pryor, Stereolab, and Joel Plaskett.

The trio is based in Toronto, Ontario, Canada, and they often shop at local Toronto markets (like Kensington Market and St. Lawrence Market), scrap yards, and the curb-side to find things for their cooking.

Three seasons of thirteen episodes have been filmed, plus a Christmas special.

In the United States, it aired on the Cooking Channel and Halogen TV. It had also aired in Asia through the Asian Food Channel.

The series was produced by Peace Point Entertainment Group and developed and supervised by Peace Point Vice President, Vallery Hyduk.
