= Brad Goddard =

Canadian actor

- Born: Bradley David Goddard; May 17, 1977 (age 48); Lucan, Ontario, Canada

Bradley David Goddard (born May 17, 1977) is a Canadian actor.

== Early life and education ==
Goddard was born in Lucan, Ontario. His identical twin brother, Chris Goddard, is also an actor. Goddard studied theatre at the University of Waterloo. By the end of his study at Waterloo, he had appeared in 26 productions and had taught the University's Drama Department First Year acting course for three years.

== Career ==
After moving to Toronto, Ontario Goddard joined Skye Management and landed the role of Carter Travis alongside his twin brother Chris in the role of Cody Travis in the MTV series Undressed. Goddard then worked on the Canadian theatre premiere of The Laramie Project (2003), as well as an equally successful 2004 remount.

Goddard's next project was hosting a home improvement show with his brother Chris on OLN (Outdoor Life Network) called The Outhouse. The show was entirely improvised, and pitted the twins against each other in two separate exterior home renovations over the course of two days. The Outhouse won Bronze at WorldFest for "Best Reality-Based Programme"

Since moving to Calgary, Alberta, Goddard landed a principal role in Decoys 2 (now titled Decoys 2: Alien Seduction) as "Nick Dean".

Goddard is also the Vice President of Innovation, Business Development, and Government Relations for Big Rock Brewery.

== Filmography ==
=== Film ===
Year	Title	Role	Notes
2007	Decoys 2: Alien Seduction	Nick Dean	

=== Television ===
Year	Title	Role	Notes
1998	The Defenders: Taking the First	College New Reporter	Television film
2002	Undressed	Carter Travis	10 episodes
2011–2013	Scare Tactics	Various roles	5 episodes

== See also ==
- List of University of Waterloo people
