= Nobu and Mio Adilman =

Canadian actors and filmmakers

Nobu Adilman, far left.

Nobu Adilman and Mio Adilman are Canadian television personalities and brothers. The Adilmans have been involved in the film and television industry mostly as actors and writers.

They are the sons of entertainment writer Sid Adilman. and Toshiko Adilman, a Japanese translator. They are of Jewish background on their father's side.

Nobu Adilman worked as a writer on the Canadian television series Emily of New Moon and Cold Squad, and acted in the film Parsley Days. Together, the Adilmans also made the short films I Pie: A Love Story and Yoga, Man. In 2002, the Adilmans co-hosted the CBC Television series ZeD and then became co-hosts of the series SmartAsk that same year. Nobu Adilman at first was uncertain about working for SmartAsk, saying "it's not like Canada has a rich history of game shows," but was persuaded when he was told the Adilmans could be themselves on the show.

In 2004, the press noted it when the Adilmans temporarily returned to ZeD to co-host a five-hour special called Zed Uncut, which was shot live. (They were substituting for regular host Sharon Lewis). In 2005, the Adilmans appeared together in Trailer Park Boys as the fictional drug dealers Terry and Dennis. In March 2007, Nobu Adilman hosted the series Food Jammers. Mio Adilman more recently appeared in Hannibal and The Strain. Nobu Adilman is also a founding member of Toronto's Choir! Choir! Choir!
