= Food Truck Face Off =

Canadian television series

Food Truck Face Off is a Canadian reality based cooking competition series produced by Peace Point Entertainment Group and created by Vallery Hyduk. The series was hosted by Jesse Palmer and it aired on Food Network and Food Network Canada between 2014 and 2015. Each episode had an initial "pitch" session where four teams of two presented their signature dishes to a panel of judges. Two of these teams were selected to compete on Food Trucks in their city. The team who had the highest sales in their episode won a food truck for one year.

== Shooting Locations ==
Episodes were filmed in various cities in North America including Austin, Miami, Los Angeles, Niagara Falls and Toronto.
