= Pancho Villa (disambiguation) =

Pancho Villa (1878–1923) was a Mexican revolutionary general.

Pancho Villa may also refer to:

== People ==
- Pancho Villa (boxer) (1901–1925), a Filipino professional boxer

== Places ==
- Pancho Villa State Park, a National Historic Landmark District

== Arts, media, & entertainment ==
- Pancho Villa (film), a 1972 spaghetti western film directed by Eugenio Martin

== Other uses ==
- Pancho Villa Expedition, a U.S. military operation during the Mexican Revolution
- Pancho Villa (restaurant), a Finland-based Tex Mex restaurant
