= List of Tex-Mex restaurants =

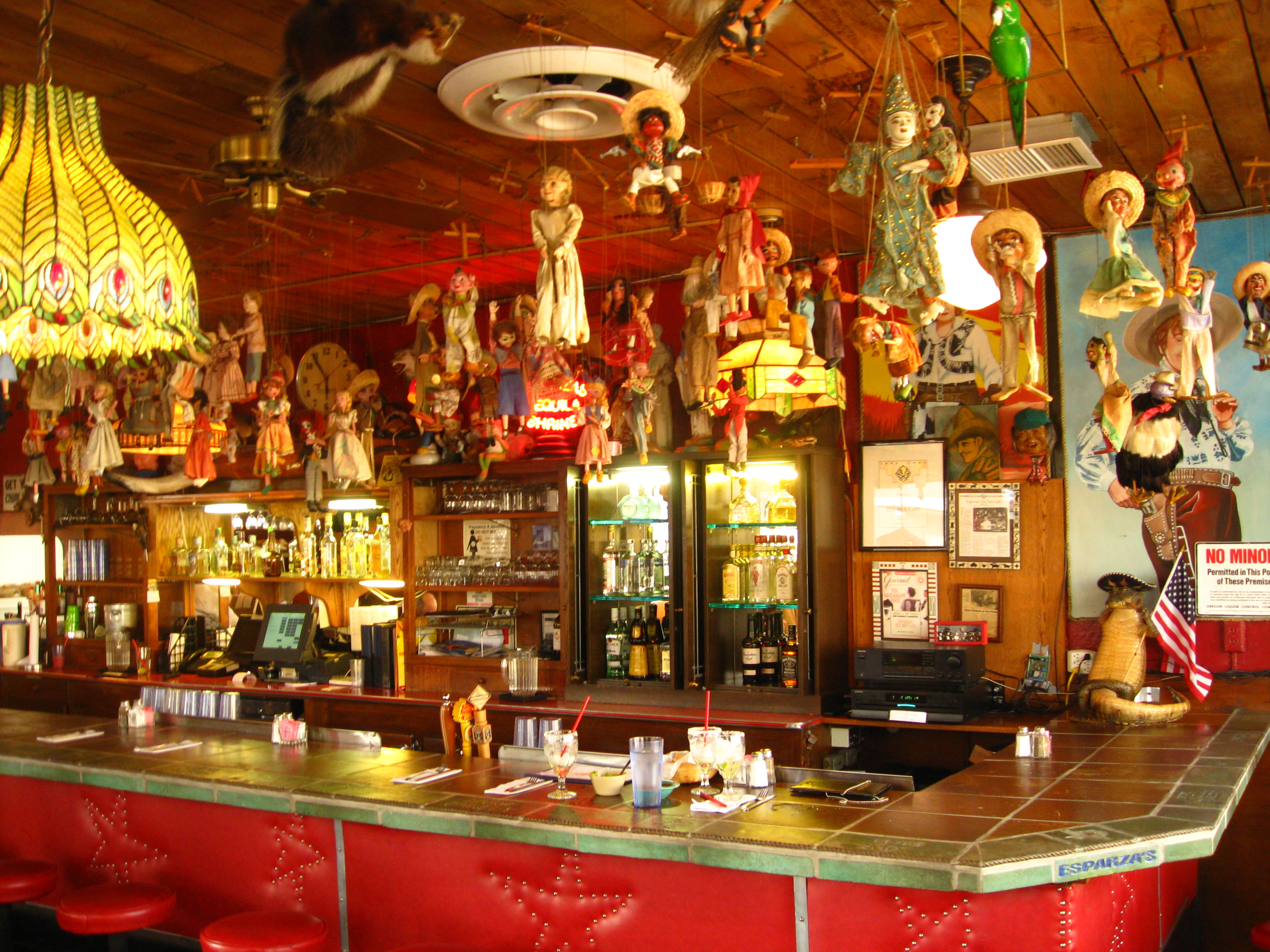
Interior of Esparza's in Portland, Oregon, U.S., in 2008

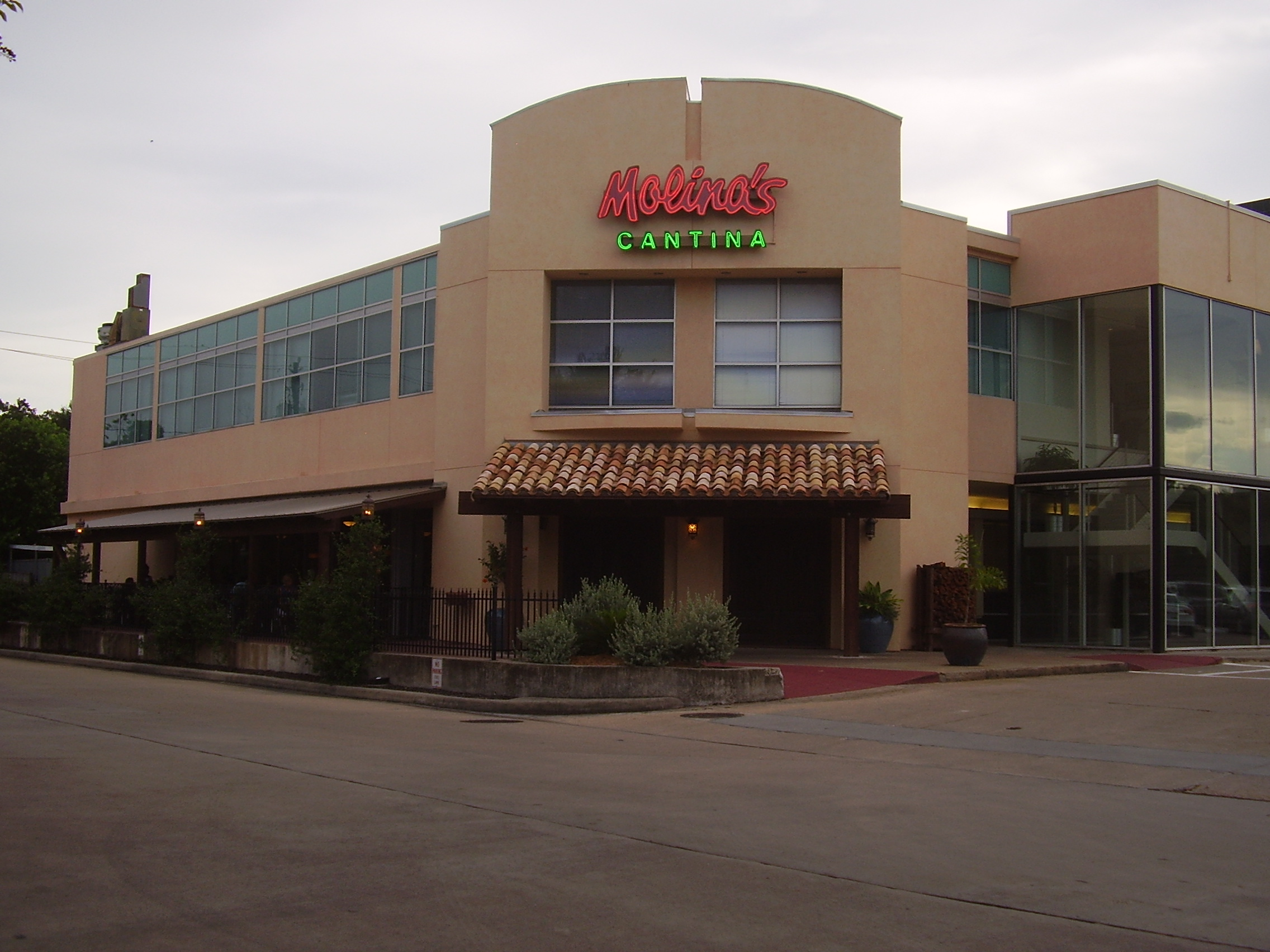
Exterior of a Molina's Cantina restaurant in Houston, Texas, U.S.

Following is a list of notable restaurants known for serving Tex-Mex:

- Baja Fresh
- Bridges Cafe, Portland, Oregon, U.S.
- BurritoVille
- Chapultepec Lupita, Houston, Texas, U.S.
- Chevys Fresh Mex
- Chi-Chi's
- Chili's
- Chipotle Mexican Grill
- Chuy's
- Del Taco
- Don Pablo's
- El Chupacabra, Seattle
- El Pollo Loco (Mexico, United States)
- El Torito
- Esparza's, Portland, Oregon, U.S.
- Jackalope, Seattle
- La Bamba Mexican Restaurant
- La Salsa
- Lupe Tortilla
- Maggie Rita's, Houston, Texas, U.S.
- Magnolia Cafe, Austin, Texas, U.S.
- Mi Cocina, Dallas, Texas, U.S.
- Moe's Southwest Grill
- Molina's Cantina, Houston, Texas, U.S.
- Nacho Borracho, Seattle
- Ninfa's
- The Oasis on Lake Travis, Austin, Texas
- On the Border Mexican Grill & Cantina
- Pancho Villa
- Panther City BBQ
- Pappasito's Cantina
- Qdoba
- Taco Bell
- Taco Cabana
- The Goose, Portland, Oregon, U.S.
- Tia's Tex-Mex
- Tijuana Flats
- Torchy's Tacos
- Tortilla Coast, Washington, D.C., U.S.
- Wahoo's Fish Taco
