= El Chupacabra (restaurant) =

Restaurant in Seattle, Washington, U.S.

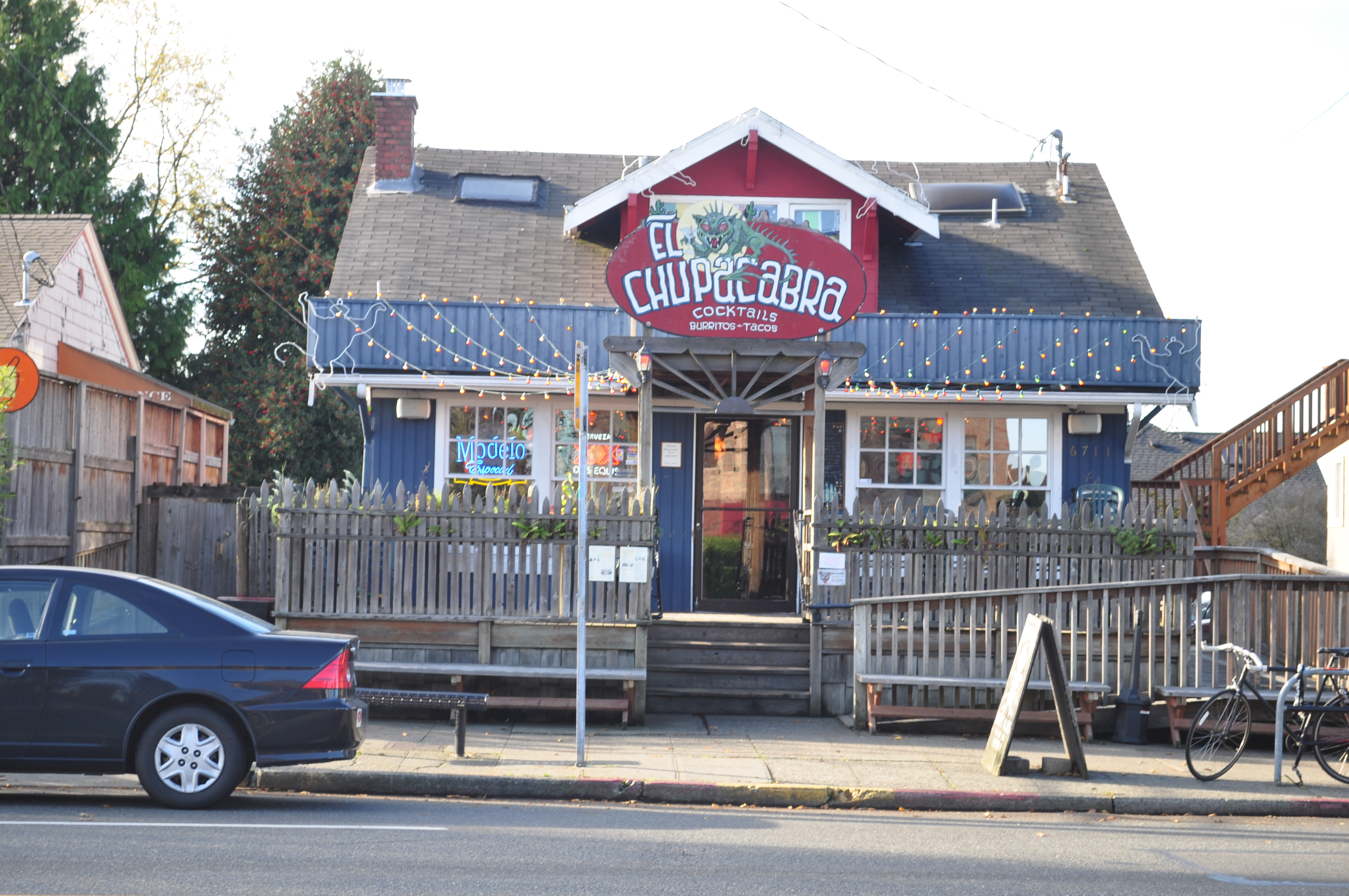
- Exterior of the restaurant in the Greenwood / Phinney Ridge area, 2015
- Interactive map of El Chupacabra

Restaurant information
- Established: 2005
- Owner: Aaron Wright
- Previous owner: James Hardy
- Food type: Mexican; Tex-Mex
- Location: 6711 Greenwood Avenue North; 2620 Alki Avenue Southwest, Seattle, Washington, United States
- Coordinates: 47.6782°N 122.3556°W
- Website: elchupacabraseattle.com

El Chupacabra is a Mexican / Tex-Mex restaurant with two locations in Seattle, Washington. The business operates in the Greenwood / Phinney Ridge area, and along Alki Beach Park in West Seattle. Previously, a third location operated in South Lake Union, until 2018.

== Description ==
El Chupacabra is a Day of the Dead-themed Mexican / Tex-Mex restaurant with two locations in Seattle: along Greenwood Avenue the Greenwood / Phinney Ridge area, and along Alki Beach Park in West Seattle. Previously, a third location operated in South Lake Union. The business is named after the legendary creature in American folklore.

The Alki location, described by Eater Seattle as a "punk-themed Mexican dive bar", occupies a beachfront building along Alki Avenue Southwest and has stairs to a balcony with views of Elliott Bay. Thrillist has said the "swanky" outpost has a "million-dollar" view. The interior has dark red walls, a full bar, booth seating, paper lamps, and wall art depicting skeletons. A sign made from Guerrero state license plates says, "Save Water, Drink Tequila". The Alki location also has a jukebox and a salsa buffet.

The Greenwood and Alki restaurants have patios. The Greenwood location also has outdoor seating (as did the South Lake Union location, before closing).

=== Menu ===
El Chupacabra's menu has included burritos, nachos, tacos al pastor, rice and beans, tortilla chips with guacamole and salsa, horchata, and margaritas. The restaurant has also served enchiladas, fried jalapeños, huevos rancheros, pozole with pork, quesadillas, tortas, and black-bean dip. The "Texas Tacos" are soft tacos with flour tortillas. Salsa varieties include chipotle pineapple, roja, and verde. El Chupacabra has gluten-free as well as vegan- and vegetarian-friendly options. The restaurant has offered a happy hour menu with food and drinks specials.

== History ==
El Chupacabra was established in 2005. Aaron Wright is the owner. Previously, James Hardy was a co-owner. The patio of the Greenwood / Phinney Ridge restaurant was given a pergola and heaters in 2018. All three locations had events or specials in conjunction with Cinco de Mayo in 2018. The Greenwood / Pinney Ridge and Alki locations operated via take-out during the COVID-19 pandemic.

=== Outposts ===
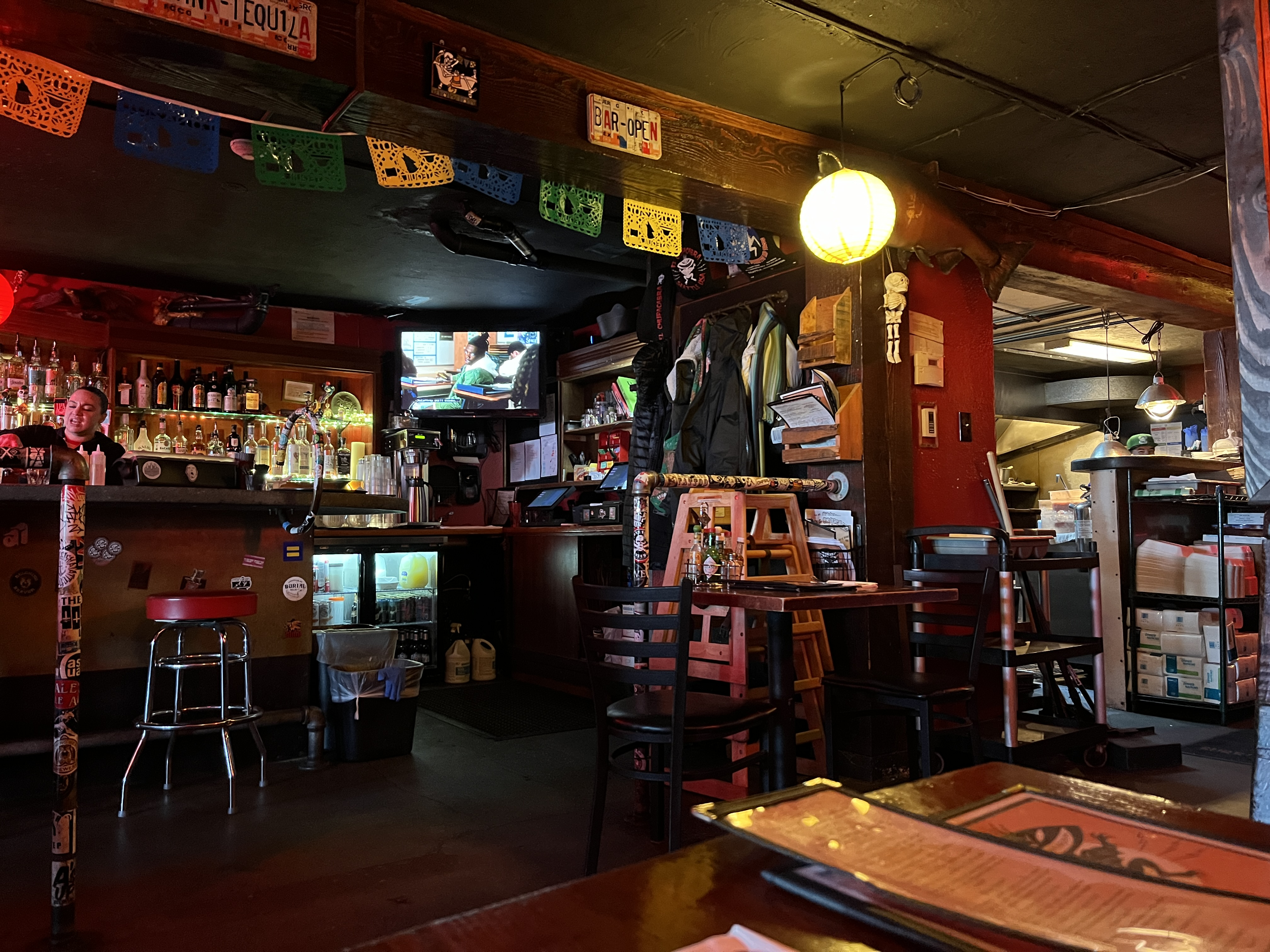
The interior of the West Seattle location in 2023

The Alki location opened in April 2011.

In 2015, an approximately 4,000-square-foot outpost opened in South Lake Union. The restaurant's seating capacity was 200 people and, according to Eater Seattle, had "the same festively dark decor and loud music" as the other two locations. The restaurant operated in Chandler's Cove, a development created from the Lone Star Cement site in and Henry Pier. The outpost closed on September 16, 2018, as the building was slated for demolition. According to The Stranger, El Chupacabra personnel were aware of this possibility when a lease was signed.

== Reception ==
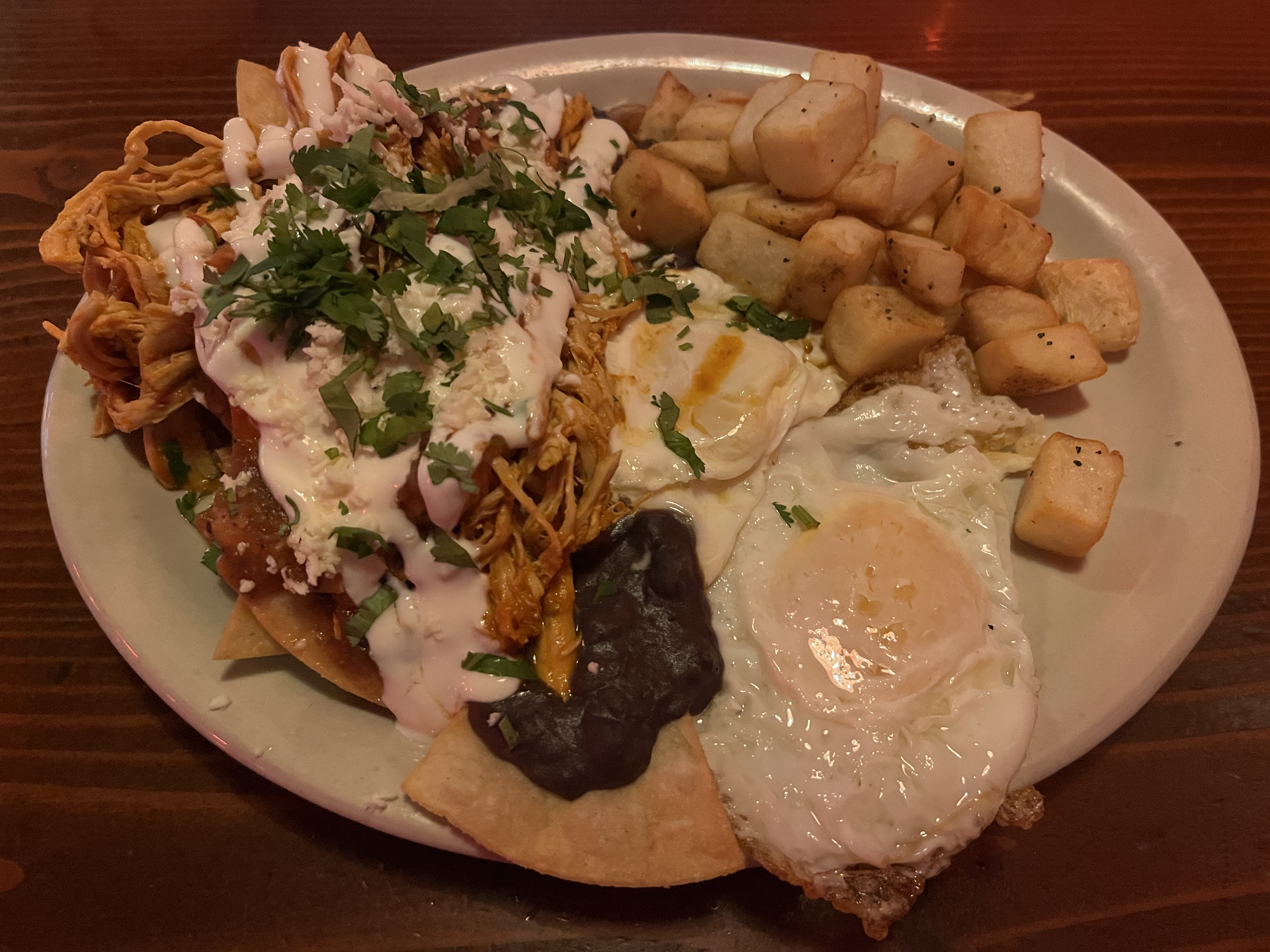
Chilaquiles at the restaurant in West Seattle, 2023

The Not for Tourists Guide to Seattle has called El Chupacabra's food and margaritas "frighteningly delicious". Lonely Planet Seattle said the food "probably wouldn't be described as authentic" but is "still pretty darned good". The guide has also said of the Alki location: "On Saturday nights this place is buzzing with 20-somethings chatting over drinks and guacamole. Expect a wait, and to make friends at the bar while waiting." One published walking guide of Seattle called the food "creative".

Eater Seattle included El Chupacabra in a 2013 "epic guide on where to take vegetarians out to eat" in the city. In 2017, the website's Leonardo David Raymundo included the Alki location in a list of "low-stakes" first date establishments in the city. Chona Kasinger included El Chupacabra in Thrillist's 2014 list of Alki's eight best eateries. The restaurant was given "honorable mention" in the Best Mexican category of Seattle Weekly's annual readers' poll in 2016.

== See also ==
- List of dive bars
- List of Mexican restaurants
- List of restaurant chains in the United States
- List of Tex-Mex restaurants
