= Jackalope (disambiguation) =

Jackalope is a mythical animal and a cross between a jackrabbit and an antelope, goat or deer.

Jackalope may also refer to:

== Music ==
- Jackalope, a band of contemporary Native American music artists headed by Tucson-based R. Carlos Nakai
- Jakalope, a Canadian band
- "Jackalope", a song by Colonel Claypool's Bucket of Bernie Brains from the album The Big Eyeball in the Sky
- "Jackalope", a song by Shonen Knife from the album Happy Hour
- "Chocolate Jackalope", a song by Dance Gavin Dance from the album Mothership

== Computing ==
- Jaunty Jackalope, version 9.04 of Ubuntu released in April 2009
- Jackalope is an open source PHP implementation of the JCR API

== Sports ==
- Odessa Jackalopes, a junior hockey team in the NAHL
- Odessa Jackalopes (1997–2011), a minor league hockey team in the CHL

== Other ==
- The Jackalope a 2003 short film starring Leighton Meester
- Jackalope (restaurant), a restaurant in Seattle
