= Bolner's Fiesta Products =

Texas spice company

- Product type: Spices
- Country: United States
- Introduced: 1955; 71 years ago
- Markets: American Southwest, primarily Texas
- Website: fiestaspices.com

Bolner's Fiesta Products is a spice company based out of San Antonio, Texas.

The company was founded in 1955 by Clifton Bolner, focusing primarily on Tex-Mex and Mexican spices. The spices are a well known staple across Texas kitchens.

In 2014, the brand was named a Texas treasure, recognized as a "historic Texas business".
