= Esparza's =

Defunct Tex-Mex restaurant in Portland, Oregon, U.S.

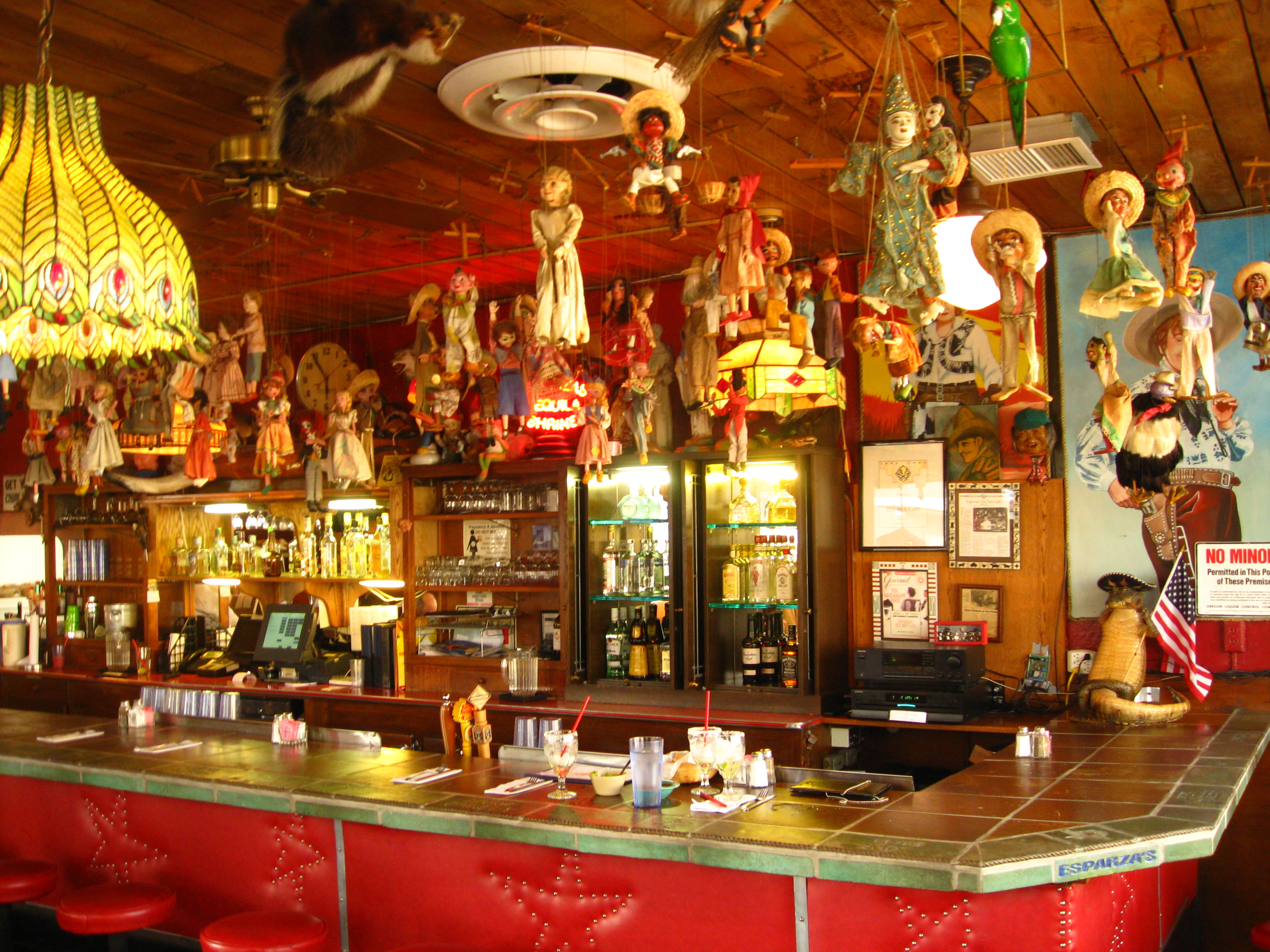
- The restaurant's interior in 2008
- Interactive map of Esparza's

Restaurant information
- Established: 1990
- Closed: January 2014
- Food type: Tex-Mex
- Dress code: Casual
- Location: 2725 Southeast Ankeny St., Portland, Oregon, Multnomah, Oregon, 97214, United States
- Coordinates: 45.52225°N 122.63755°W
- Reservations: No

Esparza's Tex Mex Cafe, or simply Esparza's, was a Tex-Mex restaurant in Portland, Oregon, in the United States. Opened by Martha and Joe Esparza in 1990, the restaurant operated for more than 24 years before closing in January 2014. Its unusual menu included buffalo tostadas, ground ostrich and nopalitos, several varieties of tongue, beef brisket, and more traditional options such as enchiladas, quesadillas, tacos and tamales. Esparza's was one of Portland's most popular restaurants during the 1990s and was named "Restaurant of the Year" by The Oregonian in 1992.

== Description and history ==
Esparza's, located at the intersection of SE 28th Avenue and SE Ankeny Street in Portland's Buckman neighborhood, served Tex-Mex cuisine. Opening in 1990, it became one of Portland's most popular restaurants. The Portland Mercury described Esparza's as a "quaint little cafe" with "interesting" menu options, including buffalo tostadas, ground ostrich and nopalitos (cactus deep-fried in cornmeal batter). It served several varieties of tongue, including beef, buffalo, calf, lamb, pork and venison. The menu also included beef brisket ("Smiley Burnette") and more traditional options such as enchiladas, quesadillas, tacos and tamales, with most entrees ranging from $9–11. The most expensive entree on the menu cost $12.95, making Esparza's known for its reasonable pricing.

The restaurant's owners, Martha and Joe Esparza, shared four of their recipes with The Oregonian between 1990 and 2002. Joe's recipe for "Texas-Style Chili Colorado" was based on one his mother made during his childhood in Uvalde, Texas. His mother disliked short-cut cooking and instead used ground chilies and other seasonings. Joe used a similar method, and his recipe was considered one of Esparza's signature dishes. In 1994, Martha shared her recipe for "Sudie Mae's Sweet Potato Pecan Pie", which came from her mother, who would make it on Sundays while growing up in Mineola, Texas. Joe's "Nopalito Ranchero" recipe, which he shared with The Oregonian in 1996, became popular after guests "got over their squeamishness over eating cactus leaves". The recipe for "Turkey Guiso a la Tex-Mex" (guiso is a type of stew), was shared in 2002 and has been recommended for utilizing leftover Thanksgiving turkey. Esparza's "Dirty Bird" recipe was shared on the Food Network's The Best Of: Spicy Foods.

=== Closure ===
In January 2014, the restaurant was closed temporarily for renovations, with no timeline offered for the project. The Oregonian also reported that the restaurant's phone number was disconnected and its website inactive. Signage confirmed the closure, stating: "Esparza's will be temporarily closed while renovating and regrouping. Thank you for your patience. We will re-open soon." However, several days later, the owners confirmed the restaurant's permanent closure, posting a note that said: "We have closed our business after 24 years. We would like to thank you for supporting us. We have enjoyed the friendships made over the years. We are starting a new chapter in our lives – relaxing and enjoying life. Thank you for your support." The Oregonian published an article containing memories of the restaurant submitted by readers. Esparza's was replaced by The Blue Goose (which later became known as simply The Goose), a "Southwestern-grill-meets-New-Mexico" restaurant serving Mexican and Tex-Mex cuisine, named after the neighborhood tavern of similar title that occupied the building.

== Reception ==
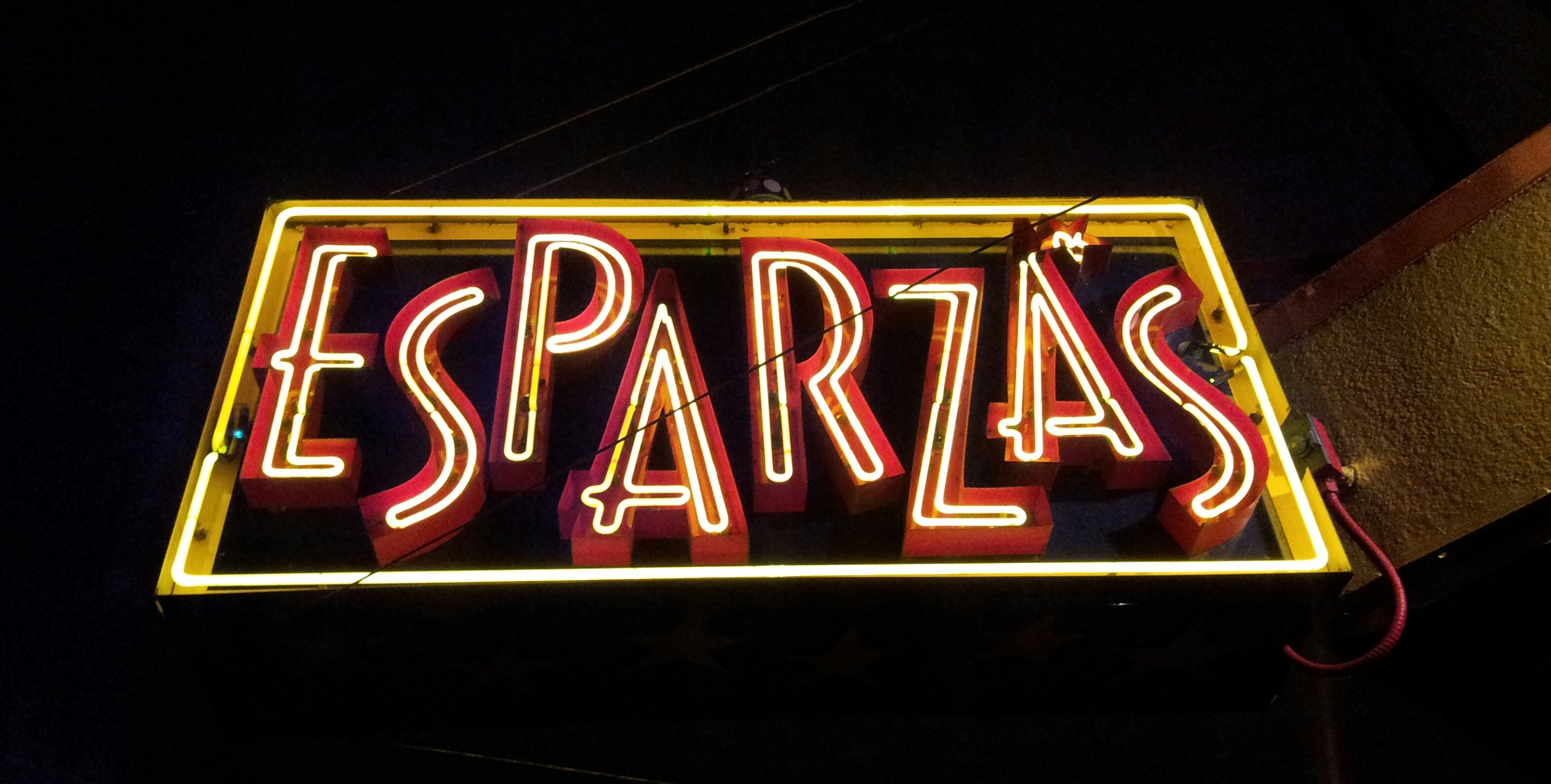
Exterior signage in 2014

The restaurant received a mostly positive reception, including "glowing" reviews in Bon Appétit and The New York Times. In 1992, Esparza's was named The Oregonian's "Restaurant of the Year". According to the paper, the restaurant played an important role in developing NE and SE 28th Avenue as a food destination. Portland Monthly called the food "so-so", but noted its menu, outdoor patio and jukebox, encouraging people to "bask in the indecipherable harmonies of norteño polka crackling from the vintage vinyl-and-neon Wurlitzer".

Esparza's was highlighted in numerous travel guides of Portland. Fodor's published, "Be prepared for south-of-the-border craziness at this beloved local eatery. Wild West kitsch festoons the walls, but it isn't any wilder than some of the entrées that emerge from chef-owner Joe Esparza's kitchen." In her book Insiders' Guide to Portland, Oregon, Rachel Dresbeck called the menu "spicy, flavorful, and tantalizingly aromatic", and described the atmosphere as "1950s Texas soda shop—just the right accent to complement the hearty fare". Yahoo! Travel called the restaurant "fun, wild and woolly", offering food "in the true tradition of the Lone Star State". Yahoo! recommended the chile rellenos, ostrich enchiladas, or nopalito for a unique dining experience.

The restaurant did not receive universal acclaim, however. In a negative review for The Portland Mercury in 2000, Robin Rosenberg wrote:

... one expects the food at Esparza's to be something special; You might think that the line trickling out the door on a Thursday night is an indication of exceptional Tex-Mex, worth a considerable sum. Well, certainly, Esparza's dècor, an amalgam of Western nostalgia, Texan brawn, and Tijuana cheese is executed with flair. Unfortunately though, no thematic coup can compensate for the fact that Esparza's food rarely exceeds mediocre, and never lives up to its price... The bulk of the clientele resides in a comfortable economic bracket and come down to the gritty Eastside to quaff top shelf margaritas and feast on manic kitsch. The hot corn chips and fresh salsa, which come fast and free, are the height of the meal. Smoked salmon enchiladas are just wrong; No quantity of barbecue sauce (in this case, cloying and acrid) is going to improve a tough, dry brisket. The pork tacos are equally dry, but the ground buffalo enchiladas are very macho and spicy (though they will linger painfully)... The beans and rice that accompany most entrees are utterly flavorless, a gratuitous use of space on the plate. Some people like beans and rice; Esparza's doesn't seem to care. It's a troublesome adage, 'you get what you pay for,' when you've gorged on flash and formula—and yet, you're starved for a good meal.

Following the restaurant's closure, The Oregonian's Grant Butler called the run that it had "remarkable". He recalled, "[W]hen Esparza's opened in 1990, it broke the mold of what Mexican fare in Portland could be. Instead of combination plates blanketed in shrouds of sour cream and melted cheddar, Esparza's served dishes that few people in Portlanders [sic] had ever experienced at the time".

== See also ==
- Hispanics and Latinos in Portland, Oregon
- List of Tex-Mex restaurants
