= Chapultepec Lupita =

Tex-Mex restaurant in Houston, Texas, U.S.

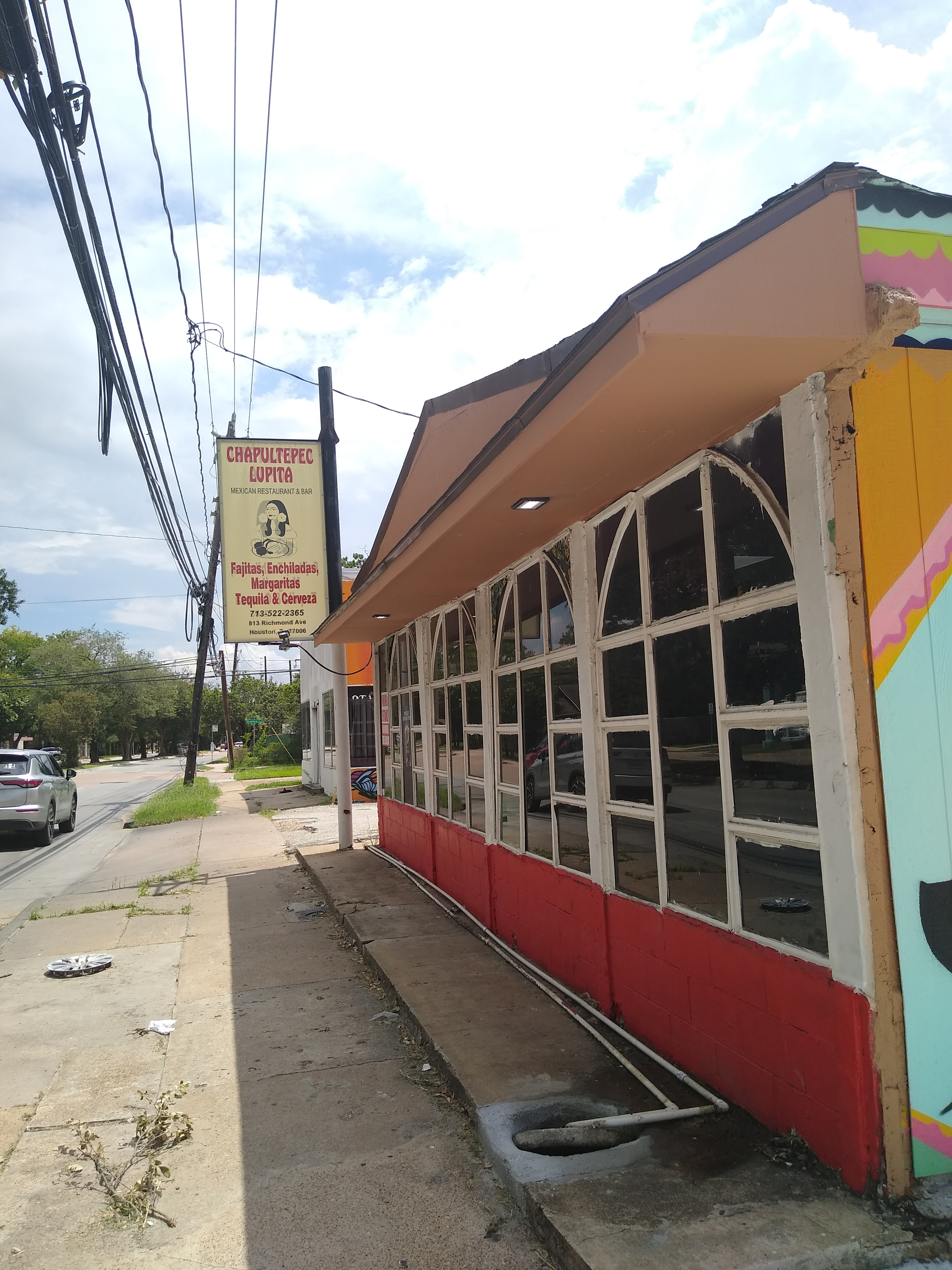
- The restaurant's exterior, 2022
- Interactive map of Chapultepec Lupita

Restaurant information
- Location: 813 Richmond Avenue, Houston, Harris, Texas, 77006, United States
- Coordinates: 29.73433°N 95.38958°W

Chapultepec Lupita is a Tex-Mex restaurant in Houston, in the U.S. state of Texas.

== Description ==
Chapultepec Lupita is a Tex-Mex restaurant operating in a "funky old house that seems to go on forever", according to the Houston Press. Located in Houston's Montrose neighborhood, the restaurant has been described as "an institution for the all-night crowd looking for a late-night/early-morning hangover cure". The menu includes alambres, chilaquiles, enchiladas, huevos rancheros, mole sauce, quesadillas, Mediterranean-style salmon, tortilla-crusted snapper, tamales, and pecan cheesecake. The drink menu has approximately 60 tequilas and 20 margarita varieties.

== Reception ==
Eric Sandler included the restaurant in Eater Houston's 2013 list of 16 "classic" greasy spoons. Chapultepec was included in the Houston Chronicle's 2016 list of best restaurant salsas.

== See also ==
- List of Tex-Mex restaurants
- Tex-Mex cuisine in Houston
