= Magnolia Cafe =

Tex-Mex restaurant in Austin, Texas, U.S.

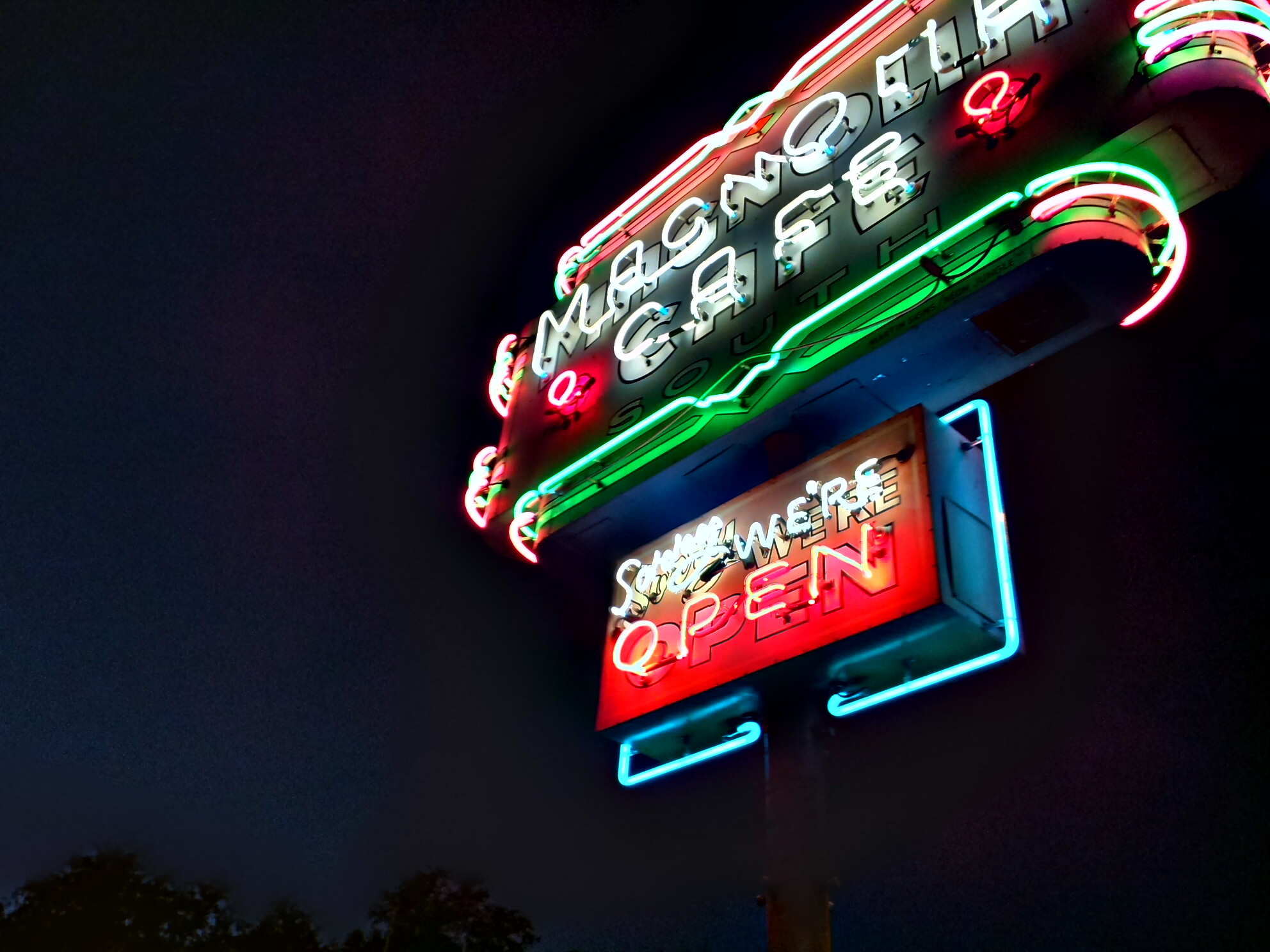
- Interactive map of Magnolia Cafe

Restaurant information
- Established: 1979
- Food type: American; Tex-Mex
- Location: 1920 South Congress Ave, Austin, Texas, United States
- Coordinates: 30°14′40.54″N 97°45′5.1″W
- Website: magnoliacafeaustin.com

Magnolia Cafe is a restaurant with one active location in Austin, Texas. The restaurant originally opened on Lake Austin Boulevard as Omelettry West in 1979, and became known as Magnolia Cafe during 1986–1987. A second location on South Congress Avenue opened in 1988. The Lake Austin location closed during the 2020 COVID-19 pandemic, with the remaining South Congress location operating with reduced hours. Both locations formerly operated 24/7.

Magnolia Cafe serves breakfast as well as Tex-Mex entrees like enchiladas and spinach lasagna and quesadillas, migas, pancakes, and potato scrambles.

== See also ==
- COVID-19 pandemic in Texas
- Impact of the COVID-19 pandemic on the restaurant industry in the United States
- List of Diners, Drive-Ins and Dives episodes
- List of Tex-Mex restaurants
