= Maggie Rita's =

Restaurant in Houston, Texas, United States

- Industry: Restaurant
- Genre: Tex-Mex
- Founded: Houston, Texas
- Founders: Carlos Mencia, Santiago Moreno, David Quintanilla
- Headquarters: Houston, Texas, U.S.
- Areas served: Houston, Texas
- Key people: Tony Shannard (operator)
- Website: www.maggierita.com

Maggie Rita's Tex-Mex Grill & Bar is a Tex-Mex restaurant in Houston. For several years, Maggie Rita's was a restaurant chain with a license co-owned by Carlos Mencia and Santiago Moreno of Suave Restaurant. In January 2013, Moreno closed the last two locations they owned. Tony Shannard owns the only remaining Maggie Rita's restaurant, which is situated in Houston's JPMorgan Chase Tower.

== History ==
Carlos Mencia had an interest in food, and his friends suggested that he make a business out of it. Mencia met Santiago Moreno, a restaurateur, who suggested that the two of them start a restaurant chain. Mencia partnered with Moreno, who along with David Quintanilla, was one of the two principals of the Restaurant Resource Management Group, to open Maggie Rita's. The first Maggie Rita's opened was located in the Galleria area of Houston. T.J. Aulds of the Galveston County Daily News characterized the opening as a "test run" and Mencia said that "We learned a lot from that experience. We tweaked a lot of things from what we learned there."

Shortly after Hurricane Katrina hit New Orleans, Maggie Rita's opened in that city. Around 2007 a former Houlihan's location in Houston was replaced with Maggie Rita's. Allison Wollam of the Houston Business Journal called the restaurant "a new upscale Mexican food concept." In 2009 Syd Kearney of 29-95 said that Maggie Rita's was an "upscale Tex-Mex sports bar." The Maggie Rita's in Galveston, Texas opened on July 29, 2010 in the Armour & Co. building in The Strand district. The Galveston location was the number three Maggie Rita's. Maggie Rita's had replaced a Fuddrucker's location. Laura Elder of The Galveston County Daily News said "some saw it as a strong sign of Hurricane Ike recovery and welcome investment in the island’s downtown." By January 2012 the restaurant in Galveston had closed.

In mid-2012, the three remaining franchised Ninfa's locations owned by Santiago Moreno, in the Kirby Drive area, the Galleria area, and the Interstate 45 Gulf Freeway area, were converted into Maggie Rita's. Katharine Shilcutt of the Houston Press rated the food at the new restaurants negatively and said that "[i]t represents a new nadir for a once-respected and beloved Houston Tex-Mex institution." Shilcutt further added that the takeover caused an "uproar" in Houston and that "to many longtime Houstonians (me [sic] included), the deal with interloper Maggie Rita's may as well have been a pact with the devil."

As of April 2013 only one Maggie Rita's restaurant remains in operation.

== Locations ==
The chain had locations in Houston, Galveston, and New Orleans. The Galveston and New Orleans locations closed by 2012. The restaurant's Houston locations included Travis Street/Downtown (the J.P. Morgan Chase Tower in Downtown Houston), Galleria (Uptown Houston, near The Galleria), Hobby (near Hobby Airport), Heights (on Shepherd Drive, near Houston Heights), and Upper Kirby.

The Kirby location closed in November 2012. The Galleria location closed the following month. In January 2013, due to rising rents, the Heights location closed. The closures led to 60 employees losing their jobs. Tony Shannard operates the Maggie Rita's in Downtown under a licensing agreement. As of that month, he planned to open another Downtown Maggie Rita's within 30 days, but as of January 2019 the Maggie Rita's website lists only one location. The former Kirby location became the new location of the Houston-area Tex-Mex restaurant Pico's.

== Concept ==
Santiago Moreno said that the chain differs heavily from Ninfa's, with emphasis on less-filling food and margaritas. Moreno said that the customers "are old Taco Bell clients who grew up with Taco Bell as Mexican food" and that "[t]heir palates don't appreciate what we grew up with as Mexican food." Moreno said that Ninfa's served a "heavy product" which a "strong" person would be able to eat on two occasions in a week, while with Maggie Rita's offers a "lighter" product that can easily be consumed on two or three occasions in a week. Moreno added that "consumer decisions are made by women" and he concluded that "what makes a woman decide where to eat Mexican food [ . . . ] has to do with margaritas[ ; it ] has nothing to do with food."

Katharine Shilcutt of the Houston Press criticized Moreno's statements, arguing that by "catering to the lowest common denominator", the chain is allowing the food quality to suffer, and furthermore by "underestimating a market like Houston, which is saturated with excellent Tex-Mex restaurants, and [ which contains ] a consumer base possessed of a smart, experienced palate that will only suffer through a bowl of garlic-and-tomato salsa once, never to return again", the chain's restaurants would not succeed in the Greater Houston area.

At the Shepherd Drive location in Houston, patrons parking on the premises were required to use a valet service.

== Reception ==
Shilcutt characterized the menu as "a jumbled, pan-Latin menu" which includes fajitas, chips and salsa, queso flameado, arepas, chimichangas, "Ecuadorian ceviche" (similar to campechana) and "deconstructed salmon tamales." The restaurant chain has several varieties of margaritas and cocktails. She said that Maggie Rita's was not well received in Houston because Mencia was not a Texan or a Mexican and because it had taken over Ninfa's locations. Eric Sandler of Houston Eater said that after the 2012 conversion of some Ninfa's locations in Houston, some internet users reacted negatively to the new restaurant, while one argued that the food was "better than expected." Shilcutt reviewed the restaurant on Shepherd Drive in Houston and gave a very negative review of the food, arguing that it had a bad flavor and was overpriced. In 2012 Shilcutt said that "Maggie Rita's served none of the old Ninfa's recipes, but served its own ham-fisted versions of Tex-Mex food that somehow cost even more than the already overpriced Ninfa's that came before." She also said that "[t]he takeover of three Ninfa's locations in Houston by Maggie Rita's represents the latest and possibly saddest chapter in the Tex-Mex chain's history, and certainly the nadir of Ninfa's existence" because the chain "itself may well represent a nadir unto itself in the world of Houston Tex-Mex."

Commenting on the opening of the Galveston location in 2010, Laura Elder of The Galveston County Daily News said that while she "visited only once when the restaurant still was working out the kinks" she felt "I thought the food was ok" and "I’ve had better, especially on the island, where the Tex-Mex trade is pretty competitive and some local families are very good at what they do. She added that "What sort of put me off about Maggie Rita’s was that they served the food on disposable plates" since those are often used at barbecues and picnics but not at fine restaurants. Elder reasoned that "I did think the prices were extremely reasonable" and that "perhaps their plate delivery hadn't yet arrived and I was making a rash assessment." Elder did not have the margaritas, and she said they "probably would have lightened up my view of the eatery."

== See also ==
- List of Tex-Mex restaurants
- Tex-Mex cuisine in Houston
