= La Bamba Mexican Restaurant =

American fast casual Tex-Mex restaurant chain

La Bamba West, Inc.
- Trade name: La Bamba Mexican Restaurant; La Bamba Burritos
- Company type: Private
- Industry: Restaurant
- Founded: 1987; 38 years ago in Champaign, Illinois, US
- Founders: Ramiro Aguas; Antonio Aguas
- Headquarters: Champaign, Illinois, US
- Number of locations: 8 (2019)
- Area served: Illinois; Indiana; Kentucky; Wisconsin
- Products: Tex Mex cuisine
- Owners: Aguas family
- Website: labambaburritos.com

La Bamba West, Inc., doing business as La Bamba Mexican Restaurant and La Bamba Burritos, is a fast casual restaurant chain that was started in 1987 and is based in Champaign, Illinois. Their locations remain open late at night, serving Tex-Mex cuisine under the slogan "burritos as big as your head". The restaurants are located predominantly in college communities within the American Midwest.

== Description ==
La Bamba Mexican Restaurant is a Mexican fast casual restaurant chain that was started in the Illinois city of Champaign in 1987. They are known for their slogan "burritos as big as your head", its hot sauce, and for being open late. While all serve Tex-Mex cuisine, some have expanded menus. Their restaurants often have artwork depicting athletes with burritos for heads.

== History ==
In 1987, brothers Ramiro and Antonio Aguas opened the first La Bamba restaurant near the main campus of the University of Illinois at Urbana–Champaign. Named for the song of the same name, it expanded into a franchise family-owned by La Bamba Mexican Restaurants Group, which had at least 27 locations in the central states with plans of possible expansion into Georgia, Tennessee, and Minnesota in 1997. As of March 2019, there were 8 locations in Illinois, Indiana, Kentucky, and Wisconsin.

=== Legal dealings ===
Antonio was abducted at gunpoint outside his Champaign business and held for ransom for several days after being transported across the state border in 2006. The Federal Bureau of Investigation and Portland, Indiana law enforcement efforts led to the safe return of Antonio and the arrest of two suspects.

La Bamba Mexican Restaurants Group was named in 2007 lawsuits by the Ohio Attorney General against Citibank and Campus Dimensions Inc. Advertisements offered free burritos to students without mentioning that applying for a credit card was required to receive the offer.

== See also ==
- List of Tex-Mex restaurants
