= BurritoVille =

Coordinates: 40.744916°N 73.998199°W

- Interactive map of BurritoVille

Restaurant information
- Owner: Karama Property Development
- Food type: Tex-Mex
- Dress code: Casual
- Location: 424 Grand Street, Jersey City, Hudson, New Jersey, United States

BurritoVille was a New York-based quick-service food chain serving Tex-Mex cuisine, established in 1992. Until 2008, there were 16 locations in Manhattan, one in Westbury, New York on Long Island, and one in Hoboken, NJ. The menu items consist mostly of various types of burritos and tacos, as well as salads and nachos. Many of the items are vegetarian.

The chain's slogan is, "We're Mexcellent!" Interior decor consists of antique maps of Mexico and classic sensational horror and romance Mexican cinema posters.

In September 2008, Burritoville closed all its Manhattan locations as a result of filing for reorganization under the bankruptcy laws. However, the Westbury location remained open for business until later closing. In November 2008, one of the former owners of Blimpie purchased BurritoVille and directed a complete makeover of the chain. The Financial District location (36 Water Street), which re-opened in July 2009, was the first of several planned locations in New York City and throughout the country but that location closed in 2010.

In 2011, Burritoville's website listed only its 23rd Street restaurant in Manhattan as an active location but that location closed again after several years. As of late 2014, the website listed only a single restaurant located in Jersey City, New Jersey which has been listed as closed on Yelp since 2023 with the page also listed as closed on Google and with their online ordering website being down.

== See also ==
- List of Tex-Mex restaurants
