= Don Pablo's =

American Tex-Mex restaurant chain

- Type: Subsidiary
- Industry: Restaurants
- Founded: 1985; 41 years ago in Lubbock, Texas
- Defunct: June 23, 2019; 7 years ago
- Fate: Closure by parent
- Headquarters: San Antonio, Texas
- Number of locations: 120 (at its peak in 1998)
- Area served: Midwest, East Coast, Southern United States
- Key people: Jason Kemp (owner/manager), Allen Jones (owner/manager), Larry Harris (owner/manager)
- Products: Burritos, Tacos, Quesadillas, Fajitas, Enchiladas
- Owner: Food Management Partners
- Website: Last archive of official website (June 2019)

Don Pablo's was an American chain of Tex-Mex restaurants founded in Lubbock, Texas, founded in 1985. The menu featured Tex-Mex items, made-from-scratch salsa, tortillas and sauces, and a range of other Mexican specialties. At one time, this chain had as many as 120 locations throughout the United States and was the second largest full-service Mexican restaurant chain within the United States during the late 1990s, second only to Chi-Chi's. The chain had 34 restaurants in 14 states when it was acquired in 2014 by Food Management Partners. By October 2016, the chain was reduced to 12 restaurants in 9 states, 6 restaurants in 4 states by July 2018, 5 restaurants in 3 states by September 2018, and later 3 restaurants in 3 states by November 2018. The remaining restaurants in the struggling chain gradually and quietly closed over the next seven months until the last restaurant in Deptford Township, New Jersey, finally closed on June 23, 2019.

== History ==
This chain of Tex-Mex restaurants was started by Texas-based DF&R Restaurants Inc. in 1985. After a period of rapid growth throughout the state of Texas, Don Pablo's began to build new locations in the Midwest.

By 1995, DF&R had 51 Don Pablo's locations which led Madison, Georgia-based Apple South to notice the chain's successful growth and to purchase DF&R later that year. At the time of the purchase, Apple South was one of the largest franchise holders in the Applebee's restaurant system with 170 Applebee's restaurants, and operated restaurants from other franchise chains, most of which were located in the South and Midwest. Two years later, Apple South decided to divest all of its 264 Applebee's franchises (in a franchise system that had 960 units), along with its other franchise properties, to focus its efforts on the 120-unit Don Pablo's and the other company-owned chains. Shortly after the Applebee's restaurant divestiture, Apple South changed its name to Avado Brands to emphasize the change of business.

Things did not go as well as Avado had originally planned, and it filed for bankruptcy in 2004. At that time, it had 106 Don Pablo's. Avado exited bankruptcy a year later with 96 Don Pablo's in operation. After spending two years trying to revitalize the brand, Avado filed for bankruptcy for the second time in September 2007; subsequently, they closed or sold about half of their 90 locations.

In February 2008, 41 Don Pablo's locations were acquired by Rita Restaurant Corporation of Madison, Georgia, a fully owned subsidiary of DDJ Capital Management of Waltham, Massachusetts. Rita tried to revitalize the brand by closing under-performing locations and selling franchises. A franchise was sold to a Florida-based operator who re-opened a Don Pablo's in Sarasota, Florida, in 2012. The Sarasota location was the sole remaining franchise until it was finally closed in 2015.

In 2014, the 34-unit chain was acquired by San Antonio-based Food Management Partners (FMP). FMP is also a franchise operator of Buffalo Wild Wings and several Italian restaurant chains. While FMP owned the company, locations were closed in February 2014 at Atlanta, Georgia; in August 2014 at Hobart, Indiana; in February 2015 at Canton, Ohio; in April 2015 at Flint, Michigan; in February 2016 at Greenville, South Carolina and Maple Grove, Minnesota; in August 2016 at Richfield, Minnesota and Newport, Kentucky; and in September 2016 at Beavercreek, Ohio and Owings Mills, Maryland.

On October 4, 2016, Rita Restaurant Corporation filed for Chapter 11 bankruptcy after nearly cutting the number of Don Pablo's locations in half. At the time of the bankruptcy announcement, all four Indianapolis-area locations along with locations in Battle Creek, Michigan and Toledo, Ohio were immediately closed with little advance warning. At the time of the bankruptcy filing, there were 12 restaurants remaining. By November 2016, the Alexandria, Virginia location quietly disappeared from the Don Pablo's website. The Eden Prairie, Minnesota location quietly disappeared from the Don Pablo's website sometime between February and July 2017. The contents of the Eden Prairie restaurant were auctioned off in March. The Shelby Charter Township, Michigan location disappeared from the Don Pablo's website sometime between July 8 and July 19. In February 2018, the Don Pablo's location in Lafayette, Indiana quietly closed to leave eight locations.

In April 2018, the Grand Prairie, Texas location quietly closed its doors to leave the number of locations at seven by May 2018.

In July 2018, the Norwood, Ohio location closed its doors to leave a total number of six locations in Delaware, New Jersey, Maryland, and Texas. In September 2018, the Christiana, Delaware restaurant was closed, leaving just five restaurants in three states.

In early November 2018, the Moorestown, New Jersey, restaurant closed for the final time and about the same time, the listing for the Fort Worth, Texas, restaurant disappeared from the Don Pablo's website to leave three locations. Just two and a half weeks later, the location at White Marsh Mall in Baltimore County, the last location in Maryland, was closed just days before Thanksgiving while the last Don Pablo's restaurant in Texas also disappeared from the website, leaving Deptford Township, New Jersey as the last one in business. The Deptford location finally closed in June 2019.

== See also ==
- List of casual dining restaurant chains
- List of defunct restaurants of the United States
- List of Mexican restaurants
- List of Tex-Mex restaurants
