= Lupe Tortilla =

Tex-Mex restaurant chain

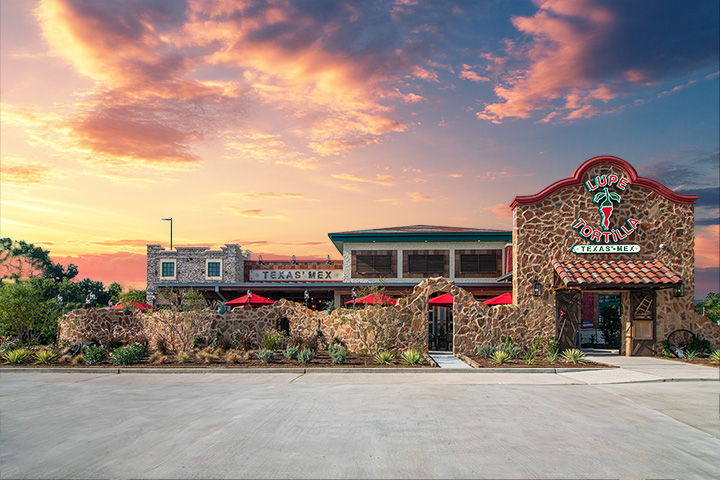
- Exterior of a restaurant in Montgomery, Texas

Restaurant information
- Location: Texas, United States

Lupe Tortilla is a Tex-Mex restaurant chain.

== Description ==
Lupe Tortilla has served Texas-Mex cuisine since 1983, with beginnings in Addicks, Texas.

== History ==
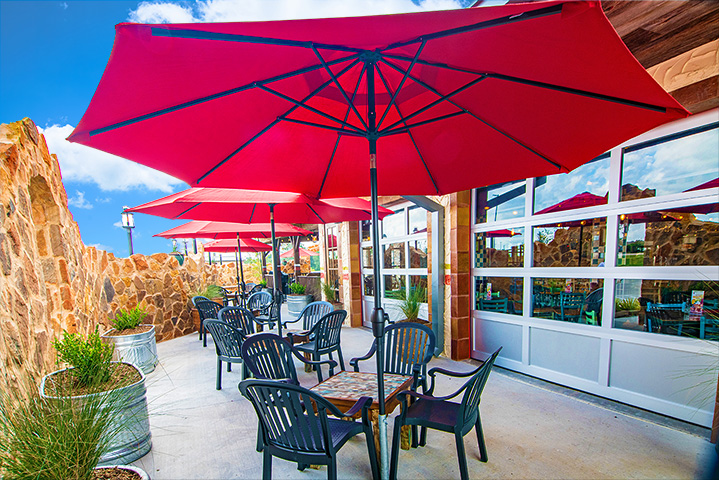
Lupe Tortilla Patio

The business was established by Stan and Audrey Holt in 1983.

=== Locations ===
There were eleven locations in Greater Houston, as of 2012. There were three restaurants in San Antonio in 2022. Lupe Tortilla also began operating in Irving in 2019 and New Braunfels in 2022.

== Reception ==
One writer for Paper City magazine wrote, "Lupe Tortilla is no five-star, Michelin-rated destination for gourmands. It's more like a Chili's-meets-Mi Cocina. It's a chain. It's not fancy."

== See also ==
- List of Tex-Mex restaurants
- Tex-Mex cuisine in Houston
