= The Goose (restaurant) =

Restaurant in Portland, Oregon, U.S.

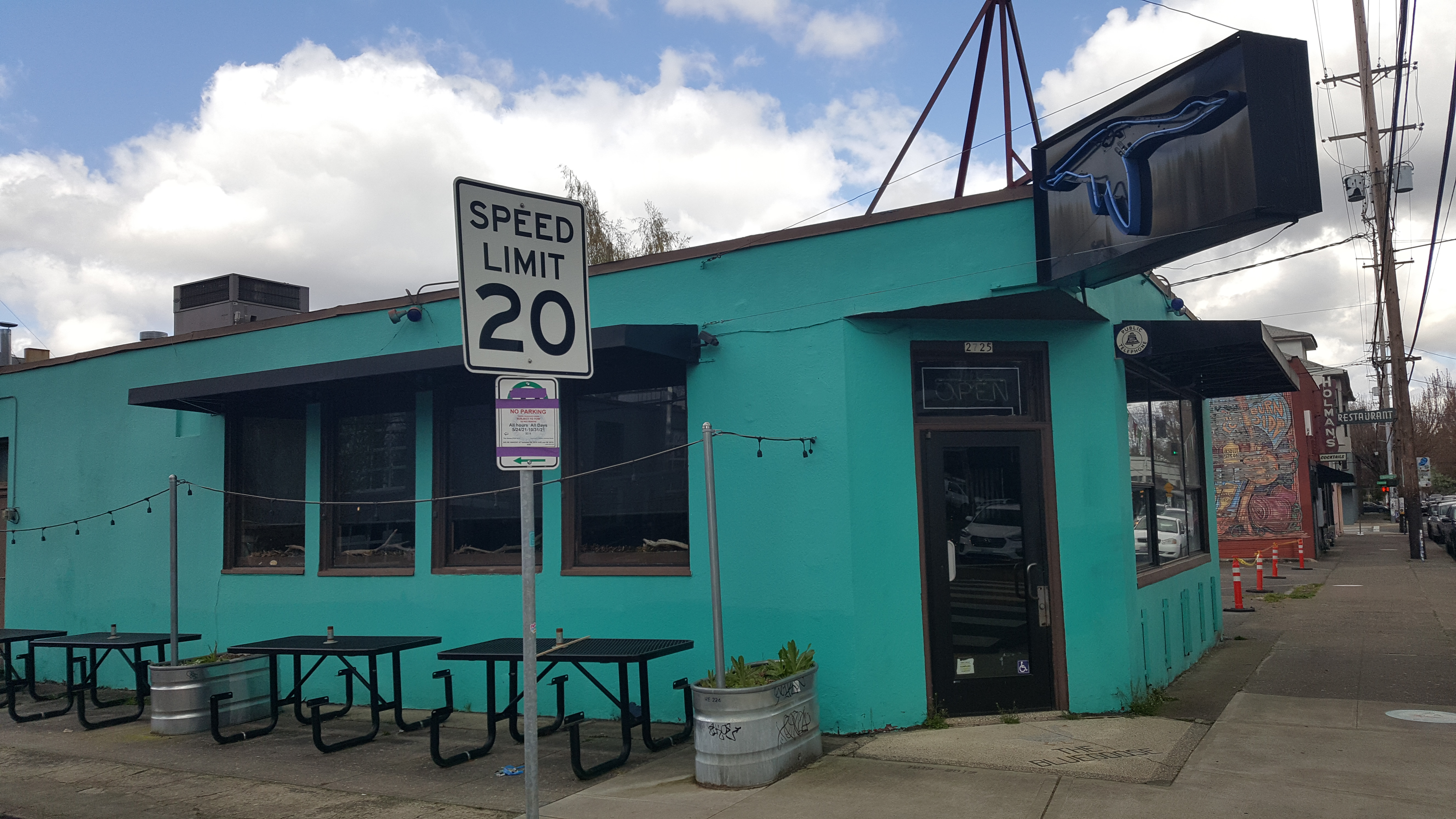
- The restaurant's exterior in 2022
- Interactive map of The Goose

Restaurant information
- Established: June 7, 2014
- Owner: Kristine Craine
- Chef: Matthew Stauss
- Food type: New Mexican; Southwestern; Tex-Mex
- Location: 2725 SE Ankeny Street, Portland, Multnomah, Oregon, 97214, United States
- Coordinates: 45.5223°N 122.6376°W
- Seating capacity: 52
- Website: thegoosepdx.com

The Goose, formerly The Blue Goose, was a New Mexican, Southwestern, and Tex-Mex restaurant in southeast Portland, Oregon, United States.

== Description ==
The Goose was a 52-seat New Mexican, Southwestern, and Tex-Mex restaurant at the intersection of Southeast 28th Avenue and Ankeny Street in southeast Portland's Buckman neighborhood. The menu had adobada, carne asada, chile con queso with chorizo, a cheeseburger with green chiles, chile rellenos, enchiladas, and tacos, as well as in-house smoked meats and handmade tortillas. The drink menu included margaritas, Mexican beers, a wide selection of tequilas, wine, and other cocktails with agave. The restaurant's interior had turquoise-colored decor.

== History ==
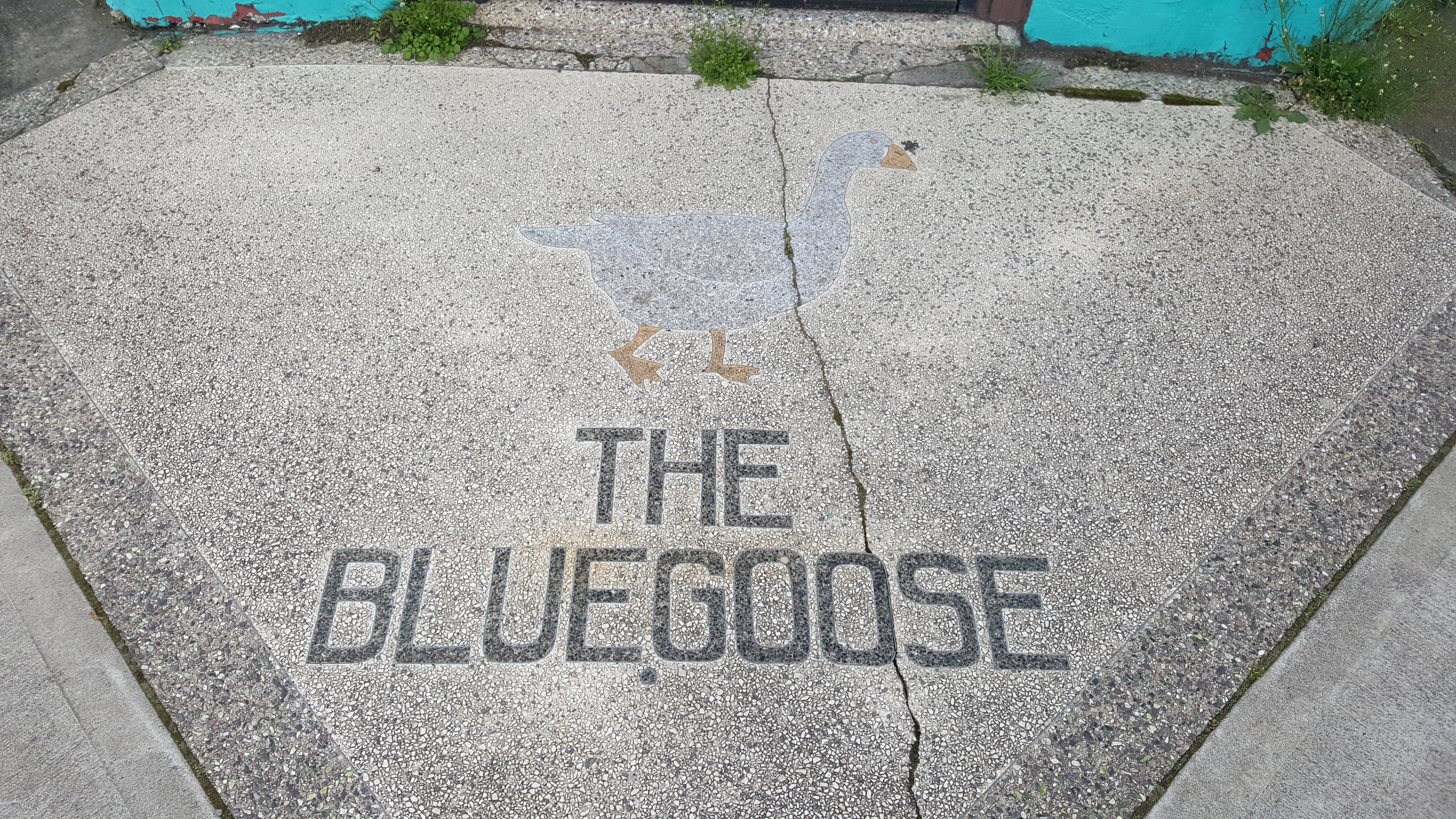
The restaurant's front entrance (picture in 2022) references the building's history

The building that housed The Goose previously served as a tavern called The Blue Goose. In addition to drinks, the business served hard-boiled eggs and sold eggs by the dozen. The building housed the Tex-Mex restaurant Esparza's from 1990 to 2014. Kristine Craine opened the later iteration of The Blue Goose on June 7, 2014. Some of Esparza's interior features, including the bar, were repurposed for The Blue Goose. Matthew Stauss served as the restaurant's first chef. The restaurant's name was later changed to simply The Goose.

After closing, The Goose was replaced by Moonshot Tavern in 2024.

== Reception ==
In his review of the restaurant shortly after opening, Ben Waterhouse of The Oregonian wrote, "The vibe is more new-West saloon than colorful cantina, with Esparza's bright panels and constellation of bric-a-brac replaced with stained plywood and earth tones. Cattle skulls with lightbulbs in their eye sockets add a zany touch. Service is pleasant and attentive." He later included The Blue Goose's cheeseburger in his "definitive guide to Portland's best green chile cheeseburgers", calling it the "best-tasting version we found".

The Oregonian's Michael Russell included The Goose in his 2015 list of the best restaurants in southeast Portland. The newspaper's Colin Powers called The Goose's food "enchanting" and included the restaurant in his 2015 overview of Portland's best margaritas. He said the restaurant offers the "best menu of flavored margaritas".

In 2016, Willamette Week said, "The Goose's mountains of New Mexican excess are so unabashedly American they make Guy Fieri look like Vlad Putin." In 2019, Alex Frane included The Goose in Eater Portland's list of "Portland's most enticing margaritas".

== See also ==
- Hispanics and Latinos in Portland, Oregon
- List of Tex-Mex restaurants
