= Nacho Borracho =

Bar and restaurant in Seattle, Washington, U.S.

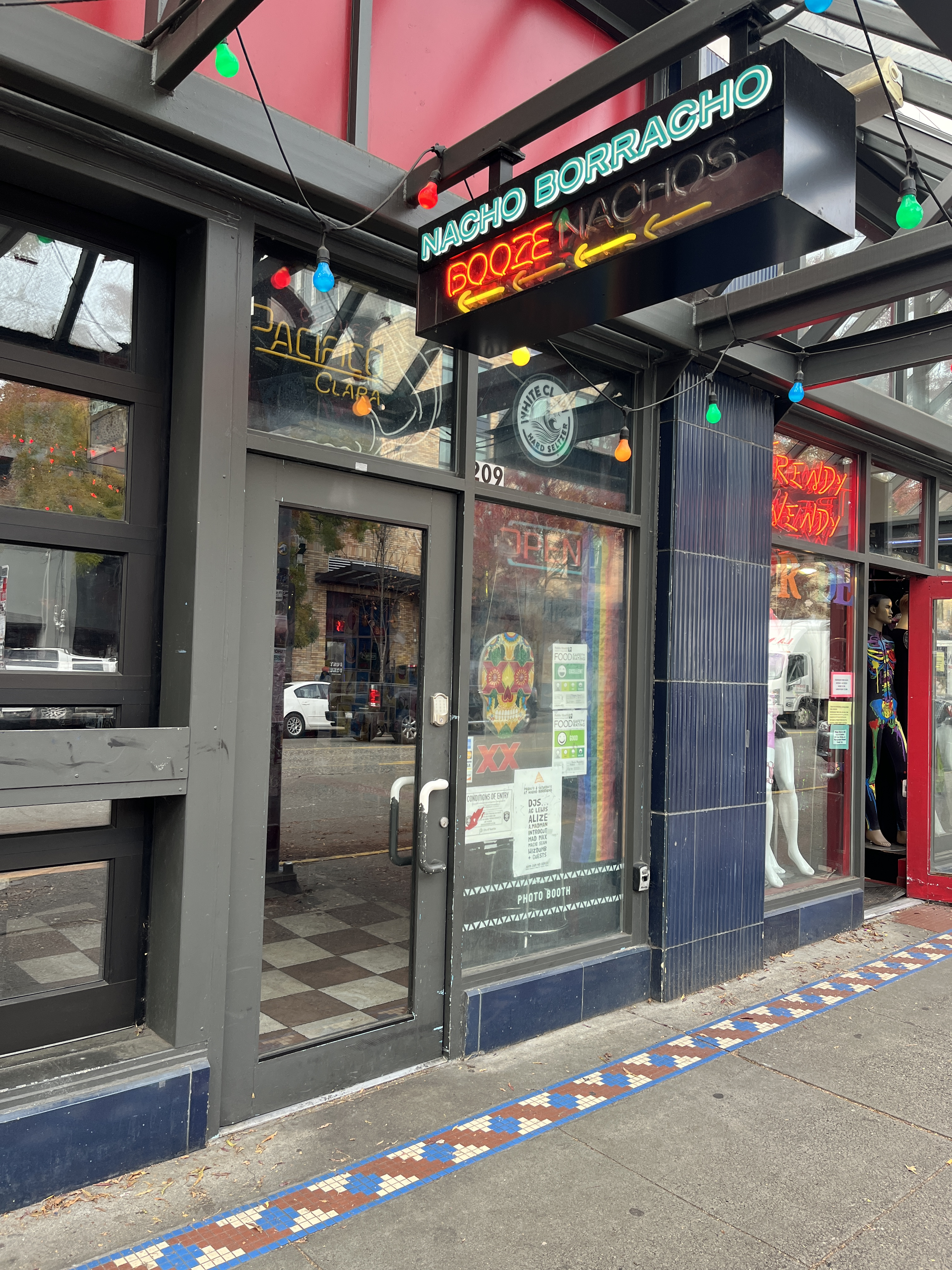
- The restaurant's exterior, 2022
- Interactive map of Nacho Borracho

Restaurant information
- Established: February 2014
- Food type: Mexican; Tex-Mex
- Location: 209 Broadway E, Seattle, King, Washington, 98102, United States
- Coordinates: 47.6202°N 122.3212°W

Nacho Borracho is a bar and Mexican/Tex-Mex restaurant in Seattle, in the U.S. state of Washington.

== Description ==
The bar and Mexican restaurant Nacho Borracho (English: "drunk nacho") is located on Broadway on Seattle's Capitol Hill. The Daily Meal has described the establishment as a "late-night Tex-Mex dive". The drink menu has included frozen cocktails such as avocado margaritas and pink guava Moscow mules.

The restaurant has housed other businesses. Neon Taco, operated by chef Monica Dimas until 2019, was described as Nacho Borracho's "resident taco shop". In 2016, Eater Seattle said:

Nacho Borracho and Neon Taco somehow straddle the line where Los Angeles, Austin, and Seattle meet. Nacho Borracho, the bar side, pours rotating cocktails on tap, frozen margaritas from slushie machines, and tall boys of Oly. Neon Taco, the taco joint in the back, makes a great selection of fresh salsas, queso from scratch, and no-fuss street tacos in flavors seamlessly fused, like the ever-popular Asian-American-inspired General Tso taco.

In 2021, the website said Nacho Borracho was "home to the stellar taco window El Xolo, as well as bagels from Loxsmith during breakfast and brunch hours Thursday through Sundays". El Solo serves "slow-roasted pork in tortillas nixtamalized from scratch and airy light queso-topped chips", according to Gabe Guarente of Eater Seattle.

== History ==
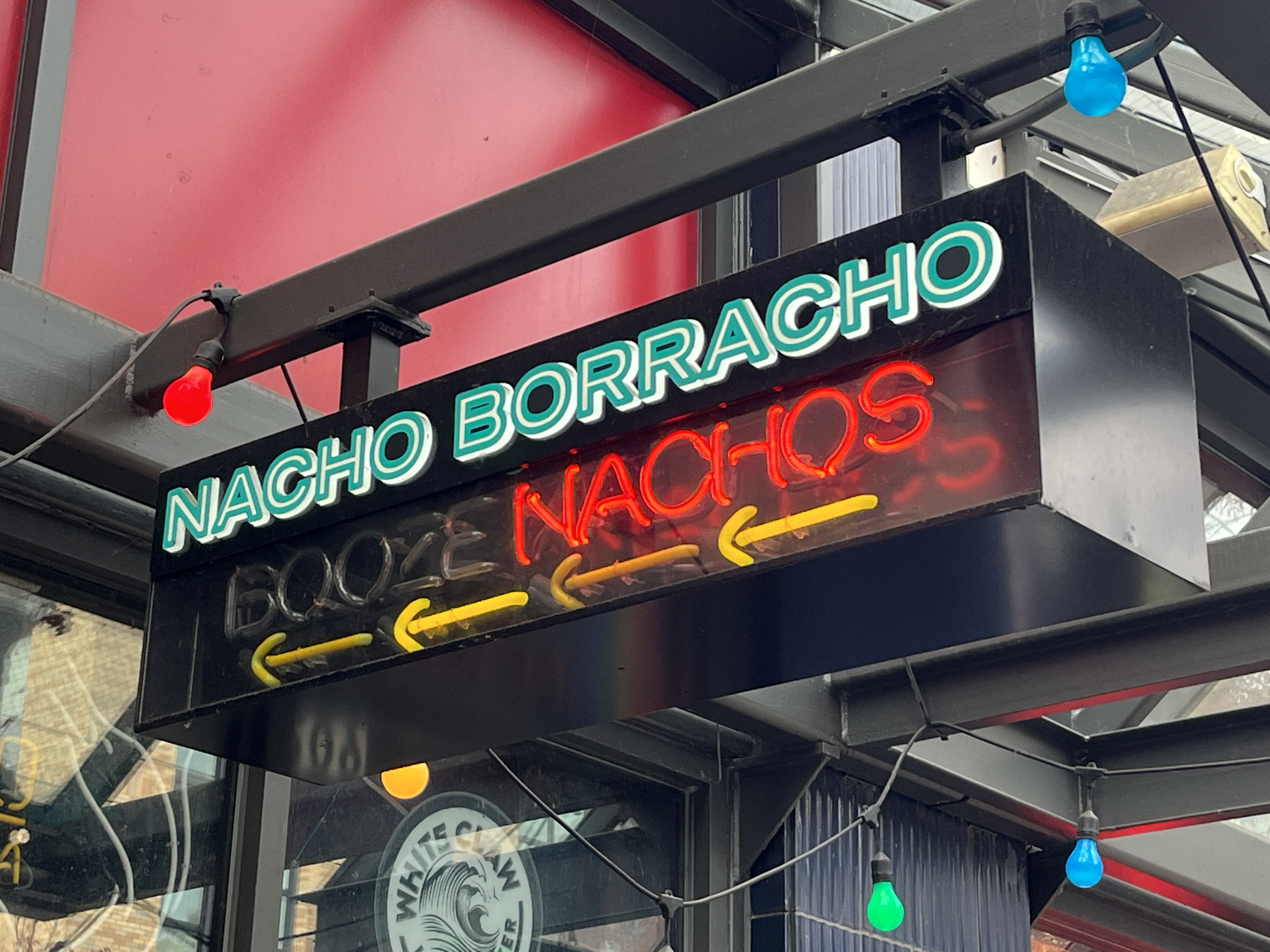
Sign, 2022

The restaurant opened in February 2014. In 2015, Dimas announced plans to open a Mexican street food concept, operating from Nacho Borracho's take-out window. Neon Taco closed in March 2019. Chef Ricardo Valdes opened El Xolo as a replacement almost immediately.

In 2018, security called police seeking to remove political activist Joey Gibson, who refused to leave. According to Megan Hill of Eater Seattle, "Patriot Prayer supporters then flooded Neon Taco's Yelp page with negative reviews", many of which were subsequently removed.

Rachel Marshall was a co-owner, until her death in 2023.

== Reception ==
Julia Wayne included Nacho Borracho in Seattle Magazine's 2014 overview of the city's best Mexican restaurants. Writers included the restaurant in Eater Seattle's 2016 overview of "where to get your Tex-Mex fix in Seattle", 2019 list of 8 "super cool Seattle spots to drink margaritas", and 2021 list of "where to find terrific boozy frozen drinks in Seattle".

== See also ==
- List of dive bars
- List of Mexican restaurants
- List of Tex-Mex restaurants
