= Tortilla Coast =

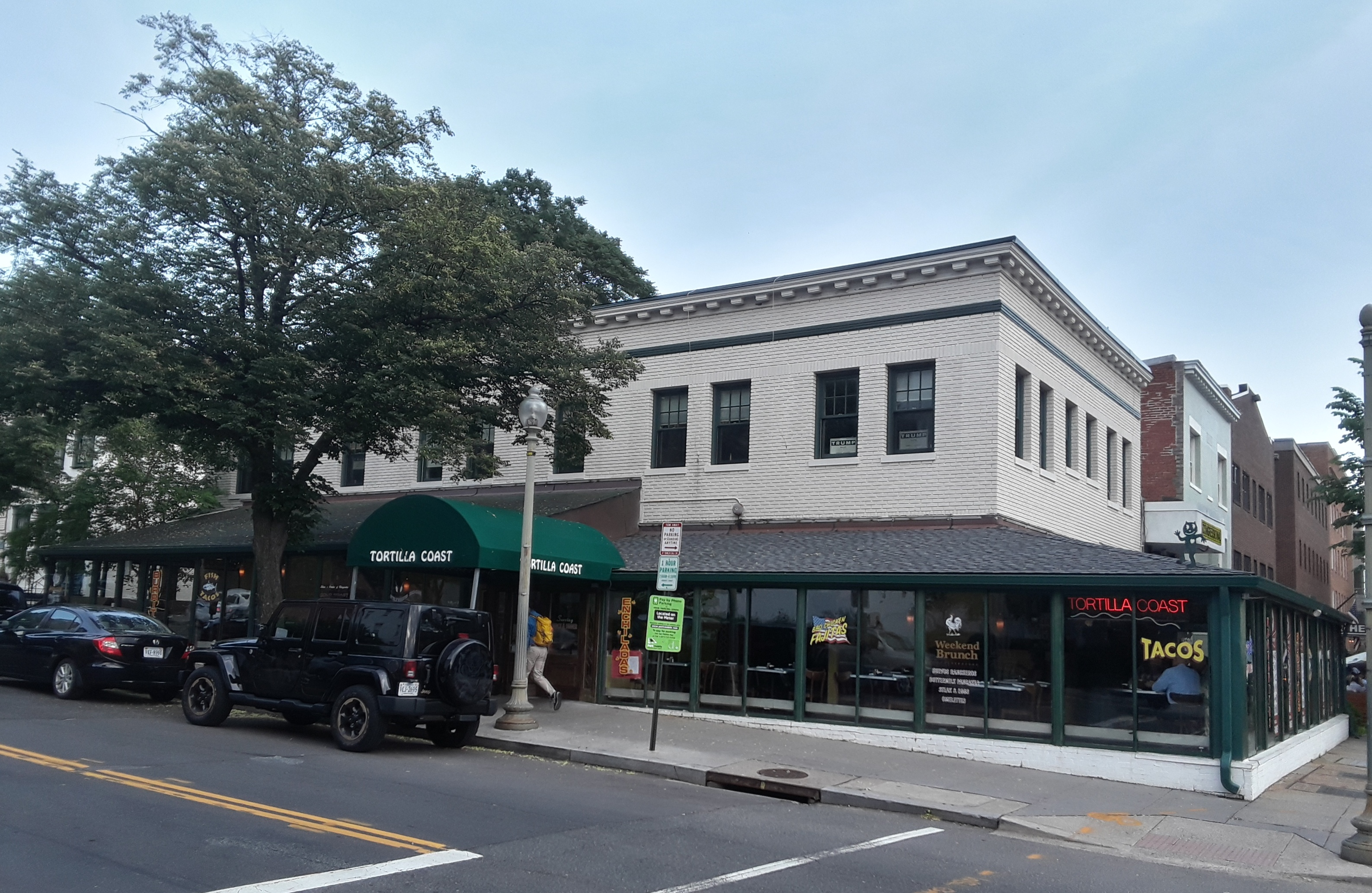
- May 2019
- Interactive map of Tortilla Coast

Restaurant information
- Established: Summer 1988
- Closed: December 18, 2021
- Owner: Clover Restaurant Group
- Previous owners: Bo Marcus, John Breen
- Food type: Tex-Mex
- Location: 400 First Street SE, Washington, D.C., 20003
- Coordinates: 38.884981°N 77.005612°W
- Website: tortillacoast.com

Tortilla Coast was an American Tex-Mex restaurant located in Washington, D.C. Their Capitol Hill location was recognized as a popular watering hole for politicians and political staffers. Tortilla Coast was known for their frozen margarita pitchers and bottomless chips and salsa.

== History ==
Tortilla Coast was founded by Georgetown University graduates and Texas natives Bo Marcus and John Breen. The restaurant opened at D Street and Massachusetts NE during the summer of 1988. They later moved to 1st and D Streets SE, next to the Capitol South Metro station. The restaurant's murals were painted by one of James Baker's daughters-in-law.

The restaurant was purchased in 2011 by the Clover Restaurant Group, a venture founded by hotelier James Sullivan Sr. and sons. They purchased the restaurant along with three locations of Cafe Deluxe. In 2018, Clover Restaurant Group merged with three Washington area restaurants owned by Geoff Tracy. The combined venture, called Chef Geoff's Deluxe Hospitality, owned Tortilla Coast along with four Cafe Deluxe locations, two locations of Chef Geoff's, and Lia's.

In December 2011 they opened a second restaurant at 1460 P Street NW in Logan Circle. Its menu was geared more towards authentic Mexican cuisine and served 99 varieties of tequila. The Logan Circle location closed in June 2017.

On July 17, 2020, Geoff Tracy announced that Tortilla Coast would close at the end of August 2020 due to limited patronage during the COVID-19 pandemic. Despite the news of closure prompting a brief wave of patronage in 2020 and 2021, high rent and lack of business led to Tortilla Coast permanently closing on December 18, 2021.

== Rio Room ==
Tortilla Coast's Capitol Hill location was known as a frequent meeting place for members of the United States Congress. Many meetings took place in a private, windowless basement room called the "Rio Room". Texas Senator Ted Cruz hosted Tea Party meetings there in the lead up to the 2013 government shutdown. Media subsequently referred to Republicans meeting there as the "Tortilla Coast Caucus".

Members of the Freedom Caucus have had meetings in Tortilla Coast's basement. The irony of anti-immigration lawmakers meeting at a Tex-Mex restaurant was not lost on journalists, with The Washington Post also noting "the hilarity of high-level talks going down in a place with a name just stinking of suburban strip-mall kitsch." Wisconsin Representative Paul Ryan was a server at the Capitol Hill location in the early 1990s.

The Sunlight Foundation found that Tortilla Coast was among the seven most used venues for political fundraisers.

== See also ==
- List of Tex-Mex restaurants
