= Jackalope (restaurant) =

Restaurant in Seattle, Washington, U.S.

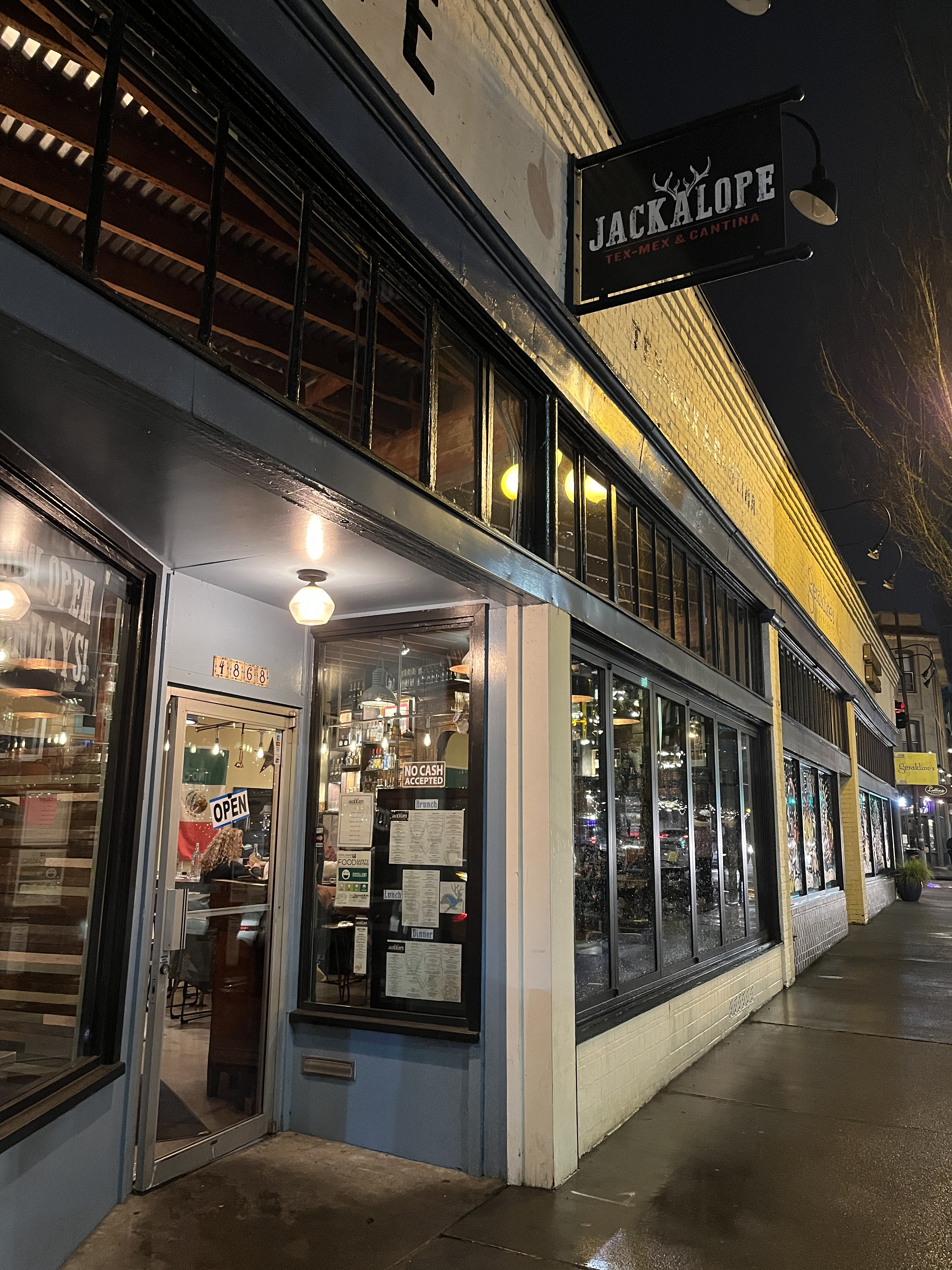
- The restaurant's exterior, 2023
- Interactive map of Jackalope

Restaurant information
- Established: December 2021
- Owners: Jack Timmons; Graham Ayers
- Food type: Tex-Mex; Mexican
- Location: 4868 Rainier Ave South, Seattle, King, Washington, 98118, United States
- Coordinates: 47.5581°N 122.2849°W
- Website: jackalopetexmex.com

Jackalope Tex-Mex and Cantina, or simply Jackalope, is a restaurant in Columbia City, Seattle, in the U.S. state of Washington. Established by co-owners Jack Timmons and Graham Ayers in 2021, the restaurant serves Tex-Mex and Mexican cuisine, and has garnered a positive reception.

== Description ==
Named after the mythical creature of the same name, Jackalope is a restaurant on Rainier Avenue South in Seattle's Columbia City neighborhood. Established by staff of a local barbecue restaurant chain, Jackalope serves Tex-Mex and Mexican cuisine with smoked meat in dishes like enchiladas, fajitas, and tacos. Brisket appears in the chili gravy, enchiladas, and picadillo. The restaurant has also served chile con queso, chile rellenos, grilled quail, nachos, rockfish, stuffed peppers, tostadas with ceviche, baja fish tacos with chipotle cream and mango pico de gallo, and rice and beans.

The campechana has Dungeness crab and wild shrimp from Texas. The 'El Caesar' salad has green chile dressing. Cumin is used in many dishes. Jackalope's signature hot sauce has Fresno and habanero chilies. The weekend brunch menu has included Huevos rancheros and Texas-style breakfast tacos. The drink menu has included margaritas, mezcal and tequila.

== History ==
Jack Timmons and Graham Ayers, the founder and a longtime general manager of Jack's BBQ, respectively, opened Jackalope in December 2021, in the space that previously housed El Sombrero for approximately 17 years. The opening was slightly later than the previously reported launch dates of September and November 2021 by Eater Seattle and Thrillist, respectively.

== Reception ==
Allecia Vermillion included Jackalope in the take-out edition of Seattle Metropolitan's 2022 list of the city's best new restaurants. In 2023, Aimee Rizzo and Kayla Sager-Riley included the business in The Infatuation's overview of recommended eateries for birthday dinners, and Harry Cheadle and Charlie Lahud-Zahner included Jackalope in Eater Seattle's list of fourteen "mouth-watering" Mexican restaurants in the metropolitan area. Tan Vinh of The Seattle Times said Jackalope's hot sauce "is one of the better takes around town".

== See also ==
- List of Mexican restaurants
- List of Tex-Mex restaurants
