= Pancho Villa (restaurant) =

Finnish restaurant chain

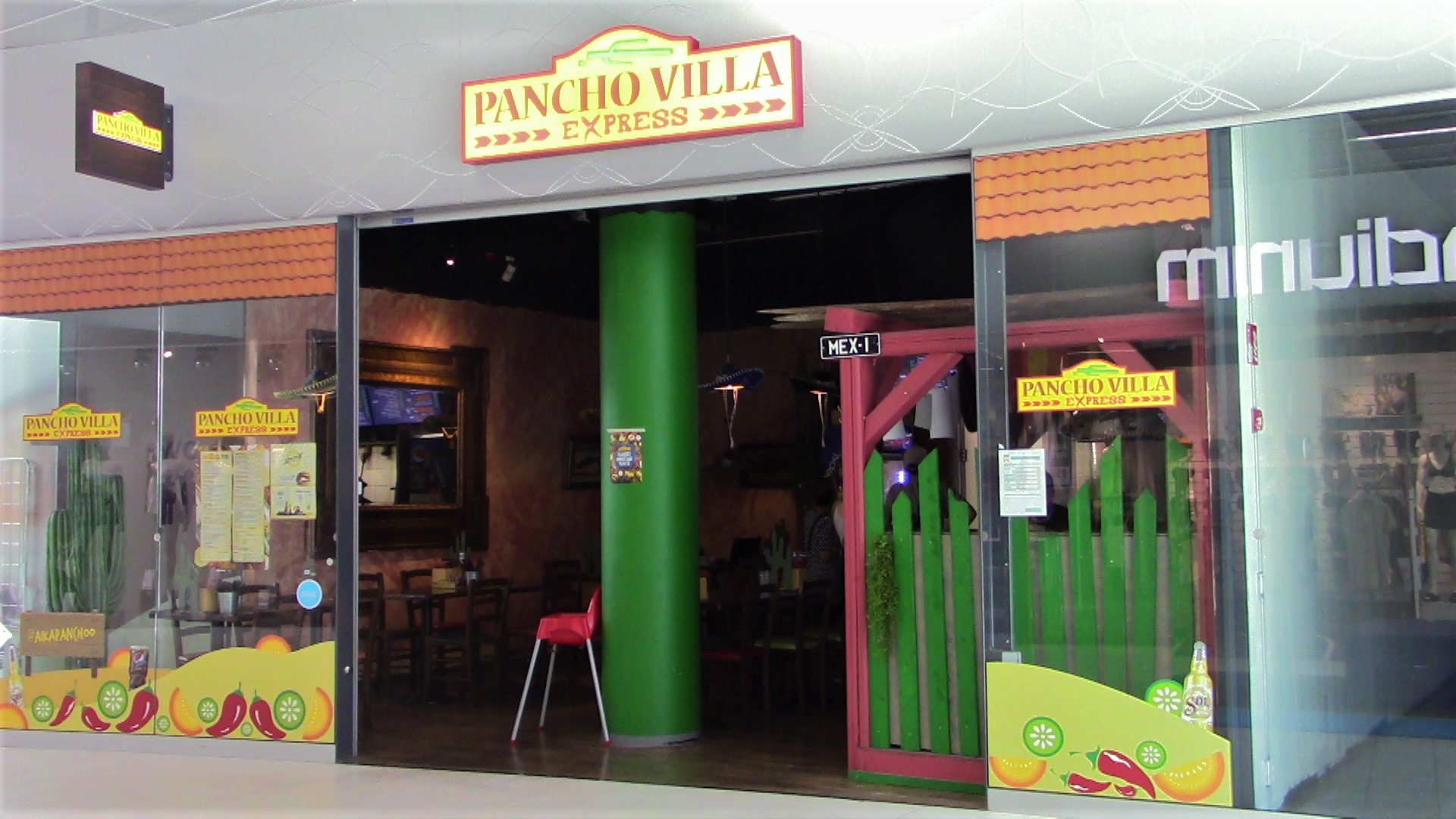
Pancho Villa at Shopping centre

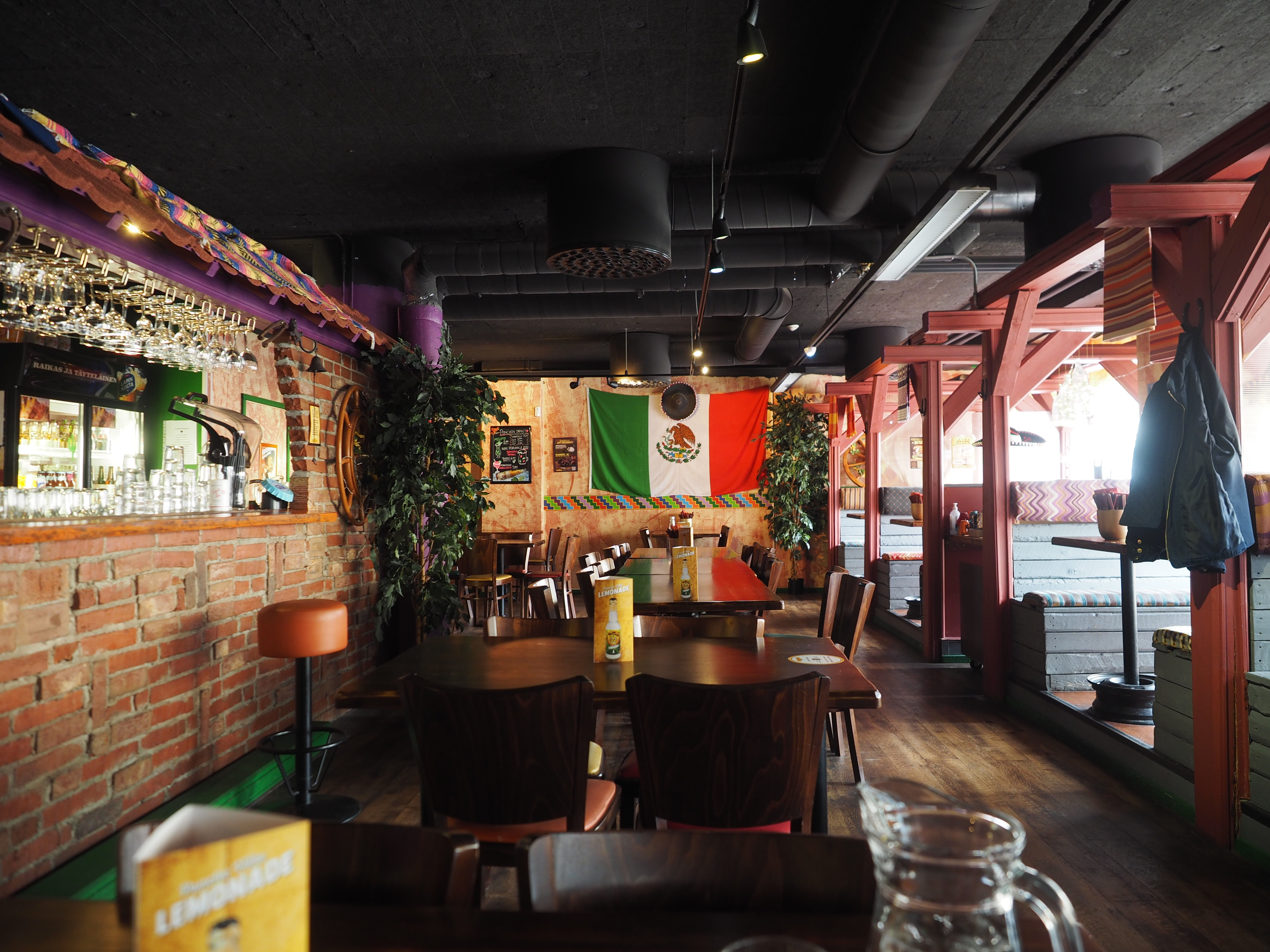
Interior of restaurant Pancho Villa in central Tampere, Finland

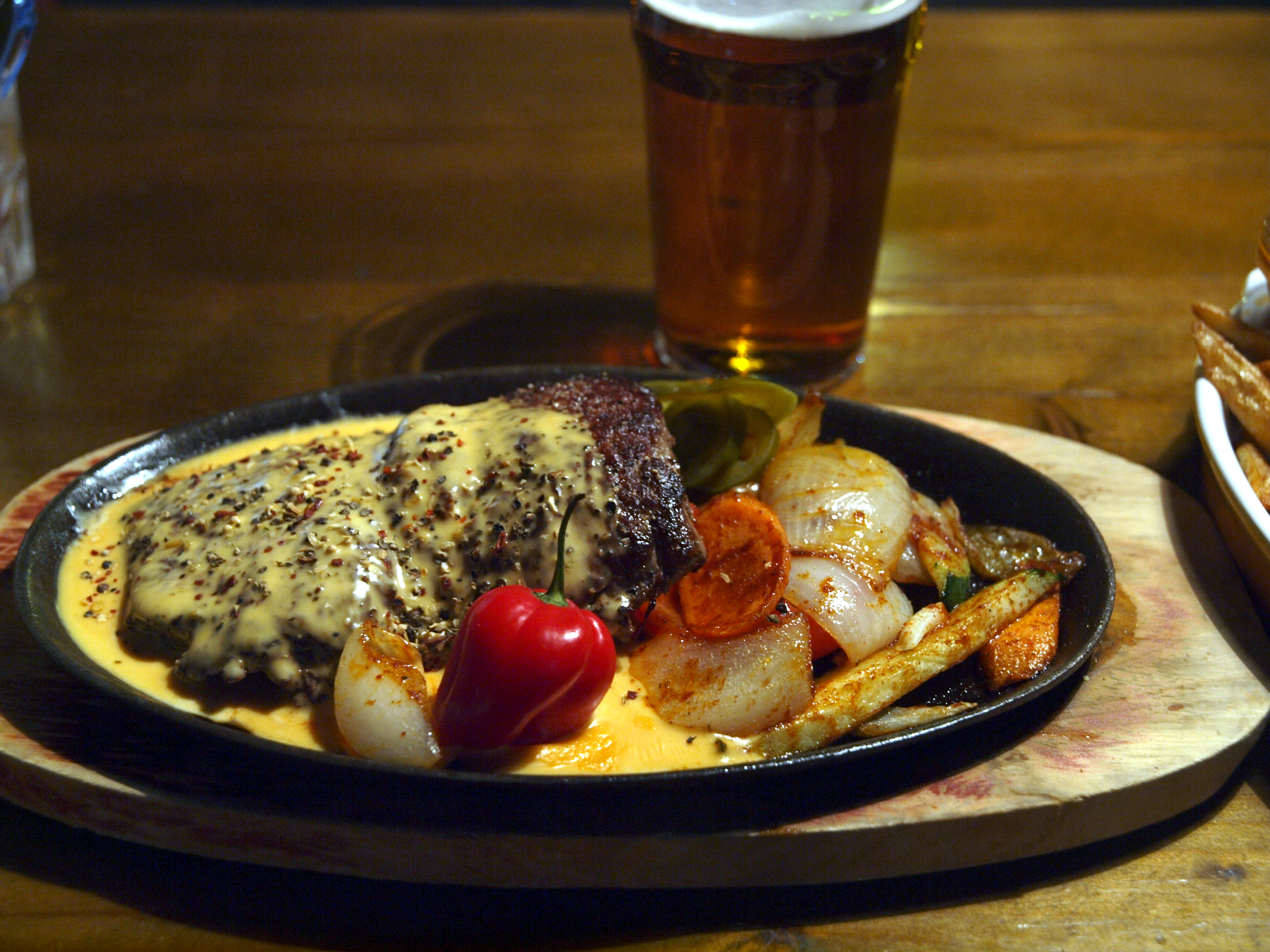
Mexican-style steak au poivre at restaurant Pancho Villa in Tampere.

Pancho Villa is a Finnish restaurant franchise serving Tex Mex cuisine. The first restaurant was opened in 2001 in Tammela, Tampere.

The franchise has restaurants in 15 municipalities all over Finland. The restaurant in Jyväskylä closed down in February 2014 when its owner Maizen Oy filed for bankruptcy, but almost four months later a new restaurant was opened by a new owner.

The franchise serves hamburgers, steaks and tortillas among other items. Like other franchises, Pancho Villa also hosts theme weeks, such as the Burger weeks. The franchise was named after the famous Mexican revolutionary leader Pancho Villa.

== Restaurant locations ==
- Tampere (6) (Hämeenkatu 7, Hämeenkatu 23, Satakunnankatu, Tammela, Lielahti, Ratina shopping centre)
- Lempäälä (1) (Ideapark)
- Lahti (1) (Syke shopping centre)
- Seinäjoki (2) (Kalevankatu 14, Ideapark)
- Kangasala (1) (Mäkirinteentie 4)
- Ylöjärvi (1) (Elo shopping centre)
- Hämeenlinna (2) (Sibeliuksenkatu 11, Goodman shopping centre)
- Jyväskylä (1) (Väinönkatu 9)
- Vaasa (1) (Vaasanpuistikko 22)
- Hyvinkää (1) (Torikatu 5)
- Turku (1) (Kauppiaskatu 12)
- Kuopio (2) (Matkus & puijonkatu 19)
- Oulu (2) (Kauppurienkatu 6-8, Ideapark)
- Pori (1) (Puuvilla shopping centre)
- Helsinki (1) (Itis shopping centre)
- Tornio (1) (Rajalla shopping centre)
- Rovaniemi (1) (Rovakatu 25-27)
- Raisio (1) (Raisiontori 7)
- Kouvola (1) (Veturi shopping centre)
- Nokia (1) (Pirkkalaistori)
- Raahe (1) (Kauppakatu 46)

== See also ==
- List of Tex-Mex restaurants
