= Tex-Mex =

Cuisine in the Southwestern United States and Northern Mexico

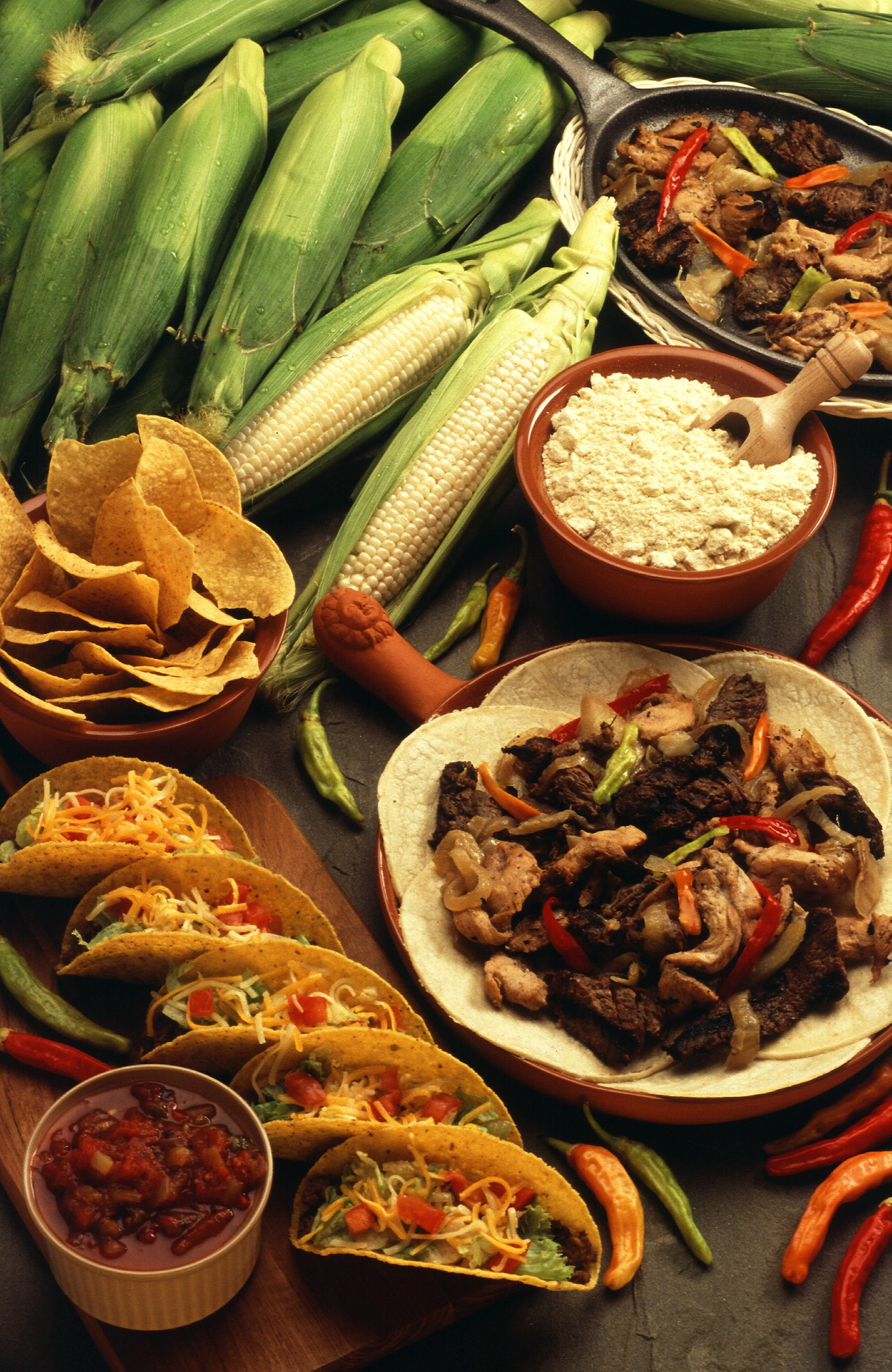
Examples of modern Tex-Mex dishes and ingredients including corn, tortilla chips, cheese, tacos, salsa, chilis, and beef dishes

Tex-Mex cuisine (derived from the words Texas and Mexico), or New Tejano cuisine, or simply Tejano cuisine is a regional American cuisine that originates from the culinary creations of Tejano people inspired in Mexican culinary traditions. It has spread from border states such as Texas and others in the Southwestern United States to the rest of the country. It is a subtype of Southwestern cuisine found in the American Southwest.

== Common dishes ==
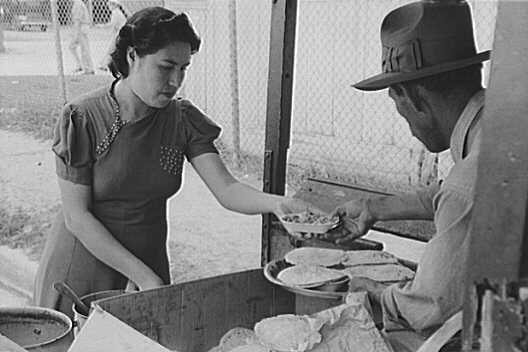
Preparing plates of tortillas and fried beans to sell to pecan shellers in San Antonio, Texas, photographed by Russell Lee in March 1939

Some ingredients in Tex-Mex cuisine are also common in Mexican cuisine, but others, not often used in Mexico, are often added, such as the use of cumin, introduced by Spanish immigrants to Texas from the Canary Islands.

Tex-Mex cuisine is characterized by its heavy use of shredded cheese, beans, meat (particularly chicken, beef, and pork), chili peppers, and spices, in addition to flour tortillas.

Sometimes various Tex-Mex dishes are made without the use of a tortilla. A common example of this is the "fajita bowl", which is a fajita served without a soft tortilla.

Generally, cheese plays a much bigger role in Tex-Mex food than in mainstream Mexican cuisine, particularly in the popularity of queso, which is often eaten with tortilla chips (alongside or in place of guacamole and salsa), or may be served over enchiladas, tamales, or burritos.

Nachos, although invented in the US-Mexico border town of Piedras Negras, Coahuila, became extremely popular in Texas before spreading across the US. They were named after its inventor, Nacho Anaya.

Tex-Mex circa the 1950s relied on combination platters using American-style cheeses, did not often have margaritas, and involved pecans in desserts.

== History ==
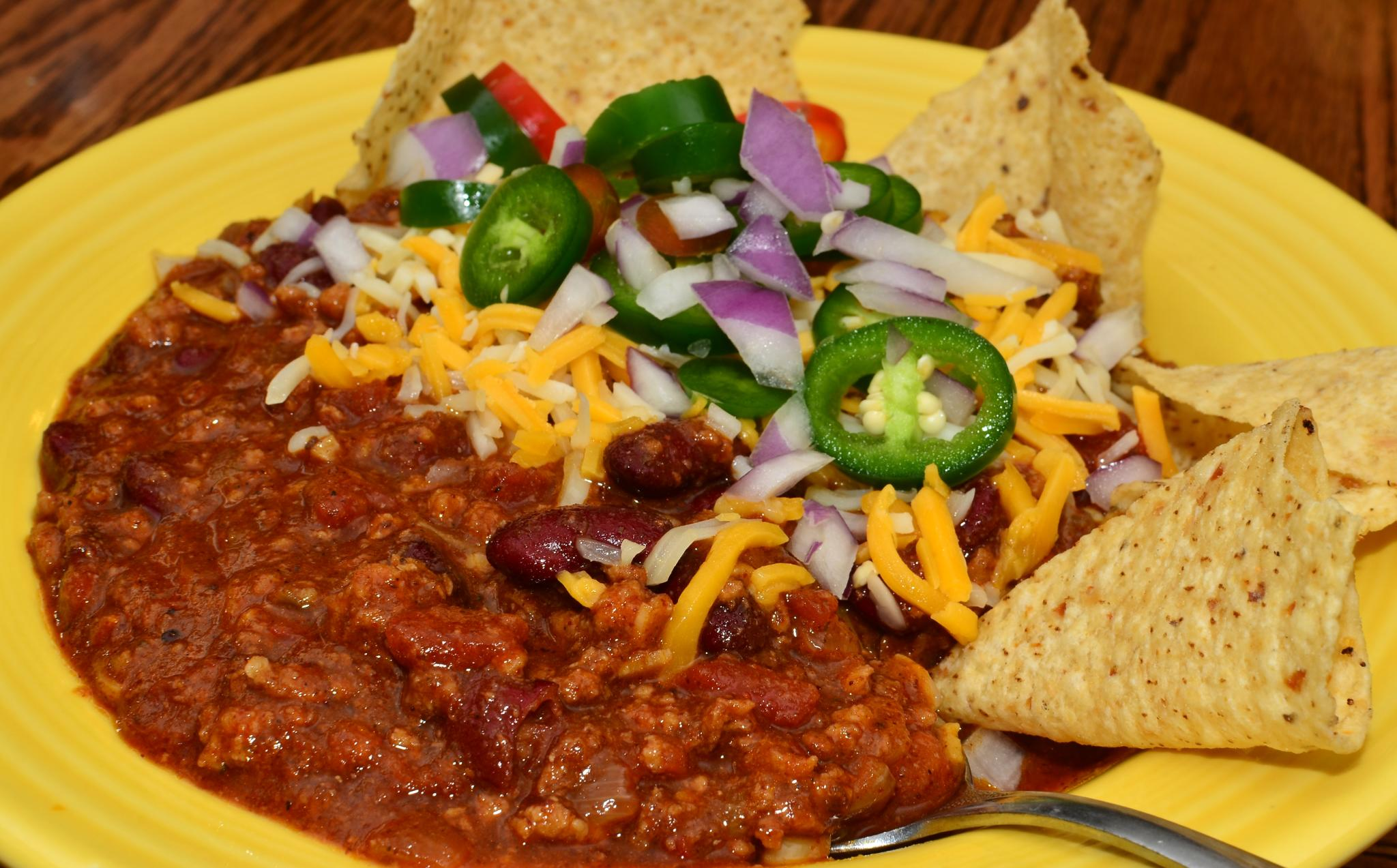
A bowl of chili served with traditional garnishes and tortilla chips

The cuisine that would come to be called Tex-Mex originated with Tejanos as a mix of native Mexican and Spanish foods when Texas was part of New Spain and later Mexico. This is occasionally referred to as "Old Tejano cuisine".

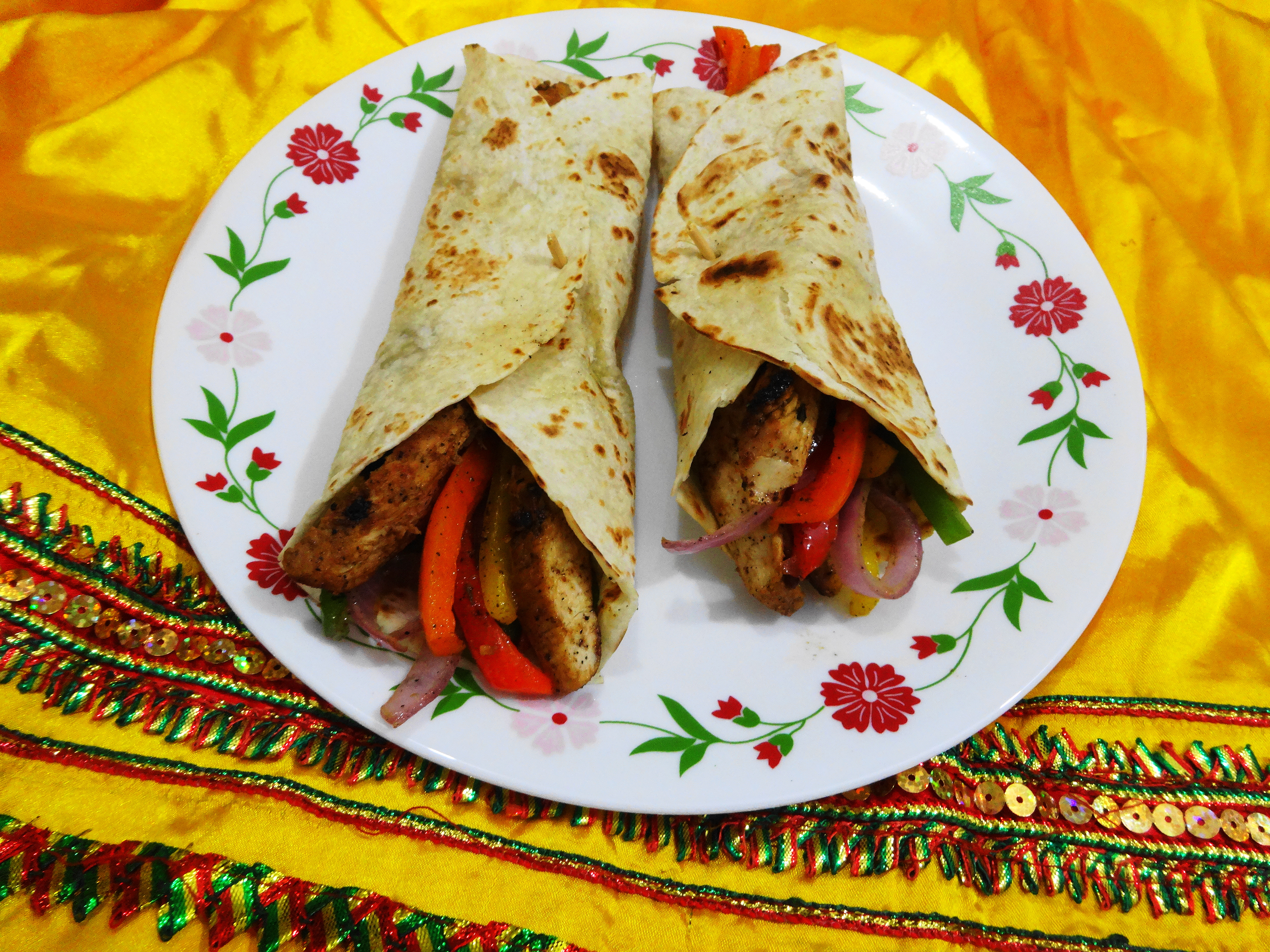
Fajitas, wheat tortillas used as taco wraps

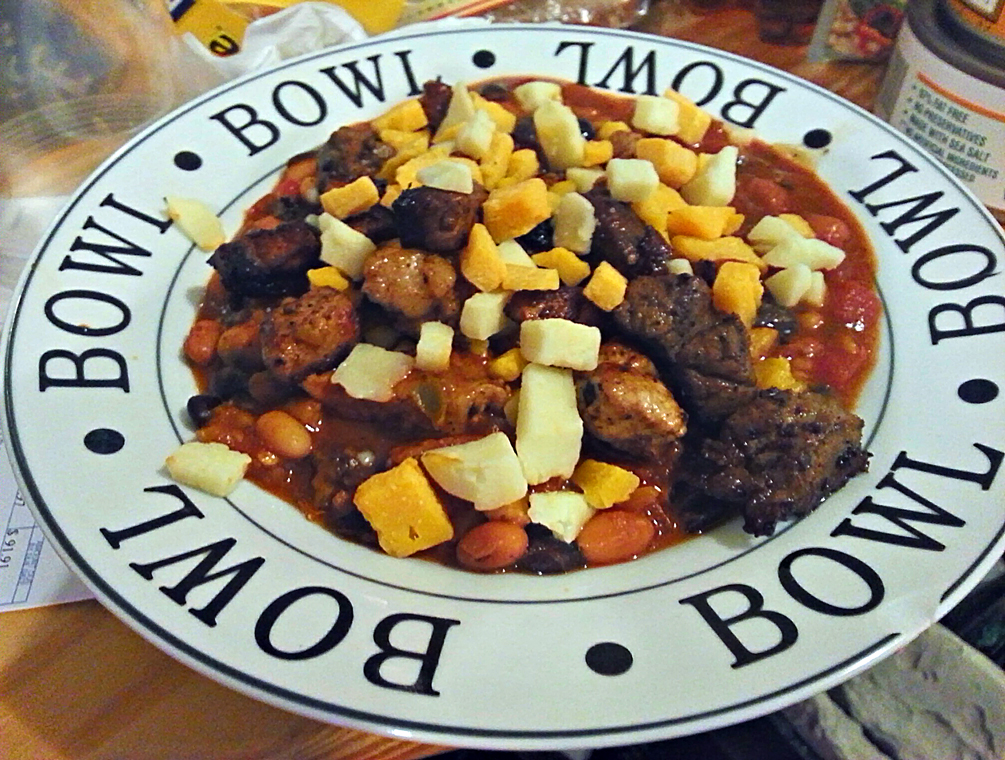
Plate of chili con carne served Tex-Mex style, topped with pork, beef, cheddar, and monterey jack

From the South Texas region between San Antonio, the Rio Grande Valley and El Paso, this cuisine has had little variation, and from earliest times has always been influenced by the cooking in the neighboring northern states of Mexico.

The ranching culture of South Texas and Northern Mexico straddles both sides of the border, where beef, grilled food, and tortillas have been common and popular foods for more than a century.

A taste for cabrito (kid goat), barbacoa de cabeza (barbecued beef heads), carne seca (dried beef), and other products of cattle culture is also common on both sides of the Rio Grande.

In the 20th century, as goods from the United States became cheap and readily available, Tex-Mex took on such Americanized elements as Cheddar, jack, and pimento cheeses.

In much of Texas, the cooking styles on both sides of the U.S.-Mexico border were the same until a period after the U.S. Civil War. With the railroads, American ingredients and cooking appliances became common on the U.S. side.

Around the 1970s the composition of dishes popular in Tex Mex changed; Ninfa's popularized the fajita beginning in 1973.

A 1968 Los Angeles Times feature wrote "[i]f the dish is a combination of Old World cooking, hush-my-mouth Southern cuisine and Tex-Mex, it's from the Texas Hill Country."

== Regional variations in Texas ==
Tex-Mex cuisine varies across different parts of Texas because of differences in geography, local ingredients, and cultural influences. In South Texas and the Rio Grande Valley, dishes such as grilled arrachera (skirt steak) and carne guisada (stewed meat) are common. Along the Gulf Coast, restaurants use local seafood, including red snapper, oysters, and shrimp. These ingredients are used in dishes such as shrimp enchiladas, fish tacos, ceviche, and seafood cocktails.

In El Paso and other parts of Southwest Texas, stacked enchiladas are a regional specialty. They are made by layering fried corn tortillas with cheese or meat filling instead of rolling each enchilada individually. In West Texas, machaca, also called machacado, is made from shredded dried beef that is cooked again in spicy salsa. It may be served in tacos or with scrambled eggs.

Central Texas has also been influenced by Mexican immigrants, including people from Jalisco and Michoacán. Some meat markets in the region have taquerias that serve dishes such as carnitas, barbacoa de chivo, and birria. These dishes use pork, goat, or sheep and reflect regional cooking traditions from Mexico.

San Antonio has played an important role in Tex-Mex food culture. From the 1880s through the early 1940s, the Chili Queens sold bowls of stew in the city's plazas. Another food associated with San Antonio is the puffy taco, which is made from fresh corn masa that is fried until it expands and becomes puffy.

=== Outside the US ===
Paris's first Tex-Mex restaurant opened in March 1983. According to restaurateur Claude Benayoun, business had been slow, but after the 1986 release of the film Betty Blue, which featured characters drinking tequila shots and eating chili con carne, "everything went crazy." According to Benayoun, "Betty Blue was like our Easy Rider; it was unbelievably popular in France. And after the movie came out, everybody in Paris wanted a shot of tequila and a bowl of chili."

Tex-Mex became widely introduced in the Nordic countries and the United Kingdom in the early 1990s through brands like Old El Paso and Santa Maria, and very quickly became a staple meal in the Nordics. Minor local variations on Tex-Mex in these areas are to use gouda cheese, or to substitute taco shells with stuffed pita breads. Previously, Tex-Mex had been sold on a limited scale in Stavanger, Norway since the late 1960s.

Tex-Mex has also spread to Canada, where it has become as naturalized as in the United States. The cuisine is also readily found in Argentina, India, Japan, Mexico, the Netherlands, Thailand, and many other countries.

== Terminology ==
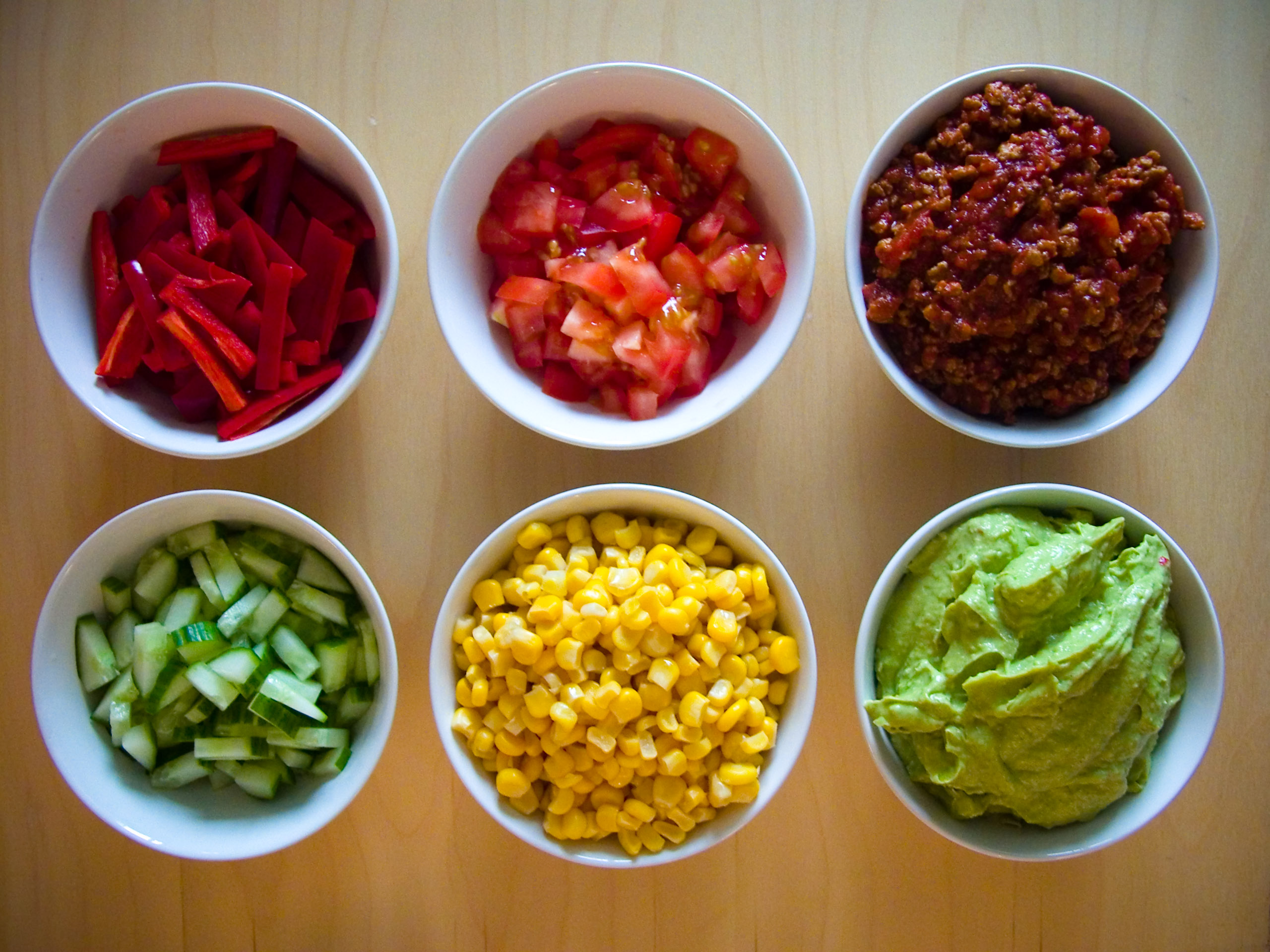
Ingredients commonly used in Tex-Mex cuisine

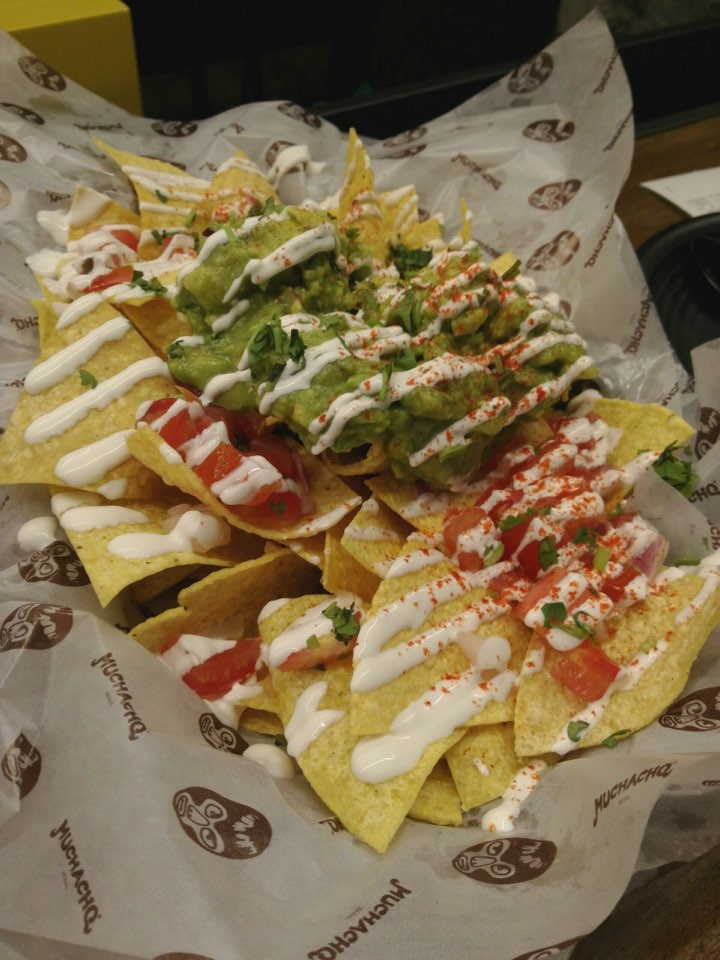
Nachos with guacamole

The word "TexMex" (unhyphenated) was first used to abbreviate the Texas Mexican Railway, chartered in southern Texas in 1875. In the 1920s, the hyphenated form was used in American newspapers to describe Texans of Mexican ancestry.

The Oxford English Dictionary supplies the first-known uses in print of "Tex-Mex" in reference to food, from a 1963 article in The New York Times Magazine, and a 1966 item in the Great Bend (Kansas) Tribune.

However, the term was used in an article in New York's Binghamton Press in May 1960 and a syndicated article appearing in several American newspapers on October 6, 1960, uses the Tex-Mex label to describe a series of recipes, including chili and enchiladas.

The recipes included the suggestion of "cornmeal pancakes" in place of tortillas, which at the time were not reliably available to readers outside of the Southwest.

Diana Kennedy, an influential food authority, explained the distinctions between Mexican cuisine and Americanized Mexican food in her 1972 book The Cuisines of Mexico. Robb Walsh of the Houston Press said the book "was a breakthrough cookbook, one that could have been written only by a non-Mexican. It unified Mexican cooking by transcending the nation's class divisions and treating the food of the poor with the same respect as the food of the upper classes."

The term "Tex-Mex" also saw increasing usage in the Los Angeles Times from the 1970s onward while the Tex-Mex label became a part of U.S. vernacular during the late 1960s, '70s, and '80s. Adán Medrano, a chef who grew up in San Antonio, prefers to call the food "Texas Mexican," which he says was the indigenous cooking of South Texas long before the Rio Grande marked the border between Texas and Mexico.

== Modern Tex-Mex cuisine ==
During the late 20th century, some chefs began updating Tex-Mex dishes by using fresh, seasonal, and locally available ingredients. This included using higher-quality meats, seafood, and produce while keeping familiar Tex-Mex flavors. Examples included grilled meat seasoned with lime, onions, and chiles, Gulf shrimp served with tomatillo sauce, and newer versions of enchiladas and quesadillas made with ingredients such as pheasant and crabmeat.

Some restaurants also combined Tex-Mex ingredients with other styles of cooking. For example, Chef Brian of Olenjack's Grill in Arlington.Show how Tex-mex is not just strictly what some say " authentic" recipes and ingredients but rather take some of central America and the Americanized ways and make it into its own catagory .

== Influential chefs ==
- Felix Tijerina was a successful restaurateur and civic leader who helped pioneer Tex-Mex cuisine through his dishes.

Born in 1905, Tijerina began working as a busboy at the Original Mexican Restaurant after moving to Houston in 1922. He rose through the ranks and opened his restaurant, the Mexican Inn, in 1929.
After serving in World War II, Tijerina opened a chain of restaurants named the Felix Mexican Restaurant.
With mildly-spiced dishes and reasonable prices, Tijerina's restaurants catered more towards an Anglo audience. His spaghetti con chile special exemplifies how Tijerina americanized traditional Mexican food to appeal to the local Texans.
Tijerina used his influence and economic profit from the restaurant business to become active in politics. In 1935, Tijerina joined the local council of LULAC (League of United Latin American Citizens), and eventually became the national president of the organization, holding the position from 1956 to 1960.
Tijerina died in 1965, but his chain of Felix Mexican Restaurants continued to promote Tex-Mex cuisine until operations stopped in 2008.

- Josef Centeno grew up in San Antonio, becoming familiar with Tex-Mex cuisine through his Tejano family's cooking.

In 2011, Centeno opened his first restaurant, Bäco Mercat, which became an instant success due to the multicultural menu.
Centeno's most recent Tex-Mex restaurant, Amácita, opened in July 2019.
Centeno also wrote two cookbooks: Baco: Vivid Recipes from the Heart of Los Angeles (2017) and Amá: a Modern Tex-Mex Kitchen (2019).
Centeno has become a leading chef in Tex-Mex cuisine, receiving praise for both his restaurants and his cookbooks. While the New Yorker listed Centeno's Amá: a Modern Tex-Mex Kitchen as one of the best cookbooks in 2019, the Los Angeles Times named Orsa & Winston as the "Restaurant of the Year" in 2020.

== Related cuisines ==
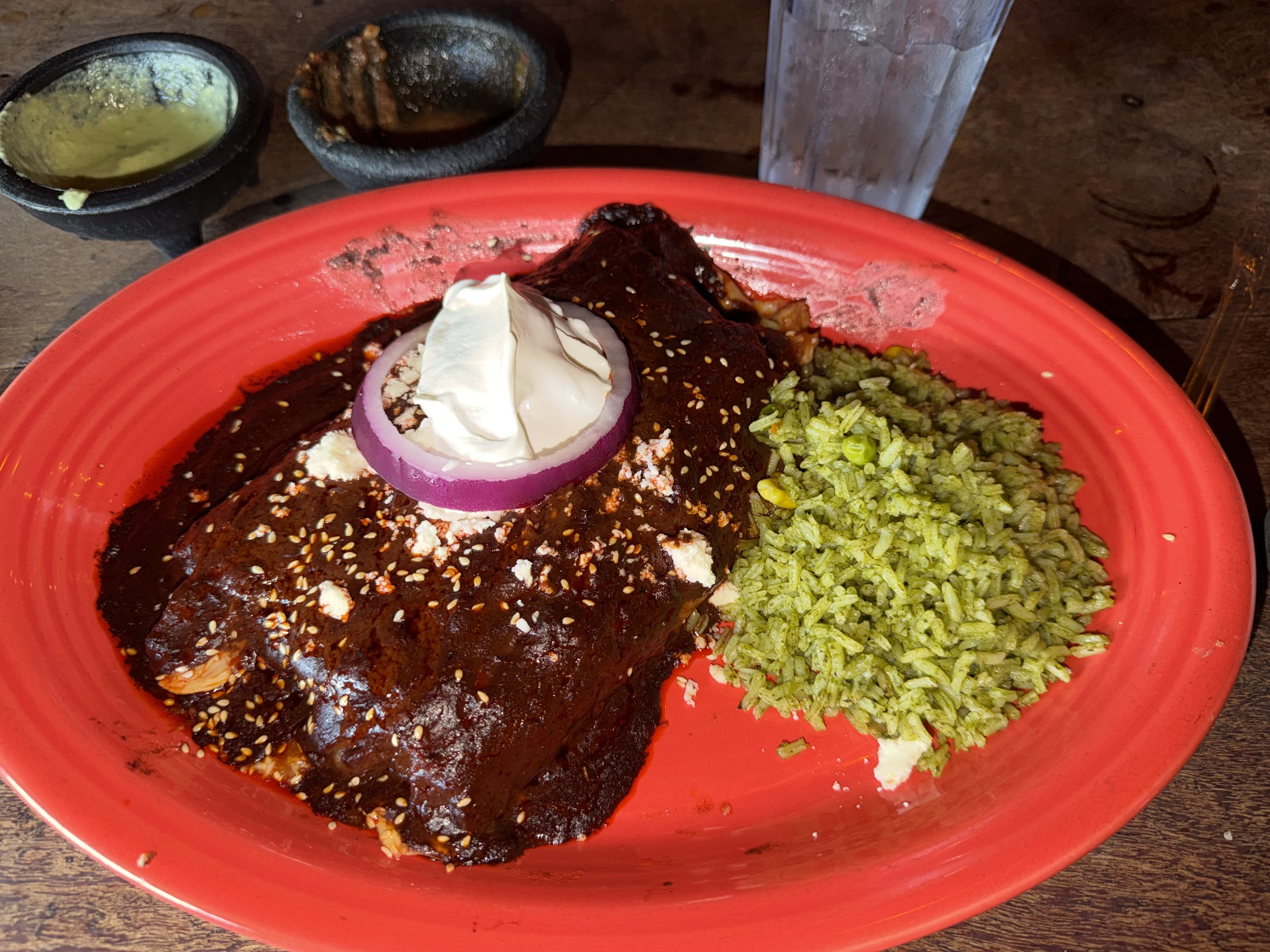
- Mole Poblano enchiladas from El Tiempo Cantina in Houston, TX
  Mexican cuisine
- New Mexican cuisine
- Southwestern cuisine
- American cuisine
- Texan cuisine

== See also ==
- Tex-Mex cuisine in Houston
- List of Mexican restaurants
