= List of Mexican restaurants =

This is a list of notable Mexican restaurants. Mexican cuisine is primarily a fusion of indigenous Mesoamerican cooking with European, especially Spanish, elements added after the Spanish conquest of the Aztec Empire in the 16th century. The basic staples remain native foods such as corn, beans and chili peppers, but the Europeans introduced many other foods, the most important of which were meat from domesticated animals (beef, pork, chicken, goat and sheep), dairy products (especially cheese) and various herbs and many spices.

== Mexican restaurants ==
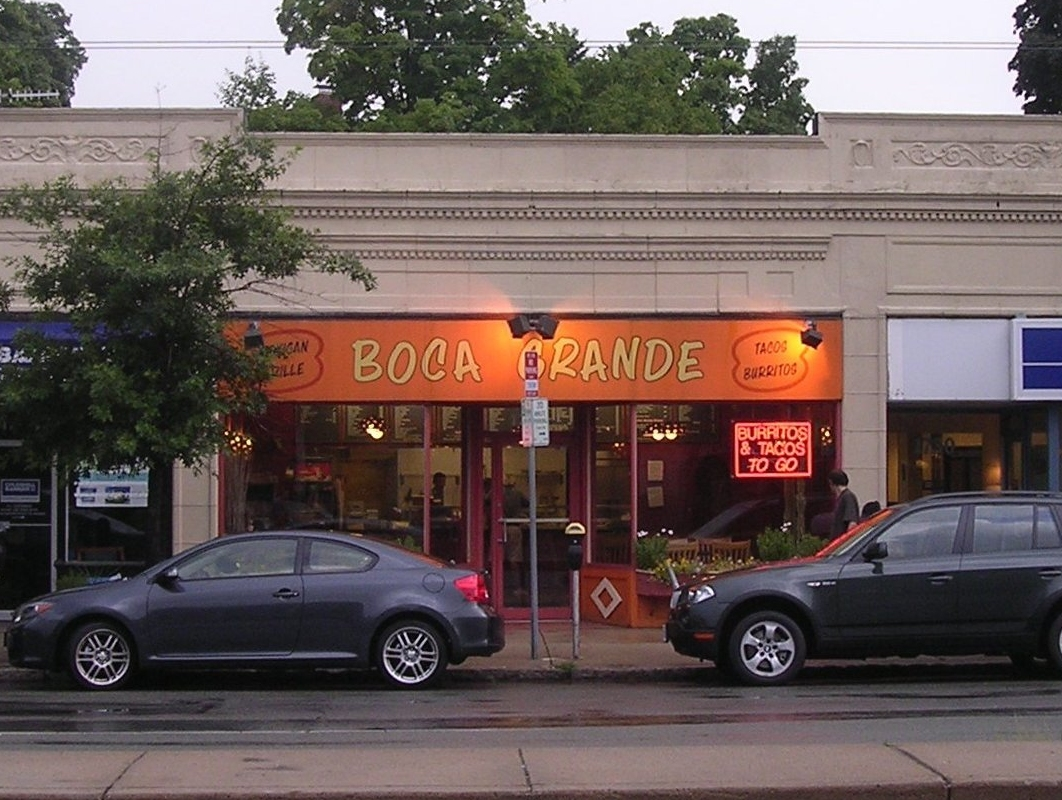
A Boca Grande Taqueria location in Cambridge, Massachusetts

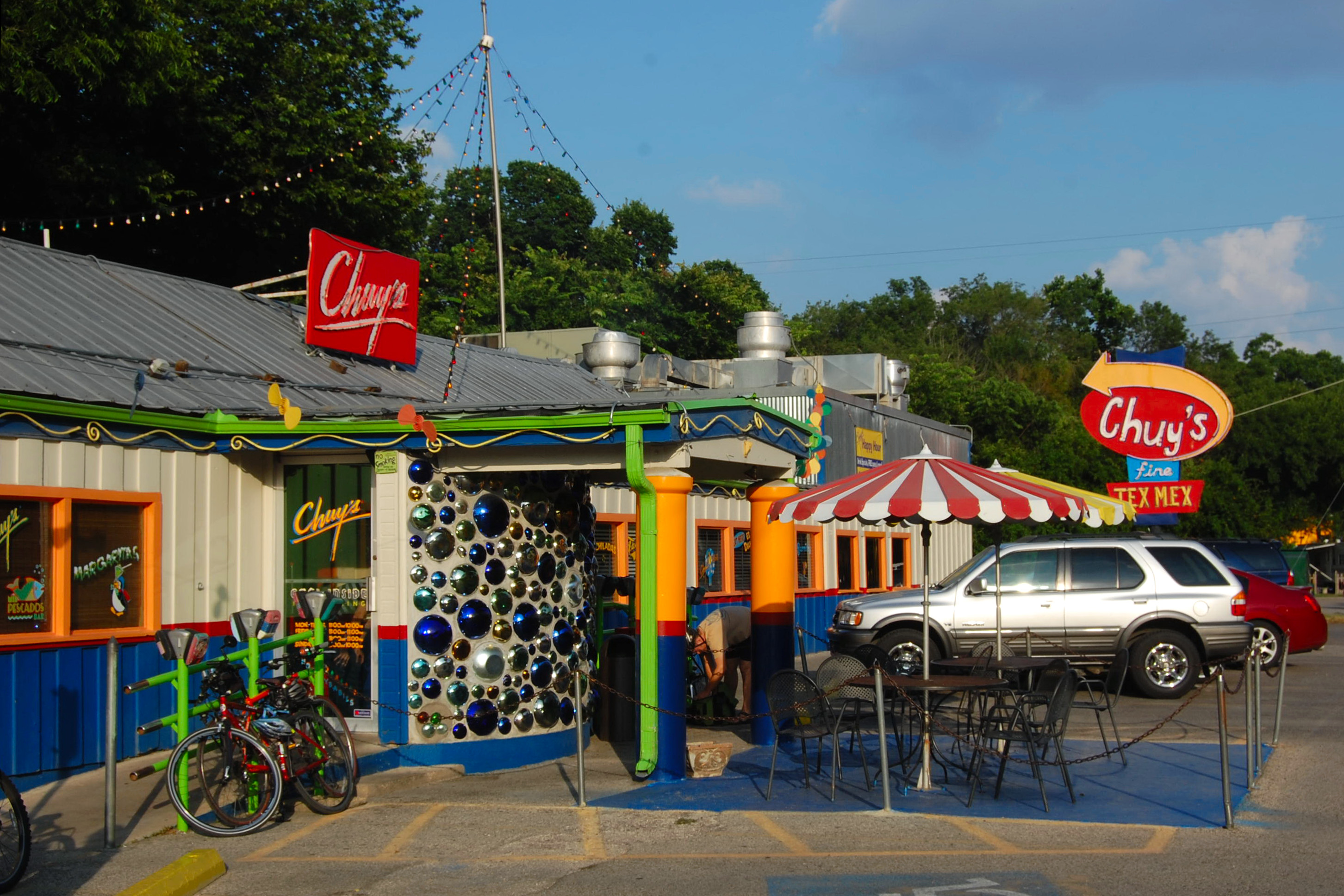
The original Chuy's in Austin, Texas

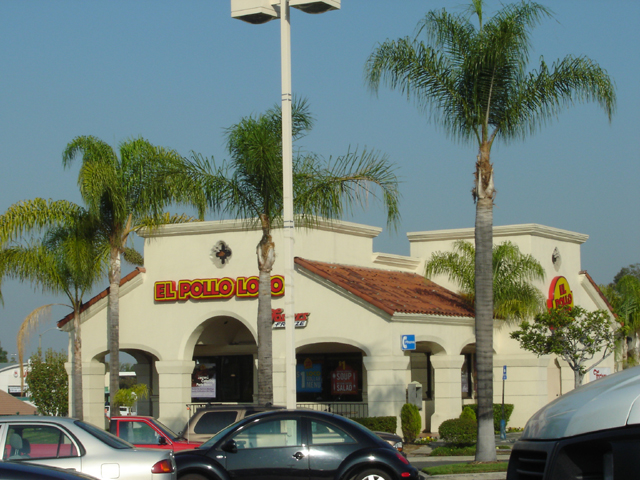
An El Pollo Loco location in Hacienda Heights, California

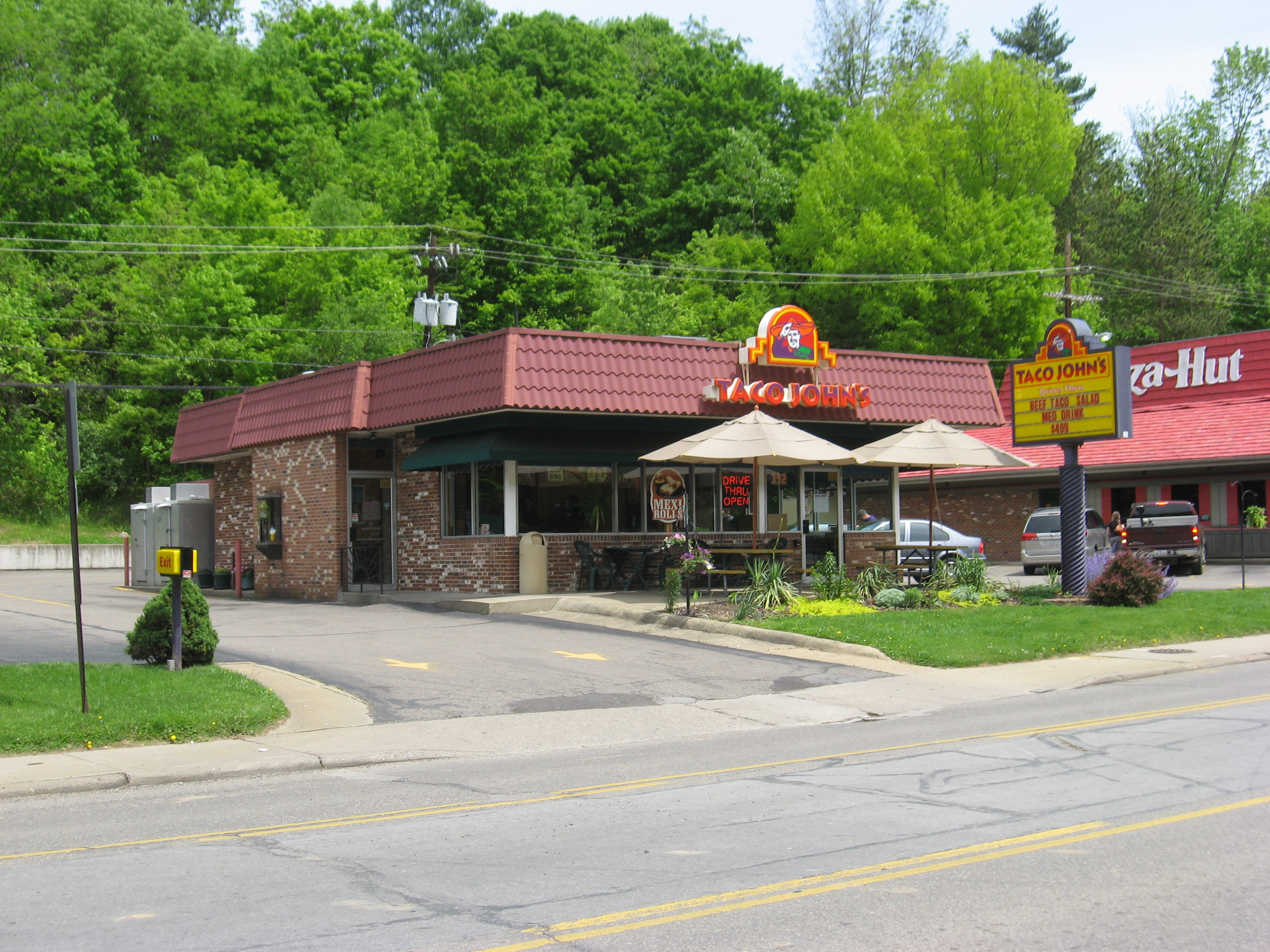
A Taco John's location in Athens, Ohio

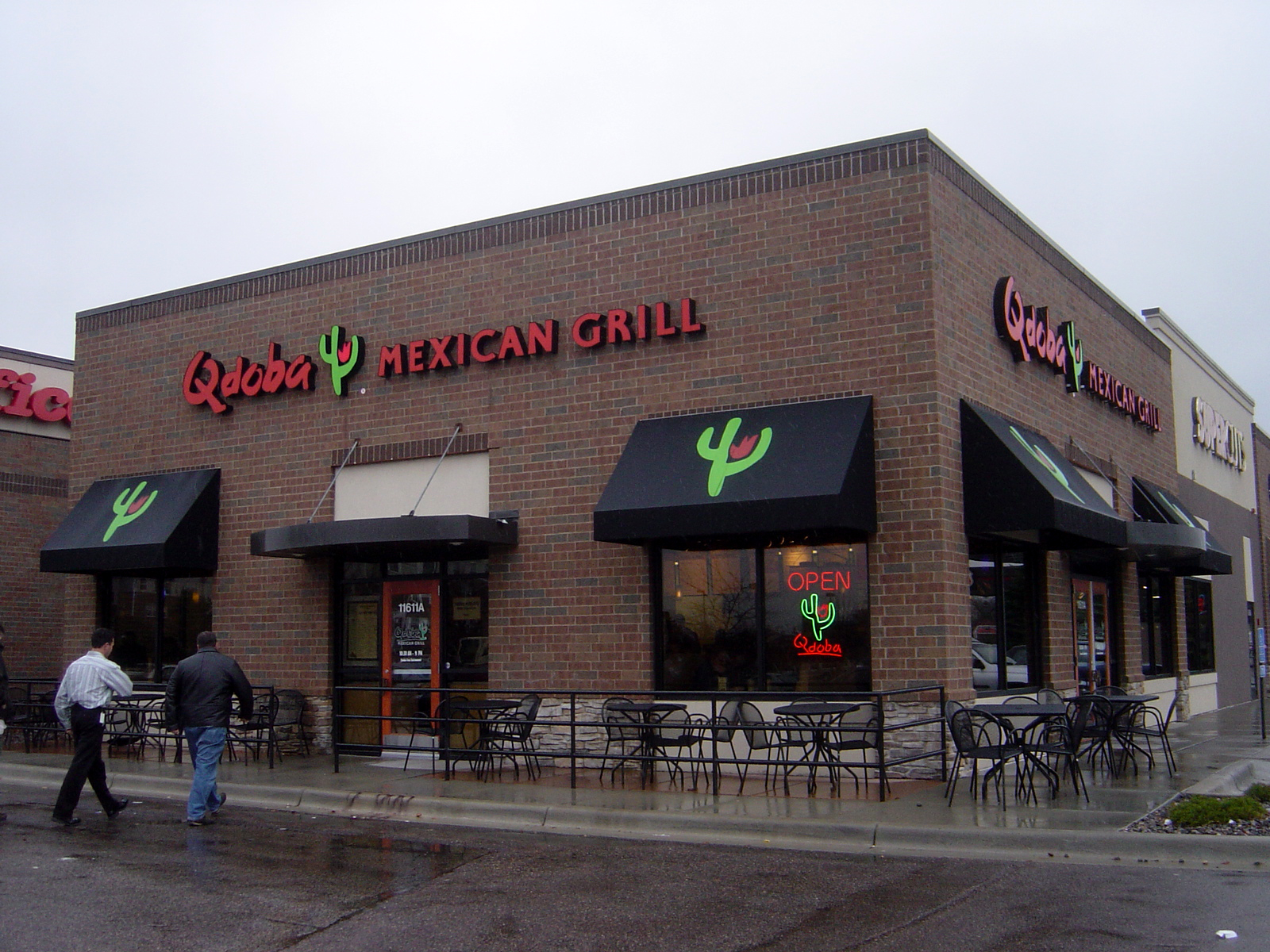
A Qdoba, with the chain's former "Qdoba Mexican Grill" signage, in Eden Prairie, Minnesota

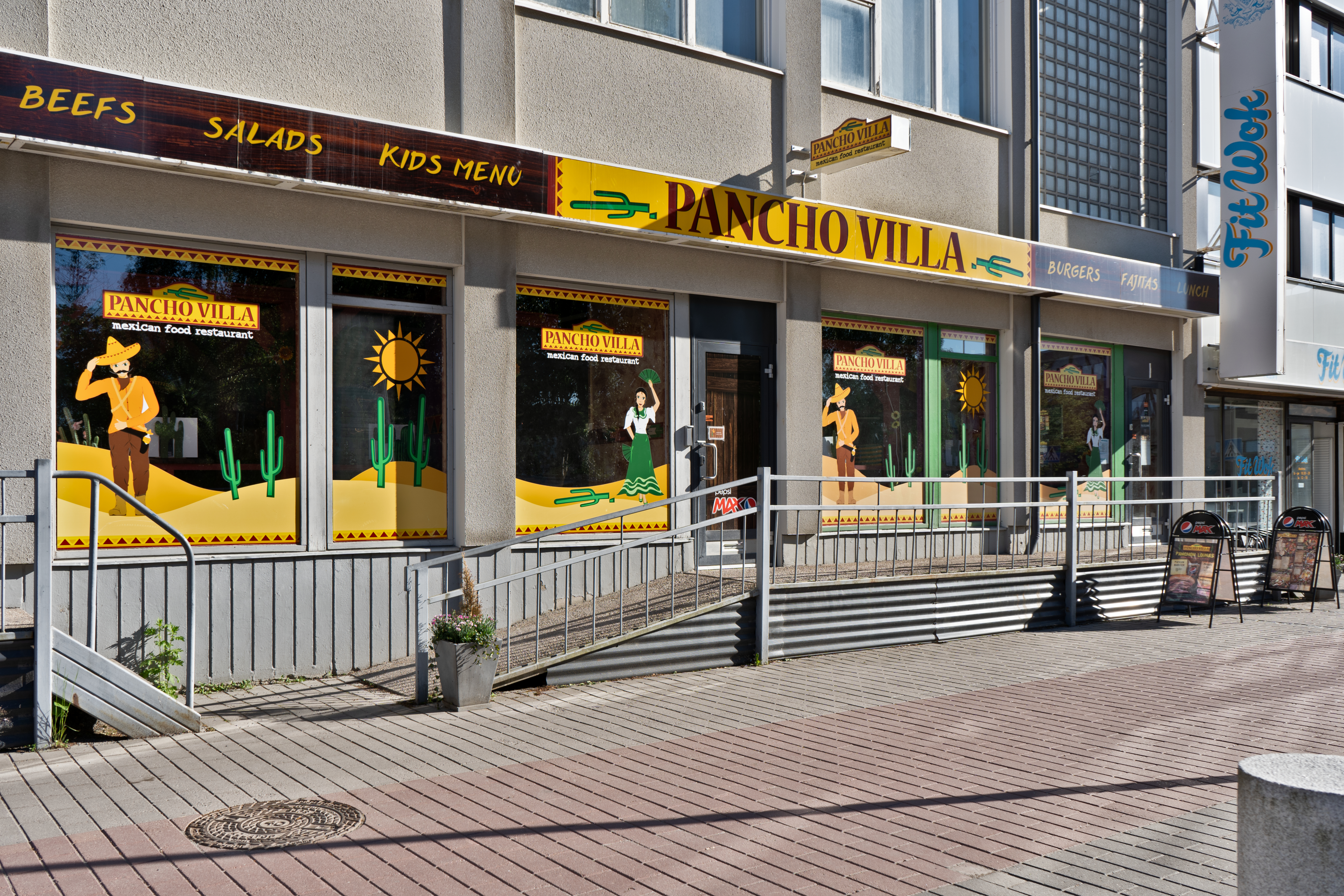
Pancho Villa restaurant in Seinäjoki, Finland

- Acapulco Mexican Restaurant and Cantina
- El Adobe de Capistrano
- Amor y Tacos
- Anna's Taqueria
- Baja Fresh
- Baker's Drive-Thru
- Boca Grande Taqueria
- BurritoVille
- Cafe Rio
- California Tortilla
- Californios
- Cantina Mariachi
- Carlos'n Charlie's
- Casa Bonita
- Chevys Fresh Mex
- Chi-Chi's Europe
- El Charro Café
- El Chico
- Chipotle Mexican Grill
- Chiquito
- Chuy's
- El Coyote Cafe
- El Pollo Loco (Mexico)
- El Pollo Loco (United States)
- El Taco Tote
- El Bajío
- El Fenix
- Filiberto's
- Grupo Sanborns
- ICÚ
- Kiki's Mexican Restaurant
- King Taco
- La Bamba Mexican Restaurant
- La Salsa
- Lucha Libre Taco Shop
- Maggie Rita's
- Margaritas
- Maui Tacos
- Moe's Southwest Grill
- Molina's Cantina
- Ninfa's
- Nuestra Cocina
- On the Border Mexican Grill & Cantina
- Pancheros Mexican Grill
- Pancho's Mexican Buffet
- Pink Taco
- Pujol
- Restaurante Arroyo
- Rosa's Cafe
- Rubio's Coastal Grill
- Salsarita's Fresh Mexican Grill
- Sausalitos
- Serrano
- Surf Taco
- Qdoba
- Taco Bill
- Taco Cabana
- Taco del Mar
- Taco María
- Taco Nazo
- Taco Palenque
- Tacos Chukis
- Tacos El Cuñado
- La Tapatia, Inc.
- Taqueria Arandas
- Tijuana Flats
- Tio's Tacos
- El Torito
- Tumbleweed Tex Mex Grill & Margarita Bar

== Fast food Mexican restaurants ==
- Barberitos
- Barburrito
- California Burrito
- Del Taco
- District Taco
- Green Burrito
- Guzman y Gomez
- Jimboy's Tacos
- Juan Pollo
- Mad Mex Fresh Mexican Grill
- Mighty Taco
- Naugles
- Taco Bell
- Taco Bueno
- Taco Bus
- Taco John's
- Taco Mayo
- Taco Time
- Taco Time Northwest
- Zambrero
- Zantigo

== Former Mexican restaurants ==
- Chi-Chi's
- De Noche, Portland, Oregon
- Don Pablo's
- Mi Mero Mole, Portland, Oregon
- Original Taco House, Portland, Oregon
- Pup 'N' Taco
- Real Mex Restaurants
- Rio Bravo Cantina
- Two Pesos

== See also ==
- Canby Asparagus Farm and Casa de Tamales, Milwaukie, Oregon
- Latin American cuisine
- List of Mexican dishes
- List of restaurants in Mexico
- Lists of restaurants
- Taco stand
- Taquería
