= Lilia Comedor =

Restaurant in Portland, Oregon, U.S.

- Interactive map of Lilia Comedor

Restaurant information
- Established: October 2022
- Food type: Mexican; Pacific Northwest
- Location: 3159 South Moody Avenue, Portland, Oregon, 97239, United States
- Coordinates: 45°30′0.5″N 122°40′19″W
- Website: www.liliapdx.com

Lilia Comedor, or Lilia, is a Mexican and Pacific Northwest restaurant in Portland, Oregon, United States.

== Description ==
The restaurant Lilia Comedor operates in Portland, Oregon. Janey Wong of Eater Portland has described the business as República's "sister restaurant", serving Pacific Northwest cuisine "through a Mexican American lens".

== History ==
Lilia Comedor was established in October 2022.

In May 2025, the business announced plans to relocate from South Waterfront to the North Park Blocks in June. Lilia Comedor will replace the restaurant De Noche.

== Reception ==
Lilia Comedor was included in The New York Times's 2023 list of the nation's 50 best restaurants, as well as The Infatuation's 2024 list of Portland's best restaurants. Michael Russell ranked Lilia number 13 in The Oregonian's 2025 list of Portland's 40 best restaurants. Hannah Wallace included the business in Condé Nast Traveler's 2025 list of Portland's 23 best restaurants.

== See also ==
- List of Mexican restaurants
- List of Pacific Northwest restaurants
