= Amano (restaurant) =

Restaurant in Caldwell, Idaho, U.S.

- Interactive map of Amano

Restaurant information
- Food type: Mexican
- Location: 802 Arthur Street, Caldwell, Idaho, 83605, United States
- Coordinates: 43°40′0″N 116°41′18″W
- Website: amanorestaurante.com

Amano is a Mexican restaurant in Caldwell, Idaho, United States. The restaurant was established in September 2019 by Salvador "Sal" Alamilla. The business was included in The New York Times's 2023 list of the 50 best restaurants in the United States. In 2025, Amano's chef Salvador Alamilla won James Beard's regional Best Chef award.

== See also ==
- List of Mexican restaurants
