= Maïz64 =

Mexican restaurant in Washington, D.C., U.S.

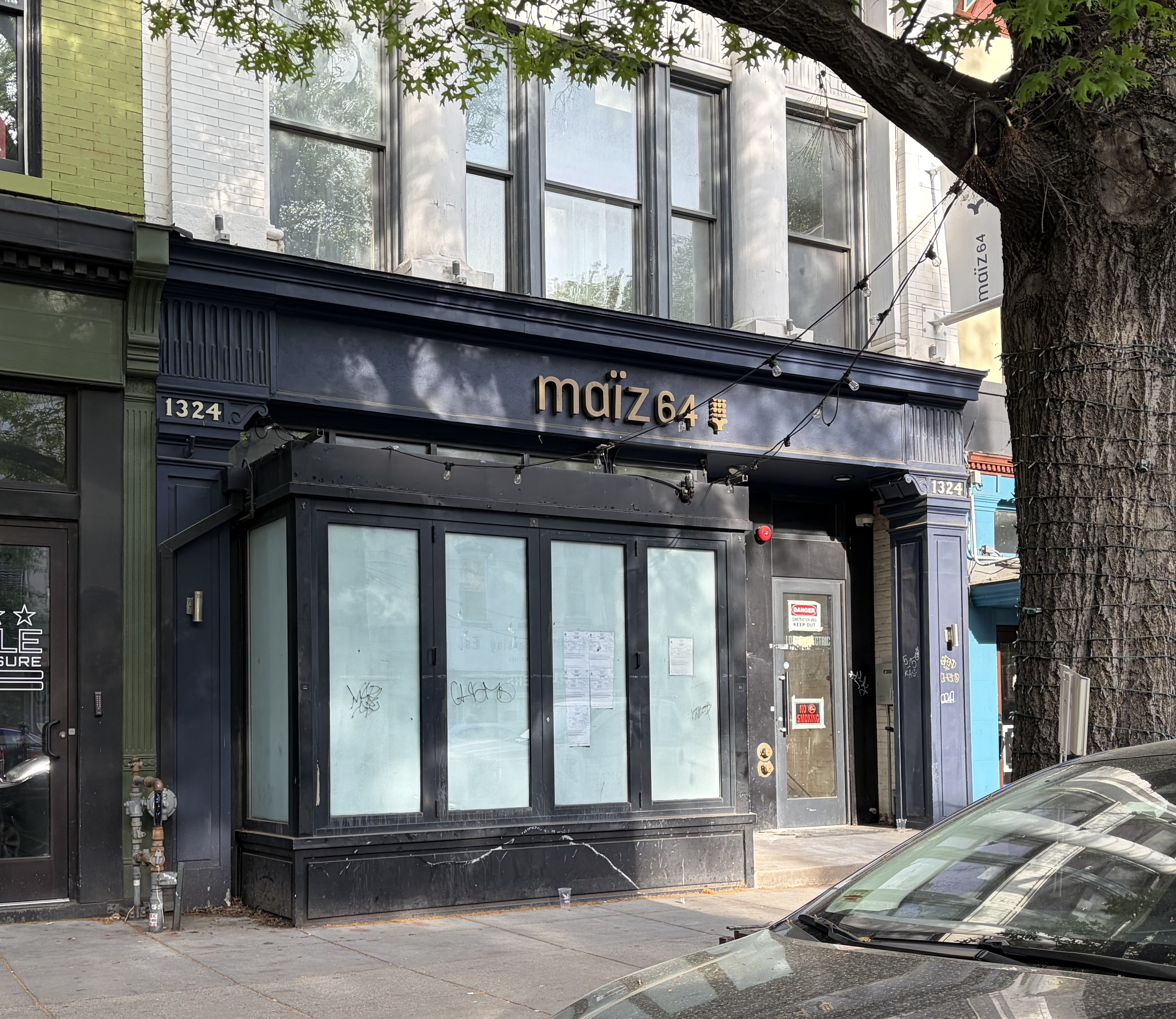
- The closed storefront of Maïz64 after its 2024 closure due to fire damage
- Interactive map of Maïz64

Restaurant information
- Established: October 2021
- Closed: March 2024
- Food type: Mexican
- Location: 1324 14th Street NW, Washington, D.C., 20005, United States
- Coordinates: 38°54′29.2″N 77°1′55.8″W
- Website: maiz64.com

Maïz64 was a Mexican fine dining restaurant in Washington, D.C. It opened in October 2021 and closed in March 2024 following damage from a fire.

== See also ==
- List of Mexican restaurants
