= De Noche (restaurant) =

Defunct Mexican restaurant in Portland, Oregon, U.S.

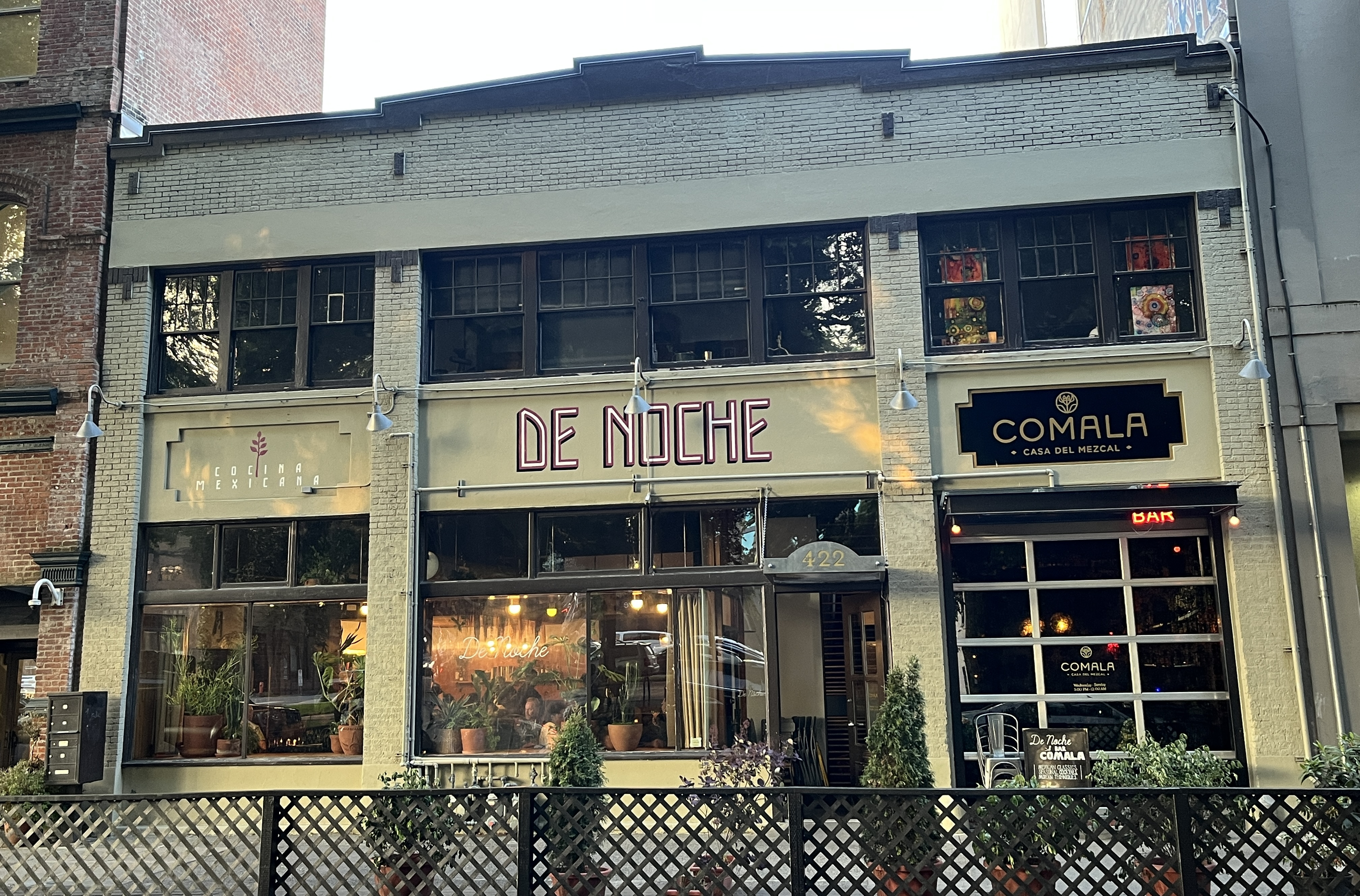
- Exterior of De Noche and Bar Comala, 2025
- Interactive map of De Noche

Restaurant information
- Established: 2022
- Closed: 2025
- Owners: República & Co.
- Head chef: Dani Morales
- Food type: Mexican
- Location: 422 Northwest 8th Avenue, Portland, Multnomah, Oregon, 97209, United States
- Coordinates: 45.5263°N 122.6784°W
- Website: denochepdx.com

De Noche was a Mexican restaurant in Portland, Oregon, United States. The restaurant group República & Co. opened the restaurant in northwest Portland's Pearl District in 2022, alongside an attached bar called Bar Comala. Dani Morales was the executive chef of De Noche, which served small plates with mostly Pacific Northwest ingredients. Menu options included aguachile with salmon, mole, sopa de fideo, short ribs with birria, and tlayudas. The restaurant received a generally positive reception and was named one of the city's 50 best restaurants by Karen Brooks of Portland Monthly in 2024. República & Co. closed De Noche permanently in 2025.

== Description ==
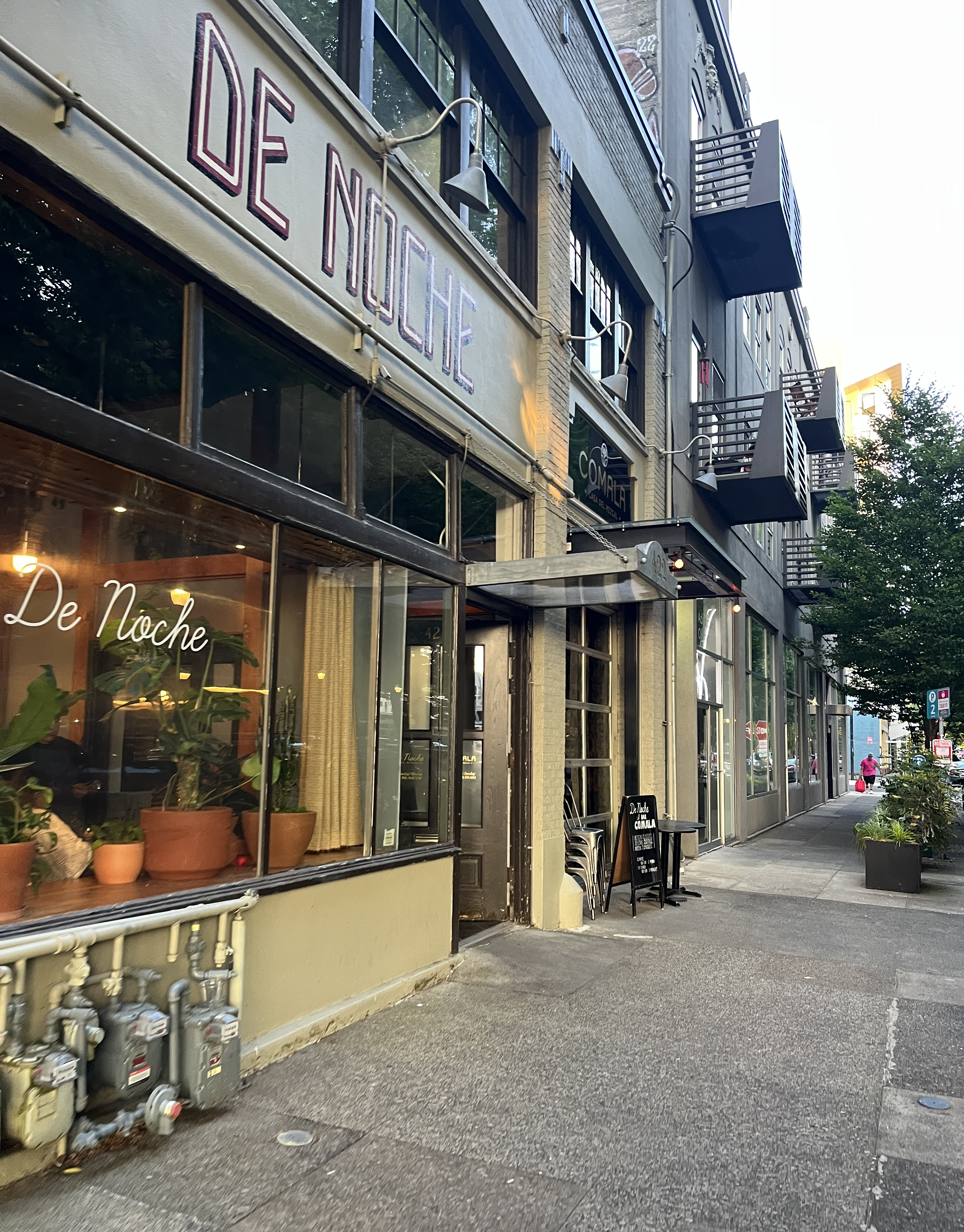
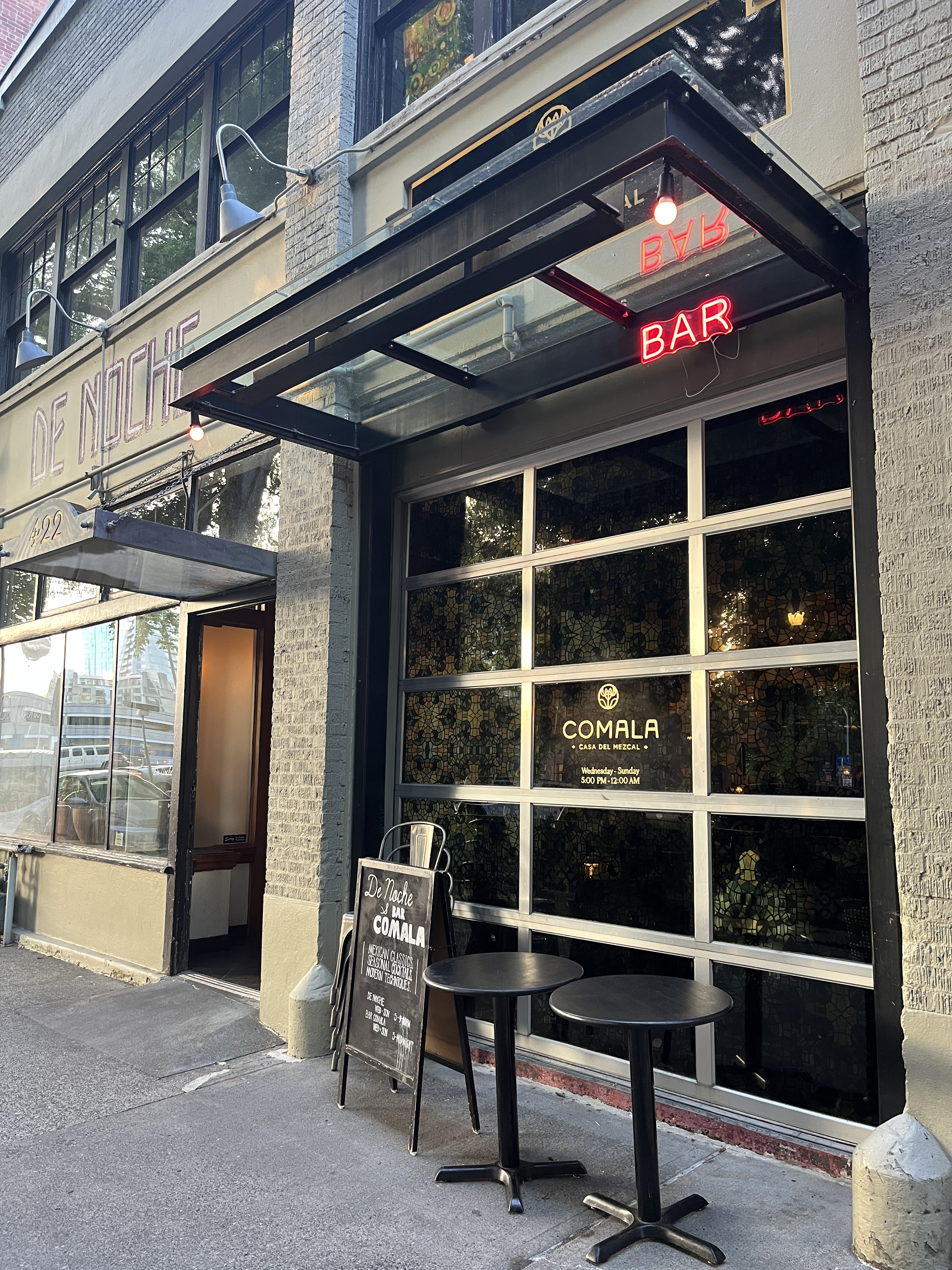
Exteriors of De Noche (top) and Bar Comala (bottom), 2025

The modern Mexican restaurant De Noche operated on 8th Avenue, along the North Park Blocks in northwest Portland's Pearl District at the border with Old Town Chinatown. The interior contains an open kitchen and dining nooks as group seating, and the dining room had brick walls and wooden tables. Prix fixe dinners included 9 to 10 dishes.

The masa-centered menu included small plates such as memelas Veracruzanas, rotating varieties of mole often made with Oregon produce, and sopa de fideo. De Noche primarily used Pacific Northwest ingredients, except for the corn, which was imported from Mexico. The restaurant served aguachile with salmon, grapefruits, and a pepper sauce, as well as short ribs with birria, mole negro steak, and tlayudas with avocado, kampachi, and watercress. The birria is based on a family recipe used by the chef and her mother. De Noche served drinks made in an attached cocktail bar called Bar Comala, which was operated by the same restaurant group.

=== Bar Comala ===
De Noche and Bar Comala were connected by an interior hallway. Portland Monthly described the shared space as "serene" and "transportive". Bar Comala had a large display of bottles on shelves and had Mexican black-and-white films projected on the front wall. The bar also offered drinks made with Mexican gin, mezcal, raicilla, rum, sotol, tequila, and whisky. In 2024, Portland Monthly said the business had "one of the largest bar collections of these distillates" in the nation and only offered products by Mexican-owned brands. The drink menu included a Negroni, as well as wines by BIPOC-, LGBTQ-, and woman-owned businesses.

Food options available at Bar Comala included botanas (tapas, or appetizers) such as fried masa puffs with aioli, mole coloradito wings with sesame seeds, and tacos with skirt steak.

== History ==
De Noche was operated by the restaurant group República & Co. (of which restaurateur Angel Medina is a co-owner), which has also operated Lilia Comedor and República. De Noche operated in the space that previously housed Park Kitchen. The restaurant and its bar were considered "sibling" or "sister" establishments to these restaurants.

In October 2022, República & Co. announced plans to open De Noche in the space that had previously housed La Fondita. It was targeted to open on November 10, and De Noche would revive a dinner menu previously offered at the restaurant República. In May 2025, República & Co. announced plans to close De Noche and move Lilia Comedor into the space from South Waterfront in June. Dani Morales, the executive chef of De Noche, was named executive chef of the restaurant República.

== Reception ==
While Michael Russell of The Oregonian did not include De Noche in a 2023 list of Portland's best new restaurants, he included the business in an overview of "five more Portland restaurants we enjoyed in 2023" as an extension of the list. In 2024, Jordan Michelman of Portland Monthly called the food "simultaneously subversive and foundational" and said Morales gives "textbook perfect" dishes with "thought-provoking inversions". Moreover, Michelman praised the restaurant's "utterly impressive and ambitious" atmosphere, stating that it "is uncommon in Portland restaurants".

In 2024, food critic Karen Brooks included De Noche in Portland Monthly's list of the city's 50 best restaurants, and Nathan Williams included the mole in Eater Portland's guide to the city's Oaxacan cuisine. Eater Portland's Janey Wong and Zoe Baillargeon included the restaurant in a 2024 "guide to the ultimate staycation" in Old Town Chinatown and 2025 overview of the best restaurants in Old Town Chinatown, respectively. In 2025, the destination marketing organization Travel Portland highlighted De Noche and Bar Comala as two of Portland's "great" Latin American-owned restaurants.

== See also ==
- Hispanics and Latinos in Portland, Oregon
- List of defunct restaurants of the United States
- List of Mexican restaurants
