= Oro by Nixta =

Restaurant in Minneapolis, Minnesota, U.S.

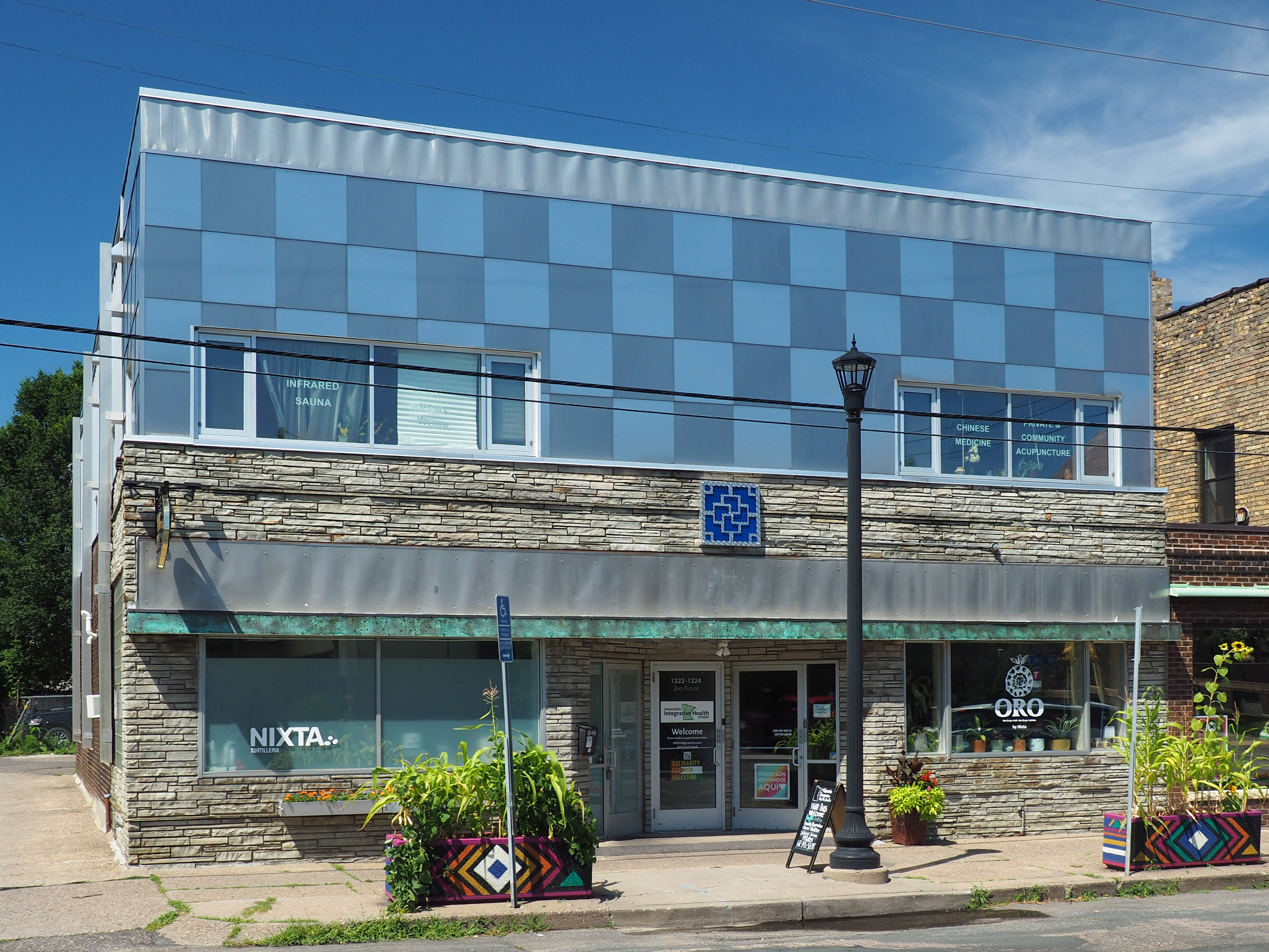
- The building housing Oro by Nixta
- Interactive map of Oro by Nixta

Restaurant information
- Food type: Mexican
- Location: 1222 NE 2nd St., Minneapolis, Minnesota, 55413, United States
- Coordinates: 45°00′02″N 93°15′59″W

Oro by Nixta is a Mexican restaurant in Minneapolis. It was a semifinalist in the Best New Restaurant category of the James Beard Foundation Awards in 2024. It was also named one of the twenty best new restaurants of 2024 by Bon Appétit.

== See also ==
- List of Mexican restaurants
