= Taco María =

Restaurant in Costa Mesa, California, U.S.

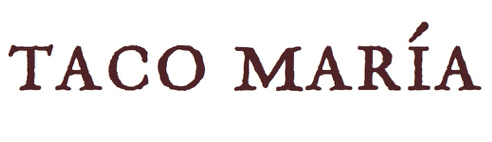
- Interactive map of Taco María

Restaurant information
- Established: 2013
- Closed: July 29, 2023
- Head chef: Carlos Salgado
- Food type: Mexican
- Rating: (Michelin Guide)
- Location: 3313 Hyland Avenue, Costa Mesa, Orange County, California, 92626, United States
- Coordinates: 33°41′41″N 117°55′32.7″W

Taco María was a Michelin Guide-starred Mexican restaurant in Costa Mesa, California, United States.

== History ==
Taco Maria started as a taco truck before it opened as a brick-and-mortar restaurant. The restaurant opened in 2013. On July 25, 2023, chef Carlos Salgado announced the restaurant would close on July 29, 2023. As reported by the Los Angeles Times, Salgado plans to relocate the restaurant to a larger space however, as of the time of closure, he had not yet found a suitable location. Salgado had the opportunity to extend the lease but declined due to maintenance and cost.

== Reception ==
In 2019, the Michelin Guide awarded Taco María 1 Michelin Star, a rating it retained until its closure in 2023.

== See also ==
- List of defunct restaurants of the United States
- List of Mexican restaurants
- List of Michelin-starred restaurants in California
