= Tacos Chukis =

Chain of Mexican restaurants in Seattle, Washington, U.S.

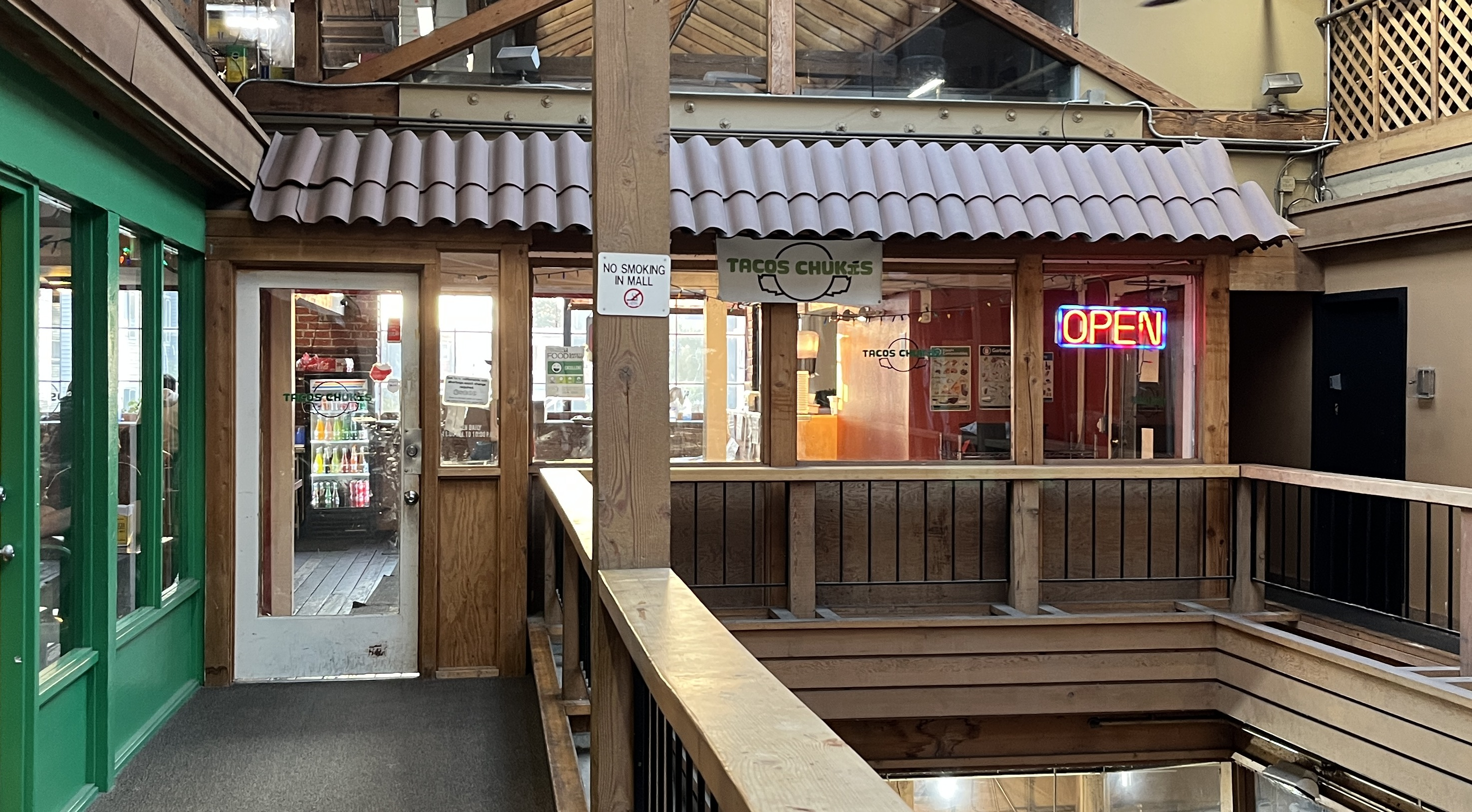
- Entrance to the restaurant on Capitol Hill, 2022

Restaurant information
- Owner: Roberto Salmerón
- Food type: Mexican
- Location: Seattle, Washington, United States

Tacos Chukis is a chain of Mexican restaurants with multiple locations in Seattle, in the U.S. state of Washington.

== Description ==
Tacos Chukis is a fast casual restaurant chain serving Mexican cuisine such as tacos and tortas. Tacos come with meat (or vegetarian), salsa, guacamole, cilantro, and onion; for an additional fee, "Tacos Chukis" have these ingredients plus al pastor pork, cheese, and grilled pineapple.

== History ==
Roberto Salmerón opened the original restaurant in "a tiny, upstairs space" on Capitol Hill in 2011. The business expanded into South Lake Union in 2016, Beacon Hill in 2017, and the Central District in 2018.

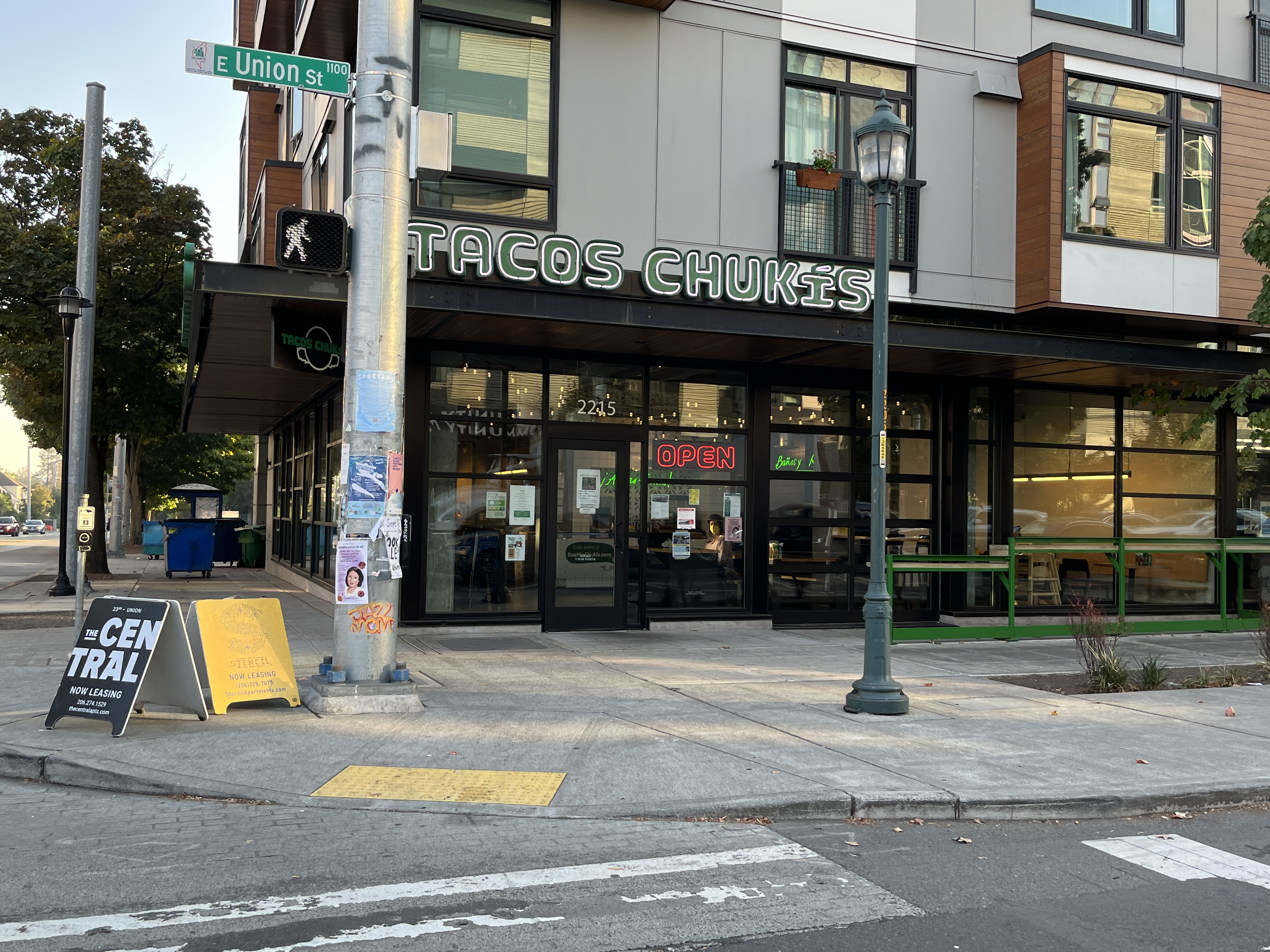
Exterior of the Central District location, 2022

In early 2020, the U.S. Department of Labor's Wage and Hour Division confirmed the business was required to pay over $400,000 to 92 employees for violating overtime requirements. There were four locations at the time.

== Reception ==
Chona Kasinger included the restaurant in Thrillist's 2014 list of "The 8 best burritos in Seattle". Cody Permenter included Tacos Chukis in Thrillist's 2016 "Definitive Guide to Capitol Hill". Thrillist selected the business for Washington in a 2018 list of "The Best Tacos in Every State". In 2019, Ellen Meny of KING-TV said the Tacos Chukis had "achieved cult status, mostly because its stellar tacos sell for a killer price".

During the COVID-19 pandemic, Eater Seattle included the business in a 2020 overview of "Where to Get Terrific Tacos in Seattle for Takeout and Delivery". In 2022, writers for the website included Tacos Chukis in lists of "15 Spots for Fantastic Tacos in the Seattle Area" and "Some of the Best Inexpensive Meals in Seattle". Allecia Vermillion included the restaurant in Seattle Metropolitan's 2022 list of "Seattle's Great Tacos and Mexican Restaurants". Emily Iris Degn included the business in Tasting Table's 2026 list of Seattle's nine best restaurants for tacos.

== See also ==
- List of Mexican restaurants
- List of restaurant chains in the United States
