= Roberto's Taco Shop =

American chain of Mexican restaurants

- Industry: Restaurants
- Founded: 1964; 62 years ago in San Ysidro, San Diego
- Founders: Roberto Robledo; Dolores Robledo
- Headquarters: Las Vegas, Nevada, United States
- Number of locations: 77 (2020)
- Area served: California and Nevada
- Products: Mexican food
- Owner: Robledo family
- Website: robertostacoshop.com

Roberto's Taco Shop is a chain of Mexican restaurants in California and Nevada, with locations primarily in San Diego and the Las Vegas Valley. It is based in Las Vegas, and it has 77 locations as of 2020. The company originated with a tortilleria that was founded in San Ysidro, San Diego, in 1964, by Roberto Robledo and his wife Dolores. They subsequently purchased several restaurants, before renaming them Roberto's Taco Shop around 1970. The chain expanded to the Las Vegas Valley in 1990, and was also operating in Miami by the end of the decade.

== History ==
Roberto's Taco Shop was founded in 1964, by Roberto Robledo (1928–1999) and his wife Dolores (1930–2020). They had immigrated from Mexico to California in the 1950s. The couple had 13 children, and Roberto Robledo often worked two or three jobs to support the family.

In the early 1960s, Roberto Robledo purchased a tortilla maker for $30. He also acquired two adjacent houses in San Ysidro, San Diego, near the Mexican border. One of the houses was used for the Robledo family, while the other was converted into a tortilleria, opened in 1964. The family began making tortillas and selling them to the public. They subsequently expanded their service, delivering tortillas to restaurants in San Diego. They also delivered to agents of the United States Border Patrol who worked at an immigrant holding facility in the area. The idea to open a quick-service Mexican restaurant came after agents asked Dolores Robledo if she could provide rice and beans with the tortillas.

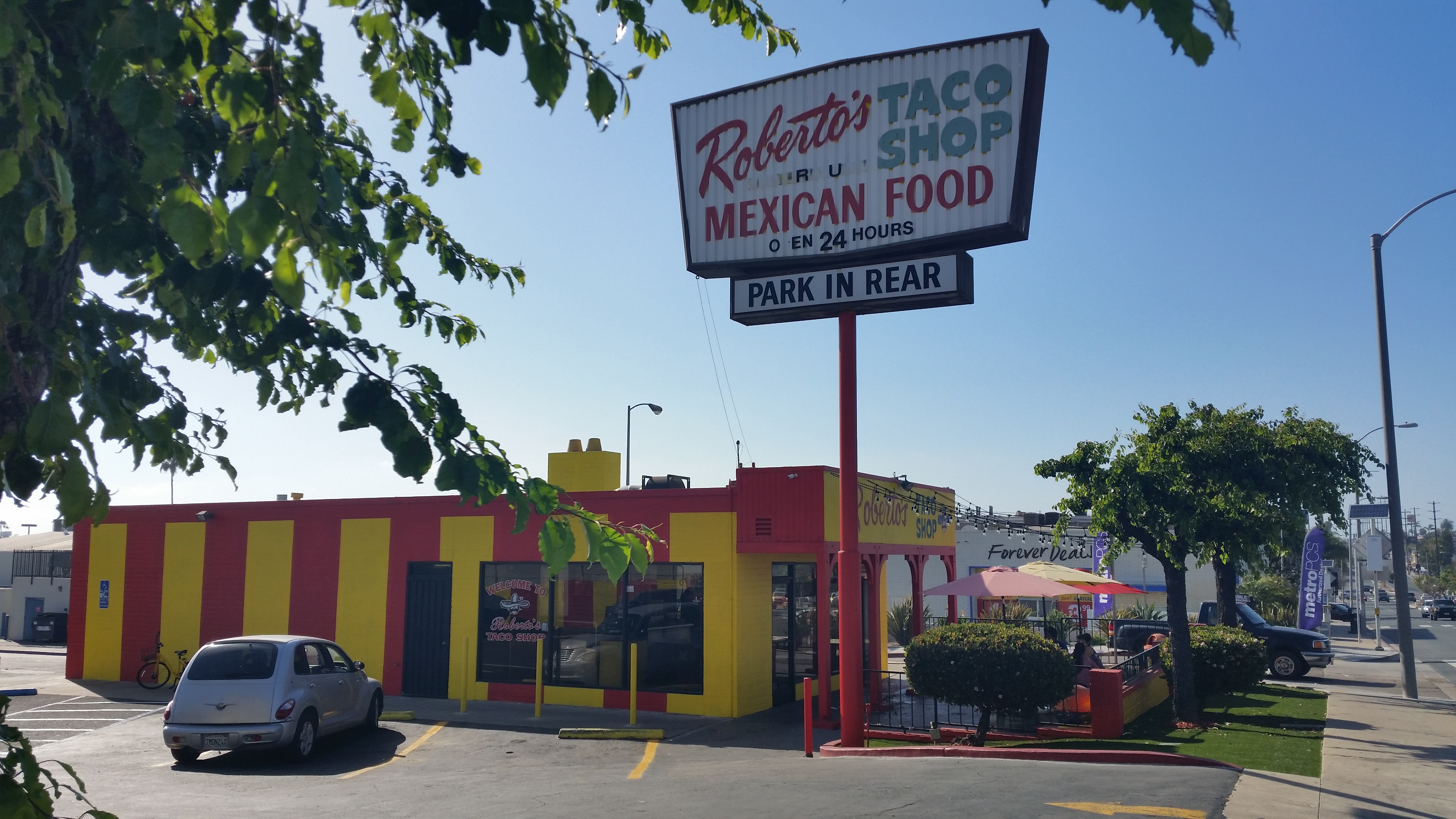
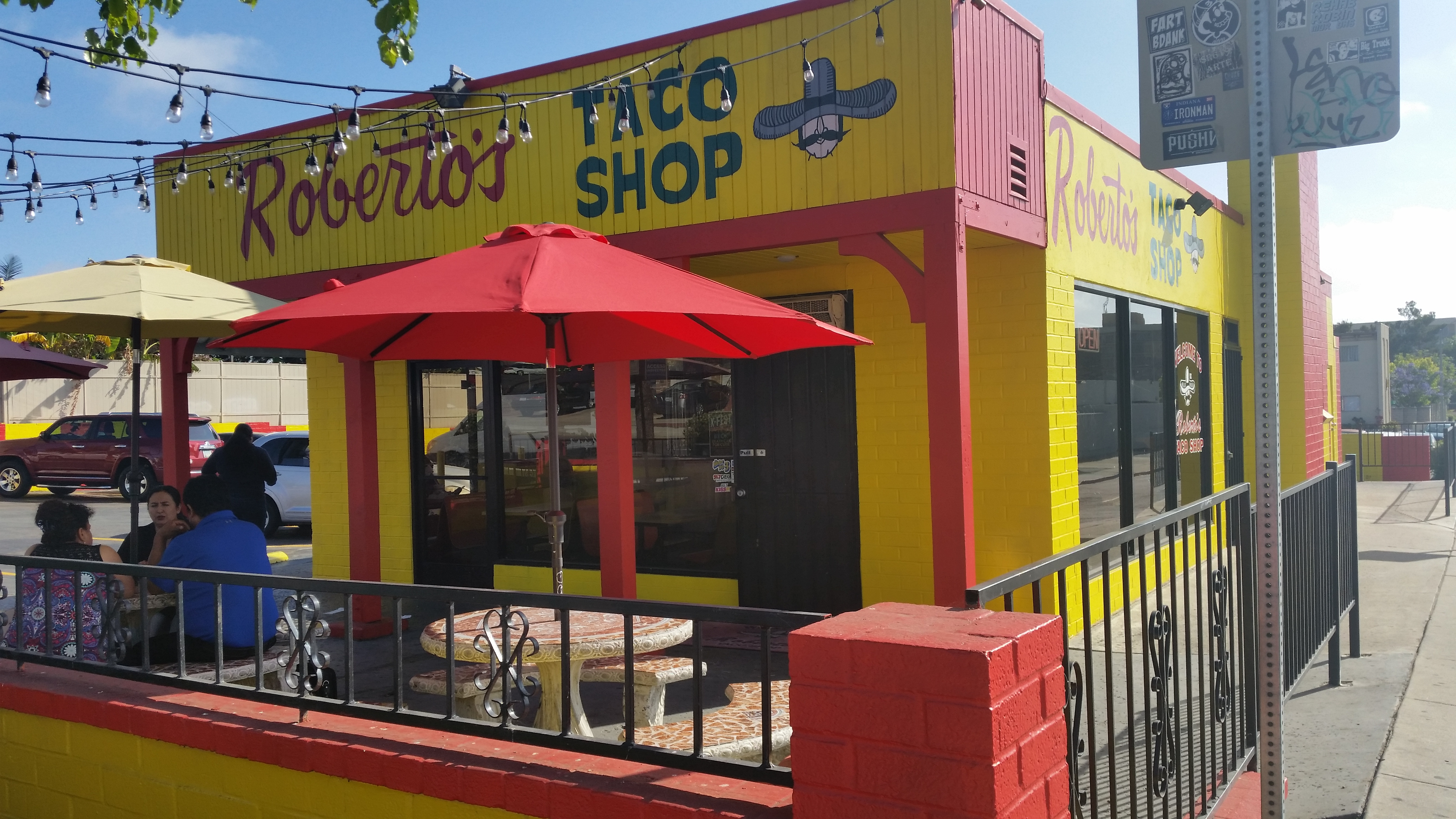
The first Roberto's restaurant, located in National City, California (2018)

The family purchased four restaurants during the 1960s, but retained the existing names. Roberto Robledo's first restaurant, La Lomita, was purchased in the late 1960s, and it used his wife's recipes. Each of the newly acquired restaurants served Mexican food. Around 1970, the Robledos purchased a fifth restaurant known as Jesse's, which had previously sold hamburgers. At the suggestion of Dolores, the five restaurants were renamed Roberto's Taco Shop, after her husband. Roberto's became one of the first taco chains in the United States. The Robledos' older children helped run the business and they each took over a restaurant in later years. The business is family owned, and franchises are usually not sold to the public.

During the mid-1970s, Roberto Robledo rented one of his taco shops to his cousins. A dispute occurred when the cousins did not prepare fresh batches of rice and beans on a daily basis as Robledo had wanted. In response, the cousins changed the name of their restaurant to Alberto's, which started a series of spin-off restaurants in the southwestern United States that use some variation of the "berto" name. More relatives and friends immigrated to the United States from the Robledos' home state of San Luis Potosí, and they continued to branch out with their own restaurant variations of the "berto" name.

Roberto's Taco Shop became successful starting in the mid-1970s, becoming a well known chain in San Diego. Roberto and Dolores Robledo split up in 1979, but remained friends and business partners. Roberto Robledo moved to the Las Vegas Valley in 1990 and opened the first of numerous Roberto's locations in the area that year. Like in San Diego, Roberto's also became a popular chain in the Las Vegas area.

The chain also expanded to Miami. In May 1999, a location opened in the Miami-area city of Hialeah, Florida. Roberto Robledo died a month later. At the time, Roberto's had 60 locations, including 30 in San Diego County and 30 in Nevada and Miami. In 2007, the chain expanded to several California communities, including Encinitas, Leucadia, Mission Valley, and Solana Beach. The Miami locations closed in 2009, as they were considered too far out to manage. In 2011, Roberto's had plans to expand into Orange and Imperial County in California. As of 2014, there were 48 Roberto's locations in and near Las Vegas, including a location in Mesquite, Nevada. In 2016, Roberto's opened its first northern Nevada location, in Reno. The Robledo family had first considered a Reno location five years earlier, after getting frequent emails from customers requesting a location there.

Dolores Robledo died in July 2020, after a brief illness. At the time, the chain had 77 locations, with more than 50 in southern Nevada. In August 2020, Roberto's opened a restaurant in Sparks, Nevada, marking its third location in northern Nevada. Within two years, the chain had also opened a location in Texas.

Various robberies have occurred at Roberto's locations, both in California and Nevada. Most locations operate 24 hours a day, every day of the year. In Las Vegas, the restaurants are especially popular among late-night partiers.

In April 2026, Reynaldo Robledo, CEO of Roberto's Taco Shop, triggered widespread public controversy and boycott calls after his support for Donald Trump, federal immigration enforcement, and the MAGA movement gained public attention. The backlash centered on the stark divide between his conservative political stance and the brand's identity as a Latino-founded business serving diverse communities.

== Products ==
Roberto's sells Mexican food items such as tacos, rice and beans. Popular items include taquitos and bean burritos, as well as carne asada fries and burritos. Roberto's is sometimes credited with introducing the California burrito, another popular item which is stuffed with French fries. The various burritos are known for their large size, and lard is a common ingredient in the restaurant's dishes.

Roberto's food has been praised. In 2003, the Miami New Times named Roberto's as the city's best 24-hour taco shop in its annual "Best of Miami" awards. Two years later, Roberto's won for best tacos in the Best of Miami awards. Roberto's was also praised by the Miami Herald and The Palm Beach Post, and was popular among readers of the North County Times in Escondido, California. Readers of the Las Vegas Review-Journal have named Roberto's for best tacos on several occasions, part of the newspaper's "Best of Las Vegas" awards. It won several categories in the 2016 Best of Las Vegas, including "Best Late Night Eats". Readers of Las Vegas Weekly named it the city's best taco shop on several non-consecutive occasions between 2017 and 2022. Guy Fieri has praised the chain's carne asada burrito.

== See also ==
- Filiberto's, a chain in Arizona opened by the husband of a Robledo cousin
