= Kiki's Mexican Restaurant =

Restaurant and Bar in El Paso, Texas

Coordinates: 31°48′04″N 106°27′42″W

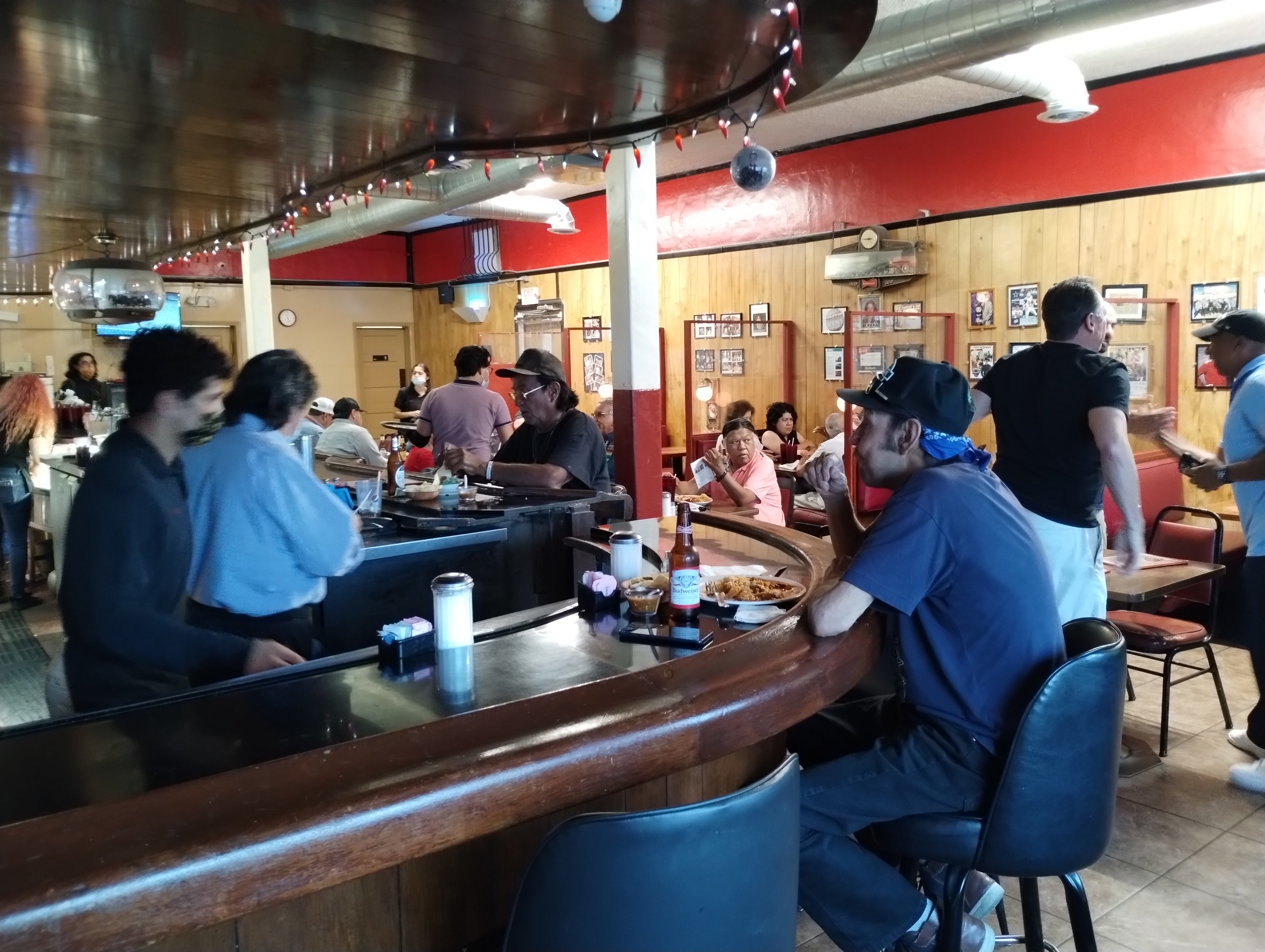
The bar and main room of Kiki's, September 2022.

Kiki's Mexican Restaurant and Bar is located in El Paso, Texas and serves Mexican food. The restaurant was founded in 1976 and is known for their machaca, enchiladas, and mole. Kiki's has made the national list of Hispanic's 50 Best Hispanic restaurants several years in a row and was featured on The Best Thing I Ever Ate.

== About ==
Kiki's is a Mexican restaurant serving lunch, and dinner in Central El Paso, Texas. Kiki's is well known for their enchiladas and mole. On Season 4, episode 1 of The Best Thing I Ever Ate, chef Aarón Sánchez praised the beef machaca served at Kiki's, and in 1995, the owner shared the recipe for this dish with the El Paso Times. Sarah Macias, member of the Texas Taco Council, rates Kiki's as one of top ten places to get a taco in El Paso.

The look of the restaurant hasn't changed since it opened. The building is adobe-style and located on the corner of Piedras Street. The front room of Kiki's features a large bar. The dining booths are covered in red vinyl and the tables are made of simulated wood. The walls are covered in wood paneling. Polaroid pictures of customers decorate the walls. In 1985, Texas Monthly described the atmosphere as Cheers-like.

Kiki's was named one of Hispanic Magazine's 50 Best Hispanic Restaurants every year from 1997 to 2002. In the first year Kiki's made the list, it was rated 39th nationally.

=== History ===
Kiki's Mexican Restaurant and Bar was founded by Paula Yardeni in 1976 and named after her daughter. Yardeni originally advertised her business through word of mouth. Hector Latigo, a former manager, bought the restaurant when Yardeni retired in 2011.

The adobe building was once a church and later, a grocery store. The building was previously a bar known as Pike's, and later was a German restaurant called the Keg & Fork.
