= Acapulco Mexican Restaurant and Cantina =

Restaurant in Pasadena, California

Coordinates: 34.15710°N 118.26389°W

- Type: Subsidiary
- Industry: Restaurants
- Founded: 1960; 66 years ago
- Number of employees: 236
- Parent: Xperience Restaurant Group
- Website: www.acapulcorestaurants.com

Acapulco Mexican Restaurant and Cantina is a restaurant chain founded in 1960 in Pasadena, California. They currently only have restaurants in California. The restaurant chain is owned by Xperience Restaurant Group which is headquartered in Cypress, California. There is currently only one remaining restaurant still open, located in Long Beach, California.

== History ==
In 1985, Restaurant Associates acquired Acapulco. When Compass Group acquired Restaurant Associates in 1998, Acapulco became owned by Bruckmann, Rosser, Sherrill & Co., a private equity firm that had an ownership stake in Restaurant Associates. Bruckmann, Rosser, Sherrill & Co. used Acapulco as the starting point of Real Mex Restaurants, acquiring such chains as El Torito and Chevys Fresh Mex. In 2006, Sun Capital Partners, Inc. purchased Real Mex Restaurants for $359 million from Bruckmann, Rosser, Sherrill & Co.

On October 4, 2011, Real Mex filed for Chapter 11 bankruptcy and announced that it was putting itself up for sale citing the poor economy as a reason. It was acquired by a group of its noteholders in a bankruptcy auction in 2012. In 2018, FM Restaurants HoldCo, LLC acquired Acapulco Mexican Restaurant and Cantina out of bankruptcy and begun operations under Xperience Restaurant Group.
