= Canby Asparagus Farm and Casa de Tamales =

Farm and restaurant in Milwaukie, Oregon, U.S.

Canby Asparagus Farm / Casa de Tamales

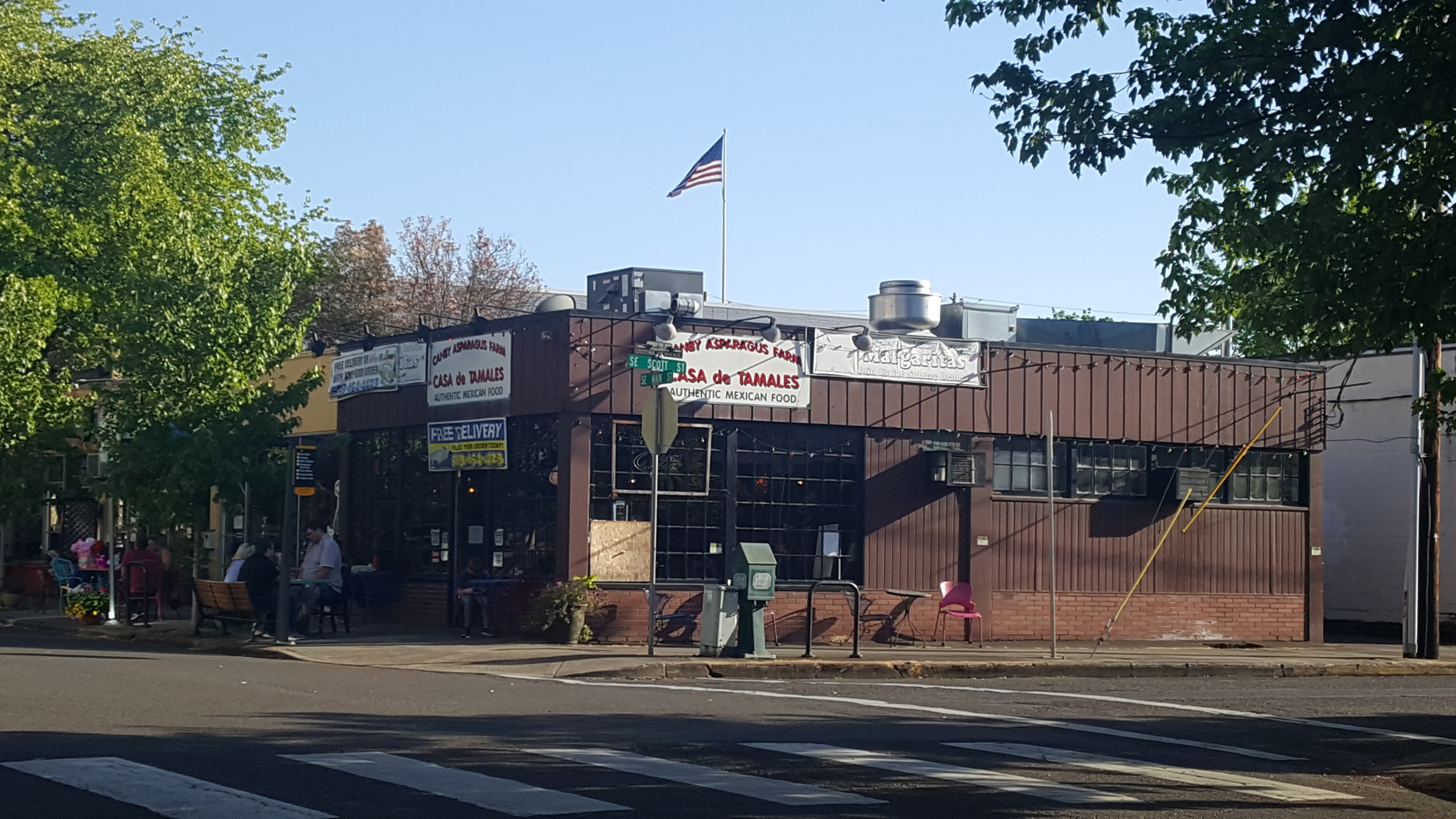
- The restaurant's exterior in 2021
- Interactive map of Canby Asparagus Farm / Casa de Tamales

Restaurant information
- Food type: Mexican
- Location: 10605 Southeast Main Street, Milwaukie, Oregon, United States
- Coordinates: 45.4460°N 122.6419°W
- Website: canbyasparagusfarmcasadetamal.com

Canby Asparagus Farm and Casa de Tamales (sometimes collectively referred to as Canby Asparagus Farm Casa de Tamales) are a farm operation and Mexican restaurant based in Milwaukie, Oregon, United States.

== Description ==
Located at 10605 Southeast Main Street, the restaurant's menu features Mexican cuisine including as burritos, chile rellenos, enchiladas, quesadillas, tacos, and tamales. The brunch buffet also features bacon, eggs, and Mexican-style potatoes. In 2012, Willamette Week staff said the restaurant's interior had "walls packed with gewgaws including a marlin, framed Elvis posters and Pee-wee Herman riding a lion". New seasonal entrees were unveiled in late 2020.

== History ==
Canby Asparagus Farm has been owned by Charles Maes and family since 1991. The business has staffed booths at the Milwaukie Farmers Market and others in the region. Maes' son Brandon opened Casa de Tamales in November 2007.

In 2018, a 10-foot tall, 400-pound boot sculpture displayed on the building's exterior for decades was stolen. Like many other restaurants, Casa de Tamales operated at limited capacities during the COVID-19 pandemic. Maes spoke out against some of the restrictions.

== Reception ==
The Oregonian's Douglas Perry wrote in 2009, "By far, the best-tasting masa in town is at Canby Asparagus Farm's Casa de Tamales." In 2012, Willamette Week staff said Casa de Tamales had the Portland metropolitan area's best tamales. Brooke Jackson-Glidden included the business in Eater Portland's 2022 list of "Where to Find Tasty Tamales in Portland and Beyond" and wrote, "When it comes to sheer variety of tamales, it is extremely difficult to beat this Milwaukie tamale shop." Krista Garcia included the business in Portland Monthly's 2025 overview of the best tamales in the metropolitan area.

== See also ==
- List of Mexican restaurants
