= República (restaurant) =

Restaurant in Portland, Oregon, U.S.

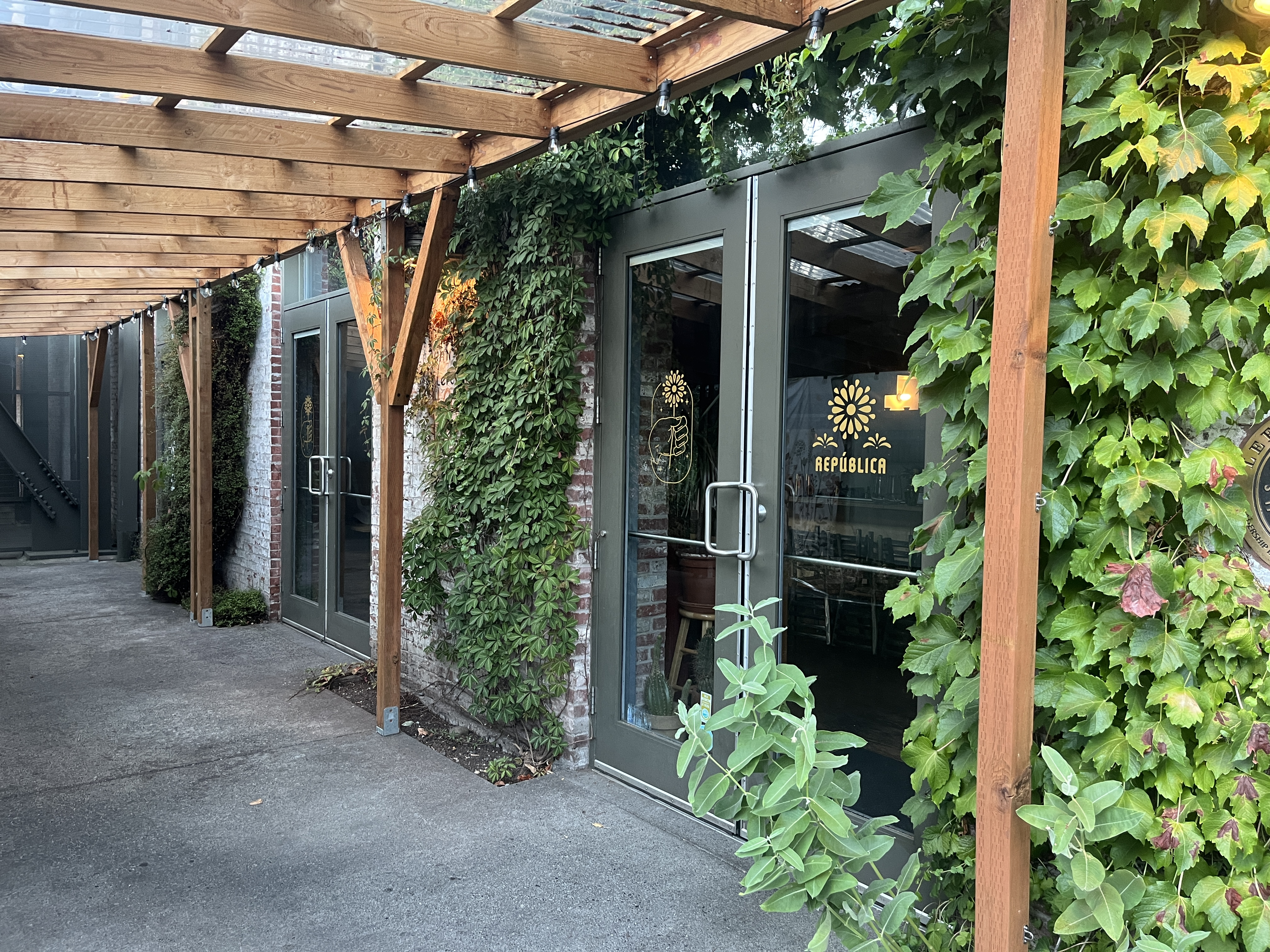
- The restaurant's exterior, 2022
- Interactive map of República

Restaurant information
- Established: November 2020
- Chef: Dani Morales
- Food type: Mexican; Pre-Columbian
- Location: 721 Northwest 9th Avenue #175, Portland, Multnomah, Oregon, 97209, United States
- Coordinates: 45.5282°N 122.6805°W
- Website: republicapdx.square.site

República is a restaurant in Portland, Oregon's Pearl District, in the United States. Established in 2020, the restaurant was slated to close permanently in February 2026, but announced plans to continue daytime service in March 2026.

== History ==
The restaurant opened in November 2020.

In 2023, Jose Camarena was one of 18 Portland chefs deemed "rising stars" by the restaurant industry resource and trade publication StarChefs.

In 2025, Dani Morales was named chef and the menu format was reduced from ten courses to seven. The business has announced plans to close permanently in February 2026. The closing date was pushed back to March 7, 2026.

== Reception ==
Kara Stokes and Maya MacEvoy included República in Eater Portland's 2022 overview of "Where to Eat and Drink in Portland’s Pearl District". The website included the business in a similar list in 2025. República was included in The Infatuation's 2024 list of Portland's best restaurants. The business was included in Portland Monthly's 2025 list of 25 restaurants "that made Portland".

== See also ==
- Hispanics and Latinos in Portland, Oregon
- List of Mexican restaurants
