= Margaritas (restaurant) =

American restaurant chain

- Industry: Restaurants
- Area served: United States
- Website: www.margs.com

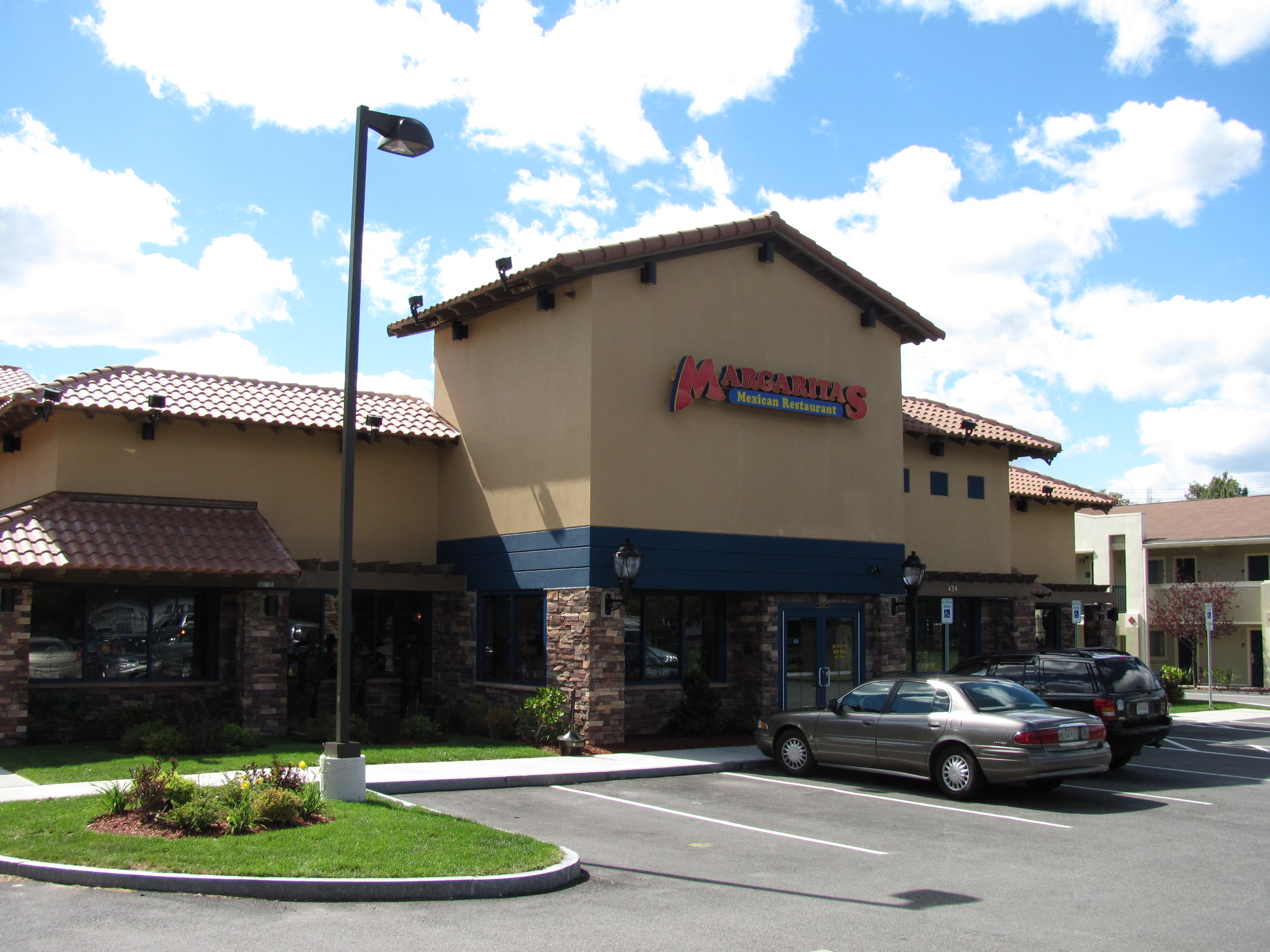
A Margaritas restaurant in Lexington, Massachusetts.

Margaritas is a Mexican restaurant chain in New England. Founded by John Pelletier in 1985 in Concord, NH. His first venture opened as Tio Juan's. With partner Stan Bagley, he opened the first Tio Juan's Mexican Restaurant in Orono, ME. Shortly after, his brother Dave joined the venture. Since then, the company has grown to 18 corporate locations across New England, and new franchise stores opening in the Mid Atlantic, like locations in Tom's River, NJ and Lansdale, PA. The company is the most prominent TexMex casual dining experience in New England. Margaritas are decorated with art and furniture directly from central Mexico.
