= Tio's Tacos =

Restaurant in California

- Location within the Los Angeles metropolitan area Location within California Location within the United States

Restaurant information
- Established: 1990
- Owners: Estefany "Stephanie" Sanchez; Kimberly Sanchez
- Food type: Mexican
- Location: 3948 Mission Inn Avenue, Riverside, CA 92501
- Coordinates: 33.9841°N 117.3769°W
- Website: www.tiostacos1.com

Tio's Tacos is a Mexican restaurant in Riverside, California. It is known for its many instances of folk art made from discarded items around its grounds.

== History ==
The restaurant was founded in 1990 by Martín Sanchez, who moved from Sahuayo in Michoacán to California in 1984, and his wife Conception. It is currently run by two of their daughters, Estefany and Kimberly. He originally sold oranges on the street and saw many people throw out still usable items. Sanchez saw this and thought he could repair them as he had come from a place with much poverty. He started creating his art in 1995. In 2000, the city approved Sanchez's purchase of a lot that was to be used for both commercial and residential use, functioning as a new location for the restaurant and the family's home. The first major project, two large figures near the front, was created in 2005, with the help of Sanchez's "right-hand man", Ignacio "Nacho" Martinez. During the COVID-19 pandemic the interior of the restaurant was closed, but it still served food, seating customers at the patio areas.

== Menu ==
The restaurant serves tacos, chile rellenos, mole enchiladas, burritos, sopes, flautas, carne asada, fajitas, tostadas, taco salad, chicken nuggets, quesadillas, french fries, rice and beans, nachos, and tortas. One of the most popular menu items is a fried tilapia, topped with a signature garlic and lemon sauce.

== Artworks ==
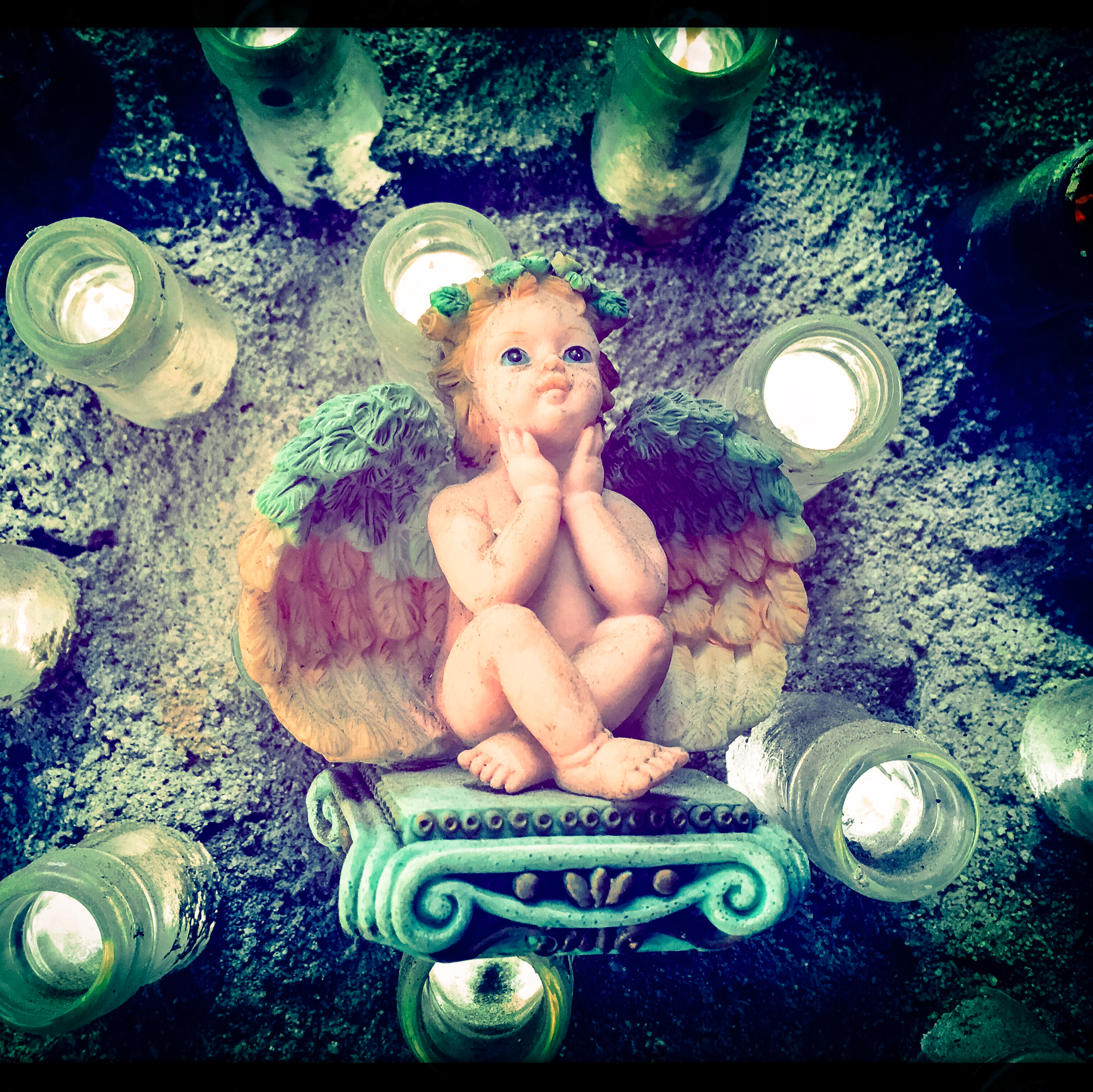
An example of an art piece at the restaurant

Most of the space available was used to display the art. Many old items used by the Sanchez family in their daily lives were incorporated into the displays, such as a bicycle in cement. One of the larger works is a chapel that is composed almost only of empty beer bottles. Inside, there is a painted ceiling similar to the Sistine Chapel and multicolored pews. City officials originally considered the art to be trash and an eyesore, and had to spend three years in court against the city.
