= Taco Mayo =

Restaurant chain

Taco Mayo Inc.
- Current Taco Mayo Logo
- Type: Privately held company
- Industry: Restaurant
- Genre: Fast food
- Founded: May 21, 1978; 48 years ago Norman, Oklahoma
- Headquarters: Oklahoma City, Oklahoma, U.S.
- Number of locations: 39 (2023)
- Products: Tacos; burritos; Fresh Mex
- Website: www.tacomayo.com

Taco Mayo Restaurant is an American fast food chain which specializes in Mexican-style food. The company was founded in Norman, Oklahoma, and is currently headquartered in Oklahoma City, Oklahoma. Taco Mayo has franchise locations throughout Oklahoma, northern Texas, southern Kansas, and western Arkansas.

== History ==
The chain originated in Norman, Oklahoma in May 1978, and by 1980, Taco Mayo had expanded into franchising by establishing three stores in the Oklahoma City metropolitan area. Over the years, Taco Mayo has expanded from a single store in Norman into a regional operation with 53 Taco Mayo locations throughout Oklahoma and its surrounding areas. The restaurant wanted to expand to 200 locations by the year 2000. While it did not reach that goal, it had reached its 100th location by 1997. After the “expansion program” failed, the company began realizing its marketing mistake: never force quantity over quality. Many of the restaurants were built and opened in such a rush that the company did not care about finding the right individuals to run the restaurant or finding the right locations to place the restaurants. Not wanting to be the fast-food chain that everyone stereotyped as poorly crafted or run-down, Taco Mayo's corporate offices closed down many of the locations that were functioning poorly.

=== Fresh Mex ===
Also contributing to saving the franchise's name was the idea to upgrade to a “Fresh Mex” style on the restaurant's 25th anniversary. This upgrade included simplifying the menu and showing the customer the freshness of their food by using an open layout bar that displayed the ingredients in plain sight.
