= Rio Bravo Cantina =

Tex-Mex Mexican restaurant chain

- Type: Subsidiary
- Industry: Tex-Mex restaurant
- Founded: 1985; 41 years ago in Atlanta, Georgia
- Founder: Ray Schoenbaum
- Defunct: 2002; 24 years ago
- Fate: Converted to Chevys Fresh Mex
- Headquarters: Atlanta, Georgia, U.S.
- Area served: Eastern United States
- Parent: Chevys Fresh Mex (1999–2002)
- Website: Archive of website from 2001

Rio Bravo Cantina was a Tex-Mex style Mexican restaurant serving the southern United States and Michigan from its opening in 1985 until its closure in 2004. The company relaunched in August 2015, only to close again 18 months later.

The Rio Bravo concept began in Atlanta, Georgia, United States, the first restaurant opening in the Buckhead section of Atlanta in May 1985. The concept was created by Ray Schoenbaum in conjunction with Innovative Restaurant Concepts Inc (or IRC).

In 1994, Applebee's purchased Innovative Restaurant Concepts for $66 million in stock and debt. At the time of the purchase, Innovative had 11 Rio Bravo Cantinas and 4 other restaurants.

On February 11, 1999, Applebee's sold the Rio Bravo concept to Chevys Fresh Mex for $53 million in cash, plus $6 million in assumed debt. After Chevy's purchase the menus between both chains were merged for supply and marketing purposes. Rio Bravo was famous for their cheese dip and salsa. Both of these were changed after the purchase. The drastic across the board changes in the menu contributed to the decline of the chain. In December 2002 Chevy's converted or closed all Rio Bravo restaurants.

On November 6, 2014, Ray Schoenbaum confirmed that the Rio Bravo concept was set to return to the Atlanta metropolitan area in 2015.

On February 15, 2017, Ray's Rio Bravo permanently closed.

== Locations ==
Besides suburban Atlanta, the chain also operated locations in Ann Arbor, Michigan; Dearborn, Michigan. Lansing, Michigan; Livonia, Michigan; Taylor, Michigan; Orlando, Florida; Tallahassee, Florida; Tampa, Florida; Asheville, North Carolina; Charlotte, North Carolina; Nashville, Tennessee, Strongsville, Ohio and Murfreesboro, Tennessee. Rio Bravo Mexican Grill in Hendersonville, Tennessee is a family-owned business that was not part of the official chain.
