= Hispanic (magazine) =

- Cover with Paz Vega
- Editor: Daniel Eilemberg
- Categories: Culture
- Frequency: Monthly 10 x year
- Total circulation: 300,000 (2007)
- Founded: 1988; 38 years ago
- Final issue: 2010
- Company: ET Publishing International
- Country: United States
- Based in: Virginia Gardens, Florida
- Language: English
- Website: https://hispaniconline.com/

Hispanic was an American English-language magazine of pop culture, fashion, and politics, published by Televisa Publishing. In 2008, it was the largest English language lifestyle magazine in the U.S. Hispanic market. The magazine was closed in 2010.

== History ==
Founded in 1988, Hispanic had an ABC-audited circulation of 315,000, reaching mobile Hispanic professionals, corporate executives, entrepreneurs, opinion leaders, members of Hispanic organizations, and students. Hispanic's editorial focus was on lifestyle, culture, entertainment, business, career and politics, with upbeat, informative and timely stories.

=== Contents ===
The editorial breakdown of the magazine as of 2007 was 35% lifestyle, 25% entertainment, 15% culture, 15% general interest, 5% business, 3% calendar and 2% career. The pages of Hispanic consistently featured the most prominent Hispanic artists in the U.S. and beyond: such as Antonio Banderas, Andy García, Ricky Martin, Penélope Cruz, Christina Aguilera, Diego Luna and Juanes.

== See also ==
- People en Español
