= Sausalitos =

German fusion cuisine restaurant chain

Sausalitos Holding GmbH
- Company type: Private
- Industry: Casual dining Chain restaurant
- Genre: Tex-Mex
- Founded: 1994; 31 years ago
- Founder: Gunilla und Thomas Hirschberger
- Headquarters: Munich, Germany
- Key people: Anton Dürrbeck; Michael Werner
- Revenue: 50 million EUR (2016)
- Number of employees: 1,223
- Website: sausalitos.de

Sausalitos is a German restaurant chain serving fusion cuisine influenced by californian cuisine and mexican cuisine. As of March 2025, there are 43 locations in operation in 33 cities in Germany.

== History ==
Sausalitos was founded by Gunilla und Thomas Hirschberger. The name Sausalitos was inspired by the city Sausalito in California.

In 2014 the founders of Sausalitos sold the company to a private equity investment company called Ergon Capital (now named Apheon). At the beginning of 2017, there were 37 locations in Germany. Two years later, this number grew to 43 with goals to expand further to all cities in Germany with more than 100,000 residents. As a result of financial decline which had begun during the COVID-19 pandemic, Anton Dürrbeck and Michael Werner filed for insolvency for several of the companies belonging to their group; Michael Schuster from the Munich law firm Jaffé Rechtsanwälte Insolvenzverwalter was appointed provisional insolvency administrator. Schuster has said the current course of action is to keep the restaurants operational while searching for new investors.

== Concept ==
Sausalitos locations are composed of four areas: a bar, a bistro, a restaurant, and a terrace. The branding and design of the restaurant comprises themes of leisure and a Californian lifestyle. Sausalitos also has an app that allows for digital ordering, among other functions. The menu features items such as burritos, fajitas, quesadillas, various burgers, and tapas. The majority of the cocktails are or bear similarities to tiki drinks.
