= Cantina Mariachi =

Restaurant chain

Cantina Mariachi is a chain of franchised casual restaurants with a Mexican-style theme. It belongs to the Comess Group.

== Chronology ==
=== 1993 ===
- Berdejo family opens first restaurant in Zaragoza, Spain

=== 1999 ===
- In June, start of international expansion with opening in Lisbon, Portugal
- As new units are launched, corporate umbrella is formed named Restmon

=== 2002 ===
- Restmon faces serious financial problems and looks for a buyer.
- In October, an association of franchisees sues Restmon for disloyal competition and misapplication of co-op marketing funds, among other allegations.

=== 2003 ===
- In August, the chain was sold to newly formed company Comess, headed by Manuel Robledo and Luis Irisarri.

=== 2004 ===
- In June, new restaurant decoration unveiled
- In July, court rules in favor of Comess regarding the October 2002 lawsuit

=== 2005 ===
- By July, 122 restaurants in total

=== 2006 ===
- By April, 104 restaurants in Spain and 15 in other countries (total 119)
