= Filiberto's =

American Mexican food restaurant chain

- Founded: 1993; 32 years ago, in Phoenix, Arizona
- Headquarters: United States
- Number of locations: 70+
- Area served: Southwest United States
- Products: Mexican food
- Website: https://www.Filibertos.com/

Filiberto's is an American restaurant chain that serves Mexican food in the American southwest. It has 70 locations in the state of Arizona. There are also locations in Southern California and New Mexico.

== History ==
In 1964, a restaurant named "Roberto's Taco Shop" was opened by Roberto Robledo (1928–1999) and wife Dolores (1930-2020), a pair of immigrants from San Juan del Salado in San Luis Potosi, Mexico-in San Diego, California.

Roberto's was so popular that it began the era of the spawning of several competitors which bore a similar name, usually ending with the suffix "berto's" on them. Eventually, the Robledo family decided to expand the concept, under the new name "Alberto's".

The Tenorio family of San Luis Potosi lived two ranches next to the Robledo family. One of the Tenorio family members married a Robledo cousin and, in 1993, decided to open the first Filiberto's in Arizona. Since then, Filiberto's has become the most prominent of the -berto's restaurant companies in Arizona.
