= California Tortilla =

Fast casual Mexican-style restaurant chain

California Tortilla Group, Inc.

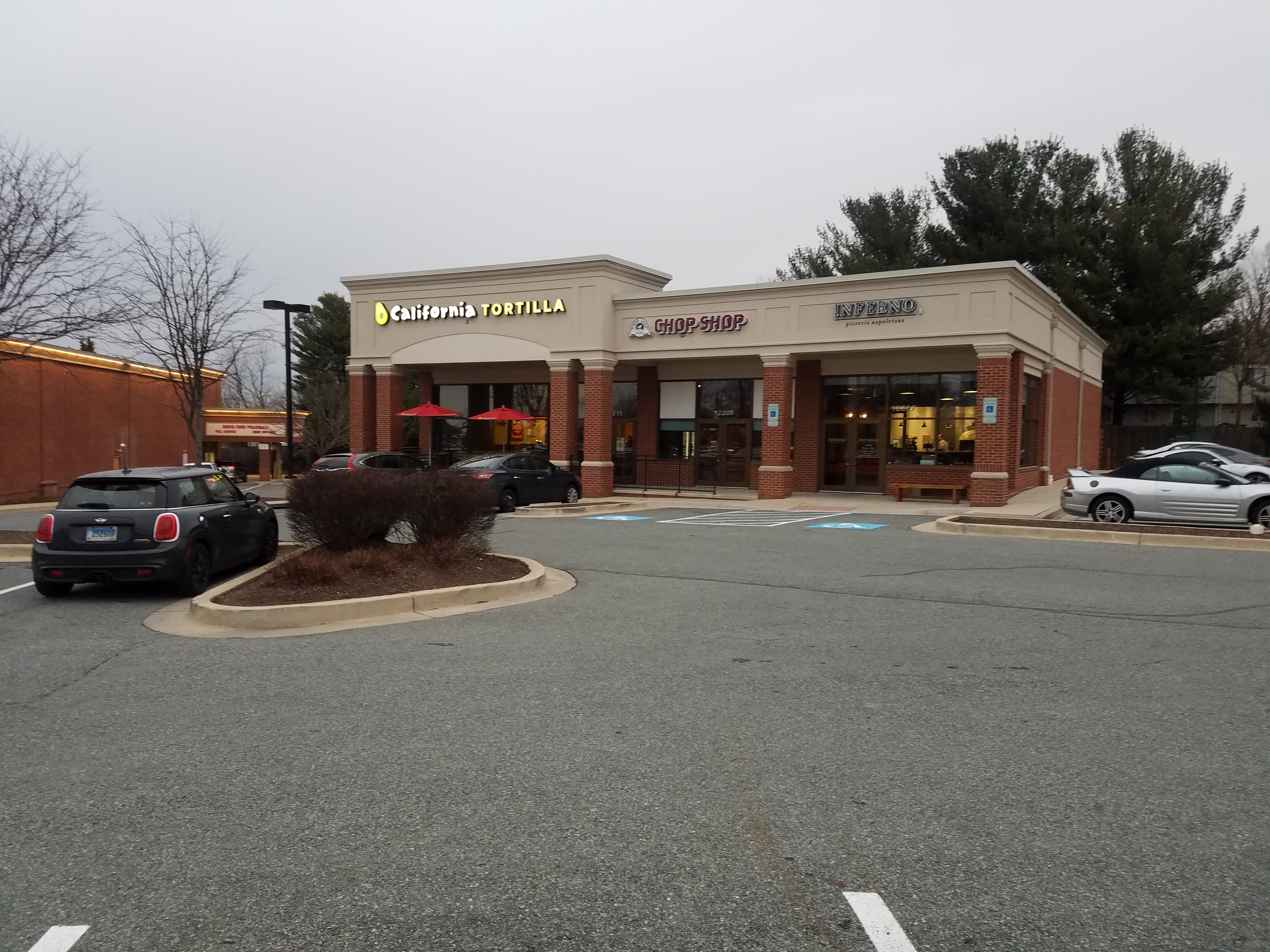
- A former California Tortilla in Montgomery County, Maryland.
- Trade name: California Tortilla
- Type: Private
- Industry: Restaurant Franchising
- Genre: Fast casual
- Founded: August 4, 1995; 31 years ago Bethesda, Maryland, U.S.
- Founders: Pam Felix; Alan Cohen
- Headquarters: Potomac, Maryland, U.S.
- Number of locations: 39 in U.S. As of 2020; franchised since 2003
- Area served: Washington metropolitan area; Philadelphia metropolitan area; North Jersey; South Carolina; South Hampton Roads (VA)
- Key people: Jennifer Rorie (CEO); Aaron Goldberg (Director); Sara Mahaffey (Director of marketing)
- Products: Mexican-style food such as Burritos, salads, etc.
- Services: Catering
- Revenue: US$99.627 million (2021)
- Number of employees: 654 (2021)
- Website: californiatortilla.com

California Tortilla, also known as Cal Tort, is an American chain of franchised fast casual Mexican-style restaurants, the first of which was opened in August 1995 in Bethesda, Maryland by business partners Pam Felix and Alan Cohen. The chain's menu is comparable to that of its competitors, such as Baja Fresh and Chipotle Mexican Grill. A typical restaurant has 2,500 square feet (230 m^{2}) with seating for 75 people. California Tortilla was voted by readers of Washingtonian magazine as having the best burritos in both 2009 and 2010, and "best Mexican" in 2014 and 2015. In 2019, it was awarded Best Fast Casual by Washington City Paper readers.
