= Surf Taco =

Restaurant Chain

- Company type: Tacos, Burritos
- Genre: "Coastal Cuisine"
- Founded: 2001; 25 years ago
- Headquarters: Point Pleasant Beach, New Jersey, USA
- Products: Tacos, Burritos, Nachos, Taco Salads, Fish Tacos
- Website: www.surftaco.com

Surf Taco is a chain of Mexican-Californian cuisine-style restaurants located primarily in the Jersey Shore area. The food served is also described as Coastal Cuisine. It was founded by Robert Nagel, in 2001. There are presently fourteen restaurants.

Main categories of food include: tacos, burritos, wraps, smoothies, salads, quesadillas, and side kicks (extra chips and salsa, chicken fingers, etc).

In 2009, the New York Times called the food "cross-generationally irresistible."

Surf Taco distributed bumper stickers advertising the restaurant. Because the bumper stickers were frequently posted on public property, the then Mayor of Belmar, Ken Pringle was quoted in The Washington Times stating that he had considered passing a law holding the distributors responsible for removing the stickers.
