= Chevys Fresh Mex =

American restaurant chain

Chevys Inc.
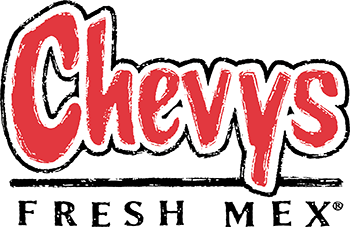
- Type: Subsidiary
- Industry: Casual dining restaurant
- Founded: 1981; 45 years ago, in Alameda, California, U.S.
- Founder: Warren Simmons
- Headquarters: Cypress, California, U.S.
- Key people: Randy Sharpe (president & CEO); Mike Johnson (COO); Ned Algeo (CFO)
- Products: Mexican-style cuisine
- Number of employees: 1,000 (2022)
- Parent: Xperience Restaurant Group
- Website: www.chevys.com

Chevys Fresh Mex is an American chain of Mexican-style casual dining restaurants located in the United States. The chain was founded in 1986 by Warren Simmons in Alameda, California. The chain's headquarters are currently located in Cypress, California. The chain is owned by Xperience Restaurant Group.

== History ==
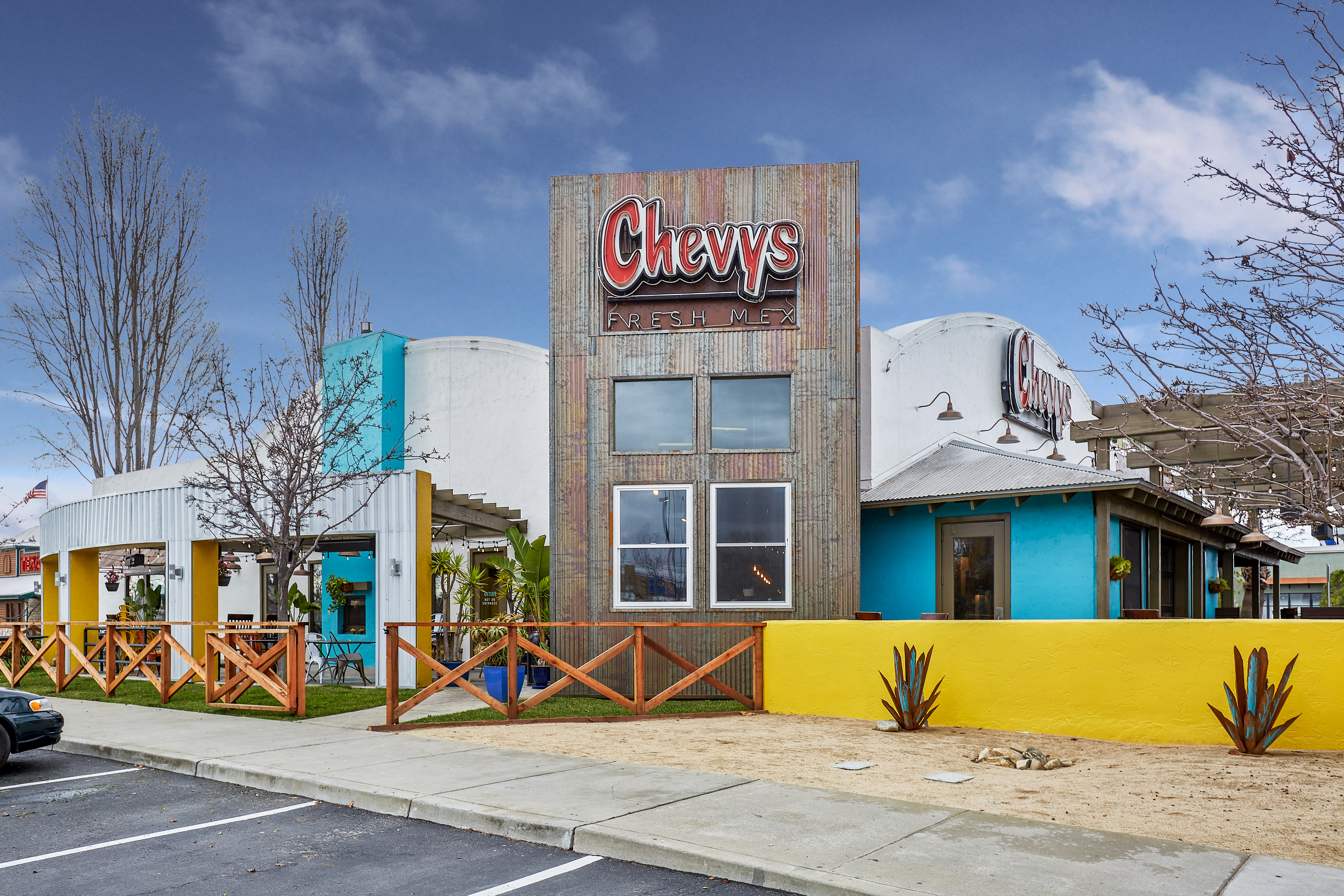
A Chevys Fresh Mex restaurant in January 2020.

The chain was founded in 1981 by Warren Simmons, with his first restaurant in Alameda, California. It grew to 37 restaurants across California by August 1993, when it was acquired by PepsiCo subsidiary Taco Bell. It acquired the six-restaurant La Casa Real chain from VIP's in 1994. When PepsiCo exited the restaurant business in 1997, Chevys was sold to the investment group J.W. Childs Associates. In 1999, Chevys purchased Rio Bravo Cantina, a poorly-performing chain of Tex-Mex restaurants with 66 locations across the United States, from Applebee's International for $59 million.

Business was poor at the Rio Bravo locations, and in 2003 Chevys' executives filed for Chapter 11 bankruptcy protection. For the next year and a half, Chevys operated as debtor in possession under Chapter Eleven. In January 2005, Chevys and Fuzio Universal Pasta were acquired by Real Mex Restaurants, Inc., the Long Beach, California-based parent company of El Torito Restaurants and Acapulco Mexican Restaurants. The acquisitions gave Real Mex Restaurants claim as the largest operator of full-service Mexican restaurants in the United States. Real Mex subsequently passed through bankruptcy in 2011–2012, and was acquired by Xperience Restaurant Group in 2018.

14 more underperforming Chevys Fresh Mex restaurants, mostly in northern California, were closed on December 26, 2016. Among these were the Redding, Chico, South Lake Tahoe, Modesto, and Fresno locations in California.

In 2021, Xperience Restaurant Group began the expansion of the Chevys Fresh Mex restaurants with a new location in Orlando, FL near the Mall at Millenia.

== Restaurants ==
As of 2026, are currently 7 Chevy's restaurants in California, all clustered around the San Francisco Bay Area, and 9 restaurants around the rest of the US. Many of these locations are owned by the company; however, some are franchisee-owned: a handful of restaurants in California, and the single Orlando, Florida location remained after the October 2018 bankruptcy and asset sale.
