= Cafe Rio =

American fast casual restaurant chain

Cafe Rio Mexican Grill
- Type: Restaurant
- Industry: Casual dining Restaurants
- Genre: Fast Casual
- Founded: 1997; 29 years ago
- Headquarters: Salt Lake City, Utah
- Number of locations: 162 (as of 2023)
- Website: www.caferio.com

Cafe Rio, or Cafe Rio Mexican Grill, is an American fast casual restaurant chain based in Salt Lake City, with branches in Arizona, California, Colorado, Idaho, Maryland, Montana, Nevada, Utah, Virginia, Washington, and Wyoming. The company specializes in Mexican cuisine. Its menu includes appetizers, tostadas, salads, burritos, desserts, enchiladas, tacos, quesadillas, soups, and beverages. The company also provides catering services. In October 2017, the chain had 120 locations. In April 2022, it has grown to 146 locations.

== History ==
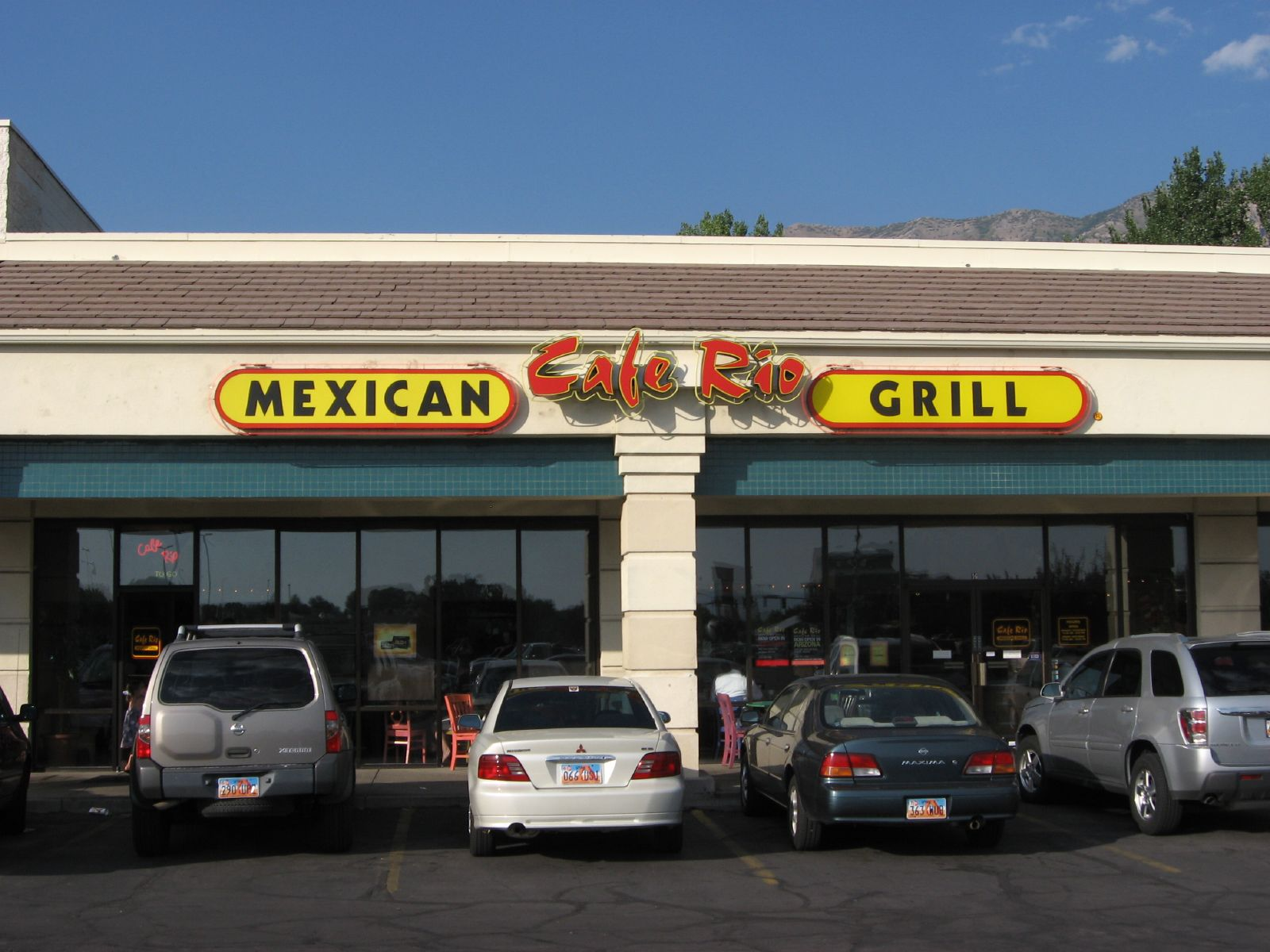
A Cafe Rio location in Provo, Utah

Cafe Rio was started in 1997 by Steve and Tricia Stanley in St. George, Utah. In December 2004, Bob and Kathleen Nilsen, Spencer K Hill, along with SKM/Apax Partners purchased the chain, which at the time had six restaurants. In 2011, Dave Gagnon took over as CEO and COO at the same time as Bob Baker was appointed President and CFO. In 2018, Steve Vaughan became CEO when Dave Gagnon retired. Previously, Mr. Vaughan was CFO, he was asked to resign early 2026. As of December 2020, Cafe Rio is operating in 135 locations across 11 states. Cafe Rio's recipes are inspired from the traditional cooking of the Rio Grande region of Northern Mexico, Southern Texas and New Mexico. Meals are cooked in each restaurant's kitchen, fresh every day. The signature dish is a sweet pork barbacoa burrito made enchilada-style. There are plans on opening 12 new locations in 2021 and converting current some existing locations to include drive-thru's.

=== Allegations against Costa Vida ===
In 2005, Cafe Rio allegedly accused fellow Utah-based, fast casual Mexican restaurant Costa Vida (formerly known as Costa Azul) of recipe theft and copying trade secrets. The two restaurants settled privately in 2007.

== Locations ==
The company has locations in:

- Arizona
- California
- Colorado
- Idaho
- Maryland
- Montana
- Nevada
- Utah
- Virginia
- Washington
- Wyoming
