= Real Mex Restaurants =

Company based in Orange County, California

- Industry: Restaurant / Mexican
- Founded: January 1, 1954; 72 years ago
- Founder: Larry Cano
- Defunct: October 27, 2018
- Headquarters: Cypress, California, United States
- Key people: Brian Lockwood (President, CEO)
- Website: www.realmexrestaurants.com

Real Mex Restaurants is the parent company for several chains of full-service Mexican restaurants in the United States. The company is headquartered in Cypress, California, and operates more than 120 full service Mexican restaurants under eight brand names.

== History ==
The company claims its origin to Larry Cano who, in 1954 with the opening of the first El Torito restaurant, which expanded into a chain. Another origin was the founding of Acapulco Mexican Restaurant and Cantina in 1960. In 1998, Acapulco became owned by the private equity firm Bruckmann, Rosser, Sherrill & Co., which expanded it into Real Mex Restaurants, acquiring El Torito, Chevy's Fresh Mex and other Mexican full-service chains. The company's reach is now nationwide, and the company claims to be the largest Mexican restaurant chain in the United States.

In October 2011, the company filed for Chapter 11 bankruptcy. In February 2012, it was sold to a group of debt holders. The company is now owned by an investment group that includes Z Capital Partners.

Real Mex Restaurants portfolio includes: El Torito, Acapulco Mexican Restaurant and Cantina, Chevy's Fresh Mex, El Paso Cantina, Who Song and Larry's and the Southern California landmark Las Brisas of Laguna Beach.
