= El Adobe de Capistrano =

Restaurant in San Juan Capistrano, California

Coordinates: 33.49975°N 117.66282°W

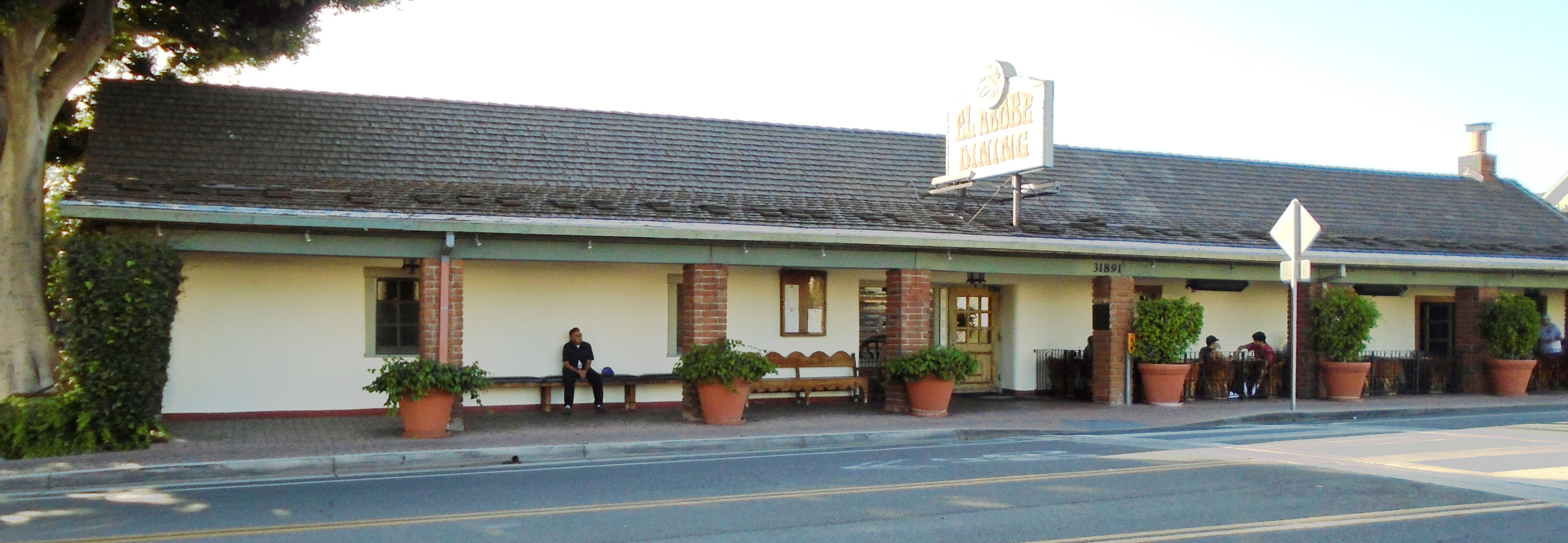
- (2019)
- Interactive map of El Adobe de Capistrano

Restaurant information
- Established: 1948; 78 years ago
- Owners: Richard O’Neill, Steve Nordeck, Tony Moiso, and Gilbert Aguirre
- Food type: Mexican
- Dress code: casual
- Location: 31891 Camino Capistrano, San Juan Capistrano, California, 92675, United States
- Reservations: (949) 493-1163
- Website: Official Website

El Adobe de Capistrano, or El Adobe, is a restaurant located in at 31891 Camino Capistrano in San Juan Capistrano, California. It has been operated since 1948 and is in a building composed of two historic adobes near Mission San Juan Capistrano. It is also notable for being frequented by and being a favorite of U.S. President Richard Nixon who lived in nearby San Clemente. Now El Adobe is a California historical landmark.

== History ==
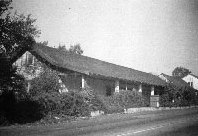
The building in 1910.

The adobe which comprises the northern portion of the restaurant was built as the home of Miguel Yorba in 1797. The southern portion, from 1812, was the Juzgado (court and jails) and also served at different times as a post office, store, and stage depot. The Juzgado's jail cell now serves as the restaurant's wine cellar and is rumored to harbor a ghost. In addition, there have been reports of a headless friar in front of the restaurant.

In 1910, Harry and Georgia Mott Vander Leck bought the two properties, combining them together and adding sunken wings to both buildings, for use as their home and store.

In 1946, Clarence Brown bought the property, and established the El Adobe restaurant, opening it on July 8, 1948, for the wedding and reception of the First Commandant of Camp Pendleton Marine Corps Base, General Fegan. The restaurant was bought by the Fred Harvey Company in 1955.

While in office, former President Richard Nixon whose nearby San Clemente home was known as the Western White House, visited the restaurant many times. The restaurant was originally continental cuisine, but after comments by Nixon, it gained attention for its Mexican fare and changed the menu. The restaurant serves Nixon’s usual meal and one table is decorated with pictures of him, supposedly him and his wife’s favorite seat.
