= El Taco Tote =

Restaurant chain

El Taco Tote Real Mexican Grill
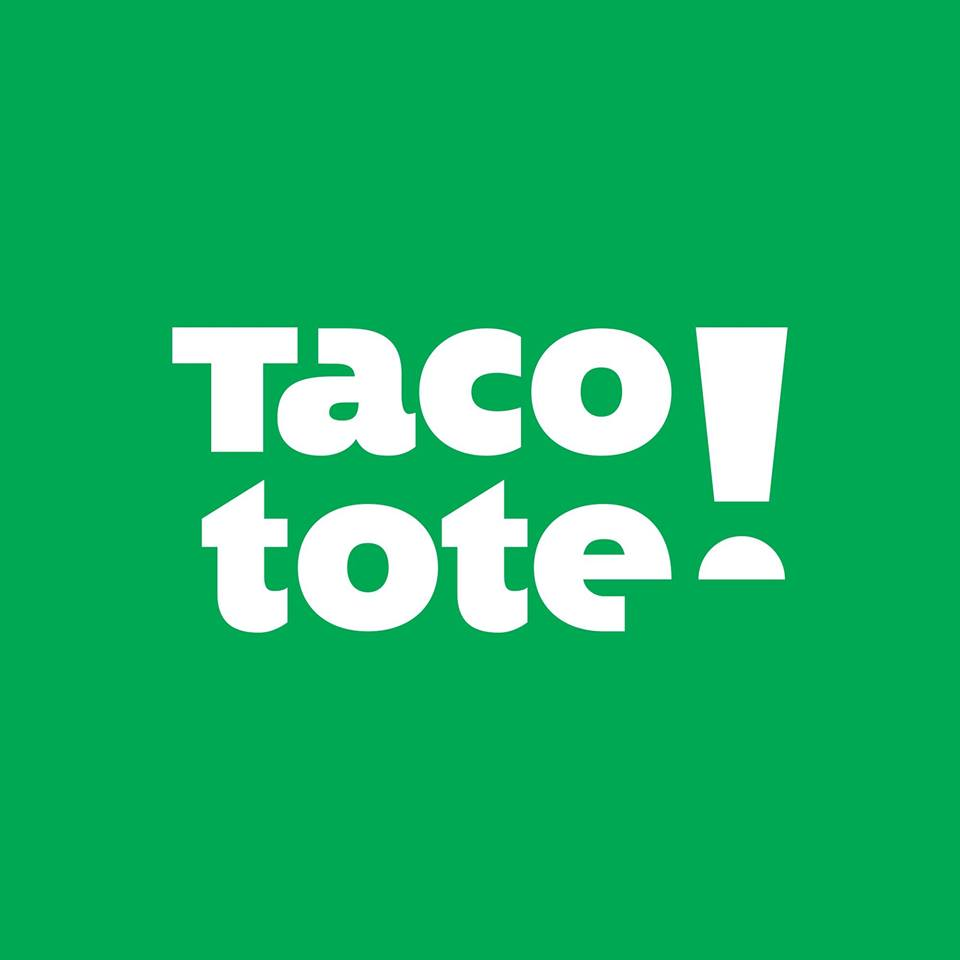
- Logo
- Company type: Mexican Restaurants
- Industry: Quick Service Restaurants
- Genre: Fast Casual
- Founded: 1988; 38 years ago
- Founder: Jose Pacifico Heras (CEO)
- Headquarters: El Paso, Texas; United States
- Number of locations: 23 company-owned restaurants
- Area served: Arizona, New Mexico, Texas, Mexico
- Products: Mexican Food
- Services: Catering
- Owner: Jose Pacifico Heras (CEO)
- Website: tacotote.com

El Taco Tote Real Mexican Grill is an originally Mexico-based, United States fast-food restaurant chain specializing in real Mexican cuisine. Currently headquartered in El Paso, Texas, the first location was created in Cd. Juarez, Chihuahua in 1988. The company has locations in the US states of Arizona, New Mexico, and Texas, and the Mexican states of Chihuahua and Coahuila. There are concentrations in El Paso and Cd. Juarez. The chain currently operates 23 restaurants; including recent additions in Tucson, Arizona and San Antonio, Texas. Their main dishes include tacos, quesadillas and many specialty salsas.

== History ==
El Taco Tote was founded in 1988 by the Pacifico Heras family in Juarez, Mexico. The first store located in the U.S. opened in 1994 in El Paso and the company incorporated that same year.

El Taco Tote Franchise Systems operates a chain of more than a dozen quick-service Mexican restaurants in Texas and the Southwest where customers prepare their own tacos. In addition to its U.S. locations, El Taco Tote has eight locations in Mexico.
