= El Torito =

Mexican restaurant chain located in the US

Coordinates: 37°25′59.2″N 121°53′50.9″W

- Industry: Restaurants
- Founded: 1954
- Founder: Larry J. Cano
- Headquarters: United States
- Website: www.eltorito.com

El Torito (Spanish for "the little bull") is an American chain that serves Mexican food. El Torito operates 25 restaurants all in California. El Torito is one of several Mexican cuisine restaurant chains operated by Xperience Restaurant Group.

Founded in 1954, El Torito claims to be "a pioneer in the California full service Mexican casual dining restaurant segment".

== History ==
El Torito was founded in 1954 by Larry J. Cano. Cano had served tours in the U.S Army in Europe and Korea, earned a business degree and worked tending bar. In 1954, he was the manager of a Polynesian restaurant. When the restaurant’s owner died, his widow passed ownership on to Cano. He began serving Mexican food at the restaurant, and it became the first El Torito. At one point, Cano began struggling financially and moved into the restaurant.

Within three years the restaurant became successful, and Cano opened additional locations. By 1976, he had 20 locations, and sold the business to W. R. Grace and Company for about $20 million. They hired Cano as the president with a directive for rapid expansion.

Grace sold its restaurants in a leveraged buyout in 1986. The resulting firm, Restaurant Enterprises Group, Inc. (REGI), filed for bankruptcy in 1993. In 1994, REGI was acquired out of bankruptcy by Foodmaker, who renamed itself to Family Restaurants, then Koo Koo Roo Enterprises, then Prandium. In 2000, Acapulco bought El Torito from Prandium. Acapulco renamed its parent company to Real Mex Restaurants in 2004 and moved the headquarters to Cypress, California.

In February 1994, engineers working on an extension of the CD-ROM specification visited El Torito in Irvine and later named the specification after the restaurant.

On October 3, 2011, Real Mex Restaurants filed for Chapter 11 bankruptcy and announced that it was putting itself up for sale, citing the poor economy. No plans were announced to close restaurants or layoff staff. It was acquired by a group of its noteholders in a bankruptcy auction in 2012.

In 2018, FM Restaurants HoldCo, LLC acquired Real Mex Restaurants out of bankruptcy and begun operating under Xperience Restaurant Group led by Randy Sharpe, former vice president of operations of the El Torito division. In 2020, during the COVID-19 pandemic, the group begun renovating 19 of their 31 locations in Southern California.
