= NRT (company) =

American real estate company

- Industry: Real estate brokerage
- Predecessor: National Realty Trust, Realogy Brokerage Group
- Founded: 1996; 30 years ago
- Fate: Acquired by Compass, Inc.
- Headquarters: Madison, New Jersey, United States

NRT (National Realty Trust) was an American residential real estate brokerage company headquartered in Madison, New Jersey. It operated under the brands Corcoran Group, Sotheby's International Realty, and Coldwell Banker. It was rebranded as Realogy Brokerage Group in 2020, Anywhere Real Estate in 2022, and was acquired by Compass, Inc. in 2026.

== History ==
National Realty Trust was formed in 1996 when Cendant, (then HFS Inc.) purchased Coldwell Banker. It was formed to acquire and operate residential real estate offices as franchised brokerages of Coldwell Banker, Century 21 Real Estate, and ERA Franchise Systems.

In 2001, Barbara Corcoran sold Corcoran Group to NRT for $66 million.

In 2002, Cendant bought out the interest in NRT owned by Apollo Global Management for about $230 million in stock and the assumption of about $300 million in net debt.

By 2006, NRT had acquired 320 companies and had 1,000 offices and 64,000 sales associates in 35 markets in the United States.

In April 2015, it acquired Coldwell Banker United, Realtors in Texas, Florida, North Carolina and South Carolina. It had 60 offices and 2,000 agents.

In August 2016, it acquired Climb Real Estate, one of the 10 largest brokerages in San Francisco.

In November 2017, it acquired Goodfellow Real Estate.

In February 2020, the company was rebranded as Realogy Brokerage Group. Realogy was rebranded as Anywhere Real Estate in 2022 and acquired by Compass, Inc. in 2026.

In January 2018, Ryan Gorman was named president and chief executive officer of NRT LLC.
