= ZipRealty =

Real estate listing website

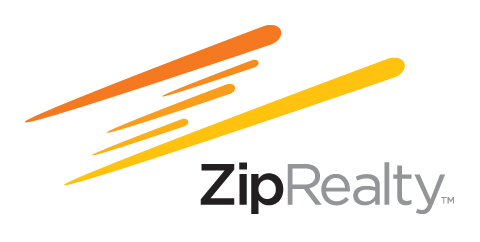
- Company type: Defunct
- Industry: Real estate
- Founded: 1999; 27 years ago
- Founders: Scott Kucirek; Juan Mini
- Fate: Acquired by Realogy and integrated into Coldwell Banker
- Headquarters: Emeryville, California, USA
- Area served: United States

ZipRealty was a website that offered real estate listings. In 2014, it was acquired by Realogy and it was later integrated into its Coldwell Banker subsidiary.

== History ==
The company was founded in 1999 by Scott Kucirek and Juan Mini, two graduates of the Haas School of Business at University of California, Berkeley. While they were still in school, they raised $1.7 million in venture capital, including $1.2 million from Vanguard Venture Partners. They took advantage of UC facilities, including free office space in the basement of the Bancroft Hotel.

In November 2004, the company became a public company via an initial public offering, raising $59 million.

In January 2011, the company shut down its operations in North Carolina.

In February 2011, Better Homes and Gardens Real Estate took over the company's listings in Atlanta.

In August 2014, the company was acquired by Realogy for $166 million. At that time, 85 agents were integrated into Coldwell Banker, another subsidiary of Realogy.

In March 2017, ZipRealty's sales professionals in Texas joined Coldwell Banker.

The company was fully integrated into Coldwell Banker.
