= Sherry Chris =

American businessperson

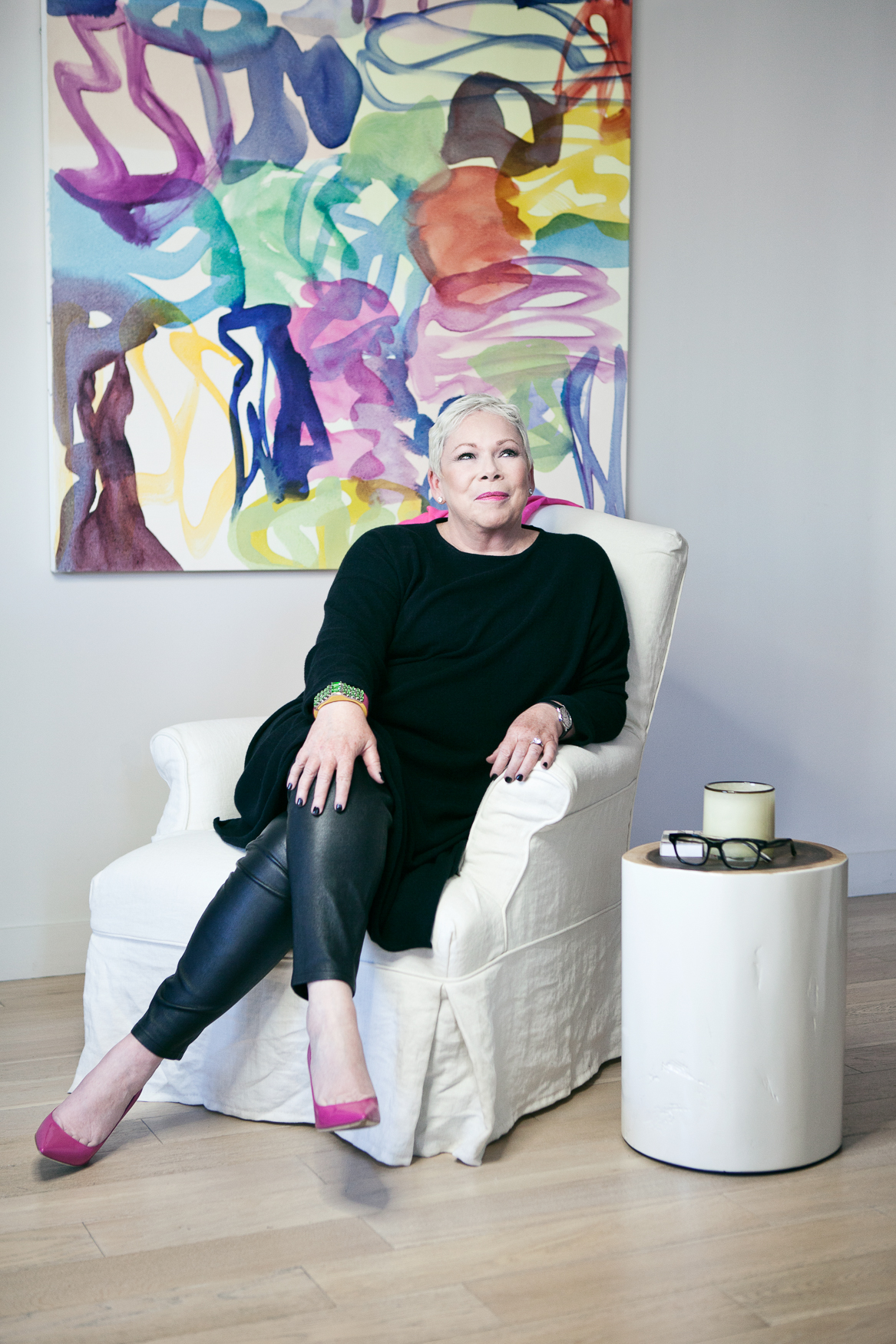
- Sherry Chris
- Born: 1954 or 1955 (age 70–71); Quebec
- Education: University of Western Ontario; Ivey Business School
- Occupations: Former President and CEO of Better Homes and Gardens Real Estate

Sherry Chris (born 1954 or 1955) is a Canadian former real estate brokerage executive most notable as the former president and CEO of Better Homes and Gardens Real Estate and the former COO of Coldwell Banker.

== Biography ==
=== Early life and education ===
Chris was born in Quebec and moved to London, Ontario at a young age. She comes from an Irish Catholic family with four siblings and two working parents.

Chris is a graduate of the University of Western Ontario and earned an MBA from Ivey Business School.

=== Career ===
Chris got into real estate after a bad homebuying experience. Chris began her career in 1980 at Ontario-based Gould Realty as a sales associate.

She then joined Canada Trust in the real estate brokerage operation. She began working with Royal LePage in 1987 as a branch and area manager. In 1997, she was promoted to regional manager and held a vice-president position in Toronto. In 1999, Chris was promoted to Executive Vice President of Network Services.

In 2003, Chris became the President of Real Living Network Services, where she worked until 2005, when she joined Prudential California Realty as Chief Operations Officer (COO).

In December 2006, Chris joined Realogy as the Chief Operating Officer of Coldwell Banker.

In 2008, Realogy launched a franchise network for the Better Homes and Gardens Real Estate brand, of which Chris was named CEO and president.

In September 2019, Chris was named president and chief executive officer of Realogy Expansion Brands.

Chris retired in May 2023.

In January 2025, Chris was engaged as an independent consultant and special advisor to CEO Nykia Wright by the National Association of Realtors.

== Personal life ==
In 2011, after being hired by Chris, Pantone made a custom color for Chris, SC2011 which is a shade of bright pink.

As of 2016, Chris lived in Tribeca.

Chris is gay and supported the legalization of same-sex marriage.
