= Wahls =

Wahls is a surname. Notable people with the surname include:

- Jessica Wahls (born 1977), German pop singer, songwriter, and television host
- Matthias Wahls (born 1968), German chess grandmaster and poker player
- Terry Wahls (born 1955), American physician
- Zach Wahls (born 1991), American politician, activist, and author

== See also ==
- Wahl (surname)
