= Damianos Sotheby's International Realty =

Bahamian real estate company

- Industry: Real estate
- Founded: 1945
- Founder: Nicholas G. Damianos
- Headquarters: New Providence, Nassau, The Bahamas
- Number of locations: 11
- Area served: Abaco, Eleuthera, Exuma, Guana Cay, Hope Town, Lyford Cay, Marsh Harbour, Nassau, Old Fort Bay, Paradise Island, Spanish Wells, Treasure Cay
- Key people: George Damianos
- Products: Luxury Bahamas Homes
- Services: Real estate sales & rental brokerage
- Website: www.sirbahamas.com

Damianos Sotheby's International Realty is a luxury Bahamas real estate firm founded in 1945 by Nicholas G. Damianos. This Bahamian company was originally named Damianos Realty, but had a name change when they acquired the Sotheby's International Realty franchise in 2005. Damianos Sotheby's International Realty is a member of the Bahamas Real Estate Association and the Bahamas MLS.

== History ==
Sotheby's Auction House was founded back in 1744 in London originally as an auctioneer of books. In 1976 Sotheby's International Realty was founded. The company operates as a franchise focusing on brokering and marketing of luxury real estate.

In February 2004, Realogy Holdings (NYSE: RLGY), a real estate franchising and provider of real estate brokerage entered into a long-term alliance with Sotheby's, the operator of the Auction House. The agreement provided for the licensing of the Sotheby’s International Realty name and the development of a full franchise system.

== Offices ==
As of the end of 2013, the Sotheby's International Realty network had more than 14,500 sales associates located in 700 offices in 52 countries and territories worldwide.

== Gallery ==
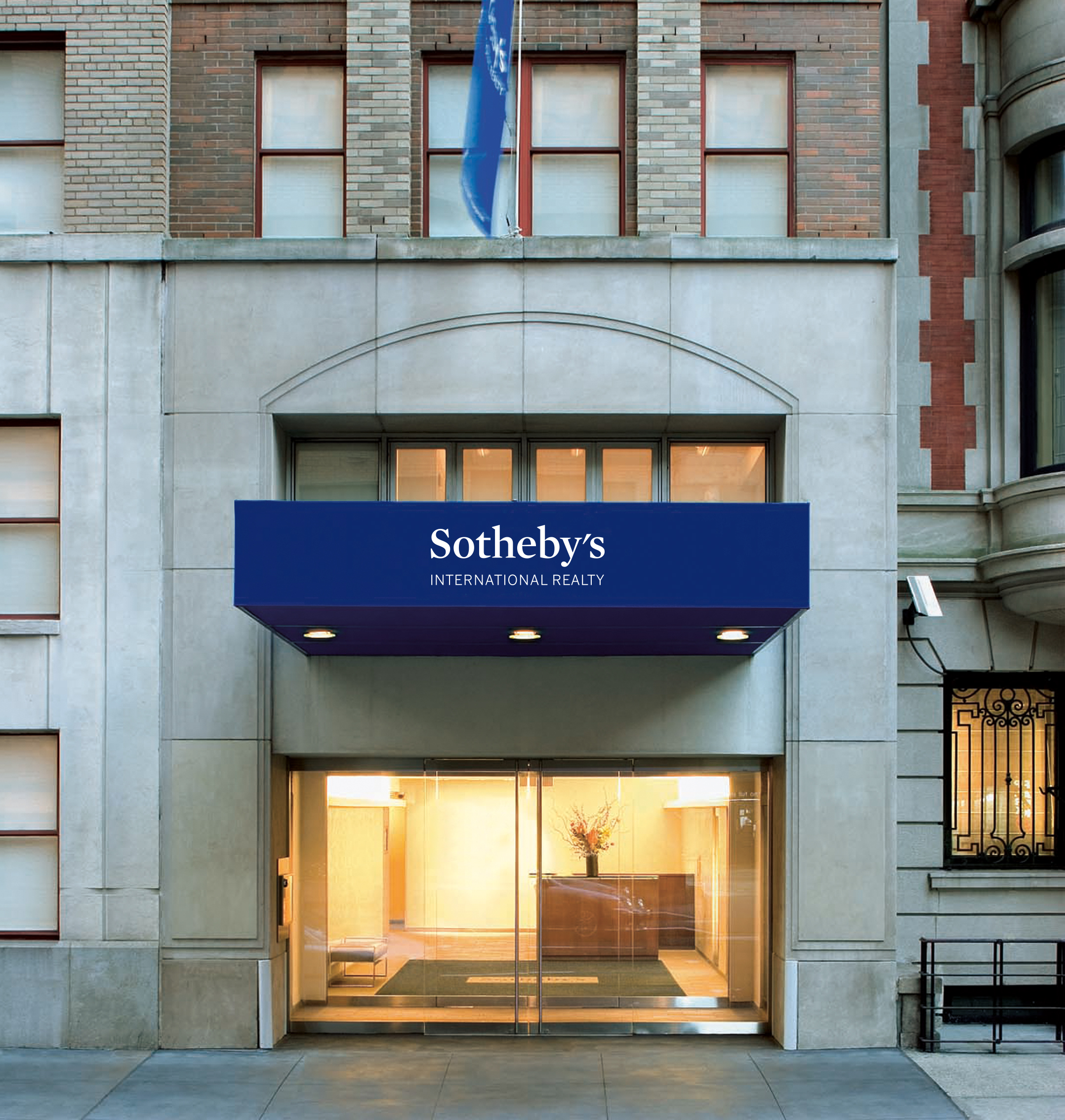
Shirley Street, Nassau Office, Damianos Sotheby's International Realty

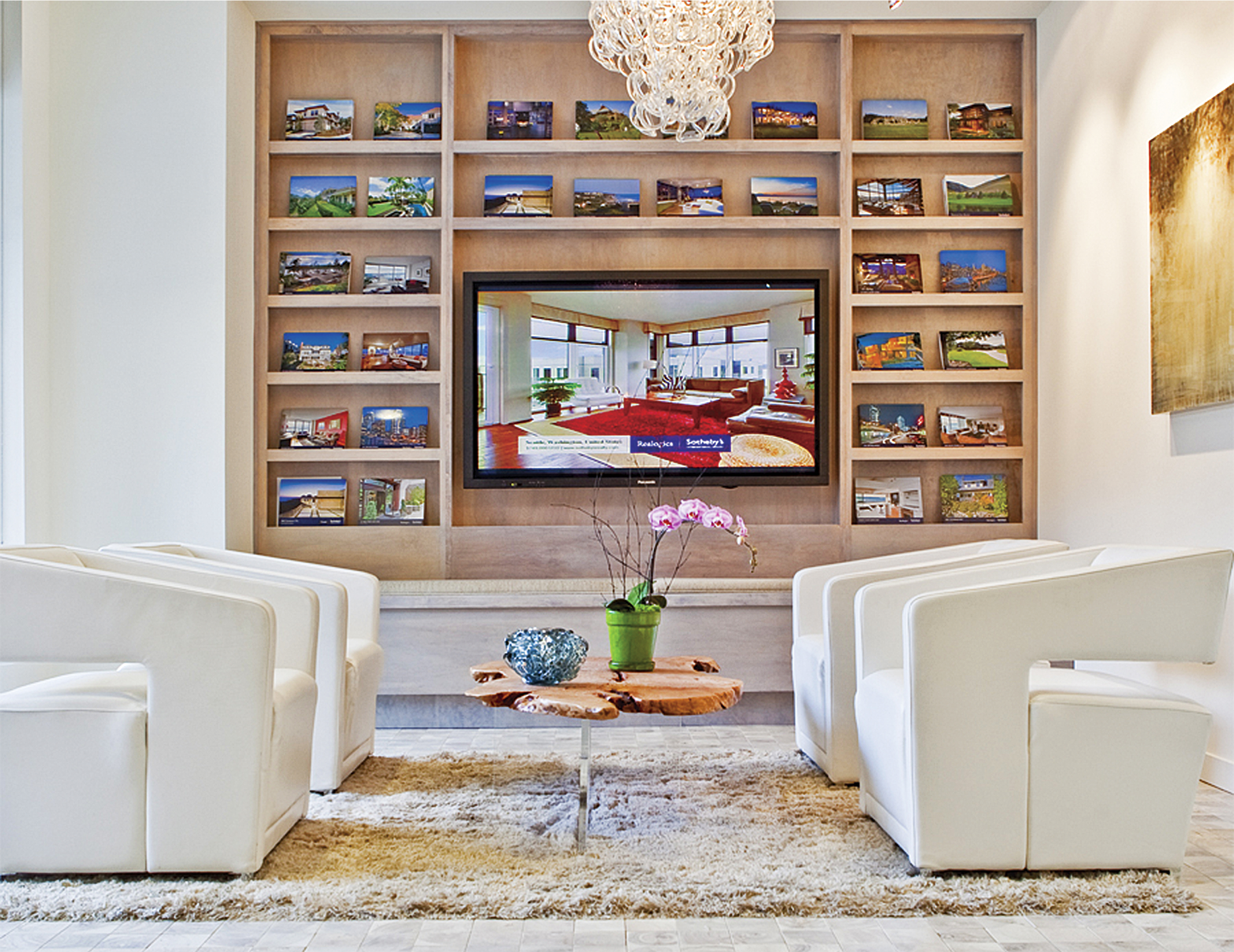
Marsh Harbour, Abaco Office, Damianos Sotheby's International Realty
