= Flagstar =

Flagstar is the name used by several businesses including:

- Flagstar Bank
- Flagstar Companies, a successor of Trans World Corporation, which ultimately changed its name to Denny's
