= Arthur E. Bartlett =

American businessman

Arthur E. "Art" Bartlett (November 26, 1933 – December 31, 2009) was an American entrepreneur and founder of the Century 21 Real Estate franchise. He and a partner founded the company in 1971 with a single office, which had expanded to 7,700 offices worldwide by the time of his death, though he had sold the business to Trans World Corporation in 1979 for $89 million.

Bartlett was born in Glens Falls, New York, and moved with his family to Long Beach, California in the 1940s. He attended Long Beach City College, but did not graduate. After a series of other jobs, he took up real estate in the early 1960s, accepting a position with a residential real estate firm in the San Fernando Valley. He would own his own real estate company, and met his future partner, Marshall Fisher, at a chance meeting at a diner.

Together with Fisher, he founded Century 21 with a single office in Santa Ana, California in 1971. The business sought to provide independent real estate agencies with the combined advertising, training and brand recognition of the parent franchiser — including its distinctive gold-colored jackets — helping them compete with national and regional chains. By 1977, Century 21 had 6,000 brokers and the firm's share of commissions and other licensing fees the following year reached $23 million. Trans World Corporation bought the company in 1979 for $28.50 per share in cash and convertible preferred stock, in a deal that valued the company at $89 million. By the time of Bartlett's death, the company had 120,000 agents and 7,700 offices worldwide.

Another real estate-related franchise — a home improvement chain called Mr. Build International — was established in the early 1980s, but was closed down by the end of the decade.

Bartlett died at age 76 as a result of complications of Alzheimer's disease while at his home in Coronado, California. He was survived by his second wife, Nancy Sanders, as well as by a daughter, a stepson, a granddaughter and three stepgrandchildren. His first marriage, to the former Collette Cupiss, ended with her death in 2002.
