= Bruce Littlefield =

American author

- Born: South Carolina
- Occupations: Author, television contributor, restaurateur
- Spouse: Scott Stewart (m. 2017)
- Website: brucelittefield.com

Bruce Littlefield is an American author and TV contributor. He is the regarded as an American "lifestyle authority". He has been called a "Modern Day Erma Bombeck", and is featured as a "design and lifestyle guru" on Howdini.com.

He is the author of numerous books, including an Americana series with HarperCollins, and has co-written several books including Use What You've Got with Barbara Corcoran, My Two Moms with Zach Wahls, and The Sell with Fredrik Eklund. He appears on television, having made notable TV lifestyle segments on Today Show, Early Show, and The View.

== Early life and education ==
Littlefield was born in South Carolina and graduated in 1985 from Brookland-Cayce High School in Cayce, South Carolina. He went to the University of South Carolina where he wrote for The Daily Gamecock newspaper, and graduated in 1989 with a degree in broadcast journalism and membership in Phi Beta Kappa.

== Career ==
After graduation, Littlefield moved to New York City and worked as a model and an actor until being awarded scholarships by the Freedom Forum and Mortar Board to do graduate studies. He obtained his MA in journalism from NYU's School of Journalism in 1995.

Littlefield has appeared on The Rachael Ray Show and has been featured in The New York Times, The Boston Globe, the New York Post, People Magazine, the National Enquirer, OK! Magazine, Saveur, This Old House, the New York Daily News, Miami Herald, The Boston Herald, Chicago Tribune, USA Today, and the Los Angeles Times.

In 2002, with partner Scott Stewart, a senior vice president at the Corcoran Group, he opened the Rosendale Cement Company restaurant in Rosendale, New York, and then in 2005 opened a second restaurant, The Alamo. Both restaurants were later sold.

In 2010, Littlefield was a holiday spokesperson for TJ Maxx and Marshalls.

== Bibliography ==
- Airstream Living (2005) ISBN 0060833068
- Garage Sale America (2007) ISBN 0061151653
- Merry Christmas America (2007) ISBN 0061348295
- The Bedtime Book for Dogs (2011) ISBN 0446575917
- Moving In: Tales of an Unlicensed Marriage (2013) ISBN 1480050814
- Everything You Need to Know About Life You Can Learn from a Dog (2026) ISBN 0593698010

=== Collaborations ===
- (with Barbara Corcoran) Use What You've Got and Other Business Lessons I Learned from My Mom (2003) ISBN 1591840023
- (with Zach Wahls) My Two Moms: Lessons of Love, Strength, and What Makes a Family (2012) ISBN 1592407137
- (with Lis Wiehl) Lis Wiehl's Truth Advantage: The 7 Keys to a Happy and Fulfilling Life (2012) ISBN 1118025156
- (with Fredrik Eklund) The Sell: The Secrets of Selling Anything to Anyone (2016) ISBN 1592409318
