= Better Homes and Gardens Real Estate =

American real estate company

Better Homes and Gardens Real Estate LLC
- Type: Subsidiary
- Industry: Real estate
- Founded: July 2008; 18 years ago, in Parsippany, New Jersey, U.S.
- Headquarters: Madison, New Jersey, United States
- Key people: Ginger Wilcox (brand president)
- Parent: Compass, Inc.
- Website: www.bhgre.com

Better Homes and Gardens Real Estate LLC is an international real estate company. It began operations in July 2008. It is based in Madison, New Jersey.

As of 2024, it had approximately 12,490 independent sales associates and around 400 offices located throughout the United States, Canada, Jamaica, the Bahamas, Australia and New Zealand.

Better Homes and Gardens Real Estate franchises independent businesses to operate within its network.

The Better Homes and Gardens Real Estate network is composed of independently owned and operated franchises. The network includes several large companies, Better Homes and Gardens Real Estate Metro Brokers (Atlanta), Better Homes and Gardens Real Estate The Masiello Group (New England), and Better Homes and Gardens Real Estate Reliance Partners (California).

== History ==
In 1978, Meredith Corporation, publisher of Better Homes and Gardens, launched the Better Homes and Gardens Real Estate Service. Meredith owned and operated Better Homes and Gardens Real Estate Service from 1978 to 1998. Meredith then sold the real estate business in 1998 to GMAC Home Services Inc., a subsidiary of GMAC Financial Services, while retaining the Better Homes and Gardens name. GMAC was given the right to use the Better Homes and Gardens Real Estate Service name for up to 10 years after the sale, after which it was phased out.

In October 2007, Meredith Corporation granted Realogy Holdings Corp. the right to license the Better Homes and Gardens name and related trademarks for 100 years. Realogy re-launched the Better Homes and Gardens franchise network on July 1, 2008 and named Sherry Chris, then COO of Coldwell Banker, CEO and president of the newly launched company. Better Homes and Gardens Real Estate became the fifth residential real estate brand launched by Realogy. In 2022, Realogy rebranded as Anywhere Real Estate, Inc.

The network grew substantially after its reintroduction in 2008 and expanded into Canada in 2011.
