= Alain Pinel Realtors =

Residential real estate company in California

- Company type: Privately held company
- Industry: Real estate
- Founded: 1990; 36 years ago
- Founders: Alain Pinel, Helen Pastorino, and Paul L. Hulme
- Defunct: May 2019; 7 years ago
- Fate: Acquired by Compass, Inc.
- Headquarters: San Francisco, United States
- Number of locations: 32 offices
- Area served: San Francisco Bay Area
- Key people: Paul L. Hulme (CEO)
- Services: Residential real estate brokerage
- Owners: Paul Hulme, Tina Cole, Russell Hulme, Allen Hulme and Michael Hulme

Alain Pinel Realtors was a residential real estate brokerage focused on luxury real estate in the San Francisco Bay Area. As of 2017, it had 1,400 agents, $278 million in annual revenue and was the fourth largest residential real estate brokerage in the U.S. In May 2019, the company was acquired by Compass, Inc.

== History ==
Alain Pinel Realtors was co-founded in 1990 by Alain Pinel (original CEO and President), together with Helen Pastorino and Paul L. Hulme.

In 2018, it acquired Hill & Co., which had 50 agents in three San Francisco neighborhoods.

In May 2019, the company was acquired by Compass, Inc.
