= Christie's International Real Estate =

International real estate firm network

- Industry: Luxury real estate
- Founded: 1987; 39 years ago as Great Estates
- Number of locations: Worldwide
- Key people: Thaddeus Wong (CEO); Michael Golden (CEO); Kevin Van Eck ( President - Affiliate Strategy); Natalie Hamrick (President - Affiliate Services & Growth)
- Services: Real estate brokerage firm
- Number of employees: 69
- Parent: Compass, Inc.

Christie's International Real Estate is a luxury real estate brokerage firm. It has a brand license from British auction house Christie's, but is currently owned by US firm Compass, Inc.

It has a large international portfolio of more than 400 offices and approximately 10,000 real estate agents operating in nearly 50 countries and territories.

Notable properties brokered by the company include the Playboy Mansion in Los Angeles, California, which sold for over US$100 million in 2016.

== History ==
Christie’s International Real Estate was founded in 1987 as Great Estates.

In 1995, the Great Estates brand was acquired by Christie’s, the London-based auction house, and in 2011, Christie’s changed the name from Christie’s Great Estates to Christie’s International Real Estate.

In December 2021, a venture led by Mike Golden and Thad Wong, co-founders of @properties, acquired Christie’s International Real Estate from Christie’s, entering into a long-term global brand licensing agreement.

In 2024, it was acquired by Compass, Inc. for $444 million.

In January 2025, Compass completed its acquisition of @properties Christie's International Real Estate.
