= El Pollo Loco (Mexico) =

Restaurant chain

El Pollo Loco, S.A. de C.V.

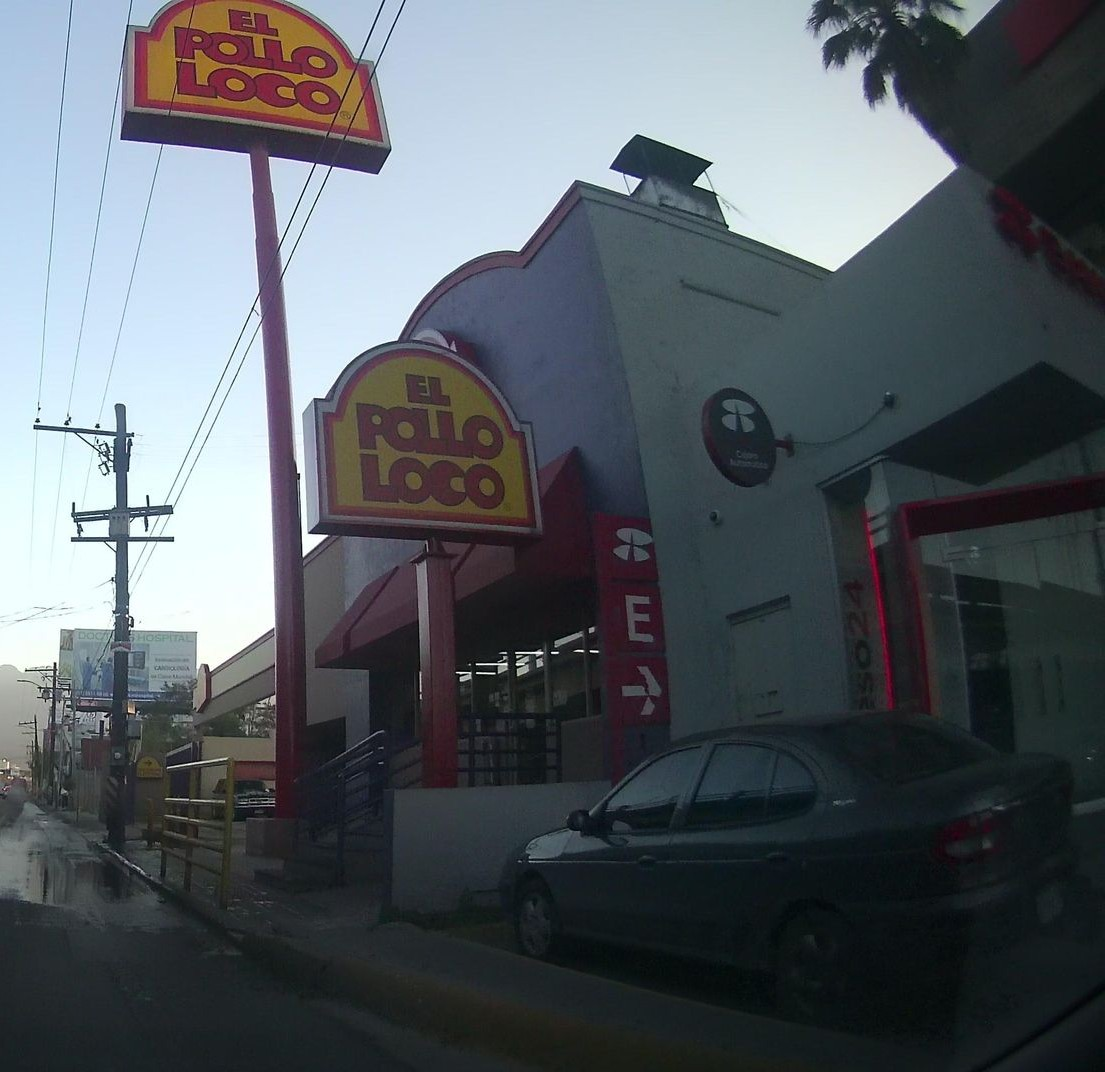
- A Pollo Loco franchise in Monterrey
- Trade name: El Pollo Loco
- Type: Private
- Industry: Casual dining restaurant, Restaurants
- Founded: January 6, 1974; 52 years ago in Guasave, Sinaloa, Mexico
- Founder: Juan Francisco Ochoa
- Headquarters: San Pedro Garza García, Nuevo León, Mexico
- Number of locations: 52 (October 2017)
- Area served: Mexico (Coahuila, Michoacán, Nuevo León, Sinaloa, Tamaulipas, and Mexico D.F.)
- Products: Fire-grilled chicken and related Mexican food
- Website: www.elpolloloco.com.mx

El Pollo Loco, S.A. de C.V. is a Mexico-based restaurant chain specializing in Sinaloa-style marinated grilled chicken. It was founded by Juan Francisco Ochoa, whose family still owns the Mexican chain. The El Pollo Loco locations in Mexico are not affiliated with or operated by the American El Pollo Loco, Inc. El Pollo Loco operates in over 50 locations within Mexico City and the states of Coahuila, Nuevo León, Michoacán, Querétaro, Sinaloa, and Tamaulipas, of which 28 are located in Nuevo León.

== History of the Mexican chain ==
Ochoa opened his first location in Guasave in the state of Sinaloa on January 6, 1974, at a small roadside location containing ten tables and with a starting working capital of 15 thousand pesos. His wife Flérida created a fruit-based marinade which was used to coat the chicken for several hours prior to grilling. After a few hours of operations on their first day, they sold out all 43 chickens.

Three years later, Ochoa's brother Jaime quit his job and opened the company's second location in San Luis Potosi. This was quickly followed by other locations that were opened and operated by Ochoa's other brothers and sisters in Guadalajara, Morelia, Monterrey, and Saltillo.

By the end of 1979, Ochoa had 85 restaurants in 20 cities throughout Northern Mexico with many of the locations operated by family members or close friends. At that time, Ochoa thought about expanding north of the borders into areas of the United States that he had previously visited. In 1980, Ochoa opened his first U.S. location on Alvarado Street in Los Angeles, an area which had a high concentration of immigrants from Sinaloa.

The company rapidly expanded on both sides of the international border during the early 1980s. However a number of bad decisions caused by a non-related manager caused the company to accumulate $3 million in debts and created a cash flow problem that forced Ochoa to sell his properties outside Mexico to help cover those debts.

In September 1983, Ochoa sold the 19 U.S. locations, all of which were located in Southern California, to Denny's for either $12.6 million or $11.3 million. At the time of the sale, Ochoa had retained 92 locations within Mexico. As part of the agreement, Denny's promised to assist Ochoa in opening new locations in the parts of Mexico that Ochoa's company did not then occupy. In 2004, the Mexican company filed suit in U.S. Federal Court against the American company for failure to fulfill the joint expansion agreement. After three years of litigation, the Court ruled against the American company and ordered the American company to pay $22 million in damages and to return the ownership of the "El Pollo Loco" trademark and intellectual property within Mexico to the Mexican company.

As a result of the debt debacle created during the early 1980s by a non-family manager, the number of locations has since shrunk to approximately 40 locations, all of which are managed and operated by family members.

After the sale of the American locations in 1983, Ochoa restricted his business activities to Mexico. However, the lure of new business activities north of the Rio Grande was too hard to resist and Ochoa opened his new business, called Taco Palenque, in Laredo, Texas in 1987.

In December 2020, the company test marketed a chicken, rice, bean, in chipotle sauce burrito in their Senderos location and later expanded their test to four more markets the following month before being released chain-wide by May 2021.

== Fare ==
Unlike its American counterpart, the Mexican chain has kept its menu simple and focused on the grilled chicken. Deboned chicken or other meats like shrimp or carne asada are not available. The company avoided carrying standard Mexican-American fare such as tacos, burritos, enchiladas and quesadillas as recently as March 2021, By September 2021, the company added burritos and quesadillas to their menu in a move that makes their menu closer to that used by their American counterpart.

== Controversies ==
In January 2016, the Secretaría de Salud de Nuevo León, the Health Ministry for the Mexican state of Nuevo León, closed several franchised locations of El Pollo Loco for several health code violations. At least one of the locations was owned by Mexican politician Marco González, who claimed that the closures were politically motivated.

== See also ==
- List of fast-food chicken restaurants
