= Stephen Carley =

American businessman

- Education: University of Illinois College of Business
- Occupation: American businessman
- Known for: Former CEO of Red Robin

Stephen Carley is an American businessman who was CEO of Red Robin Gourmet Burgers, Inc.. Carley also was CEO of El Pollo Loco, Inc. from 2001 to 2010.

== Education ==
Carley attended the University of Illinois College of Business where he graduated with a bachelor's degree in finance. He later attended Northwestern University where he received a master's degree with a concentration in marketing.

== Career ==
Carley began his career in the food and beverage industry with PepsiCo Inc. During his 12 years at Pepsico during the 1980s and 1990s, Carley held several posts at Taco Bell. Carley also served in various management positions with several companies, including, PhotoPoint Corp., and Universal City Hollywood.

From April 2001 to August 2010, he was CEO of El Pollo Loco, Inc., a privately held restaurant company headquartered in Costa Mesa, California. Carley appeared in NBC's The Apprentice. During the sixth-season episode, Carley was the first person other than Trump to delegate an assignment to the contestants.

Carley joined Red Robin as CEO in September 2010. He retired in 2016.
