= Barbara Corcoran =

American businesswoman (born 1949)

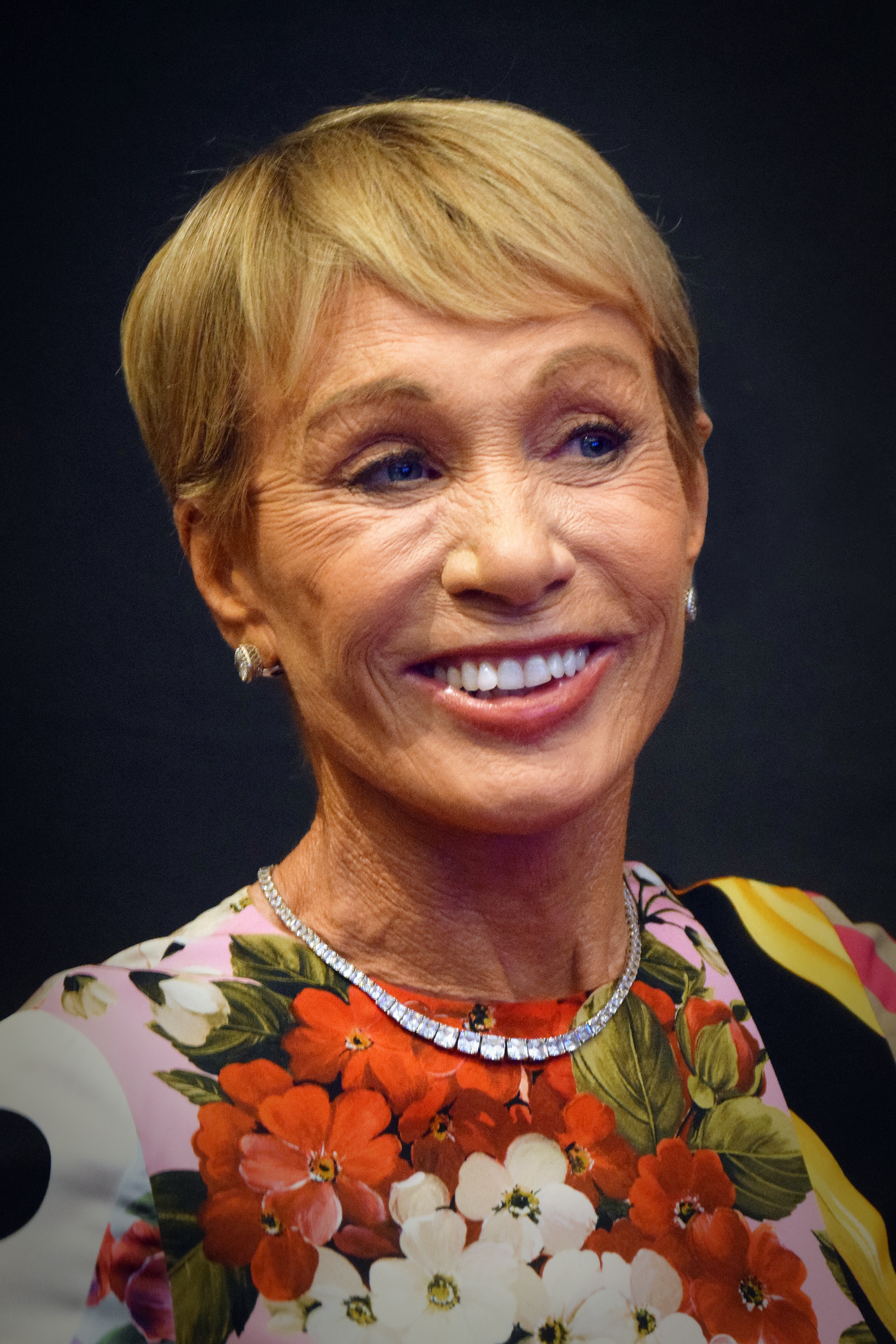
- Corcoran in 2023
- Born: Barbara Ann Corcoran; March 10, 1949 (age 77); Edgewater, New Jersey, U.S.
- Education: St. Thomas Aquinas College (BEd)
- Occupations: Commentator and Television personality, investor
- Spouse: Bill Higgins (m. 1988)
- Children: 2
- Website: Official website

Barbara Ann Corcoran (born March 10, 1949) is an American businesswoman, investor, syndicated columnist, and television personality. She founded the Corcoran Group, a real estate brokerage in New York City, which she sold to NRT for $66 million in 2001 and shortly thereafter exited the company. Corcoran is an original "Shark" investor on ABC's Shark Tank, and has appeared in all of its 17 seasons. As of January 2023, she has made 130 deals on the show, the largest being a $350,000 investment for 40% of Coverplay.

Corcoran is a columnist for More, The Daily Review, and Redbook, writes a weekly column in the New York Daily News, and has written several books. She has been featured on Larry King Live and NBC's Today show, and hosts The Millionaire Broker with Barbara Corcoran on CNBC.

== Early life and education ==
Corcoran was born in Edgewater, New Jersey, the second of 10 children in a working class Irish-Catholic family. Her mother, Florence, was a homemaker. Her father, Edwin W. Corcoran Jr., bounced from job to job throughout Corcoran's childhood. At times, her family relied on deliveries of free food from a friendly local grocer. Corcoran remembers her father as a man who occasionally drank too much and treated her mother with disrespect and condescension, particularly when he'd been drinking.

Corcoran struggled throughout her schooling, and was labeled the "dumb kid" by her teachers and classmates. She later learned that she had dyslexia, and has stated that the bullying "drove her to work harder and learn the skills she needed to succeed". She attended a local Catholic elementary school and started high school at St. Cecilia High School in Englewood. After flunking several courses during her freshman year, Corcoran transferred to Leonia High School, where she graduated as a D student.

Corcoran graduated from St. Thomas Aquinas College with a degree in education in 1971, faring better than she had in her previous schooling.

== Career ==
After graduating from college, she taught school for a year but soon moved on. She had worked a total of 20 jobs by the time she was 23, including a side job renting apartments in New York City. While she was a waitress, her boyfriend convinced her to work for a real estate company. She wanted to be her own boss, and in 1973, while working as a receptionist for the Giffuni Brothers' real estate company in New York City, she co-founded The Corcoran-Simonè with her boyfriend, who lent her $1,000. She split from her boyfriend seven years later after he told her he was going to marry her secretary. She then formed her own firm, The Corcoran Group.

In the mid-1970s, she also began publishing The Corcoran Report, a newsletter covering real estate data trends in New York City.

In 2001, Corcoran sold her business to NRT for $66 million.

In September 2017, Corcoran was announced as a contestant for season 25 of Dancing with the Stars, where she was partnered with Keo Motsepe.

In 2017, Corcoran's Shark Tank deal with The Comfy, an oversized wearable blanket, turned her $50,000 investment into $468 million in three years. She was then bought out.

Formerly known as Barbara Corcoran Venture Partners, today Forefront Venture Partners invests in high-growth, revenue-generating, early-stage companies.

== Personal life ==
Corcoran lives in Manhattan with her husband, Bill Higgins, a retired U.S. Navy captain and former FBI agent who participated in the Gulf War. The couple married in 1988. Corcoran gave birth to their son in 1994, via in vitro fertilization, with an egg donated by her sister Florence. The couple later adopted a daughter.

In 2001, she purchased a 2,700-square-foot apartment in a co-op building on Park Avenue for $3.5 million. In 2015, she purchased a penthouse unit on Fifth Avenue for $10 million. In 2017, she purchased a double wide trailer home in California for $800,000.

In 2019, for her 70th birthday, she held a mock funeral.

Her hobbies include skiing and going to the beach.

She lost her home, the $800,000 double wide, in the Pacific Palisades wildfire, in January 2025.

== Selected bibliography ==
- If You Don't Have Big Breasts, Put Ribbons On Your Pigtails: and Other Lessons I Learned From My Mom; (aka "Use What You've Got"). New York City: Penguin. 2003. ISBN 1-59184-002-3. (co-authored with Bruce Littlefield)
- Nextville: Amazing Places to Live Your Life. Springboard Press. 2008. ISBN 978-0-446-17827-3.
- Shark Tales: How I Turned $1,000 into a Billion Dollar Business. SPortfolio Trade. 2011. ISBN 978-1-59184-418-1. (co-authored with Bruce Littlefield)
