= Robert Reffkin =

American entrepreneur

- Born: June 7, 1979 (age 47)
- Education: Columbia University (BA, MBA)
- Occupation: Entrepreneur
- Known for: Co-founder and CEO of Compass, Inc.

Robert L. Reffkin is an American entrepreneur who co-founded the online real estate brokerage Compass, Inc. and serves as the company's CEO.

== Biography ==
Reffkin is African American and Jewish and grew up in Berkeley, California. His father was an African American man from Louisiana, who already had two children, and shortly after Reffkin was born abandoned him and his mother. Reffkin's mother, Ruth, emigrated from Israel at age 7 and was later disowned by her family after they learned that she was pregnant by an African American man. Since his mother never married his biological father, Reffkin took his surname from Gene Reffkin, his mother's former husband, who is also his godfather. His father, a jazz musician, died when he was 11 years old.

Through A Better Chance, he was matched with and enrolled in San Francisco University High School, where he also delivered its 2021 commencement address. In 1994, Reffkin started his first business at age 15—a DJ company funded by his bar mitzva and babysitting savings. He was involved with the Network For Teaching Entrepreneurship as a teenager.

In 2000, Reffkin graduated from Columbia University with a bachelor's degree in under two years. After graduating from Columbia, he worked for McKinsey & Company from 2000 to 2002 before returning to school and graduated from Columbia Business School with a M.B.A. in 2003. At the time of his hiring, he was the youngest analyst hired by McKinsey.

He then moved into investment banking and spent two years working for Lazard. Between 2005 and 2006, Reffkin was a White House Fellow and worked for Secretary of the Treasury John W. Snow. He returned to investment banking afterwards as a vice president for Goldman Sachs, becoming chief of staff for president and COO Gary Cohn.

In 2007, Reffkin began a nonprofit, New York Needs You (now America Needs You) to mentor low-income college students. He did a $1 million fundraising by running a marathon in each of the 50 states in the United States and launched NYNY in 2009.

In 2012, he co-founded the online real estate technology company Compass, Inc. with Ori Allon. The inspiration for his business came from his mother, who suffered hardships working as a real estate agent. Reffkin was inspired to use technology to improve the ability of agents to build their brand, analyze data, and conduct market research to make their business more efficient and profitable. His net worth stood at $500 million following the IPO of his company.

Reffkin worked with Peter Koechley, Upworthy co-founder and former managing editor of The Onion, in writing the book No One Succeeds Alone: Learn Everything You Can from Everyone You Can, published in 2021.
