= El Pollo Loco =

American and Mexican fast food restaurant chains

Logo for the Mexico-based El Pollo Loco

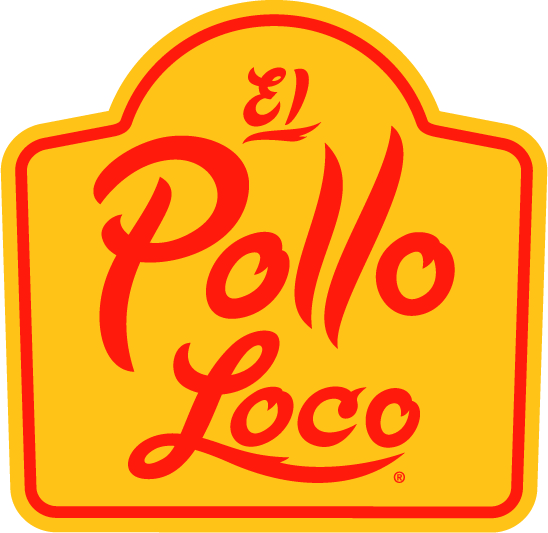
Logo for the US-based El Pollo Loco

El Pollo Loco (Spanish for "The Crazy Chicken") is the name of three independent restaurant chains that specialize in Mexican-style grilled chicken. The Mexican and American companies were founded by Mexican American Juan Francisco Ochoa. The company began to franchisee in 1991.

Ochoa established the first El Pollo Loco restaurant in Guasave, Sinaloa, Mexico in 1974. He then expanded his chain into the United States in 1980. He later sold his U.S. restaurants in 1983 while keeping the ones in Mexico. The two North American companies have since occupied non-overlapping global territories and have offered different fare.

- El Pollo Loco (Mexico) is the chain still owned by Ochoa's family and operates over 50 (as of 2017) locations within Mexico.
- El Pollo Loco (United States) operates about 500 (as of 2019) company-owned and franchised restaurants primarily in the Southwestern United States. Since 2014, the U.S.-based company has been publicly traded on the NASDAQ stock exchange under the ticker LOCO.
- El Pollo Loco (Philippines) is a subsidiary of Manila-based The Bistro Group that operated 10 (as of 2023) company-owned restaurants within the Manila metropolitan area.

== See also ==
- List of fast-food chicken restaurants
