= Taco Palenque =

Mexican restaurant chain in Texas and Nuevo León

- Type: Privately held company
- Industry: Fast casual
- Founded: 1987; 39 years ago
- Founder: Juan Francisco Ochoa (Pancho Ochoa)
- Headquarters: Laredo, Texas
- Number of locations: 42 (39 in Texas, 3 in Mexico)
- Area served: Texas, Nuevo León
- Products: Mexican food
- Website: tacopalenque.com

Taco Palenque is a Mexican cuisine restaurant chain in the U.S. state of Texas and the Mexican state of Nuevo León. The restaurant is headquartered in Laredo, Texas and was established in 1987. The restaurant's main dishes are the flame-grilled beef or chicken fajita plate, parrillada, pirata taco, panchos drizzled with beans and cheese on top of tortilla chips, homemade desserts, and breakfast tacos. Taco Palenque's salad bar has more than seven different homemade salsas.

== History ==
Taco Palenque was founded by Juan Francisco Ochoa (who goes by "Pancho") from Sinaloa, Mexico. Ochoa was also the creator of the El Pollo Loco secret chicken recipe and founder of the Grilled chicken concept. Monterrey where he planned to create a Mexican fastfood chain in the United States with drive thrus that served authentic Mexican food. In 1987, Ochoa opened Taco Palenque in Laredo, Texas. The chain expanded to McAllen in 1998, Brownsville in 2019, San Antonio in 2019, Nuevo Laredo, Mexico in 2020, Houston, Texas in 2020, Mission, Texas, Cotulla, Texas in 2022, Weslaco, Texas in 2022 and, Round Rock, Texas in 2021. In 2022 Palenque grill was established.

Currently, Taco Palenque expanded his restaurants to Mexico & there are 3 locations in Monterrey, Nuevo León.

== Subsidiaries ==
=== Palenque Grill ===
Palenque Grill is a subsidiary of Taco Palenque. Palenque Grill was established in 2005 with the opening of its first restaurant in Laredo. Unlike Taco Palenque, Palenque Grill is a casual dining table-service restaurant that features premium ingredients, margaritas, parrilladas, appetizers and desserts. These restaurants are higher-end than the regular Taco Palenque.

A second location was opened in McAllen in 2006. This was followed by the opening of a third location in San Antonio in 2011. A second Laredo location, fourth in the chain, was open in 2016. A fifth location was open in Edinburg in 2019.

The official slogan for Palenque Grill is "Un Rinconcito de Mexico" which means "A little corner of Mexico." A 2012 restaurant review in the San Antonio Express-News gave the Palenque Grill four out of a possible five stars and called the restaurant "a good choice for a visit".

=== Pollo Palenque ===
Pollo Palenque (formally named Pollo Tori) is another subsidiary of Taco Palenque. Pollo Palenque is a fast-food restaurant chain specializing in Mexican grilled chicken. The restaurant's main dish is pollo asado, a grilled marinated chicken. The meal is usually served with salsa, totopos and tortillas. The restaurant is currently only located on the border. It is located in Laredo, Texas, the Rio Grande Valley and a new location in Corpus Christi.

== See also ==
- El Pollo Loco
- List of Mexican restaurants
- List of Texas companies (T)
