= El Pollo Loco (United States) =

Restaurant chain

El Pollo Loco, Inc.
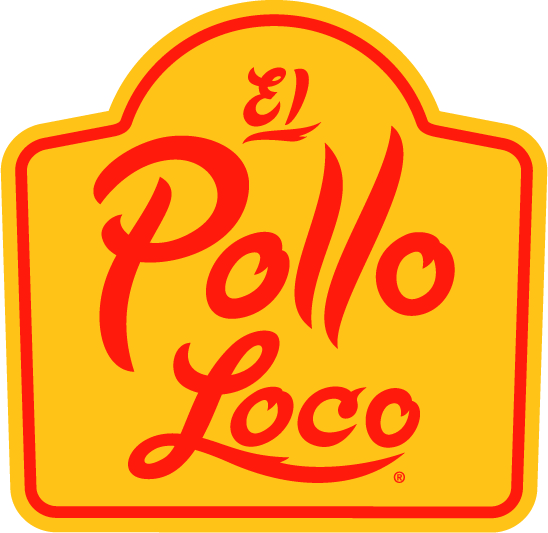
- Logo since 2019

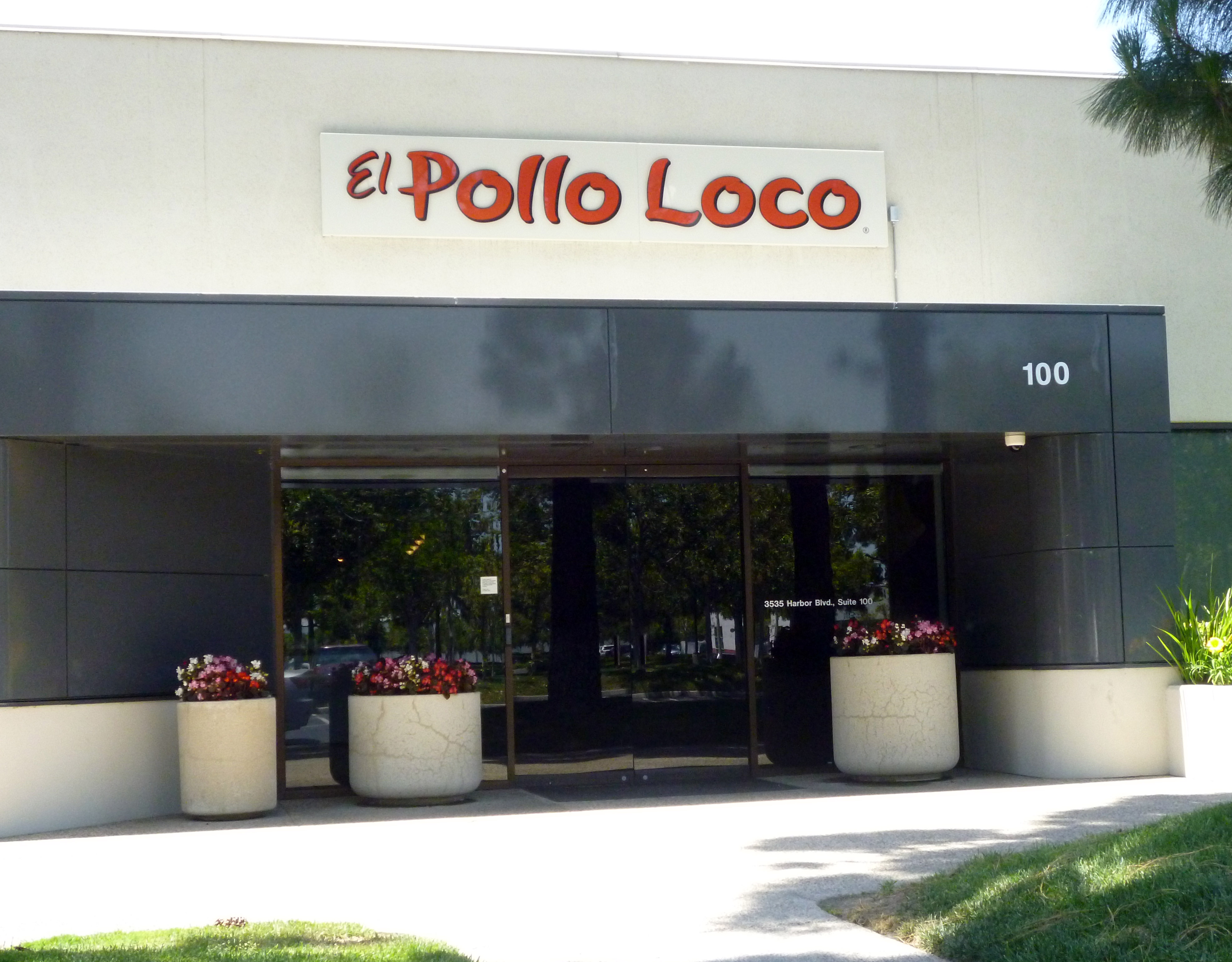
- Entrance to Costa Mesa headquarters
- Trade name: El Pollo Loco
- Type: Public
- Traded as: Nasdaq: LOCO
- Industry: Restaurants Franchising
- Genre: Fast Casual
- Founded: Guasave, Sinaloa, México (1974; 52 years ago); Los Angeles, California, United States (December 8, 1980; 45 years ago)
- Founder: Juan Francisco Ochoa
- Headquarters: Costa Mesa, California
- Area served: Arizona, California, Colorado, Idaho, Nevada, New Mexico, Texas, Louisiana, Utah, Washington
- Key people: Liz Williams (CEO); Ira Fils (CFO)); Damon Thomas (COO); Jill Adams (CMO); Jason Weintraub (CLO) Tara Hinkle (CDO); Vadim Parizher (CIO)
- Products: Fire-grilled chicken and related Mexican food
- Revenue: ▲US$455 million (FY 2021)
- Operating income: ▲US$33.556 million (FY 2020)
- Net income: ▲US$24.474 million (FY 2020)
- Total assets: ▲US$31.669 million (FY 2020)
- Total equity: ▲US$277.578 million (FY 2020)
- Number of employees: 5,005 (2021)
- Website: www.elpolloloco.com

El Pollo Loco, Inc. (lit. 'The Crazy Chicken'), is a restaurant chain based in the United States, specializing in Mexican-style grilled chicken. Restaurant service consists of dine-in and take-out, with some locations offering drive-through options. The company is headquartered in Costa Mesa, California, and operates about 500 (as of January 2019) company-owned and franchised restaurants in the Southwestern United States.

== Fare ==
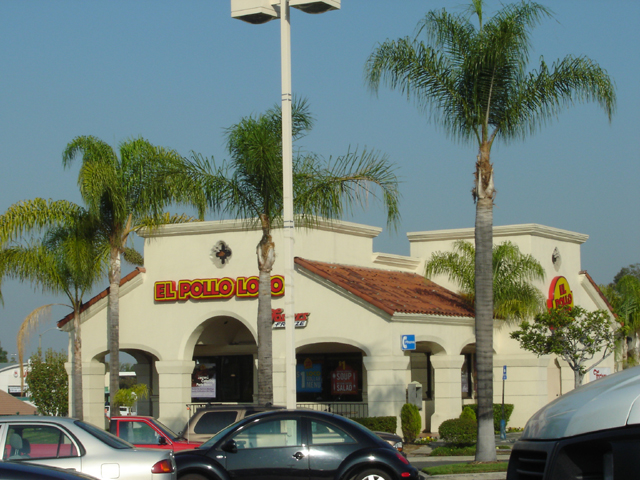
A typical El Pollo Loco restaurant as shown in 2006

El Pollo Loco prepares primarily Mexican chicken entrees. The company describes its chicken as "citrus-marinated and fire-grilled." The American company also offers Mexican-style food, such as tacos, burritos, tostada salads, chicken bowls, snacks, salsas, sides, and quesadillas.

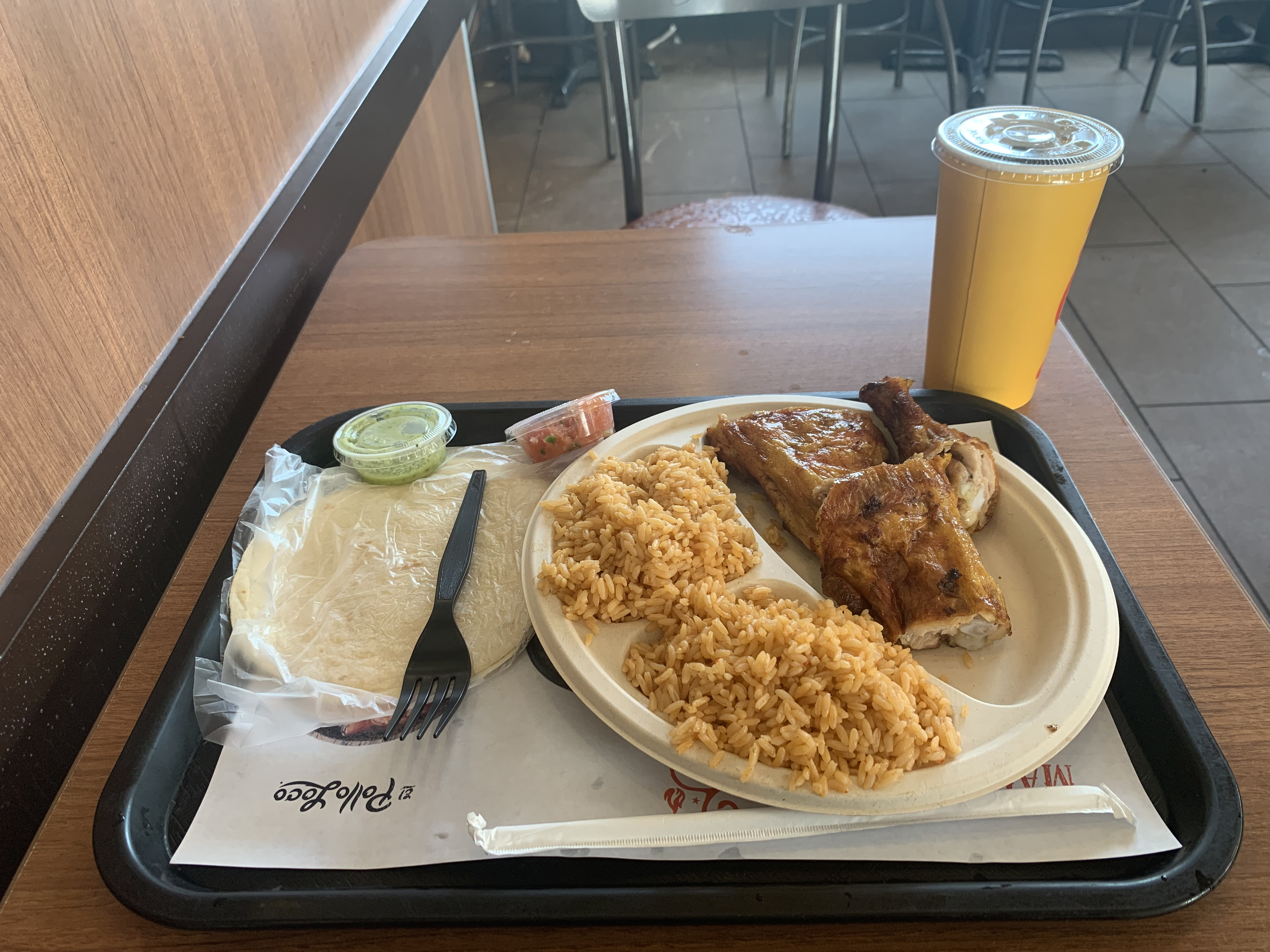
A common meal from the chain.

In a bid to compete with such companies as KFC and Chick-fil-A, El Pollo Loco experimented with offering deep-fried chicken in the form of breaded chicken tenders at selected locations in the United States for a limited time during the Fall 2016. This experiment was a big departure from its previous marketing campaigns that tout their fire-grilled chicken as a healthful alternative to fried chicken.

== History ==
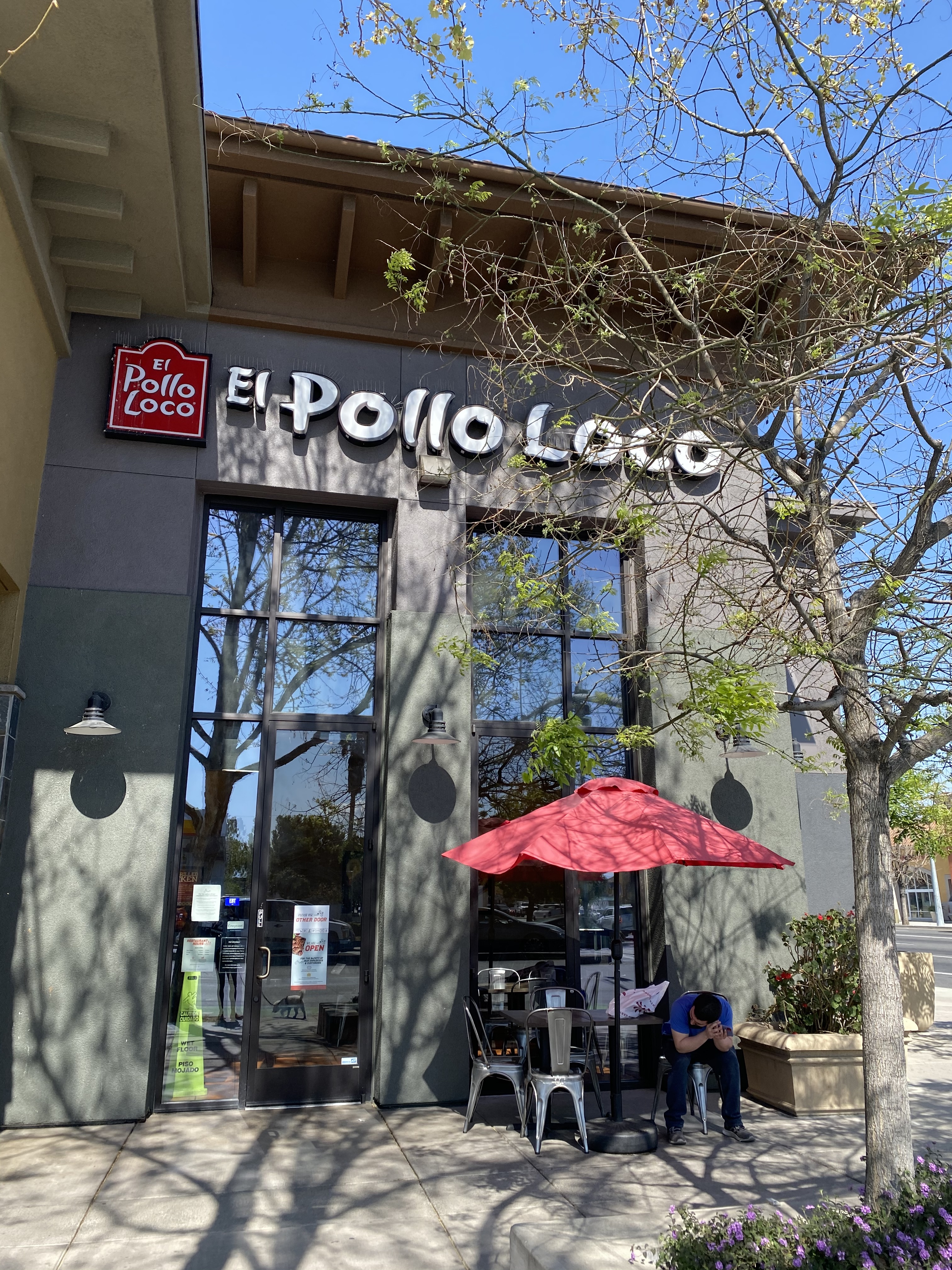
El Pollo Loco in San Jose, California (2021).

Juan Francisco Ochoa started the restaurant in Guasave, Sinaloa, Mexico, in 1975.

By 1979, the chain had expanded throughout northern Mexico. On December 8, 1980, Ochoa opened his first U.S. restaurant in Los Angeles, California, at 503 South Alvarado Street, near west Sixth Street. The first American location was only 1,500 square feet (140 m^{2}) and it grossed more than $125,000 per month during its first year of operation. The initial menu was very simple: a choice of a half or whole chicken with a packet of warm tortillas and a cup of salsa. A second location was opened in Santa Ana in the fall of 1981.

In 1983, the 19 American restaurants in the chain were acquired by Denny's with an agreement that the Ochoa family would continue to operate the restaurants in Mexico under the corporate name El Pollo Loco, S.A. de C.V. where it continues to operate. After 18 months of new ownership, the American owned El Loco Pollo, Inc. had increased the number of locations in Southern California from 19 to 29 while adding 6 locations in distant Houston, Texas, with almost all of the new locations being franchise operations.

Four years later the 70-unit El Pollo Loco was acquired by TW Services when TW Services purchased El Pollo Loco's then parent Denny's Inc. in 1987 for $218 million in cash.

In May 1990, El Pollo Loco opened its 200th restaurant. That new restaurant was located in Yorba Linda, California. During the early 1990s the company experimented with many different concepts to increase marketshare in the competitive Southern Californian fast food industry. In 1994 the company test marketed at a select few locations: a side-dish bar, salsa bar, and barbecue at some locations, while other locations tried selling french fries or ice cream. Only salsa bars survived the test and were introduced chainwide the following year. The company also tested home delivery and catering in 1995.

In August 1995, El Pollo Loco earned a place in the Guinness Book of World Records for building the world's largest burrito in Anaheim, California. The burrito was 3,112 feet (949 m) long and weighed two tons.

In December 1995, John A. Romandetti replaced Raymond J. Perry as president and chief executive officer. Sixteen months later, Romandetti was replaced by Nelson J. Marchioli as president and chief executive officer in April 1997 when Romandetti was transferred to sister company Denny's as its new CEO.

On July 12, 1997, Flagstar, the parent company of El Pollo Loco and Denny's, filed for Chapter 11 bankruptcy.

American Securities Capital Partners acquired the 274-location El Pollo Loco in 1999 for $114 Million from Advantica (formerly called TW Services) and later sold it to Trimaran Capital Partners in 2005 for $400 Million with 328 locations.

In April 2001, Stephen Carley replaced Nelson J. Marchioli as president and chief executive officer. Marchioli left EPL, Inc., to head its former parent company Advantica.

In January 2007, El Pollo Loco was featured on NBC TV's hit show The Apprentice: Los Angeles where contestants competed by creating and selling versions of El Pollo Loco's Pollo Bowl. El Pollo Loco was recognized by the World Franchising Network as a Top Franchise for Hispanics in 2010.

New locations were first open by franchisees in the states of Georgia, Utah, and Oregon in late 2007 and early 2008. The 400th location was opened in Chelsea, Massachusetts in May 2008.

In August 2010, president and chief executive officer Steve Carley unexpectedly resigned to head Red Robin Gourmet Burgers.

In January 2011, Steve Sather was officially named president and chief executive officer after serving since the previous August as acting CEO. The company had to exit Georgia in October 2011 due to bankruptcy of the franchisee and the resulting poor sales performance.

In July 2014, El Loco Pollo (Nasdaq: LOCO) became a publicly traded company on NASDAQ.

In October 2016, the company announced that it had teamed up with a Louisiana-based franchisee who plans to build and open two units in Lafayette, Louisiana, sometime in 2018. In the following year, the Louisiana-based franchisee announced that construction of the first Lafayette was going to start in the upcoming month with an anticipated opening in the late spring of 2018. The first restaurant in Louisiana finally open in Lafayette in March 2018.

In March 2018, Bernard Acoca replaced Steve Sather as president and chief executive officer. Acoca previously served as president of Teavana. In October 2021, Acoca resigned, citing a desire "to pursue other opportunities". In March 2022, El Pollo Loco announced that CFO Larry Roberts, who has been serving as interim CEO since October 2021, was appointed as the company's new president and CEO. COO Maria Hollandsworth assumed the role of interim CEO after Roberts left the company in November 2023. Liz Williams became CEO and director in March 2024, after serving as president of Taco Bell International in 2020. Hollandsworth was also appointed president while remaining COO.

Plans were announced in November 2021 of the opening of several restaurants in the Denver metropolitan area via two different Colorado-based franchises. The first Colorado restaurant opened in Denver in November 2022. At the time of opening, the company had 478 locations in Arizona, California, Nevada, Texas, Utah, and Louisiana, 196 of which were company owned.

El Pollo Loco opened its 500th location in October, 2024 in Colorado Springs, CO. https://investor.elpolloloco.com/news-releases/news-release-details/el-pollo-loco-celebrates-growth-milestone-500th-us-restaurant

== Temporary expansion eastward ==
Throughout its history, El Pollo Loco tried at various times to expand beyond its core territories of California and the American Southwest, but the attempts were not very successful.

In 1987, then owner TW Services began to open restaurants in the Orlando, Florida area, starting in Winter Park. Five restaurants were eventually built but all five were forced to close in 1991.

A second expansion attempt, mainly though franchises, was started in 2006 under then-owner Trimaran Capital Partners. All of these locations were closed within six years.

During this time, El Pollo Loco or its franchisees briefly operated several restaurants in metro Atlanta, and Boston, New Jersey, and in the Hampton Roads area of Virginia; these closed by 2011. The chain's franchised restaurants in the Portland, Oregon metropolitan area also closed in 2011. An El Pollo Loco in the Foxwoods Resort Casino in Connecticut closed in spring 2012. The last of four Chicago area stores closed at the end of 2012.

== Locations in the United States ==
In the U.S., El Pollo Loco operated over 400 company-owned and franchised restaurants in Arizona, California, Colorado, Nevada, Texas, Utah, and Louisiana in 2017. In 2012, El Pollo Loco restaurants went through a major makeover.

== Locations outside North America ==
Under Denny's and its successors, El Pollo Loco, Inc., had sold franchise licenses to operators based in East Asia.

In 1987, TW Services made a deal with the major Japanese trading company Mitsui & Co. to open 484 restaurants across Japan, at the same time that Taco Time and Taco Bell were opening their first locations in the country. The first of these opened in Tokyo in 1988. All of the Japanese locations closed by 1994.

By 1997, EPL, Inc., had franchises located in Malaysia, Singapore, and the Philippines. The franchise licenses for both Malaysia and Singapore has since lapsed.

=== Philippines ===
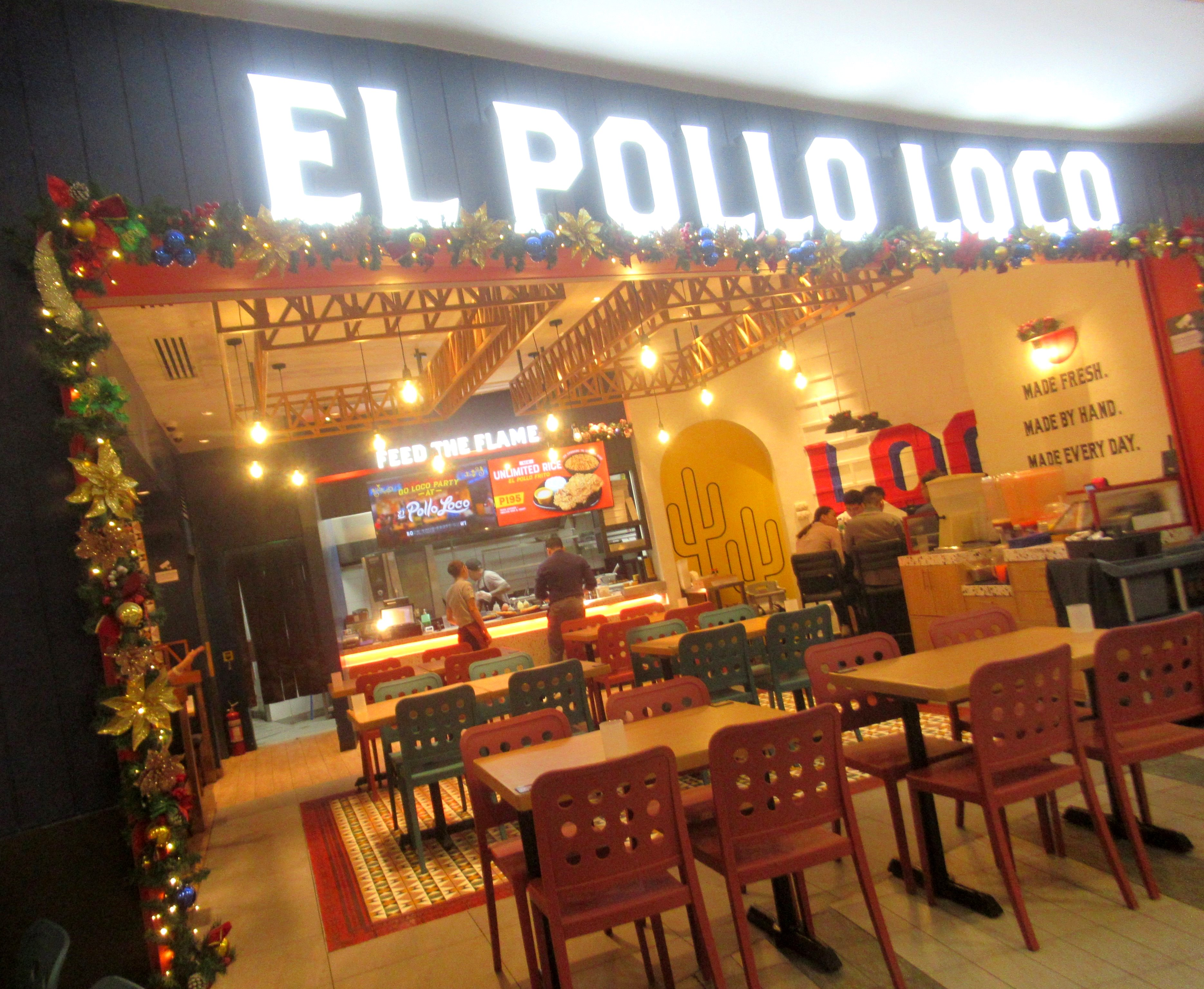
A Filipino restaurant in Quezon City (2025).

The first location in the Philippines was opened at the SM Megamall in Mandaluyong City in 1991. In July 2016, the Delgado family, owners of the El Pollo Loco franchise in the Philippines, filed a lawsuit against EPL, Inc. in the Regional Trial Court so it could retain the El Pollo Loco trademark in that country after the franchise contract had been terminated. In the following year, The Bistro Group acquired the brand with its two locations, in the SM Megamall and in the SM Mall of Asia, in July 2017.

By June 2023, El Pollo Loco Philippines, as a subsidiary of The Bistro Group, had ten locations within the Manila metropolitan area. Unlike its legally-unrelated Mexican and American counterparts, the Filipino company also offers barbecue pork ribs, macaroni salad, dessert crepes, flan, beer, rice bowls (beef, pork, or chicken), and endless Spanish rice. One reviewer wrote that the menu has been modified to satisfy the Filipino palate and meals run in the 300-500 Philippines peso range. Filipino-style spaghetti was added to the menu in February 2025 and unlimited margaritas for a fixed fee was added to the menu in April 2025.

As of January 2025, the Bistro Group had 11 El Pollo Loco branches in the Manila Metro area, all of which appear to be located in shopping malls.

== Charity partners ==
The brand created Fire-Grilled Fundraisers, an initiative for nonprofit organizations to raise funds for their cause while dining at the restaurant. They also created El Pollo Loco Charities, a nonprofit 501(c) charity to provide meals to underprivileged families, in 2005.

In 2019, the brand launched Pollo with Purpose, a company-wide food donation program, in partnership with Food Donation Connection. The program's stated goal was to donate 500,000 pounds of food annually.

== See also ==
- List of fast-food chicken restaurants
