= Terry Wahls =

American physician and writer

- Born: November 9, 1955 (age 70)
- Occupations: Physician, writer

Terry Lynn Wahls (born November 9, 1955) is an American physician and paleo diet advocate. She was an assistant chief of staff at Iowa City Veterans Administration Health Care and is a clinical professor of medicine at the University of Iowa. She also has a private practice and conducts clinical trials. She has a chronic progressive neurological disorder and secondary progressive multiple sclerosis. Wahls is a promoter of functional medicine, and a diet claimed, with no good evidence, to treat multiple sclerosis.

== Professional positions ==
In 2000 Wahls moved to Iowa City, Iowa, to become the associate chief of staff for ambulatory care at the Veterans Administration (VA) Iowa City Medical Center and associate professor of medicine in the college of medicine at the University of Iowa. In that same year, Wahls was diagnosed with relapsing remitting multiple sclerosis (MS) that progressed to a stage where she was using a wheelchair and on the verge of being unable to continue practicing medicine.

Terry and her partner, Jackie Reger, have two children, Zach and Zebby.

== The Wahls Protocol Diet ==
Wahls advocates a low-carbohydrate paleo diet. The diet promoted by Wahls to treat MS is a modified paleo diet, relying primarily on grass-fed meat, fish, leafy vegetables, roots, nuts, and fruit and restricting dairy products, eggs, grains, legumes, nightshade (solanaceous) vegetables, starches and sugar. Wahls has claimed that the diet alleviated the symptoms of her own multiple sclerosis.

Wahls' promotion of her diet and lifestyle regimen have been criticized for relying too much on anecdotal evidence, for not having adequate research to verify the claims, and for Wahls' perceived conflicts of interest (selling numerous products and educational materials related to her protocol). A 2020 Cochrane review found no research supporting efficacy or effectiveness of diet or vitamin supplementation for treatment of MS.

Clinical neurologist Steven Novella has commented that Wahls' view is "at drastic odds with the evidence" and elevates "nutrition to a magical stature that is not based on a lick of published evidence".

== Selected publications ==
- The Wahls Protocol: How I Beat Progressive MS Using Paleo Principles and Functional Medicine (2014)
- The Wahls Protocol Cooking for Life: The Revolutionary Modern Paleo Plan to Treat All Chronic Autoimmune Conditions (2017)
