= Trans World Corporation =

Original holding company owning Trans World Airlines

- Type: Public
- Industry: Airline holding company, conglomerate
- Founded: 1979
- Defunct: 1986
- Fate: Liquidated
- Successor: TW Services
- Headquarters: New York City, United States
- Area served: United States, international
- Key people: L. Edwin Smart (CEO)

Trans World Corporation was the original name of the holding company set up to own Trans World Airlines.

== History ==
In 1967, when the airline sought to diversify into other areas of business, a key investment was Hilton International Hotels, the non-American interests of the Hilton Hotels chain. (Because of this split, the Hilton International chain had to call its hotels in America Vista, while future overseas locations of the American Hilton chain were called Conrad International. This operation was later sold by Trans World Corporation while under the leadership of Charles C. Tillinghast Jr. the CEO of TWA and the first known to receive a golden parachute employment contract.

In 1979, Trans World Corporation was created as a holding company for Trans World Airlines, the Hilton International hotel business, Canteen Corporation, and later Century 21 Real Estate and Spartan Food Systems, a Hardee's franchisee.

In 1983, Trans World Corporation, under Chief Executive Officer L. Edwin Smart, spun off Trans World Airlines to Carl C. Icahn.

At the time of TWA's spinoff, TWC owned Spartan Food Systems Inc., the Canteen Corporation, Hilton International, and Century 21 Real Estate Corporation. The company sold Century 21 Real Estate to the Metropolitan Life Insurance Company in 1985, and the Hilton International hotel chain to UAL, Inc., parent company of United Airlines, in 1986.

== Trans World Airlines Worldwide ==
As a result of both Trans World Airlines and Trans World Corporation being publicly traded prior to the spinoff, public records permitted analysis which indicates that "wealth transfer" of a sale of TWA was as much a reason for the sale of TWA as was a desirability to "restructure union contracts". Conversely, it was circa 1982-1984 when UAL Corporation and AMR Corporation, the parent companies of United Airlines and American Airlines first took shape. This period is also an era marked by extremely competitive airline industry forces fighting for deregulation survival along with fighting for opportunities of vast individual creations of wealth characterized by those accumulated by leading industry figures such as Frank Lorenzo and Carl Icahn during the 1980s.

In 1986, TWC was liquidated. TW Services was formed at end of 1986 upon the dissolution of Transworld Corp. L. Edwin Smart remained head of TW Services Inc., the successor of Trans World Corporation which remained headquartered in the same building and shared many directors as Trans World Corporation. TW Services Inc. continued the use of the TW ticker symbol on the NYSE. Its business centered on food services and retirement care. In 1987, TW Services bought Denny's and with it El Pollo Loco.

TW Services was the target of several hostile take over attempts which ended in June 1989 when TW Services agreed to be taken over by Conniston Partners for $1.65 billion. As part of the buy out, TW Services moved its headquarters from New York City to Spartanburg, South Carolina. The company divested its American Medical Services unit to HostMasters in 1991.

== Flagstar Companies ==
In 1992, private equity firm, Kohlberg Kravis Roberts acquired a 47% interest in TW Corporation, later known as The Flagstar Companies, and encouraged the company to sell non-core businesses. The following year, TW Services changed its name to The Flagstar Companies in its bid to focus on the food service industry with a portfolio of businesses including Volume Services America, Hardee's, Quincy's Family Steakhouse, El Pollo Loco, Canteen Corporation and Denny's.

After accumulating $2.2 billion in debt, Flagstar filed for Chapter 11 bankruptcy protection from its creditors in a Federal bankruptcy court in South Carolina in July 1997. Six months later, Flagstar emerged from bankruptcy as Advantica Restaurant Group Inc. and with three-fourths of its stock controlled by four of the former Flagstar's senior creditors. At the time of emergence, Advantica owned Denny's, Carrows, Coco's, El Pollo Loco and Quincy's Family Steakhouse and was the largest franchisee of Hardee's restaurants. Advantica paid off its inherited debt by selling off most of its holdings.

In November 1999, Advantica sold El Pollo Loco to an investment firm for $114 Million plus the assumption of $14 million in debt.

Today the remnants of the corporation are Denny's.

Trans World Corporation was the predecessor of the way and manner in which many of the airlines with holdings and holding parent companies conduct and create their business structural organization.

== See also ==
- Transamerica Corporation, one of the first conglomerates, created as the parent of Bank of America and other financial interests, was perceived as an airline company before it bought and sold one.
