= Century 21 Real Estate =

American real estate agent franchise company

Century 21 Real Estate LLC
- Type: Subsidiary
- Industry: Real estate Franchising
- Founded: 1971; 55 years ago, in California, U.S.
- Founders: Art Bartlett; Marsh Fisher; George Sofokleous
- Headquarters: Madison, New Jersey, U.S.
- Number of locations: 86 countries and territories
- Key people: Michael Miedler (president and CEO)
- Number of employees: 147,000
- Parent: Compass, Inc.
- Website: www.century21.com

Century 21 Real Estate LLC is an American real estate agent franchise company founded in 1971. The system consists of approximately 14,000 independently owned and operated franchised broker offices in 86 countries and territories worldwide with over 147,000 sales professionals. Century 21 Real Estate is headquartered in Madison, New Jersey and is a division of Compass, Inc.

== History ==
Century 21 Real Estate (Century 21) was founded in 1971 by two real estate agents, Art Bartlett and Marsh Fisher, in Orange County, California.

Bartlett reveals how they decided on the name:

We were brainstorming at lunch one day – my former VP and I – and I said the name had to sound like it had been around for a long time. [...] My former VP suggested 20th Century Realty. I thought it would be impossible to get the name registered. He said 21st Realty, but I didn't like that. He then said, "How about Century 21?" I liked it, though it sounded futuristic. [...] I called Marsh and told him, but he thought it was too futuristic. He wanted Green Valley. Well, we finally agreed on Century 21, and we incorporated the company.

— Art Bartlett

Logo from 1971 to 1991

Logo from 1991 to 2007 (primary), and 2007 to 2018 (secondary)

Logo from 2007 to 2018

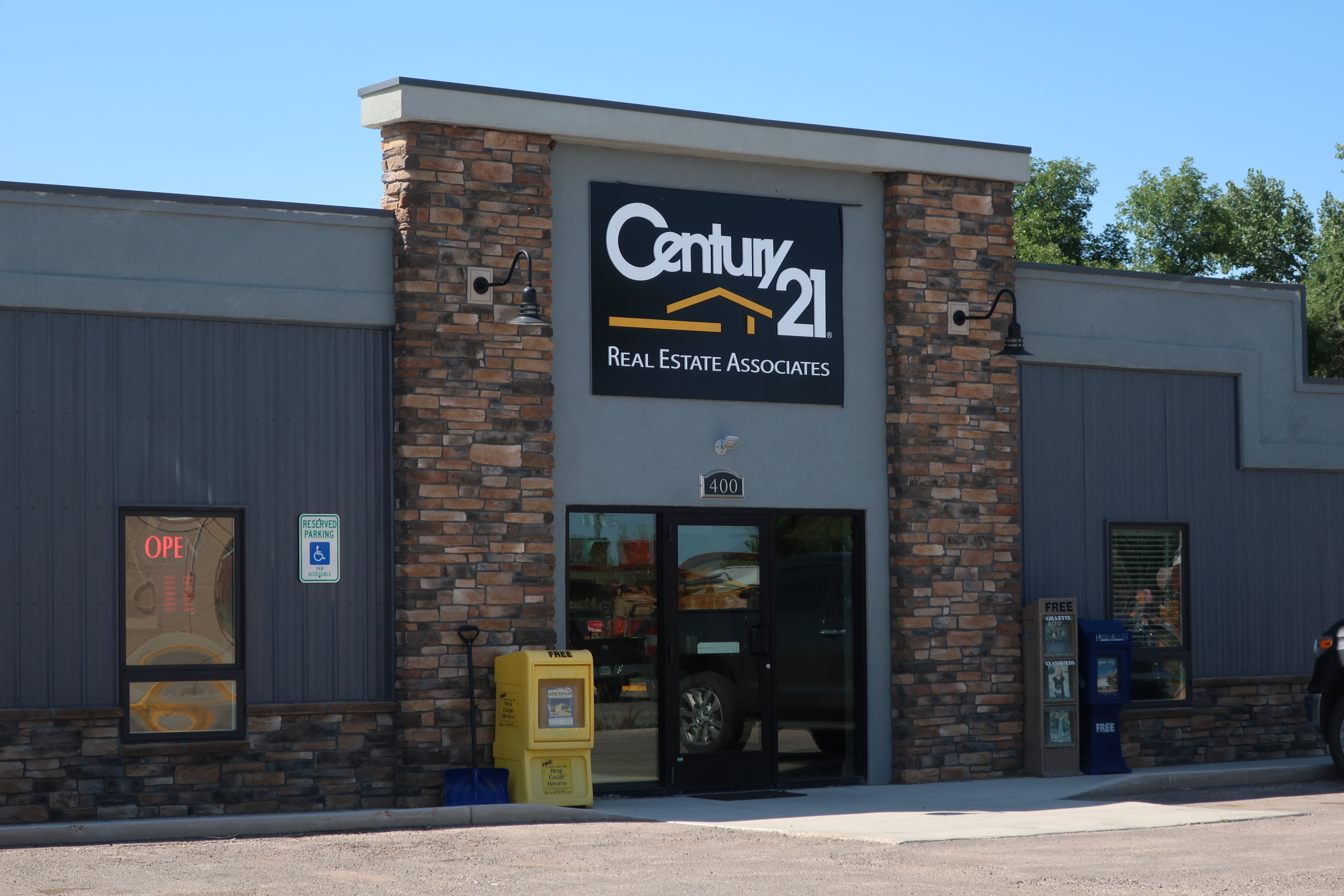
A Century 21 Real Estate office in Gillette, Wyoming

Century 21 was acquired by Trans World Corporation in 1979, when Trans World Corporation decided to focus on hospitality and housing. In 1985, MetLife acquired Century 21 from Trans World Corporation. When MetLife decided to leave the housing business, Century 21 was sold to Hospitality Franchise Systems (later Cendant) in 1995. When Cendant split in 2006, Century 21 became part of Realogy, now Anywhere Real Estate.

CENTURY 21 "Gold Seal" logo introduced in 2018

=== The Joy of Home Campaign ===
In November 2024, Century 21 Real Estate launched The Joy of Home, a global marketing campaign. Century 21 cited shifts in consumer decision making towards community and connection as motivators behind the campaign, which features "more humanized" messaging and visual media.

== Legal cases ==
In 2019, Century 21's parent company Realogy was named as a co-conspirator in multiple class-action lawsuits alleging that it artificially inflated commissions paid by home sellers. In September 2023, it agreed to pay $83.5 million to settle two of the lawsuits. One of the cases, Burnett v. National Association of Realtors, went to trial the following month, where a federal jury found that the parent company did participate in the commissions conspiracy. The settlement agreement removed the requirement for Century 21 real estate agents to belong to the National Association of Realtors.

== See also ==
- Real estate broker
- Real estate trends
