= Zach Wahls =

American politician (born 1991)

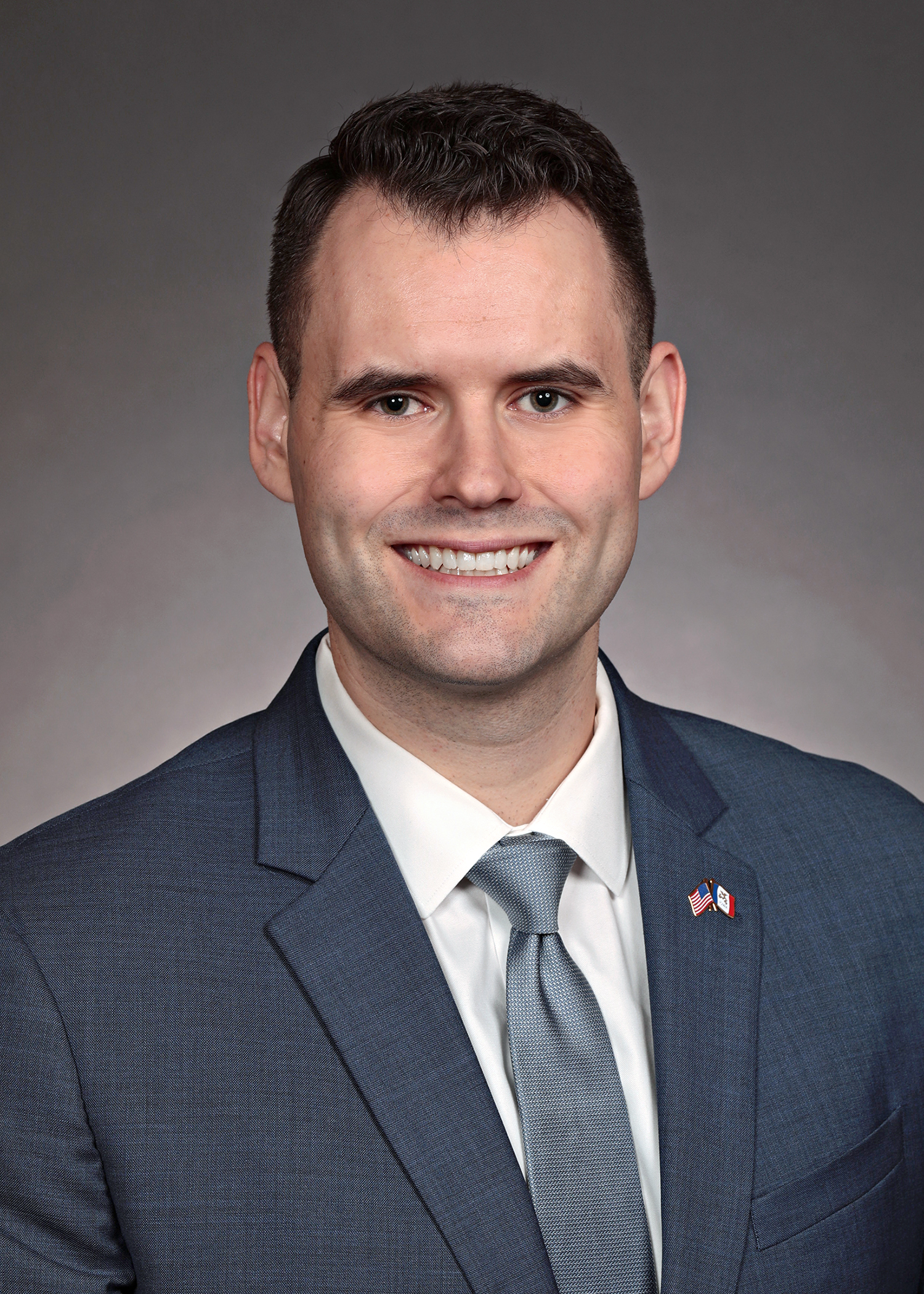
- Official portrait, 2023

Minority Leader of the Iowa Senate
- In office November 15, 2020 – June 7, 2023
- Preceded by: Janet Petersen
- Succeeded by: Pam Jochum

Member of the Iowa Senate
- Incumbent
- Assumed office January 14, 2019
- Preceded by: Robert Dvorsky
- Constituency: 37th district (2019–2023); 43rd district (2023–present)

Personal details
- Born: Zacharia Wahls; July 15, 1991 (age 34) Marshfield, Wisconsin, U.S.
- Party: Democratic
- Spouse: Chloe Angyal (m. 2021)
- Relatives: Terry Wahls (mother)
- Education: University of Iowa (BA); Princeton University (MPA)
- Website: https://zachwahls.com

Zacharia Wahls (born July 15, 1991) is an American politician and Democratic member of the Iowa Senate. First elected in 2019, he represents the 43rd district. Wahls was elected Minority Leader of the Iowa Senate from 2020 through 2023, though resigned over leadership staff disputes.

Wahls is the son of two lesbians, which significantly contributed to his LGBTQ+ activism involvement as an adult.

== Early years ==
Zach Wahls is the son of two lesbian women and was conceived using artificial insemination. He was born on July 15, 1991, to his biological mother Terry Wahls, an internal medicine physician. He has a younger sister who shares the same sperm donor and parents. Terry met Jackie Reger in 1995 and the two held a commitment ceremony in 1996. Zach spent his childhood in Marshfield, Wisconsin, and moved when he was nine years old to Iowa City, Iowa. He was raised as a Unitarian Universalist and identifies himself as a member of that church.

He has said that having lesbian parents caused occasional problems during his school years when he found it difficult to explain to his peers or found that some of them were forbidden to socialize with him. He was sometimes teased and sometimes bullied because of his parents' relationship. In 2004, as an eighth grader (aged 12/13) and while watching the Republican National Convention on television, he first realized that there was political opposition to the sort of family in which he was raised. In high school, he wrote a series of columns for the school newspaper about being raised by a lesbian couple. He played quarterback on the football team and participated in speech and debate. He graduated from Iowa City West High School in 2009. He entered the University of Iowa that fall, withdrawing shortly thereafter to promote his book, written with the assistance of Bruce Littlefield.

While still a high school senior, following the Iowa Supreme Court decision in Varnum v. Brien that invalidated the state's ban on same-sex marriage, he wrote an op-ed piece in The Des Moines Register in which he advocated a complete separation of marriage from civil unions, calling for legislation "to completely remove government from the marriage process altogether, leaving a religious ceremony to religious institutions, and mak[ing] civil unions, accessible by any two people, including those of the same sex, the norm for legal benefits".

His mothers married in 2009 following the legalization of same-sex marriage in Iowa.

Before withdrawing from the University of Iowa, while a college freshman, Wahls started a small peer tutoring company, Iowa City Learns, that offers tutoring services to junior and high school students. At the University of Iowa he was a member of The National Society of Collegiate Scholars (NSCS). He also wrote a weekly column for The Daily Iowan, a daily student newspaper, and studied for a time in India.

He was, in his own words, "not much of an activist" before he went viral in 2011.

== Activism ==
On January 31, 2011, Wahls addressed the Iowa House Judiciary Committee in a public hearing on a proposed constitutional amendment to ban gay marriage in Iowa. A video of his testimony posted on YouTube went viral. It had more than 1.5 million views within two weeks and exceeded 15 million views by April 2012. The Economist described the hearing as "ineffectual conservative political theatre" and noted that "whatever it was Iowa House Republicans were trying to achieve, it certainly wasn't to offer a soapbox to Zach Wahls, a 19-year-old engineering student at the University of Iowa." It introduced the video of Wahls's testimony with the words "This is what it looks like to win an argument."

Asked to assess his role in LGBT activism, he said in April 2011: "We've been having this conversation for almost 20 years and the actors are all kinda stale. The kids of gay families bring a new face and a new argument to the table." Though he emphasizes the change in support for LGBT equality from one generation to the next, he has described the problematic attitudes of his peers: "Even my best friends that know and love my parents still toss around 'faggot' and 'gay' like it's not really a big deal. In some ways my generation is real accepting, but we still have this casual homophobia, racism and sexism." On another occasion in May 2012, he explained his identification with the LGBT community:

To be clear, I don't consider myself an ally. I might be [a] straight cisgender man, but in my mind, I am a member of the LGBT community. I know the last thing that anyone wants is to add another letter to the acronym, but we need to make sure as a movement we're making a place for what we call "queer-spawn" to function and to be part of the community. Because even though I'm not gay, I do know what it's like to be hated for who I am. And I do know what it's like to be in the closet, and like every other member of the LGBT community, I did not have a choice in this. I was born into this movement.

Wahls withdrew from the University of Iowa in the fall of 2011, turning his focus to writing a book with Bruce Littlefield, and promoting said book. His book, My Two Moms: Lessons of Love, Strength, and What Makes a Family, published in April 2012, describes the mundane impact of growing up in a household headed by two lesbians, like learning to tie a necktie from Playboy. He has served as co-chair for "The Outspoken Generation", the Family Equality Council's national youth advocacy initiative involving the young adult children of LGBT parents. The Unitarian Universalist Association of Iowa City gave him its Courage of Love Award in April 2012.

Officials at Canisius College twice canceled appearances by Wahls, one sponsored by the school's gay-straight alliance in April 2012 and another sponsored by the College Democrats in March 2013. He spoke there in April 2013 under the auspices of several academic departments, beginning his remarks by reading a statement on Catholic teaching on marriage and parenting as required by the school administration.

In May 2012, he led a group of advocates for LGBT causes in lobbying Congress in support of several pieces of legislation, including the Healthy Families Act, which would allow same-sex partners the same hospital visitation rights as married different-sex couples, and met with Iowa U.S. Sen. Chuck Grassley.

An Eagle Scout, Wahls targeted the Boy Scouts of America's (BSA) ban on gays and lesbians as scout leaders. On May 30, 2012, at the Boy Scouts' National Annual Meeting in Orlando, Florida, wearing his Boy Scout uniform, he delivered petitions with 275,000 signatures in support of equality in scouts. Jennifer Tyrrell, from Bridgeport, Ohio, who was forced to resign as a den mother because she is a lesbian, then met with two of the organization's board members. He told MSNBC's Thomas Roberts that the signatures included many current and former scouts and scout leaders because "there is tremendous support within the boy scout movement already to change this policy and bring it up to date in the 21st century." He reported that his own mothers had no problem when they participated in his boy scout activities, and even when one of his mothers became a den mother and the other served as interim pack leader. In June, as co-founder of the initiative, he launched Scouts for Equality to lobby for a change in the BSA's policies. The organization was dissolved on December 31, 2020, by the Board of Directors' unanimous vote after achieving its goals.

In September, Wahls delivered a speech at the 2012 Democratic National Convention in which he thanked President Obama for "put[ting] his political future on the line" in supporting same-sex marriage.

Wahls completed his degree at the University of Iowa in May 2016 and enrolled in the Princeton School of Public and International Affairs at Princeton University. He was a delegate for Hillary Clinton at the 2016 Democratic National Convention.

== Iowa Senate ==
Wahls announced on December 21, 2017, that he would run in the 2018 election for Iowa Senate district 37. A member of the Democratic Party, Wahls stated that he would focus on the issues of healthcare, education, and workers' rights. Wahls traveled between New Jersey and Iowa City during his Iowa Senate campaign, changing his residence from Iowa City to Coralville immediately prior to announcing his bid for the Iowa Senate. He received his master's degree in public affairs from Princeton on June 5, 2018 – the same day he won the primary election. He won the general election on November 6 and was sworn in on January 14, 2019.

Wahls was elected by his Democratic colleagues to be Senate minority leader for the 2021 session after Janet Petersen retired as leader. He stepped down as Senate Minority Leader on June 7, 2023, following disagreement with Senate Democratic colleagues over firing two long-time Iowa Senate Democratic staff members.

== 2026 U.S. Senate campaign ==
On June 11, 2025, Wahls declared his candidacy for the United States Senate seat currently held by two-term senator Joni Ernst. Wahls lost the primary, held on June 3, to state representative Josh Turek.

== Personal life ==
In 2019, Wahls announced his engagement to journalist Chloe Angyal. Angyal wrote an article in 2011 for the blog Feministing entitled "Marry Me, Zach Wahls" which led to the two meeting and later starting a relationship. The couple married in 2021 and their son was born in 2024.

== Notes ==
Iowa Senate
Preceded by Janet Petersen	Minority Leader of the Iowa Senate; 2021–2023	Succeeded by Pam Jochum
