= Compass, Inc. =

American residential real estate broker

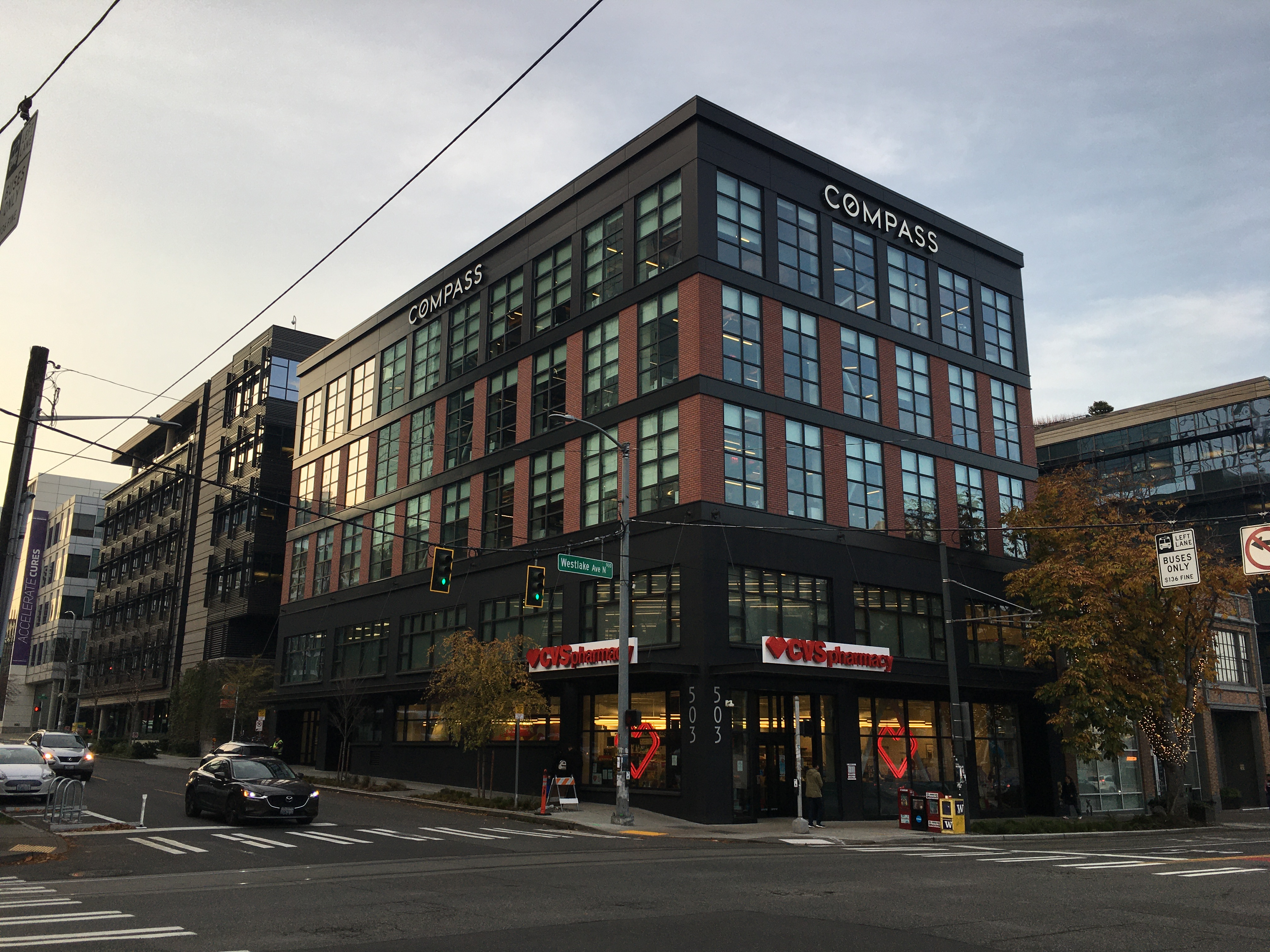
- Engineering Hub in Seattle
- Formerly: Urban Compass, Inc. (2012–2021)
- Type: Public
- Traded as: NYSE: COMP
- Industry: Real estate
- Founded: October 4, 2012; 14 years ago
- Founders: Ori Allon; Robert Reffkin; Avi Dorfman
- Headquarters: New York City, US
- Area served: United States
- Key people: Robert Reffkin (chairman and CEO); Kalani Reelitz (CFO)
- Services: Broker
- Revenue: ▲US$6.961 billion (2025)
- Operating income: ▲US$−63 million (2025)
- Net income: ▲US$−58 million (2025)
- Total assets: ▲US$1.539 billion (2025)
- Total equity: ▲US$787 million (2025)
- Owner: SoftBank Vision Fund (11.4%); Robert Reffkin (2.1%)
- Number of employees: Over 10,000 (2026)
- Website: compass.com

Compass, Inc. provides residential real estate brokerage and related services in the United States. Including its franchised businesses, it has approximately 340,000 agents and associates, who are generally independent contractors, on its platform. It operates under many brand names including Compass, @properties, Better Homes and Gardens Real Estate, Century 21 Real Estate, Coldwell Banker, Corcoran Group, ERA Real Estate, Sotheby's International Realty, and Christie's International Real Estate.

== History ==
Compass was founded by Ori Allon, Robert Reffkin, and Avi Dorfman as Urban Compass, Inc. in New York City in October 2012. Allon was a Director of Engineering at Twitter, and previously founded companies acquired by Twitter and Google. Reffkin had previously served as the chief of staff to the president of Goldman Sachs and worked in the White House. Avi Dorfman had previously worked at McKinsey & Company and Lehman Brothers, and founded a startup.

The company raised $8 million of seed funding. The initial business model employed full-time, salaried brokers and was focused only on rentals. The service was launched in May 2013.

In January 2014, Compass announced it would change its overall business model by contracting independent real estate agents, receiving a portion of the broker commission.

In July 2014, Compass signed a lease on 25,000 square feet of office space at 90 5th Avenue, which became its global headquarters.

In June 2014, Leonard Steinberg, previously with Douglas Elliman, was named president of the company. At that time, the company had 125 agents and 70 staff members.

In July 2016, the company launched a mobile app.

The company expanded into several markets, both organically and via acquisitions. By January 2017, the company operated in 9 U.S. markets: New York, Boston, San Francisco, Miami, Washington, the Hamptons, Los Angeles, Santa Barbara, and Aspen. At that time, it had 1,300 agents.

On April 1, 2021, the company became a public company via an initial public offering.

In November 2021, Compass settled with Avi Dorfman, ending an 8-year dispute, and acknowledging him as a member of the founding team. The company took a $21.3 million charge in connection with the matter.

The company announced several rounds of layoffs in 2022 and 2023.

In June 2025, Compass sued Zillow for violation of federal antitrust laws with its policy that any home that was put on the market but not available for listing on Zillow within 24 hours would be banned from its site. In September 2025, Compass announced the acquisition of Anywhere Real Estate, with the acquisition in turn providing Compass a variety of Anywhere's real estate subsidiary brands to the Compass family of companies, as well as the relocation service company Cartus. The real estate brands transferred in the sale included Century 21, Sotheby’s International Real Estate, Coldwell Banker and Corcoran. With the September 2025 transaction, Compass become the largest real estate brokerage in the world, based on its subsidiaries and Compass itself.

=== Acquisitions ===
Date	Acquired	Description	Source
November 2014	Lindsay Reishman Real Estate	Washington, D.C.–based broker	
April 2016	Shane Aspen Real Estate	Aspen-based broker	
January 2017	Bushari Real Estate	Boston-based brokerage	
April 2018	Conlon	Chicago-based brokerage	
April 2018	Northwest Group Real Estate	Seattle-based brokerage	
June 2018	The Hudson Company	Chicago-based brokerage	
July 2018	Paragon Real Estate Group	San Francisco–based brokerage	
August 2018	Avenue Properties	Seattle-based brokerage	
August 2018	Pacific Union International	San Francisco–based brokerage	
November 2018	Wydler Brothers	Washington, D.C.–based brokerage	
February 2019	Contactually	CRM provider; shut down in March 2022	
March 2019	Alain Pinel Realtors	San Francisco–based brokerage	
April 2019	Stribling & Associates	New York–based brokerage	
November 2019	Detectica	AI Startup	
October 2020	Modus	Home closing startup, shut down in June 2022	
February 2021	KVS Title	Title insurance and settlement services provider	
April 2021	Glide Labs	Transaction management platform	
September 2021	First Alliance Title	Title insurance and settlement services provider	
September 2021	CommonGround Abstract	Title insurance and settlement services provider	
May 2022	Consumer's Title Company	Title insurance and settlement services provider	
April 2023	Launch Real Estate	Arizona-based brokerage	
September 2023	Deasy Penner Podley/DPP	Pasadena-based luxury boutique brokerage	
September 2023	Realty Austin and Realty San Antonio	Texas-based brokerages	
January 2024	Attorneys Key Title	Fort Lauderdale–based title company	
April 2024	Latter & Blum	Broker operating in Louisiana and Mississippi	
May 2024	Parks Real Estate	Broker operating in Tennessee	
December 2024	Christie's International Real Estate	Brokerage brand; price was $150 million in cash and $294 million in Compass stock	
February 2025	Washington Fine Properties	Broker operating in Washington, D.C.	
July 2025	PorchLight Real Estate Group	Broker operating in Colorado	
July 2025	Cottingham Chalk	Brokerage based in Charlotte, NC	
January 2026	Anywhere Real Estate	Brokerage operating under the names Better Homes and Gardens Real Estate, Century 21 Real Estate, Coldwell Banker, Corcoran Group, and Sotheby's International Realty, as well as owning the relocation company Cartus as well.	
