= Corcoran Group =

American real estate brokerage

The Corcoran Group, Inc.
- Company type: Subsidiary
- Industry: Real estate brokerage firm
- Founded: 1973; 53 years ago
- Founders: Barbara Corcoran
- Headquarters: New York City
- Parent: Compass, Inc.
- Website: www.corcoran.com

The Corcoran Group is an American real estate brokerage firm and a division of Compass, Inc.

== History ==
Barbara Corcoran, a former diner waitress, founded the company in 1973 with a $1,000 loan. In 2001, she sold the company to NRT for $66 million.

In 2002, the company brokered $4.2 billion worth of real estate. In 2004, Corcoran Group acquired McCann Coyner Clarke, which in the prior year had registered $310 million in closed sales volume.

In 2022, the company was the second largest broker of residential real estate in the East Village and the Lower East Side, selling $210 million in volume in 112 transactions in those neighborhoods.
