= Anywhere Real Estate =

American real estate company

Anywhere Real Estate Inc.
- Type: Subsidiary
- Traded as: NYSE: HOUS
- Industry: Real estate; Franchising
- Founded: 2006; 20 years ago
- Defunct: January 9, 2026; 6 months ago
- Fate: Acquired by Compass, Inc.
- Headquarters: Madison, New Jersey, U.S.
- Area served: Global
- Key people: Ryan Schneider (CEO); Michael J. Williams (chairman)
- Products: Real estate services
- Revenue: ▲US$5.69 billion (2024)
- Operating income: ▲US$10 million (2024)
- Net income: ▼US$−128 million (2024)
- Total assets: ▼US$5.64 billion (2024)
- Total equity: ▼US$1.57 billion (2024)
- Number of employees: 7,890 (2025)
- Subsidiaries: Anywhere Advisors; Anywhere Brands; Anywhere Integrated Services; Better Homes and Gardens Real Estate; Cartus; Century 21; Coldwell Banker; Corcoran Group; ERA Real Estate; Sotheby's International Realty
- Website: anywhere.re

Anywhere Real Estate Inc., formerly Realogy (/ˈriːlədʒi/), was an American real estate services firm. It operated and franchised real estate brands that provided brokerage, relocation, title, insurance, and settlement services. Brands included Better Homes and Gardens Real Estate, Century 21 Real Estate, Coldwell Banker, Corcoran Group, ERA Real Estate and Sotheby's International Realty. In 2026, the company was acquired by Compass, Inc.

In 2025, it had over 300,000 independent sales agents, with approximately 18,000 offices in 119 countries, including 5,300 brokerage offices in the U.S.

== History ==
In July 2006, Cendant completed the corporate spin-off of the company to Cendant shareholders. In April 2007, Apollo Global Management acquired the company for an enterprise value of $8.5 billion.

In October 2012, Realogy became a public company via an initial public offering on the New York Stock Exchange, raising US$1.08 billion.The following year, it moved its head office from Parsippany-Troy Hills, New Jersey to Madison, New Jersey.

Ryan Schneider succeeded Richard A. Smith as chief executive officer in 2017. Effective June 2022, the firm changed its name to Anywhere Real Estate.

In January 2026, the company was acquired by Compass, Inc. for $1.6 billion in stock.

== Legal issues ==
In 2024, Anywhere agreed to pay $83.5 million and change its brokerage practices to resolve claims that its policies led to inflated buyer-broker commissions.
