= Sotheby's International Realty =

Luxury real estate brand

- Type: Subsidiary
- Industry: Real estate
- Founded: 1976; 50 years ago
- Area served: Global
- Key people: Philip A. White (president & CEO)
- Services: Brokerage firm for luxury homes
- Parent: Compass, Inc.
- Website: www.sothebysrealty.com

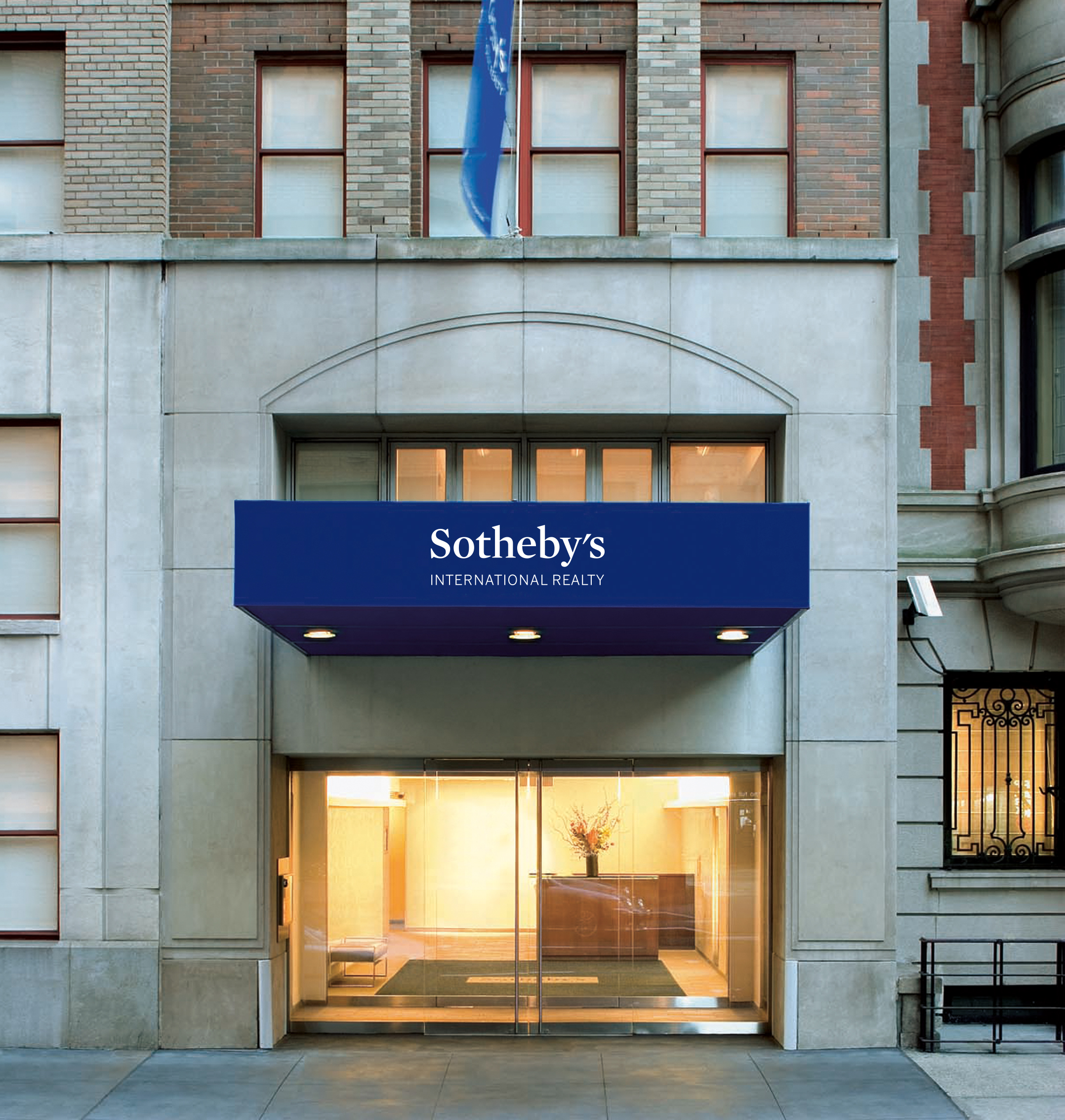
New York City Office, Sotheby's International Realty - East Side Manhattan Brokerage

Sotheby's International Realty is a luxury real estate brokerage firm. It was founded in 1976 by Sotheby's fine art dealers. Sotheby's International Realty operates as a franchise focusing on brokering and marketing of residential real estate.

As of 2025, the Sotheby's International Realty network had more than 26,000 sales associates in 1,100 offices in 84 countries and territories worldwide.

== History ==
In February 2004, Sotheby's entered into a long-term strategic alliance with Realogy Holdings that provided for the licensing of the Sotheby’s International Realty name and the development of a full franchise system. Franchises in the system are granted to brokerages and individuals meeting Realogy's qualifications. The franchisor supports its agents with operational, marketing, recruiting, educational, and business development resources. In 2012, the company launched a website for farm and ranch listings, the first in a series of specialty market Internet listings. Subsequently focused marketing websites include waterfront, golf, ski, and historic properties.

In 2020, it opened offices in Porto and Montenegro.

== Reside magazine ==
The company publishes Reside, a semi-annual real estate and lifestyle magazine, which won the Hermes Platinum Award for creative excellence and outstanding design and editorial in 2009.

== See also ==
- Real estate
- Real estate agent
- Real estate broker
