= Coldwell Banker =

American real estate brand

- Formerly: Sears Financial Network (1981–1993)
- Type: Subsidiary
- Industry: Real estate Franchising
- Founded: August 27, 1906; 119 years ago, in San Francisco, California
- Founders: Colbert Coldwell, Albert Nion Tucker, John Conant Lynch
- Headquarters: Madison, New Jersey, United States
- Key people: Kamini Lane (president & CEO); Coldwell Banker Realty (corporate owned business) Jason Waugh (president, Coldwell Banker Affiliates (franchise business)
- Parent: Compass, Inc.
- Website: coldwellbanker.com

Coldwell Banker LLC is an American real estate franchise owned by Compass, Inc., with headquarters in Madison, New Jersey. It was founded in 1906 in San Francisco, and has approximately 3000 offices in 49 countries and territories. It publishes an annual house price guide, Home Listing Report. The company is not a bank; its name refers instead to a former managing partner.

== History ==
After the 1906 San Francisco earthquake and fires, Albert Nion Tucker, Colbert Coldwell and John Conant Lynch formed Tucker, Lynch and Coldwell on August 27, 1906. Benjamin Arthur Banker joined the firm as a salesman in 1913, and became a partner in 1914. The company changed its name to Coldwell, Kern & Banker in 1918. In 1919 the name became Coldwell, Kern, Cornwall & Banker, and in 1920, Coldwell Cornwall & Banker. Cornwall retired in 1940, and the company name changed again to Coldwell, Banker & Company, which was shortened to Coldwell Banker in 1974. Banker and Coldwell remained active in the company throughout their lives.

In 1920, Coldwell Banker moved to a three-story building in San Francisco. It opened an office in Phoenix, Arizona, its first outside California, in 1952. In the 1970s the company expanded by acquiring firms in Atlanta, Chicago, and Washington, D.C. The first international Coldwell Banker office opened in Toronto, Canada in 1996.

Coldwell Banker & Company became a corporation in 1961, and went public in 1968. In 1981 it was bought by Sears, Roebuck, and became part of the Sears Financial Network. In 1989, Sears sold Coldwell Banker's commercial unit to a management-led buyout group including The Carlyle Group for approximately $300 million. As part of the sale, the residential unit retained the Coldwell Banker name; the commercial group has changed names several times after the sale and various mergers and acquisitions, and is now CBRE Group.

Sears sold Coldwell Banker's surviving residential unit to the Fremont Group, a California investment company, for $230 million in 1993. It was sold to HFS Inc., later Cendant, in 1996. When Cendant broke up in 2006, the real estate businesses were spun off as Realogy, which was sold to Apollo Management for about $7.75 billion. In 2022, Realogy rebranded as Anywhere Real Estate, Inc. In 2026, the company was acquired by Compass, Inc..
