= Mission burrito =

San Francisco food

Mission Burrito
- Type: Burrito
- Place of origin: United States
- Region or state: San Francisco, California
- Main ingredients: Flour tortilla, meat, rice, cheese

A Mission burrito (also known as a San Francisco burrito or a Mission-style burrito) is a type of burrito that first became popular during the 1960s in the Mission District of San Francisco, California. It is distinguished from other burritos by its large size and inclusion of rice and other ingredients. A key method to the burrito's construction is to steam the wheat flour tortilla to increase its flexibility prior to adding the other ingredients, although that is not a requirement and burritos may be grilled instead. It has been referred to as one of three major styles of burritos in the United States, following the earlier, simple burrito consisting of beans, rice, and meat. It precedes the California burrito, which was developed around the 1980s in San Diego and contains carne asada, cheese and French-fried potatoes.

Many taquerías in the Mission and greater San Francisco Bay Area specialize in Mission burritos. It is typically a large flour tortilla that is wrapped and folded around a variety of ingredients, served in a piece of aluminum foil. A food critic for the San Francisco Chronicle counted hundreds of taquerias in the Bay Area, and noted that the question of which taqueria makes the best burrito can "encourage fierce loyalty and ferocious debate". New York–based writer Calvin Trillin said that the burrito in San Francisco "has been refined and embellished in much the same way that the pizza has been refined and embellished in Chicago". Since its commercial availability began in the 1960s, the style has spread widely throughout the United States and Canada.

== History ==
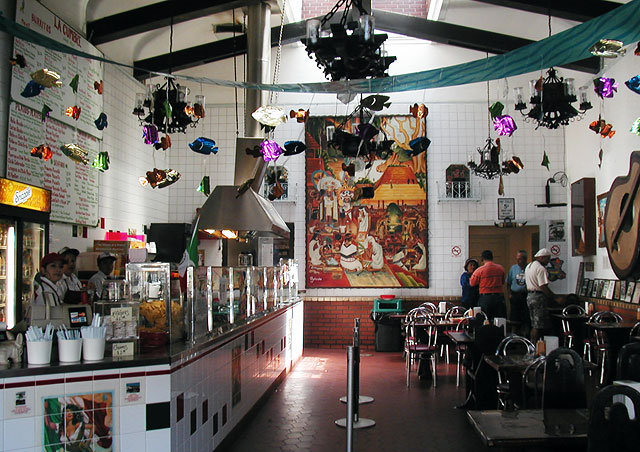
La Cumbre is credited as the first to sell the San Francisco‑style burrito, in 1972.

Long-time residents of the Mission District trace the origins of the Mission burrito back to the 1960s. The owners of La Cumbre Taqueria near Valencia and 16th have been credited as the first taqueria to sell this style of burrito. The creation of the style is credited to Raul and Micaela Duran who sold burritos from their meat market, which they converted into La Cumbre Taqueria in 1972. They date the birth of the San Francisco burrito to September 29, 1969.

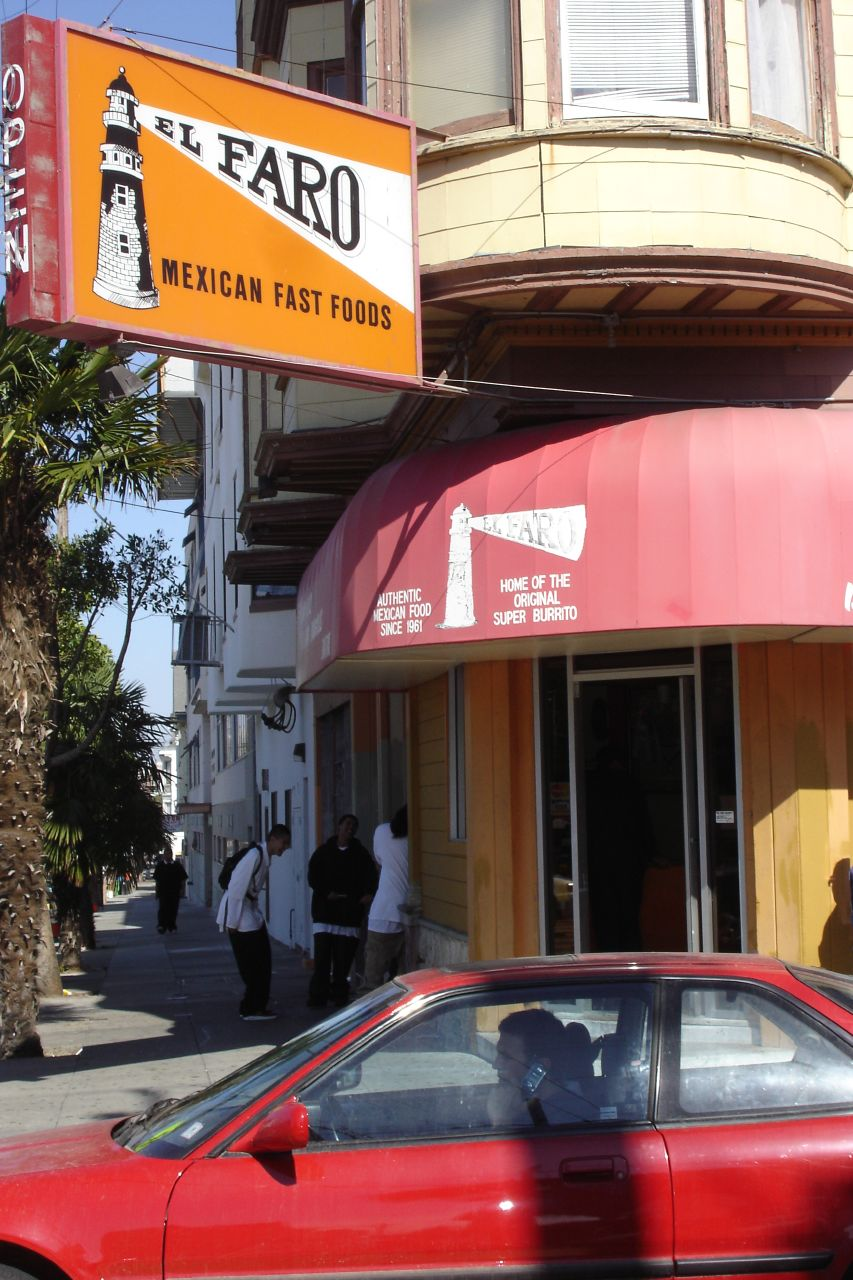
El Faro ("The Lighthouse"); some sources indicate this establishment as the originator of the San Francisco Mission‑style "super burrito" on September 26, 1961.

However, like most such claims, this is debated by others who claim to remember similar burritos from earlier in the decade. If the claims of the owner of "El Faro" are true, the first San Francisco burrito was sold September 26, 1961 to a group of San Francisco firefighters, using two 6-inch tortillas in place of what later became the large single tortilla. The fact that he did not have—and had not previously considered the need for—larger tortillas suggests that the birth of the Mission burrito as we now know it did not come earlier than that time. Yet the Mission burrito does have historical forebears in burritos made elsewhere. Some assert that the original San Francisco burritos were directly inspired by burritos brought by California Central Valley farmworkers into the fields, then reproduced in the city. One restaurant consultant remembered his teen years in the fields in the 1960s this way:

Freezing cold five AM mornings, the best time to pick lettuce, owners needed a very good cook to attract the best fast crews. We'd get huevos rancheros at five, sweet strong hot coffee with a shot of brandy at seven, then full spicy killer burritos at around 10:30, keep you going till afternoon. I remember the texture of the shredded beef, the heat of the green peppers, and the proper proportion of rice and beans. They were so spicy you didn't need salsa – but you needed that protein and fiber, couldn't survive without it.

— Peter Garin, quoted in SF Weekly, 1993

Other burrito researchers trace the burrito's ancestry even further back to miners of the 19th century. The first printed references to burritos came in the 1930s; in the 1950s and 1960s, versions of the burrito spread through the American Southwest and beyond.

But while the Mexican-American burrito began as a wider regional phenomenon, most would agree that the Mission burrito emerged as a recognizable and distinct local culinary movement during the 1970s and 1980s. One writer asserts that the Mission burrito—a large, compact and quite cheap meal—played a special role for those who lived through the local economic recession of the 1980s and early 1990s.

== Structure and eating practice ==
The aluminum foil wrapping, which is present whether the customer is eating in the restaurant or taking out, acts as a structural support to ensure that the burrito's tortilla "skin" does not rupture or unravel.

Diners eating Mission burritos customarily forgo utensils entirely and eat the burrito with their hands, tearing the foil gradually down as they eat from above, but keeping the foil on the bottom to continue to support the structure of the uneaten portion. Adding salsa to the burrito before each subsequent bite is a popular practice.

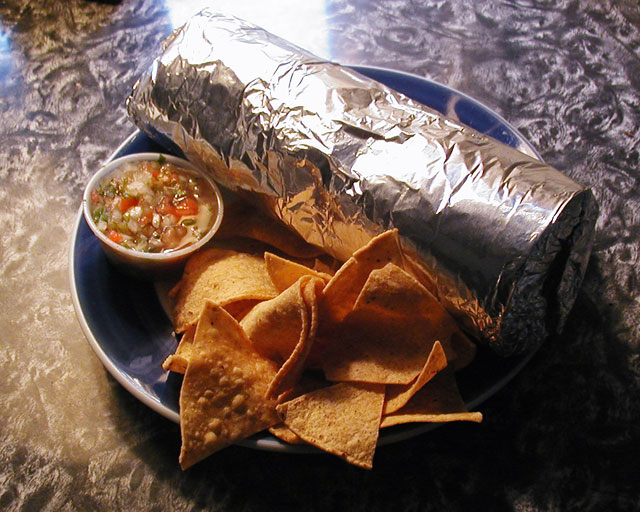
A standard presentation: the Mission burrito is served wrapped in foil, with chips and salsa on the side.

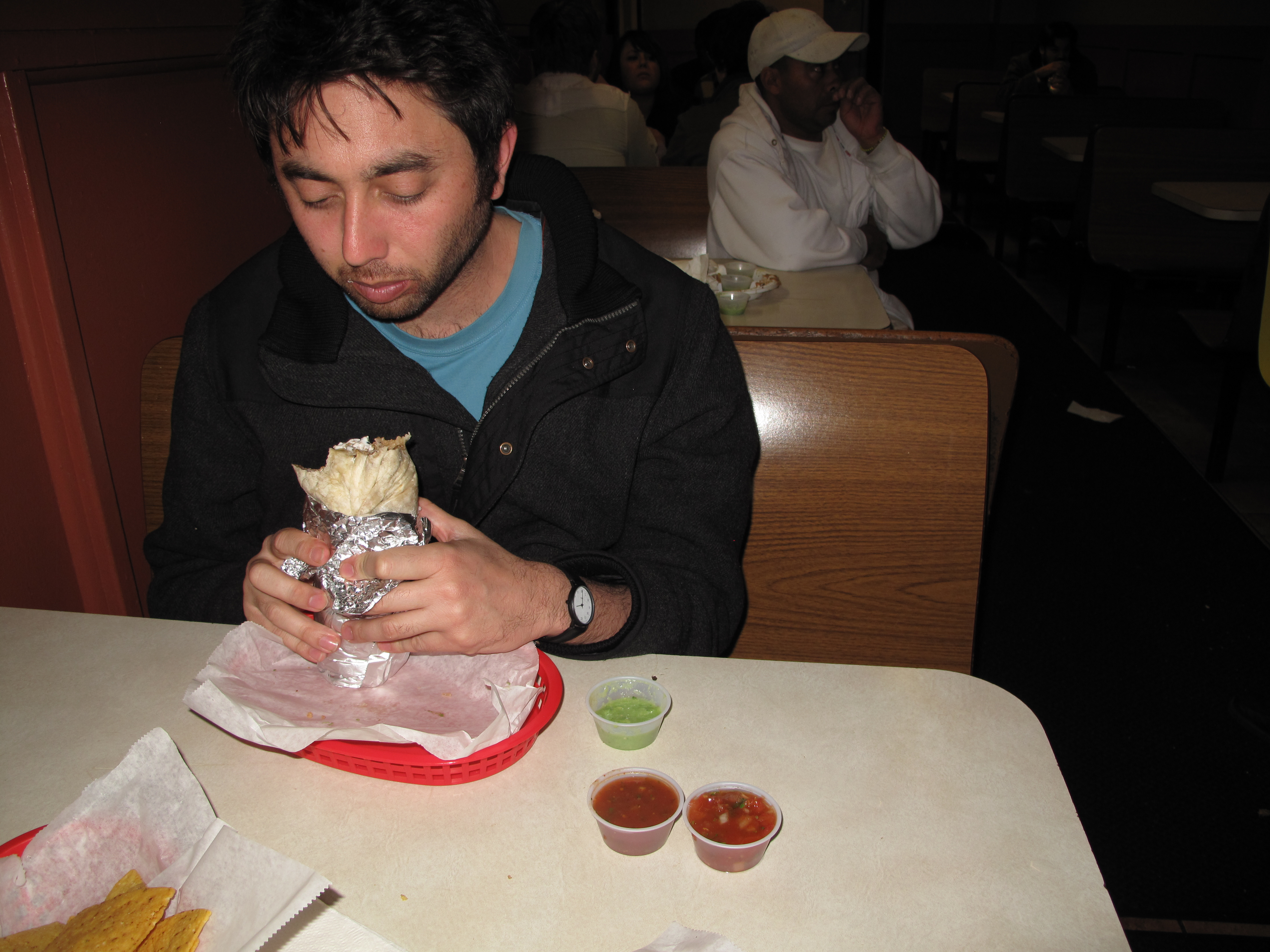
A man eats a Mission-style burrito in San Francisco, circa 2010.

== Culture and politics ==
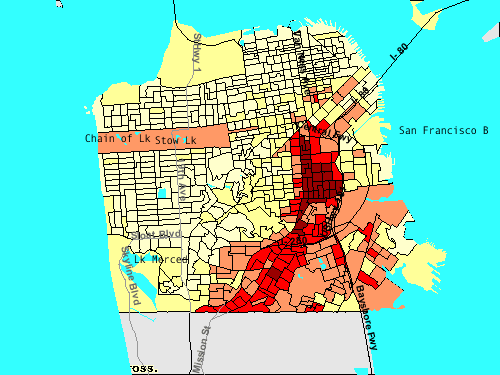
Census data illustrates areas of San Francisco with high numbers of Latino residents shown in red; the northern vertical portion is the Inner Mission; the lower diagonal portion includes the Excelsior and Crocker-Amazon districts. The northern portion, the historic home of the Mission burrito, and with the heaviest concentration of Latino residents, has been most subject to gentrification.

During the dot-com boom, the Mission District saw rapid gentrification, with lower paid workers forced out of the area by increasing rents. One anti-gentrification activist denounced the way that chain restaurants like Green Burrito were taking over the area, selling more expensive, "Anglo" versions of the burrito.

The rhetoric of burrito politics underscores the role of the Mission burrito in both bohemian and Chicano culture in San Francisco, as evidenced by a 1993 article published in the SF Weekly, featuring Chicano Studies professor Jose Cuellar.

== Spread and influence ==
Though an authentic mission burrito is made in San Francisco's Mission District at family owned Mexican restaurants called "taquerias", Chipotle Mexican Grill, Qdoba Mexican Grill, Panchero's Mexican Grill, Freebirds World Burrito, Barberitos, and Taco del Mar are large national chains in North America that arguably offer versions of a San Francisco style burrito. Chipotle was started by a chef who directly acknowledges the inspiration of Mission taquerias. The New York City-based restaurant chain BurritoVille, which existed from 1992 to 2008, specialized in San Francisco-style burritos. Atlanta was home to a couple of the first San Francisco-style burrito restaurants on the East Coast, Frijoleros and Tortillas, from the mid-1980s until the early 2000s.

The enlargement of the burrito to humongous, Americanized proportions may be the Mission's supreme contribution to Western civilization...

— John Krich, "San Francisco's Real Mission".

Some New York establishments advertise "Cal-Mex" or "San Francisco style" burritos. Two chains of Boston taquerias (Anna's Taqueria and Boca Grande Taqueria) are directly modeled after a local Bay Area chain, and other burrito businesses also cite the influence of San Francisco burritos.

Burritos made in the San Francisco style can be found in other cities across the United States.

A small chain of establishments have been appearing in the UK under the name "Mission Burrito" selling Mission-style burritos in Oxford, Reading, and Bristol and Bath. The Good Gringo, a collection of restaurants in Stockholm, Sweden, claims to serve "authentic San Francisco 'MISSION' style burritos".
