= Anna's Taqueria =

Fast-food chain in Massachusetts, United States

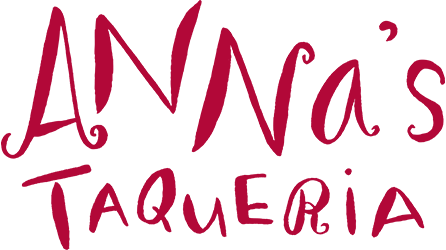

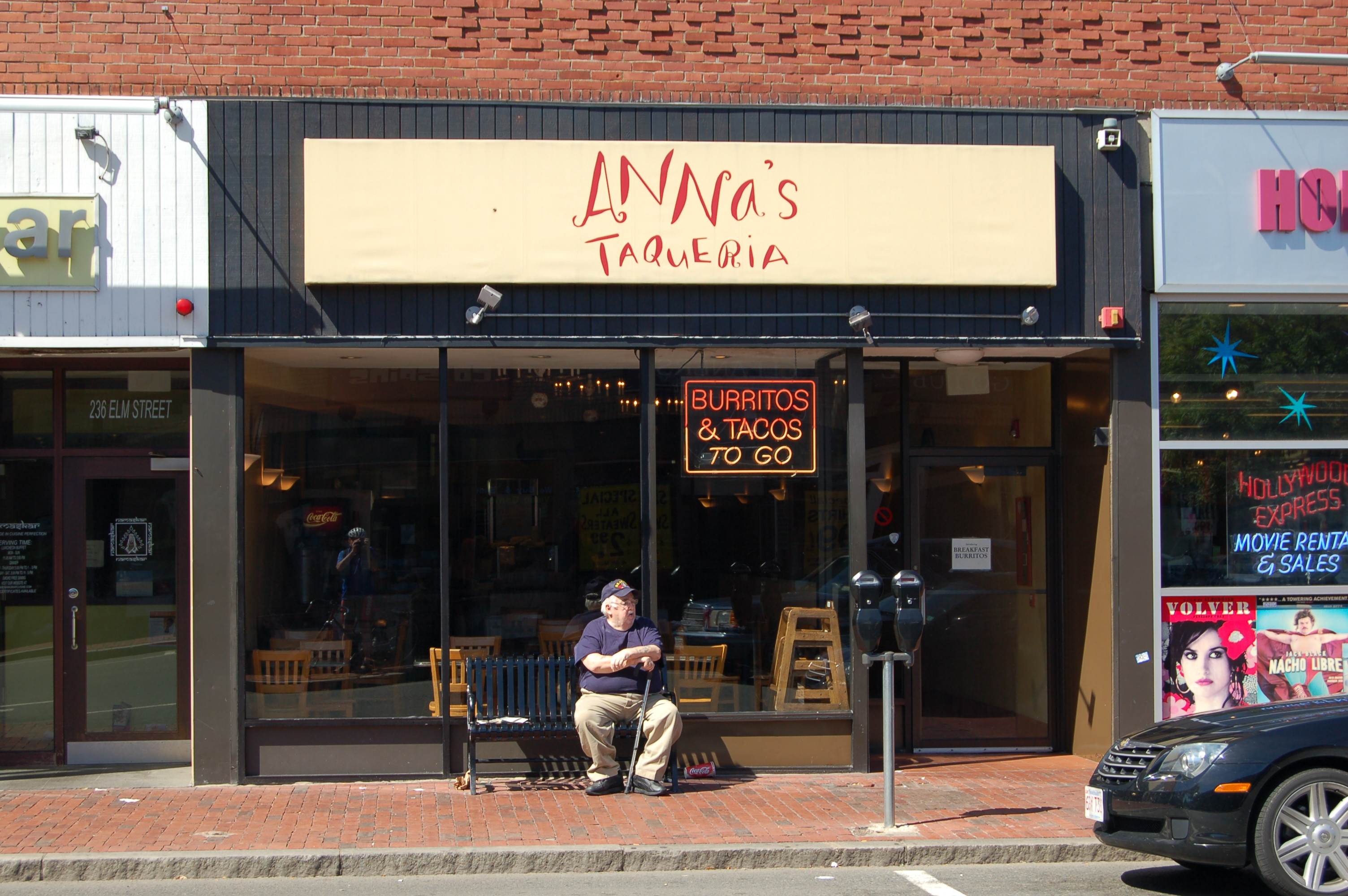
- Anna's Taqueria Davis Square, Somerville, Massachusetts location.
- Type: Private
- Industry: Restaurants
- Founded: 1995; 31 years ago
- Headquarters: Brookline, Massachusetts, U.S.
- Products: Mexican food
- Owner: Streetlight Ventures
- Website: annastaqueria.com

Anna's Taqueria is a chain of quick-service Mexican-fusion restaurants in the Boston area owned by private equity firm Streetlight Ventures.

== Overview ==
Anna's is modeled after U.S. West Coast style Mexican cuisine, specifically the Mission-style burrito of San Francisco. Its menu offers only five core items: burritos, tacos, quesadillas, burrito bowls, and salads. It has been described as "the best burritos for next to nothing". The food is made using an assembly line-style process. As of 2026, the chain has 14 stores in operation, including one in Cranston, Rhode Island.

In April 2009, Anna's Taqueria was recipient of the Boston Phoenix's 'Best of Boston' Award for best fast food, while the company has won Boston Magazine's 'Best of Boston' award multiple times.

== History ==
The first Anna's Taqueria was founded by Michael Kamio and located in Brookline's Coolidge Corner in 1995 after a disagreement with his sister Mariko Kamio, who owns the competing Boca Grande chain. Since then, a second Brookline restaurant was opened in addition to the locations in Porter and Davis Squares, and restaurants were opened at MIT's Stratton Student Center and on Cambridge St. in Boston across from the Massachusetts General Hospital. In 2024, Fenway Park added Anna's Taqueria as a concession vendor.

== Labor controversy ==
In 2004, Anna's Taqueria was made to pay $206,918 in back-wages to 127 employees. The Labor Department Wage and Hour Division found that the four stores had been employing individual employees at multiple locations and not paying the requisite time-and-a-half wages for time worked in excess of 40 hours between the months of January 2001 and January 2003.
