= Tito's Tacos =

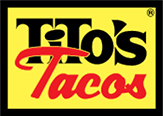
- Interactive map of Tito's Tacos

Restaurant information
- Established: 1959
- Owner: Lynne Davidson
- Previous owners: Benjamin Davidson; Norman Davidson
- Food type: Mexican-American cuisine
- Location: 11222 Washington Place, Culver City, California, United States
- Coordinates: 34.0082°N 118.4145°W
- Website: titostacos.com

Tito's Tacos is a taco stand in Culver City, California. Opened in 1959, it is known for its American-style hard-shell tacos and burritos. Considered a Los Angeles-area icon, the restaurant was named to Fox News' list of the ten best tacos in America in 2014, and was ranked #1 on The Daily Meal's "Top 35 Burritos in America" list in 2015.

== History ==
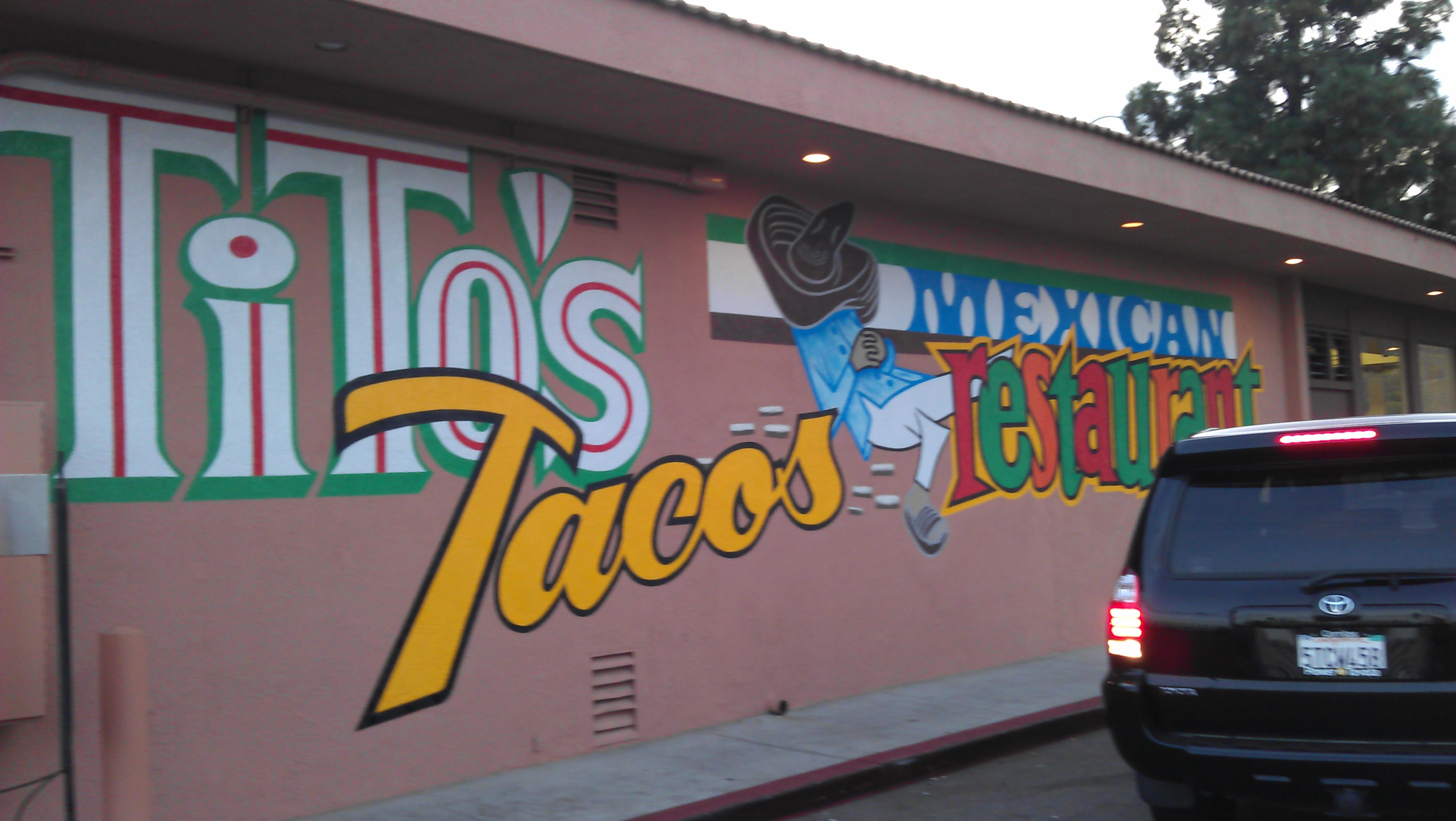
Restaurant exterior

Tito's Tacos was established in 1959 by Benjamin Davidson. The menu was developed by Davidson's business partner, Benny Vizcarra, with additional input from the restaurant's first employee, Amado Madera (From Huejuquilla el Alto, Jalisco). A year after its opening, Vizcarra wanted to buy out Davidson but did not have enough money to do so. At that point, Davidson solicited funds from his ex-wife, a native of Mexico, and bought out Vizcarra. The business came under the ownership of Davidson's son, Norman Davidson, a few years later. The restaurant was managed for 20 years by his son in law from 1976 to 1996. (Married to Norman's daughter Wendy). Lynne Davidson did not assume ownership until her father got ill in the 2000s.

In 2016, the restaurant changed its long-standing cash-only policy to accept credit cards.

In 2016, Tito's Tacos successfully filed a cease and desist order against the owner of Tito's Tacos of Vermont for trademark infringement. The Brattleboro, Vermont taco stand, which had been in business for ten weeks, agreed to change its name; it renamed itself Tito's Taqueria.

As of 2018, Tito's Tacos employs 95 workers. Full-time employees receive full medical and dental insurance coverage for themselves and their families.

Tito's Tacos can be seen in the classic 1989 film Gleaming the Cube.

== Menu and service ==
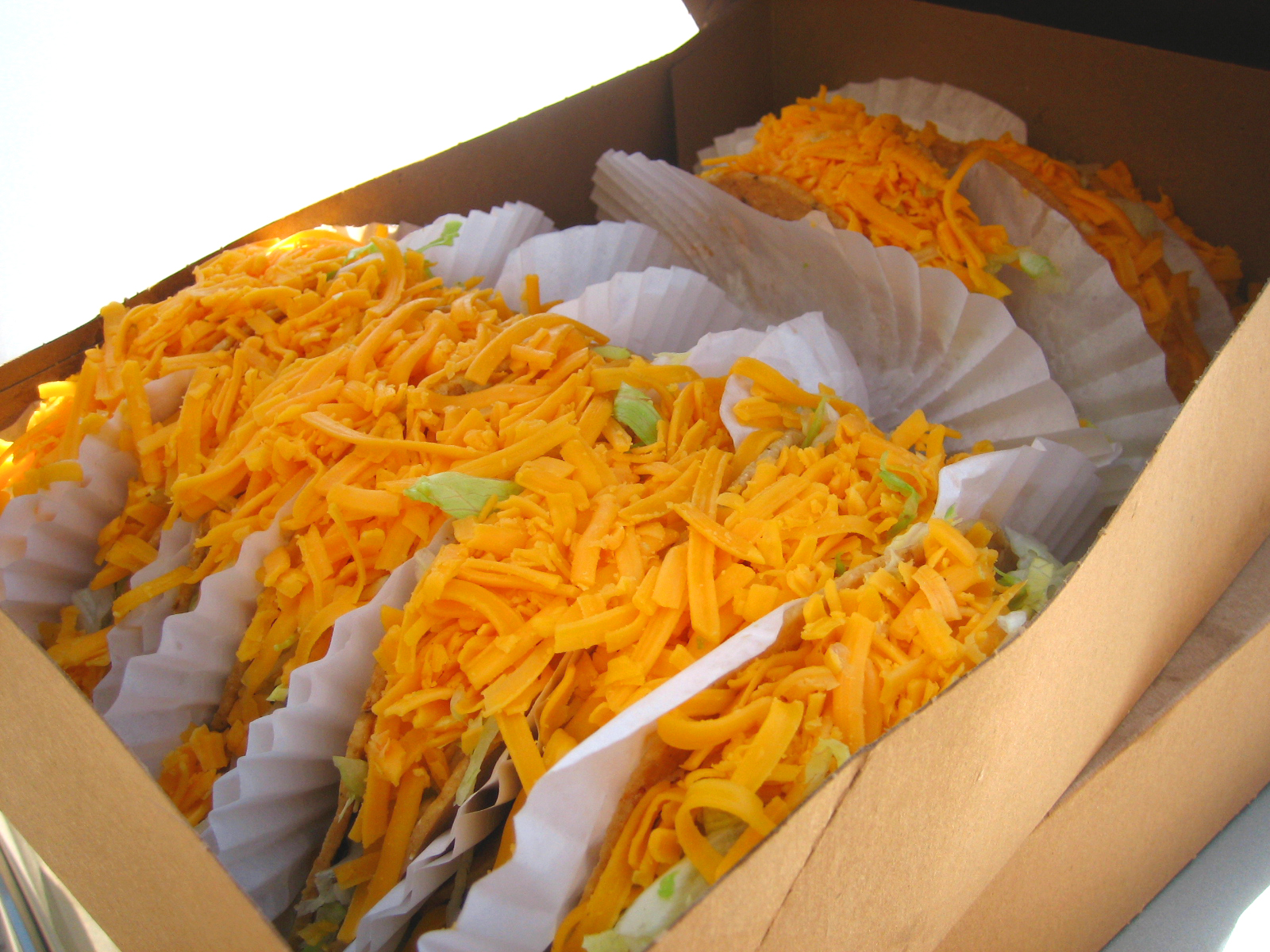
Order of Tito's Tacos

The menu is notable for its use of hard-shell rather than soft-shell tacos, which is unusual for Mexican restaurants in Los Angeles, and for using cold cheese. Its salsa has also attracted attention. The tacos are made to the same recipe introduced in 1959, and the menu has remained unchanged for decades.

Tito's Tacos is considered a Los Angeles-area icon. Many of its customers have nostalgic memories of eating there as children. The restaurant is known for its ubiquitous lines, although the lines "move quickly". Its high volume is reflected in its product use. On an annual basis, Tito's Tacos uses more than 8,000,000 lb (3,600,000 kg) of tortillas and more than 500,000 lb (230,000 kg) of beef.

== Critical response ==
In 2015, Tito's Tacos' bean and cheese burrito placed #1 on The Daily Meal's ranking of the top 35 burritos in America. Also in 2015, Tito's Tacos was named one of the "20 Places Where You Can Get the Best Tacos in the U.S." by Tech Times. In 2014, Fox News placed the taco stand on its top-ten list of the "Best Tacos in America".
