= Burro percherón =

Traditional Mexican dish

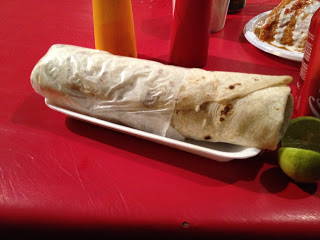
- A traditional burro percherón
- Place of origin: Mexico
- Region or state: Sonora
- Main ingredients: Tortilla, meat, tomato, avocado

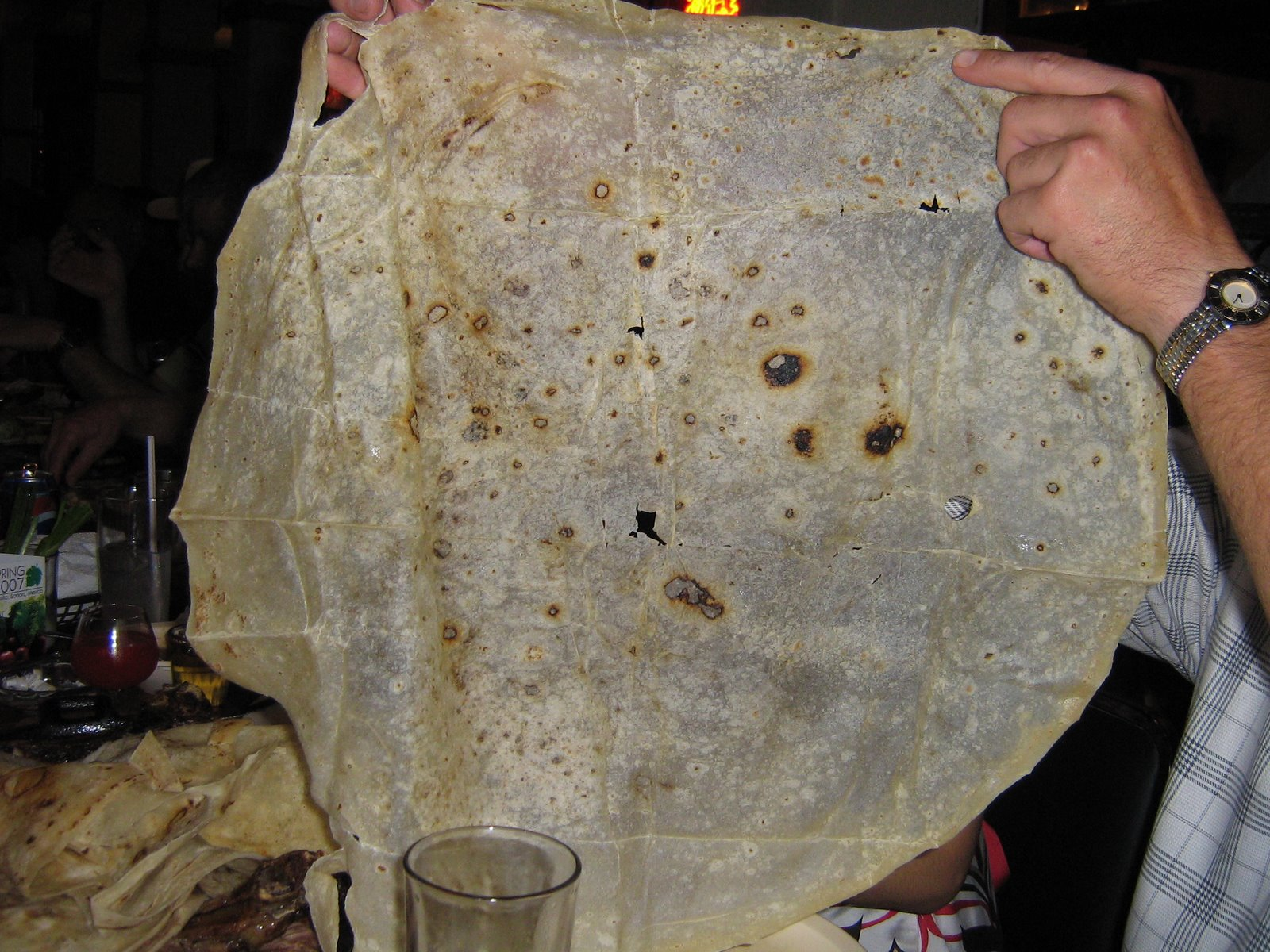
A tortilla used to make burro percherón.

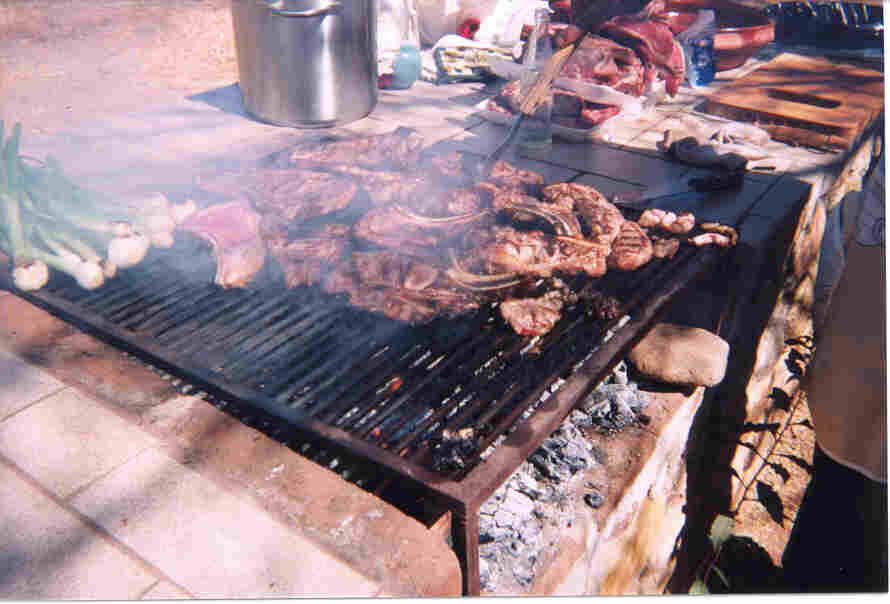
Carne asada, one of the most popular fillings of burro percherón.

A burro percherón is a traditional dish from the Mexican state of Sonora, originating in the cities of Hermosillo and Guaymas. A variation of the classic burrito, it is one of the most popular foods in these two cities, being offered in several establishments, both establishments and mobile food trucks, where they are offered mainly at night, although recently there are establishments that offer burro percherón in its menu throughout the day. Among the main and most striking features of burro percherón is that they are large in size and have a distinct taste due to the combination and concentration of the ingredients. Traditionally the burro percherón are prepared with grilled or charcoal-roasted meat, avocado, Mexican cheese or chihuahua cheese, and tomatoes (although variants exist in each restaurant). At present, the number of establishments serving burros percherones are growing and there are chains that manage franchises extending to several parts of the country.

== Origin ==
The existence of this food is relatively recent. It was rather a derivation from traditional burrito, made with wheat flour tortilla flour, in which meat is usually added to the iron and / or roasted with other variations. With the popularization of large tortillas, which are traditional in the Sierra de Sonora and locally called "tortillas sobaqueras" (because their size is a little smaller than the arm of the person who makes them), people began to experiment with them and began to prepare a new class of burrito, large and even could be taken into account as a complete meal, given their size.

== Variants ==
They are usually accompanied by cream, vegetables (such as tomato, lemon, and avocado), Manchego cheese and a spicy sauce made from tomatoes and spices.

In Hermosillo, mainly, combines many types of ingredients, such as mushrooms, tatemado chili, among others. Among the newest is the percheron drowned, bathed in tomato soup and cream, with a little cheese on top. At a Mexican restaurant called Percheronisimo, there is a challenge of a burrito that is one meter long, with 8 tortillas of flour and 1800 g of meat that has to be eaten by one person. As a prize the winner does not pay for the burrito and receives four free dinners. There are others up to two meters long.

There are many ingredients and variants such as:

- Pork rind
- Beans
- Barbecue
- Chilorio
- Machaca with egg
- Carnitas
- "Drowned" (smothered with Italian sauce).
- Meat with chili
- Italian (cold meats).

== See also ==
- Carne asada
- Taco
- Burrito
