= Barberitos =

Tex-mex restaurant chain

Restaurant information
- Established: January 2000; 26 years ago
- Owner: Woworks
- Previous owner: Downing Barber
- Food type: Tex-Mex
- Location: United States
- Other information: As of August 2023, there are 46 franchise agreements for Barberitos in the Southeastern US.
- Website: www.barberitos.com

Barberitos is an American franchise restaurant chain of Mission burrito-inspired restaurants based in Athens, Georgia, United States. The company name is a portmanteau of founder Downing Barber's last name and burrito.

== History ==
The idea of the restaurant developed when Downing Barber tried eating a healthy diet without a budget, while noticing a restaurant in Aspen, Colorado serving fresh food to customers. The original Barberitos in downtown Athens opened in January 2000. The company struggled early on, but started to turn things around by 2010.

In 2019, NFL player and UGA alum David Pollack joined Barberitos as the brand's ambassador.

On February 20, 2020, Barberitos celebrated its 20th anniversary.

In May 2022, the company was acquired by Woworks.

== Franchises ==
Franchising for the company began in 2002; as of August 2023, forty-six restaurants are operating through the Southeastern United States.

== Mascot ==
The company mascot is Pepe, a grinning chili pepper wearing dark glasses and clutching a burrito.
