= Boca Grande Taqueria =

Mexican restaurant chain

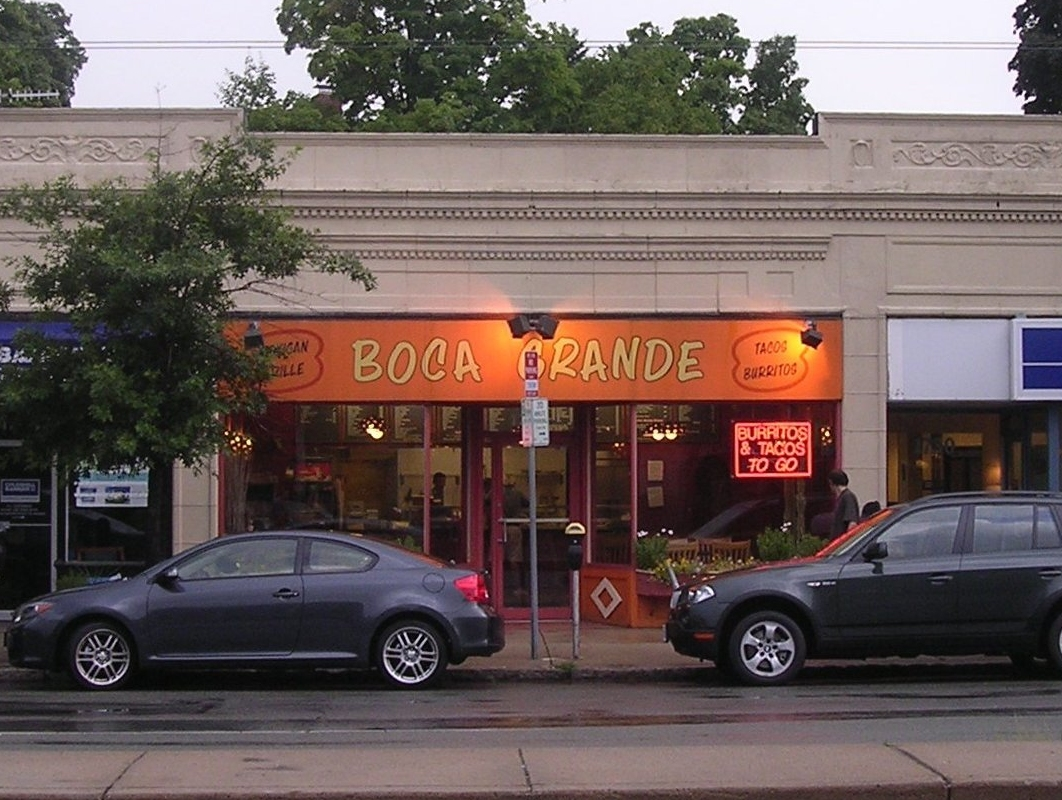
- Industry: Restaurants
- Headquarters: Boston, Massachusetts,
- Area served: United States

Boca Grande Taqueria is a chain of Mexican restaurants in the Boston, Massachusetts area.

== Overview ==
Boca Grande's fare includes burritos, quesadilla, tacos and enchiladas. They also provide catering services. The name "Boca Grande" in Spanish literally means "Big Mouth".

== History ==
Boca Grande was founded in 1986 by Mariko Kamio. The restaurant was modeled on Gordo's Taqueria, a successful San Francisco restaurant owned by Kamio's cousin. Mariko's brother, Michael Kamio, briefly joined the restaurant before founding his own chain of restaurants, Anna's Taqueria.

== Competition ==
Boca Grande is attempting to compete with other Boston-area taquerias such as Anna's Taqueria, Felipe's, Baja Betty's, Picante, and El Pelón, as well as national chains including Qdoba Mexican Grill and Chipotle Mexican Grill.

== See also ==
- List of Mexican restaurants
