= Taco stand =

Urban food stall, food cart that specializes in tacos and other Mexican dishes

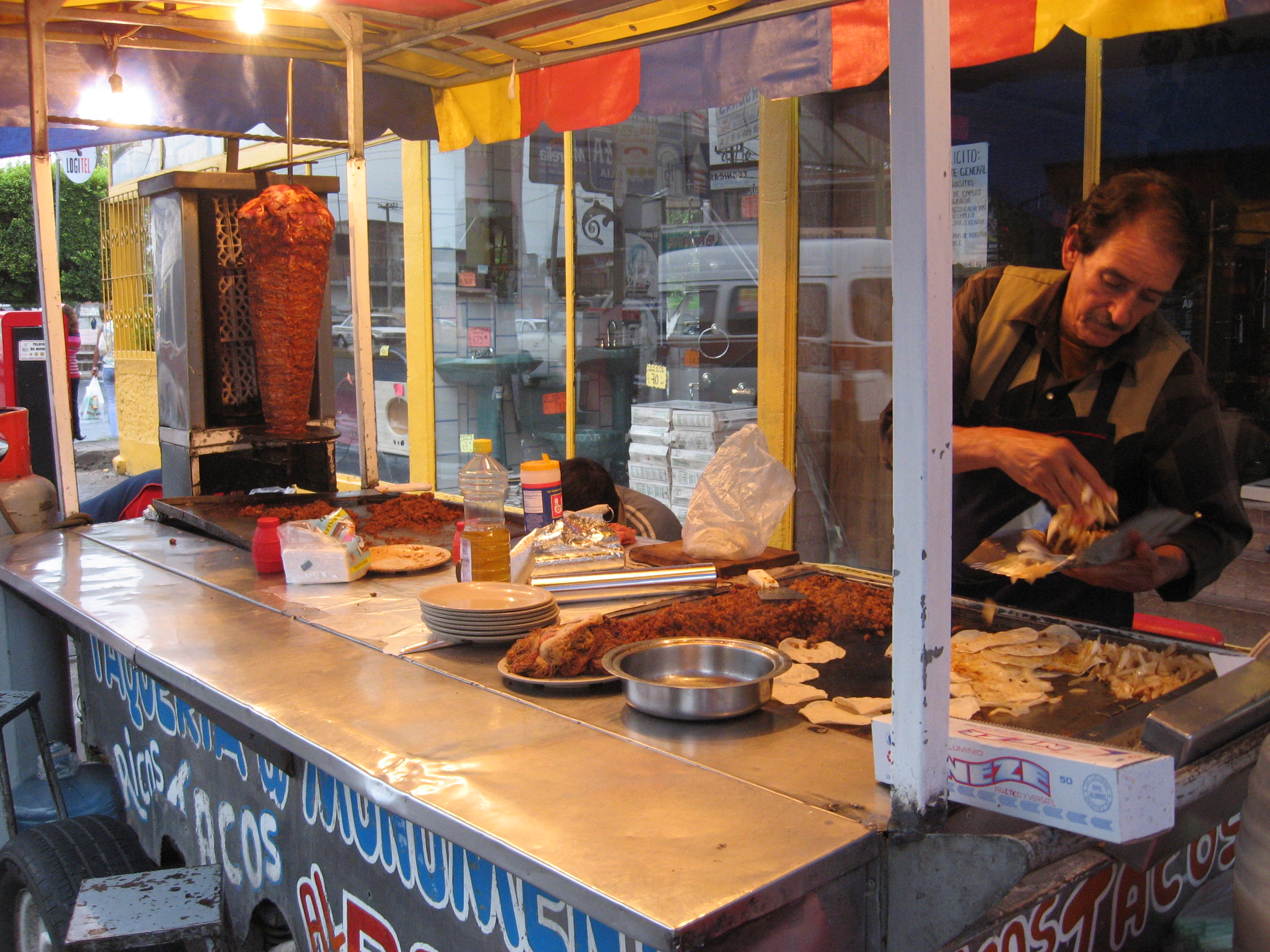
A taco stand in Morelia, Mexico

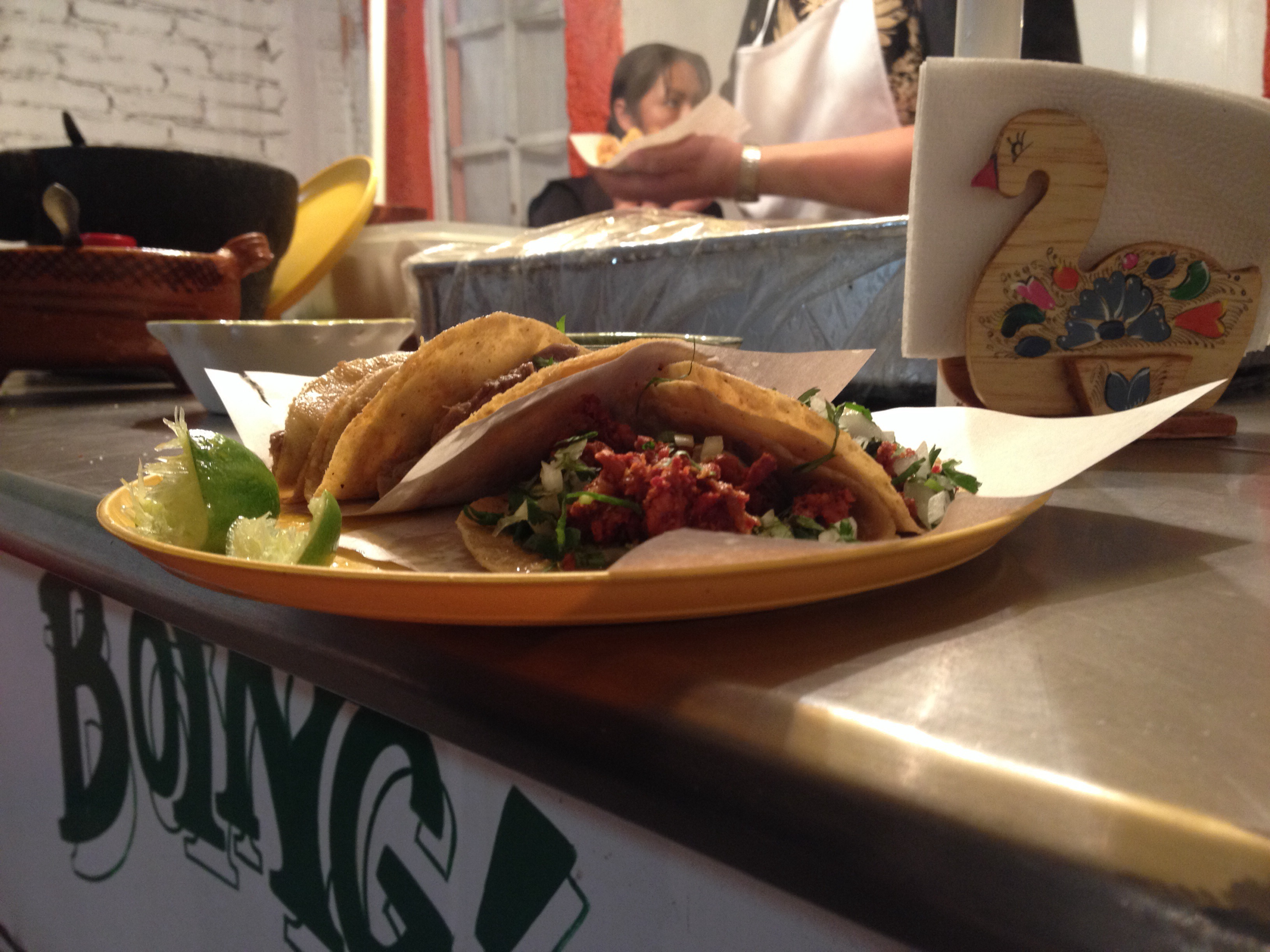
Tacos at a taco stand in Puebla, Mexico

A taco stand, taco shop or taquería is a food stall, food cart or restaurant that specializes in tacos and other Mexican dishes. The food is typically prepared quickly and tends to be inexpensive. Many various ingredients may be used, and various taco styles may be served. Taco stands are an integral part of Mexican street food. Tacos became a part of traditional Mexican cuisine in the early 20th century, beginning in Mexico City, as what had been a miner's snack began to be sold on street corners in the city. Shops selling tacos have since proliferated throughout Mexico and other areas with a heavy Mexican culinary and cultural influence, including much of the Western United States and most other larger American cities. More typical taquerías specialize in tacos, as expected, but in some localities it can be used to refer to restaurants specializing in burritos, where tacos themselves are less of a point of emphasis.

In Mexico, taco stands are commonly referred to as taquerías, because originally a taquería was typically a street vendor. However, many taquerías today are restaurants located in buildings. Taco stands may be located at roadsides and in areas where people gather, such as at outdoor mall areas. Taco stands are typically located outdoors, although the term is also used at times to refer to taco restaurants. Some taco stands are temporary operations, set-up for events such as fairs and festivals.

== Fare ==
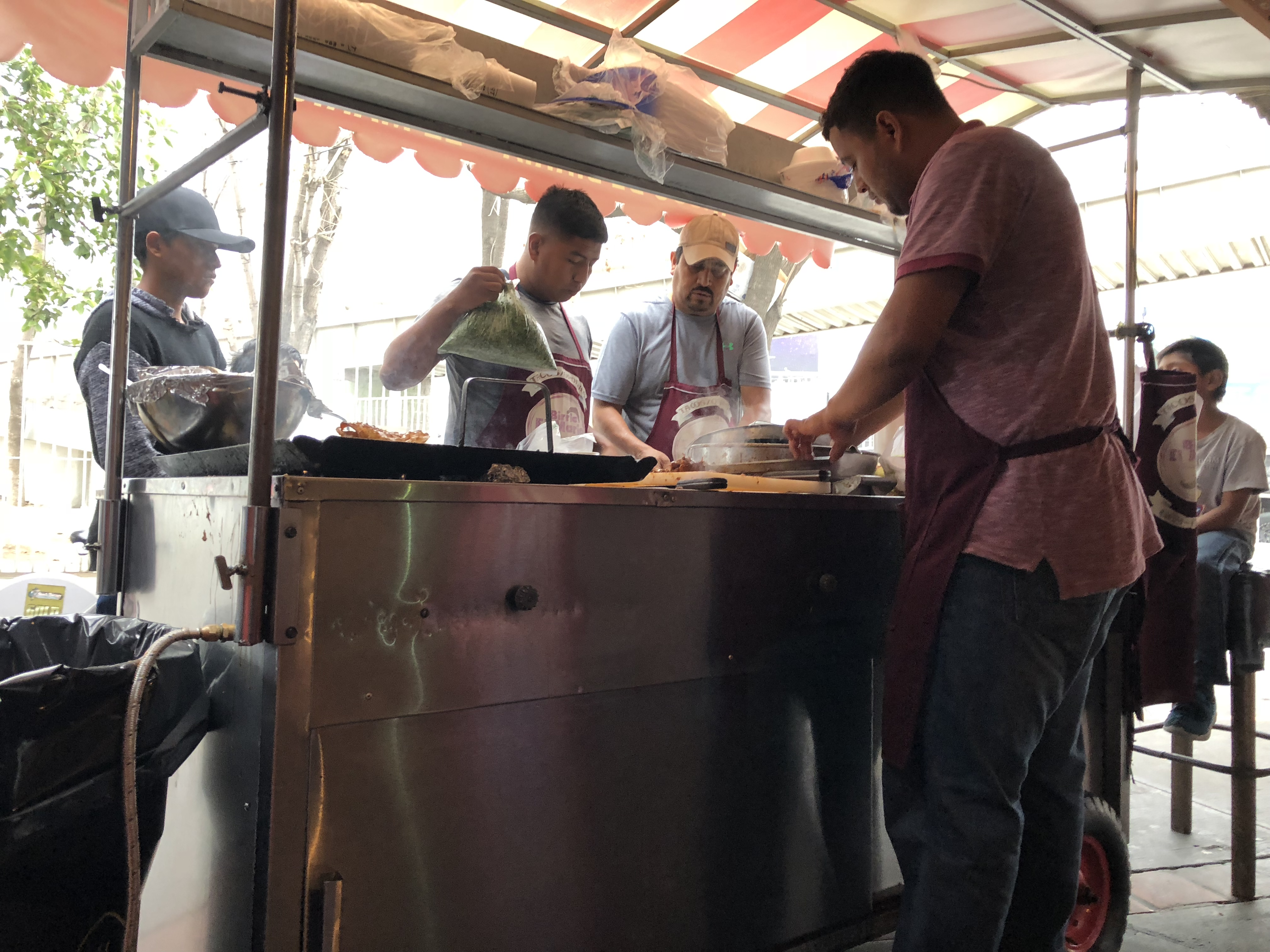
Taco stand at northbound vehicle border crossing in Baja California, México, serving only goat meat (tacos de birria)

Meats used include beef (such as carne asada and cabeza), pork (such as al pastor), goat meat (such as tacos de birria), shrimp and fish, as used in fish taco. Additional ingredients used include cheese, salsa, guacamole, sour cream, various vegetables such as onion and cilantro, and hot sauce, among others.

== By location ==
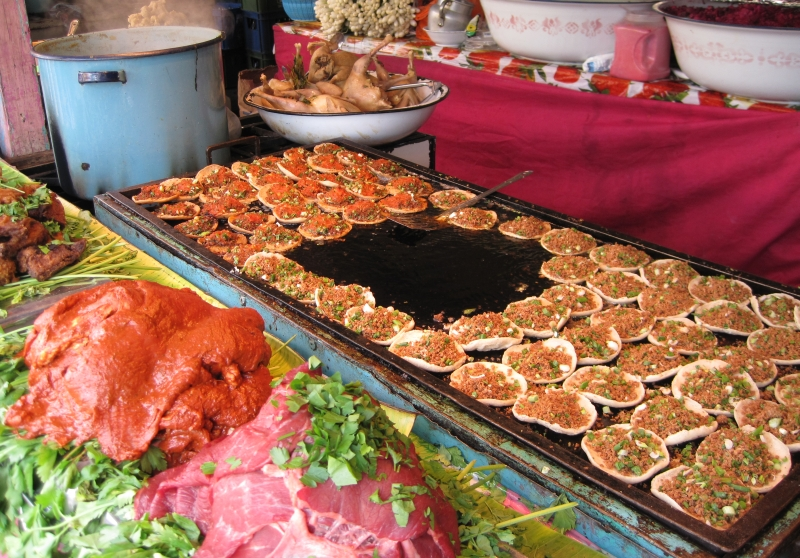
Tacos at a taco stand

=== Mexico ===
Taco stands are common in Mexico For example, Jalisco, Mexico has a diverse variety of taco stands in many of its neighborhoods. In Banderas, taco stands serve as gathering places for local residents, and stands develop reputations based upon variables such as food quality and variety.

El Taco de la Ermita is a popular outdoor taco stand in Baja California, Mexico that serves a diverse variety of gourmet-style tacos. Wait times can be an hour or longer, and the stand typically has an armed security guard on premises to maintain order.

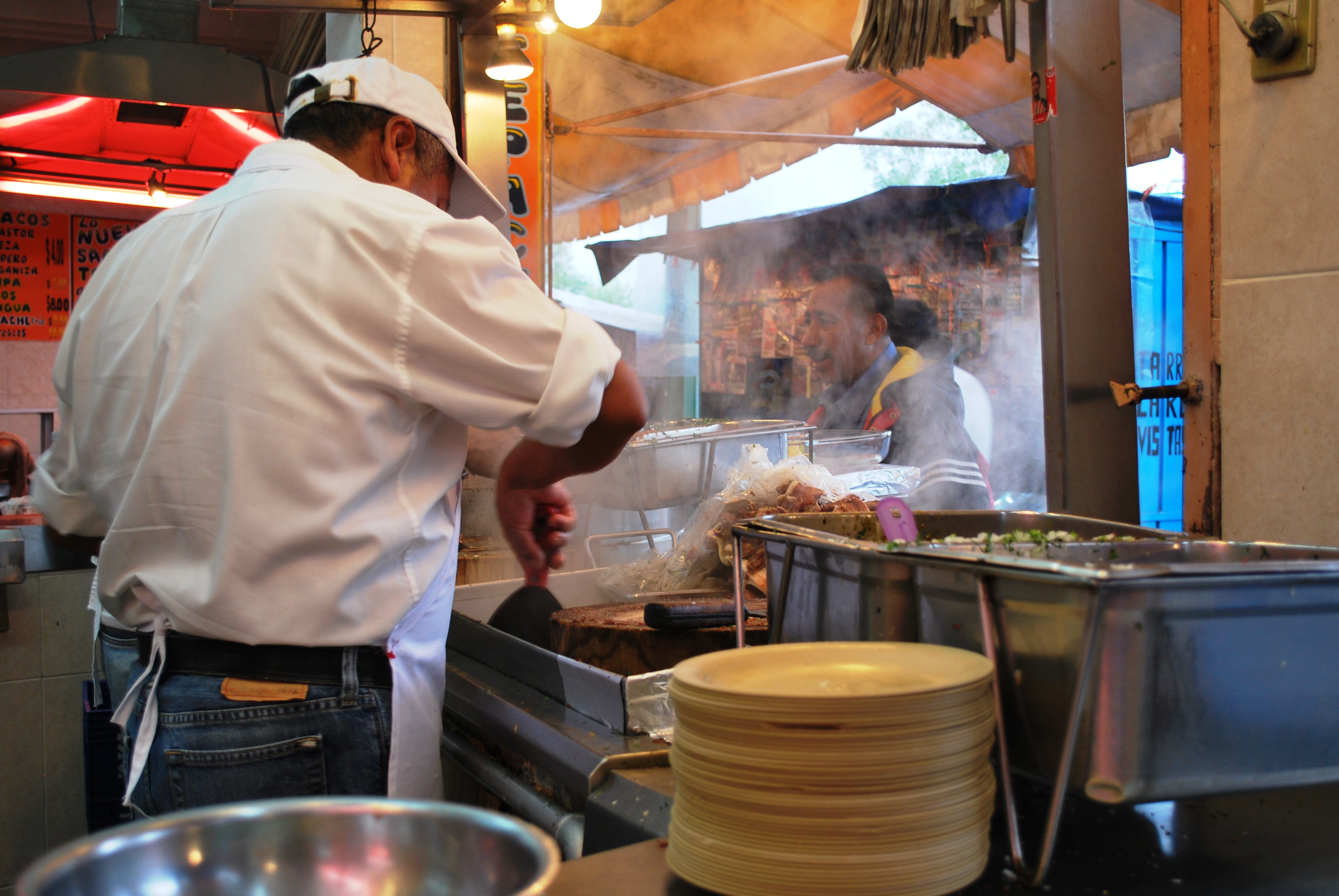
A taco stand in the Tacubaya neighborhood of Mexico City

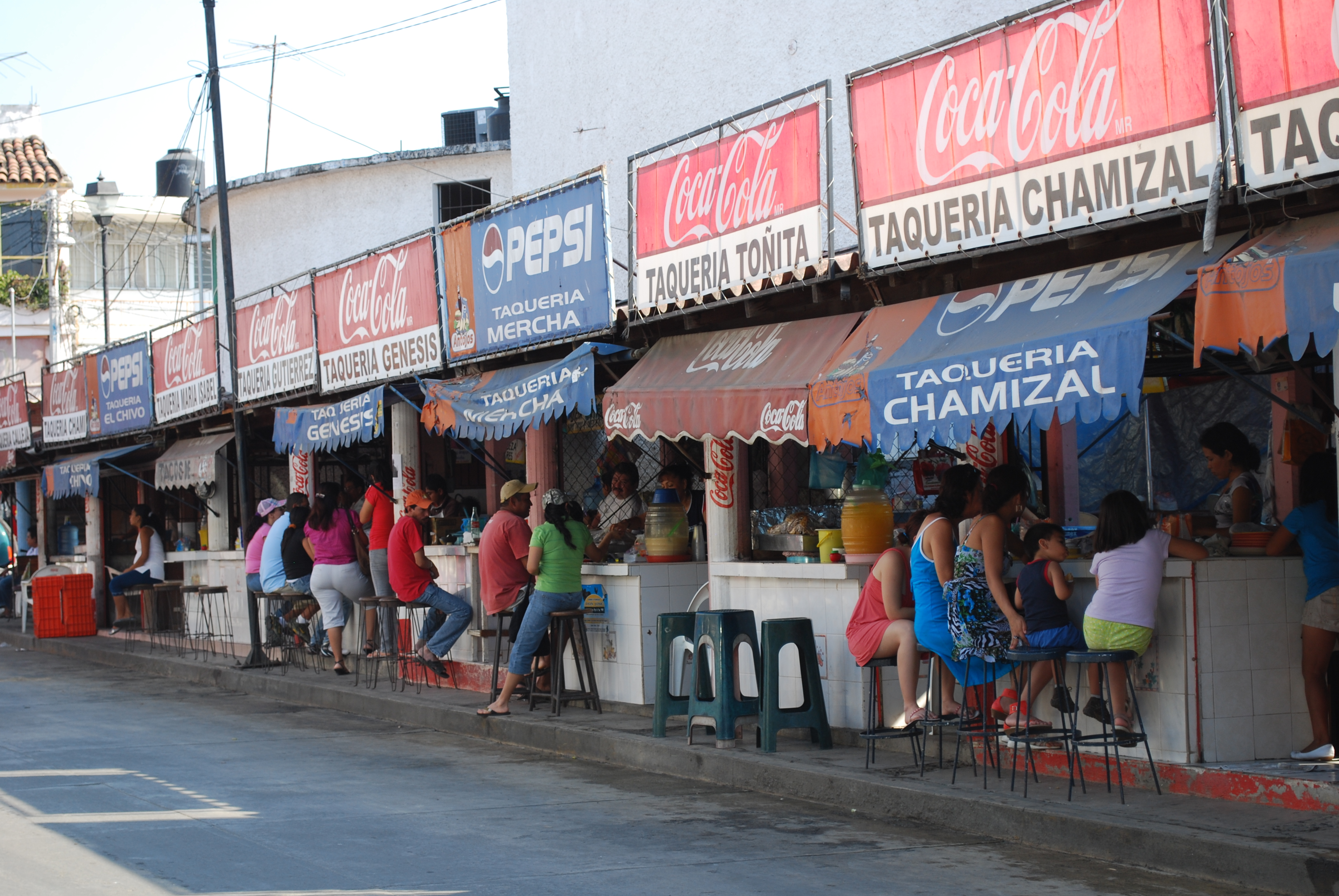
Taco stands along a street in Petatlán, Guerrero, Mexico

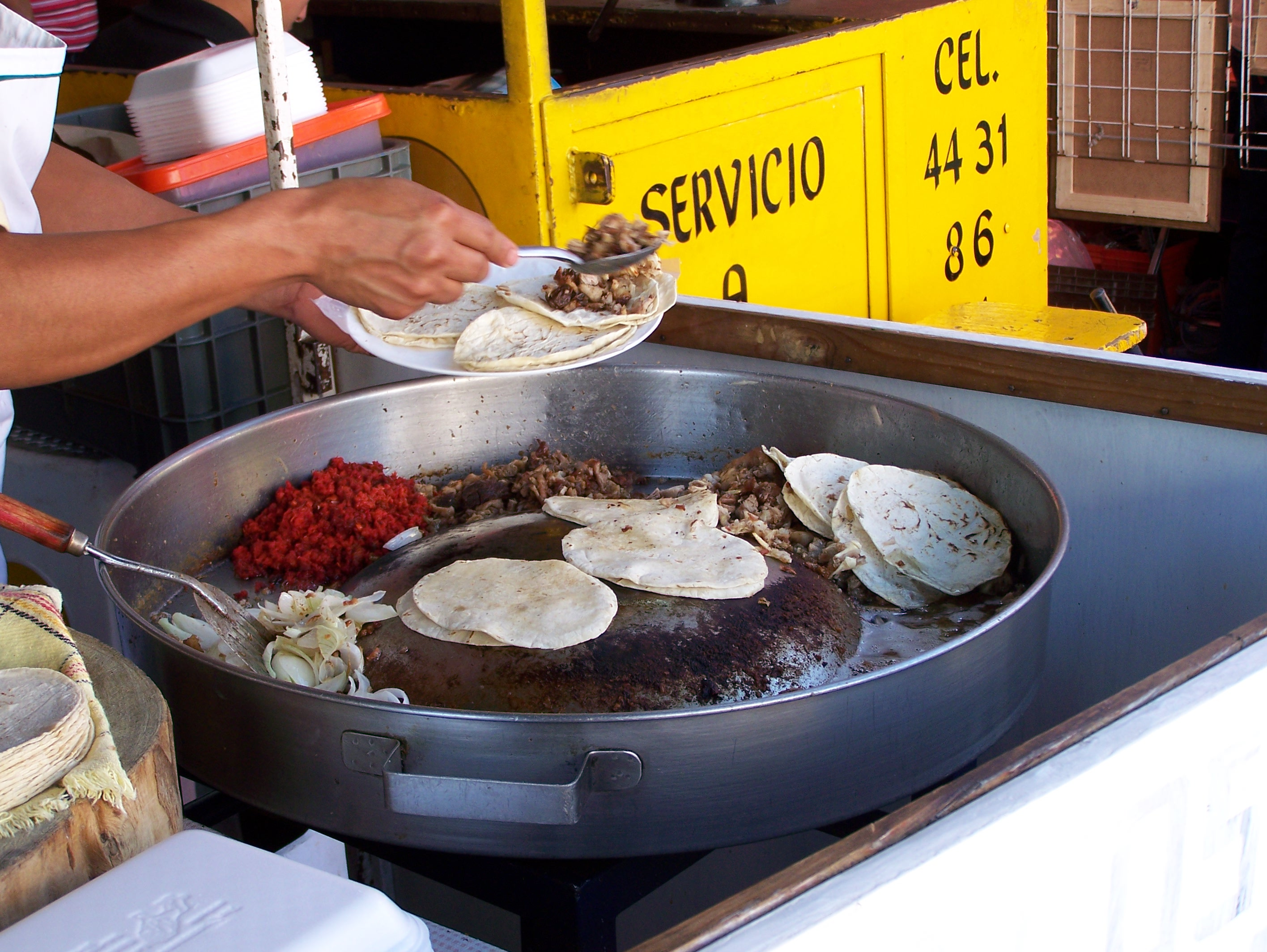
Tacos with beef suadero being prepared at a taco stand in Mexico

=== United States ===
In the United States, some brick-and-mortar restaurants may be referred to as taco stands. Some American chefs and service industry professionals have left their employment positions to open their own taco stands.

Ninfa Laurenzo, founder of the Ninfa's restaurant chain, started out running a single taco stand in Houston, Texas.

Prior to establishing the Taco Bell restaurant chain, Glen Bell, the company's founder, opened a small chain of taco stands named Taco-Tia in San Bernardino, California. Bell owned and operated a hamburger stand prior to opening Taco-Tia. In 2012, Taco Bell sold over two billion tacos annually, and had around 6,500 locations in all U.S. states and in several countries.

==== California ====
Due to its proximity to the Mexican border California is home to many taco trucks. Although it is famed for its fusions of flavors within this cuisine, perhaps the most famous one is the Korean taco.

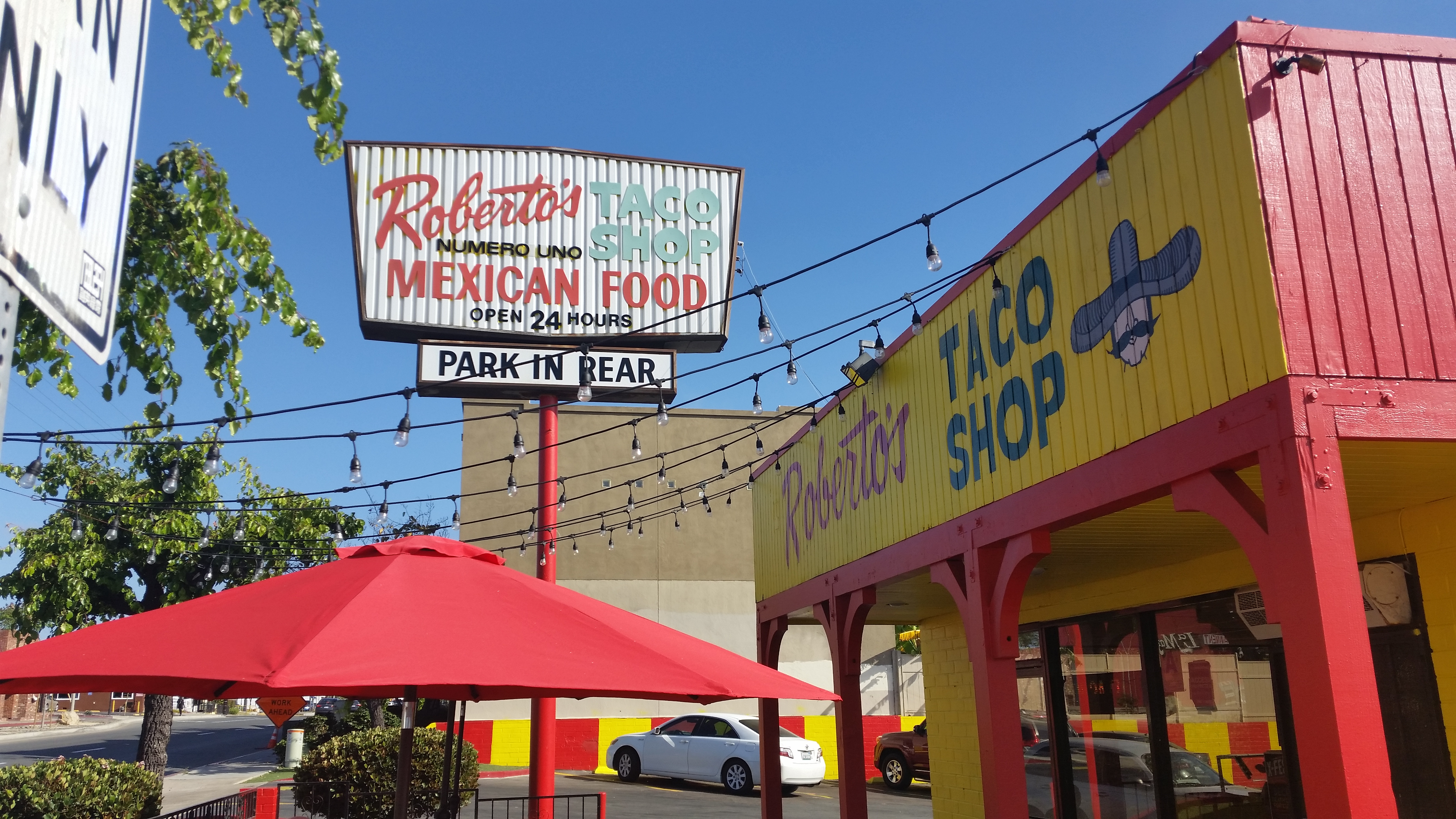
The first bertos taco shop in San Diego County

The Cielito Lindo Food Stand in Los Angeles, California is well known for its taquitos, and has been in business since the 1930s.

Tito's Tacos is a family-owned taco stand in Culver City that has been in operation since 1959. Featuring a short menu that has not changed in decades, the stand sells American-style hard-shell tacos filled with shredded beef and topped with shredded iceberg lettuce, and cold, grated cheddar cheese. It has a loyal customer base and is frequently seen with long lines, though the lines "move quickly".

Henry's Tacos was a well-known taco stand restaurant in North Hollywood, California that was in operation for 51 years. It went out of business in January 2013.

Prior to establishing Jimboy's Tacos, Jim and Margaret Knudson ran a mobile taco stand named Jimboy's Spanish Tacos in a converted trailer at King's Beach, Lake Tahoe, California.

La Reyna is a well-known taco stand in the Arts District of Downtown Los Angeles that serves tacos in front of its identically named brick-and-mortar restaurant.

Alebrije's Grill Taco Truck based in Santa Ana is a bright-pink truck home to the renowned 'Battleship Taco.' This consists of breaded steak, with rice, grilled onions, roasted cactus and hot sauce on a fresh tortilla. This style of taco has become very popular in the area.

==== Texas ====
In August 2006, "hundreds of taco stands" existed in Austin, Texas. AVATACO is a business association of taco stand owners in Austin that was formed circa April 2006.

==== Wyoming ====
Taco John's began as a small taco stand in Cheyenne, Wyoming named "Taco House" that opened in 1968.

==== Kansas ====
In early 2021, Forbes magazine named Kansas City, Kansas as the "true taco capital of the United States".

== See also ==
- Food truck
- Hot dog stand
- List of Mexican restaurants
- List of street foods
- Mobile catering
- Taco trucks on every corner
