= Burrito =

Dish of a flour tortilla wrapped to enclose a filling

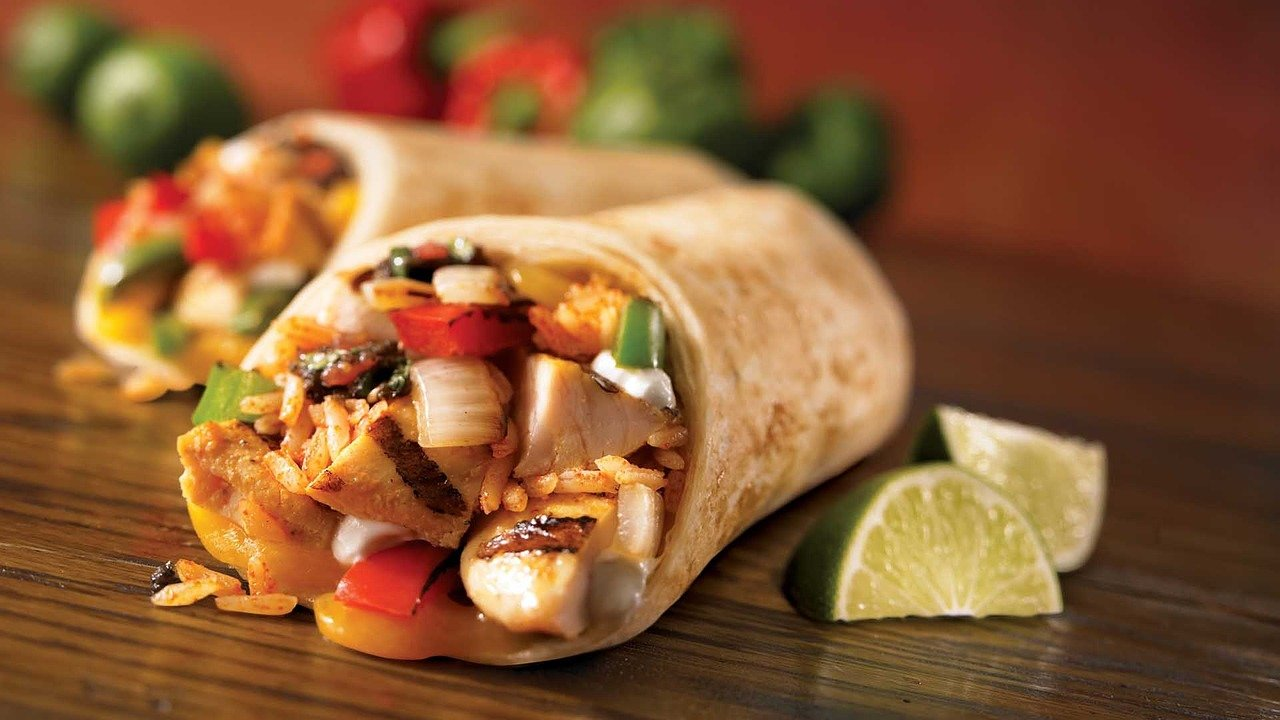
- A Mexican-style burrito served with some limes
- Type: Wrap
- Course: Breakfast, lunch, and dinner
- Place of origin: Mexico
- Serving temperature: Hot or room temperature
- Main ingredients: Flour tortillas, meat and beans or refried beans
- Ingredients generally used: Cheese, rice, lettuce, guacamole, salsa, sour cream
- Variations: Breakfast burrito; Mission burrito; Burro percherón; Chimichanga

A burrito (English: /bəˈriːtoʊ/, Spanish: [buˈrito]) is a dish in Mexican and Tex-Mex cuisine that took form in Ciudad Juárez, consisting of a flour tortilla wrapped into a sealed cylindrical shape around various ingredients. The tortilla is sometimes lightly grilled or steamed to soften it, make it more pliable, and allow it to adhere to itself. Burritos are often eaten by hand, as their tight wrapping keeps the ingredients together. Burritos can also be served "wet", covered in a savory and spicy sauce. Wet burritos are eaten with a fork and knife.

Burritos are filled with savory ingredients, most often a meat such as beef, chicken, or pork, and often include other ingredients, such as rice, cooked beans (either whole or refried), vegetables, such as lettuce and tomatoes, cheese, and condiments such as salsa, pico de gallo, guacamole, or crema.

Burritos are often contrasted in present times with similar dishes such as tacos, in which a small hand-sized tortilla is folded in half around the ingredients rather than wrapped and sealed, or with enchiladas, which use corn masa tortillas and are covered in a savory sauce to be eaten with a fork and knife.

Historically, burrito (or burro) was a regional name in Mexico for what in other parts of the country is known as a taco (a tortilla filled with food). The term burrito was regional, specifically from Guanajuato, Guerrero, Michoacán, San Luis Potosí, Sonora and Sinaloa, for what is known as a taco in Mexico City and surrounding areas, and codzito in Yucatán and Quintana Roo. Due to the cultural influence of Mexico City, the term taco became the default, and the meaning of terms like burrito and codzito were forgotten, leading many people to create new meanings and folk histories. In Central and Southern Mexico, burritos are still considered tacos, and are known as tacos de harina ("wheat flour tacos").

== Etymology ==
The word burrito means "little donkey" in Spanish, the diminutive form of burro, or "donkey". Sonoran historian and politician, Horacio Sorbazo Díaz, explained that the term originated in Sonora where some dubious taco stands would sell donkey meat instead of beef, and people, maliciously, began calling tacos "burritos" implying they were made with donkey meat. Another possible origin is that it derives from the tendency for burritos to contain a lot of different things similar to how a donkey would be able to carry a large burden. An additional possible origin could be due to their resemblance to a rolled up pack as typically carried by donkeys, making it an example of synecdoche.

== History ==
Before the development of the modern burrito, the Maya civilization of Mexico used corn tortillas as early as 1500 BC to wrap foods, with fillings of chili peppers, tomatoes, mushrooms, squash, and avocados. Historically, the Pueblo peoples of the Southwestern US also made tortillas filled with beans and meat sauce and prepared much like the modern burrito. But these preparations could also be said to be the origin of the simpler taco, rather than the modern burrito.

The precise origin of the modern burrito is not currently known, but there is evidence that in Mexico burrito was mainly another name, among others, for a taco, a rolled tortilla, whether corn or wheat, filled with meat or other ingredients. In the 1895 Diccionario de Mejicanismos by Feliz Ramos i Duarte, burrito was identified as the regional name given in the Mexican state of Guanajuato to what is known as a taco in other regions:

Burrito: Tortilla arrollada, con carne u otra cosa dentro, que en Yucatán llaman coçito, y en Cuernavaca y en Mexico, taco.

Burrito: Rolled-up tortilla, with meat or other things inside, what in Yucatán is called a coçito and in Cuernavaca and Mexico [City] a taco.

— Feliz Ramos i Duarte

Both Diccionario Agrícola Nacional (1935), by the Mexican Dirección General de Estadística, and Diccionario de Mejicanismos (1959), by Mexican linguist and philologist Francisco J. Santamaría, identify burrito as another name for a taco in the state of Guerrero, while in the State of Sinaloa it is specifically a taco filled with salt:

En el Estado de Guerrero, taco, en el sentido de tortilla arrollada con comida adentro. En Yucatan le llaman coorto. En Sinaloa, taco de tortilla con sal.

(In the State of Guerrero, taco, in the sense of a rolled-up tortilla with food inside. In Yucatan they call it coorto. In Sinaloa, a tortilla taco with salt.)

— Francisco J. Santamaría

The Dictionary of Mexican Spanish (Diccionario del Español de México) by the Colegio de México also provides those definitions, stating that it is a regionalism from both the states of Guerrero and Michoacán for taco; it also states that, in the state of Sinaloa, it is a "taco de sal" (salt taco), a rolled corn tortilla with salt in it.

In Vocabulario Sonorense (1966), Sonoran writer, historian and politician, Horacio Sobarzo Díaz, states the same, writing that burro is another name for a taco, but argues that it is a regionalism from Sonora and that it originated from the fact that in some places in that state, donkey meat was sold instead of beef:

Burro, s.m. Envoltorio de tortilla con carne o algún otro alimento, taco. Alude el vocablo a la carne de burro que ha sido apetecida por nuestros indígenas. La carne seca del vacuno es muy gustada en Sonora, y se ha observado en algunas ocasiones que, aprovechándose esta circunstancia, se trafique fraudulentamente con carne oreada de burro. Es de presumirse que en lugares donde se servían fritangas se "diera gato por liebre", y aludiéndose a ello maliciosamente se denominara burro al taco.

(Burro, s.m. A tortilla wrap with meat or some other food, taco. The word alludes to donkey meat that has been enjoyed by our indigenous people. Dried beef is very popular in Sonora, and it has been observed on some occasions that, taking advantage of this circumstance, dried donkey meat is fraudulently sold. It is presumed that in places where fried foods were served, a "bait and switch" was done, and alluding to this maliciously, the taco was called burro (donkey).)

— Horacio Sobarzo Díaz

In her book Life in Mexico (1843) Scottish noblewoman Frances Erskine Inglis writes that she ate burros, tortillas filled, in this case, with cheese, while on the road in Michoacán:

... the gentlemen from Morelia, suffering for their politeness in having escorted us, the two damsels of the bath, naiads of the boiling spring, pitying our hungry condition, came to offer their services; one asked me if I should like "to eat a burro in the mean time"? A burro being an ass, I was rather startled at the proposition, and assured her that I should infinitely prefer waiting a little longer before resorting to so desperate a measure. "Some people call them pecadoras", (female sinners!) said her sister. Upon this, the gentlemen came to our assistance, and burros or pecadoras were ordered forthwith. They proved to be hot tortillas, with cheese in them, and we found them particularly good.

Being that burrito or burro was originally a regional name for what is known as a taco or codzito in other regions of Mexico, the use of both corn and wheat flour tortillas was understandable. References to burritos made with corn tortillas appear as late as 1938 in California. Ana Bégué de Packman, author of the book Early California Hospitality (1938), wrote that corn and flour tortillas could be used interchangeably for making burritos.

Currently, wheat flour tortilla burritos are known as "tacos de harina" (wheat flour tacos) in Central and Southern Mexico.

=== Folk history ===
Stemming from the view that burritos are distinct from tacos, there are many explanations and folk stories about the origin of burritos, most of them originating in the United States.

An often repeated piece of folk history is the story of a man named Juan Méndez who sold tacos at a street stand in the Bella Vista neighborhood of Ciudad Juárez during the Mexican Revolution period (1910–1921), while using a donkey as a transport for himself and his food. To keep the food warm, Méndez wrapped it in large homemade flour tortillas underneath a small tablecloth. As the "food of the burrito" (i.e., "food of the little donkey") grew in popularity, "burrito" was eventually adopted as the name for these large tacos.

Some have speculated that it may have originated with vaqueros, the cowboys of northern Mexico in the 19th century.

In 1923, Alejandro Borquez opened the Sonora Cafe in Los Angeles; it was later renamed El Cholo Spanish Cafe. Burritos first appeared on American restaurant menus at the El Cholo Spanish Cafe in Los Angeles during the 1930s. Burritos were mentioned in the U.S. media for the first time in 1934, appearing in the Mexican Cookbook, a collection of regional recipes from New Mexico that was written by historian Erna Fergusson. In 1956, a frozen burrito was developed in Southern California by Duane Roberts.

== Development of regional varieties ==
=== Mexico ===
Burritos are a traditional food of Ciudad Juárez, a city bordering El Paso, Texas, in the northern Mexican state of Chihuahua, where people buy them at restaurants and roadside stands. Northern Mexican border towns like Villa Ahumada have an established reputation for serving burritos. Authentic Mexican burritos are usually small and thin, with flour tortillas containing only one or two of several ingredients: either some form of meat or fish, potato, rice, beans, asadero cheese, chile rajas, or chile relleno. Other ingredients may include: barbacoa, mole, refried beans and cheese (a "bean and cheese" burrito), or deshebrada (shredded slow-cooked flank steak). The deshebrada burrito has a variation with chile colorado (mild to moderately hot) and one with salsa verde (very hot). The Mexican burrito may be a northern variation of the traditional taco de Canasta, which is eaten for breakfast, lunch, and dinner.

Although burritos are one of the most popular examples of Mexican cuisine outside of Mexico, they are only popular in the northern part of Mexico. However, they are beginning to appear in some nontraditional venues in other parts of Mexico. Wheat flour tortillas (used in burritos) are now often seen throughout much of Mexico (possibly due to these areas being less than optimal for growing maize or corn), despite at one time being particular to northwestern Mexico, the Southwestern US Mexican-American community, and Pueblo Indian tribes.

Burritos are commonly called tacos de harina ("wheat flour tacos") in Central Mexico and Southern Mexico, and burritas (the feminine variation with 'a') in "northern-style" restaurants outside of northern Mexico proper. A long and thin fried burrito called a chivichanga, which is similar to a chimichanga, is prepared in the state of Sonora and vicinity.

A variation of the burrito found in the Mexican state of Sonora is known as the burro percherón.

=== San Francisco Mission burrito ===
Mission-style burrito containing shredded pork, beans, and rice

The origins of the Mission burrito or Mission-style burrito can be traced back to San Francisco, in the Mission District taquerías of the 1960s and 1970s. This type of burrito is produced on a steam table assembly line, and is characterized by a large stuffed flour tortilla wrapped in aluminum foil, and may include fillings such as carne asada (beef), Mexican-style rice, whole beans (not refritos), sour cream and onion.

Febronio Ontiveros claims to have offered the first retail burrito in San Francisco in 1961 at El Faro ("The Lighthouse"), a corner grocery store on Folsom Street. Ontiveros claims credit for inventing the "super burrito", a style which may have led to the early development of the "San Francisco style". This innovative style involves the addition of rice, sour cream and guacamole to the standard burrito of meat, beans, and cheese. The Mission burrito emerged as a regional culinary movement during the 1970s and 1980s. The popularity of San Francisco-style burritos has grown locally at Mission Street taquerias like Taqueria El Farolito, and nationally at chains like Chipotle Mexican Grill, Illegal Pete's, Chevy's Fresh Mex, Freebirds World Burrito, Qdoba, and Barberitos. Chili's had a brief stint with "Fresh Mex" foods and burritos between 2015 and 2017. In 1995, World Wrapps opened in San Francisco's Marina District and brought a burrito-inspired wrap style to the restaurant industry.

=== San Diego ===
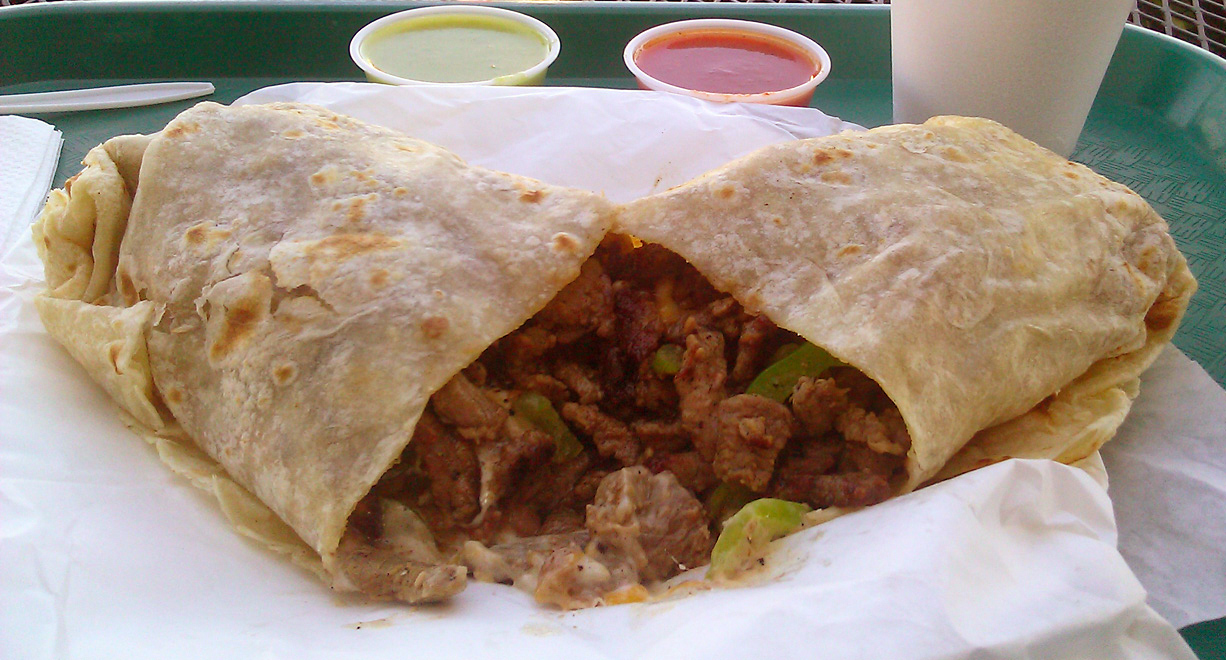
Contents of a carne asada burrito

San Diego–style burritos include "California burritos" and carne asada burritos. The style has been described by food writers as an "austere meal of meat, cheese and salsa", a contrast to the Mission-style burrito, which is typically larger and always contains more ingredients. A significant subgroup of Mexican restaurants in San Diego serves burritos described as "no-frills" and, in contrast to Mission-style burritos, the assembly line is not used.

In the early 1960s, Roberto Robledo opened a tortilleria in San Diego and learned the restaurant business. Robledo began selling small bean burritos (or burrititos) at La Lomita in the late 1960s, and by 1970, he had established the first Roberto's Taco Shop. By 1999, Roberto's restaurants had expanded to a chain of 60 taco shops offering fresh burritos known for their distinctive quality. Hoping to draw on the prestige of Roberto's, new taco shops in San Diego began using the "-bertos" suffix, with names like Alberto's, Filiberto's, Hilberto's, and others.

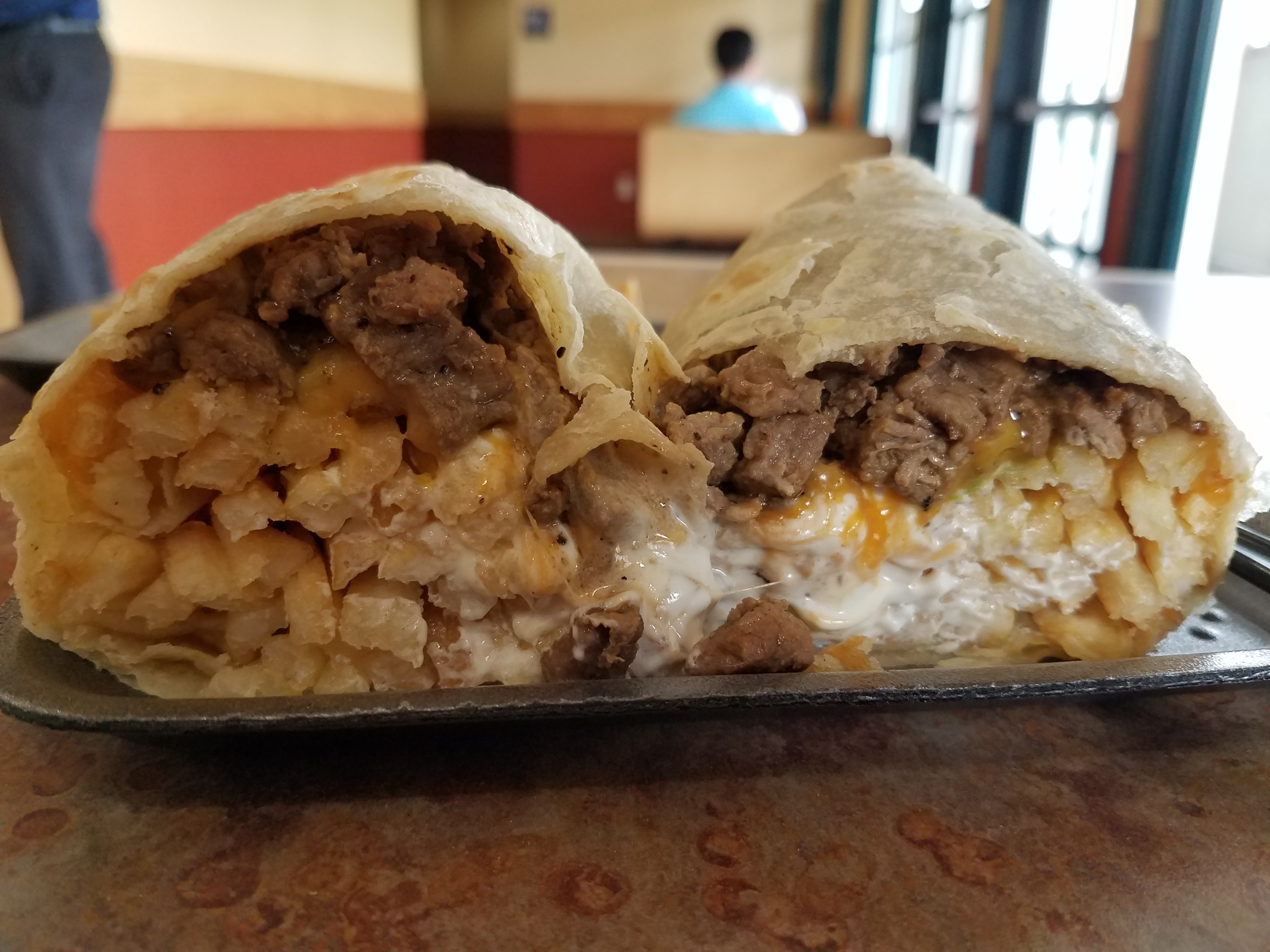
Contents of a California burrito

According to Gustavo Arellano, the California burrito originated at an unknown -berto's named restaurant in San Diego in the 1980s. Lolita's (potentially its Bonita location) has been documented as the place where the California burrito was first created. The Fresh MXN chain (formerly Santana's) also claimed to be the originator of the California burrito. The earliest-known published mention was in a 1995 article in the Albuquerque Tribune. The California burrito typically consists of chunks of carne asada meat, French fries, cheese, and either cilantro, pico de gallo, sour cream, onion, or guacamole (or some combination of these five). The ingredients are similar to those used in the "carne asada fries" dish, and it is considered a staple of the local cuisine of San Diego. With the merging of French fries and more traditional burrito fillings, the California burrito is an example of fusion border food. The California burrito has also been described as a "trans-class" food item, as it is regularly consumed by people across socioeconomic lines. Variants of this burrito may add shrimp (surf and turf), or substitute carnitas (pork) or chicken for carne asada.

The carne asada burrito is considered one of the regional foods of San Diego. Carolynn Carreno has said that to San Diegans, "carne asada burritos are as integral to the experience of the place as a slice of (pizza) pie is to a New Yorker." The San Diego–style carne asada burrito is served with chunks of carne asada, guacamole, and pico de gallo salsa. This "wall-to-wall" use of meat contrasts to burrito styles that use rice and beans as filler ingredients.

=== Los Angeles ===
Los Angeles also has several unique local burrito varieties. The first is the most traditional and is exemplified by the versions at Mexican-American restaurants such as Al & Bea's, Lupe's #2, and Burrito King. These restaurants have often been in existence for decades, and they offer a distinctly Americanized menu compared with the typical taqueria. The burrito of L.A. itself can take multiple forms, but is almost always dominated by some combination of: refried beans, meat (often stewed beef or chili), and cheese (usually cheddar), with rice and other ingredients typical of Mission burritos offered as add-ons, if at all.

The most basic version of this burrito consists of only beans and cheese; beyond this, there are the "green chile" and "red chile" burritos, which may simply mean the addition of chiles or a vegetarian chile sauce to the plain beans (as at Al & Bea's), meat or cheese as well. Rice, again, is rarely included, which, along with the choice of chiles, is one of the style's most defining traits. The menu will then usually go on to list multiple other combinations, such as beef and bean, all-beef, a "special" with further ingredients, etc. If the restaurant also offers hamburgers and sandwiches, it may sell a burrito version of these, such as a "hot dog burrito".

In addition to the version described, Los Angeles is also home to three burrito styles that can be said to fall under the category of Mexican fusion cuisine. The first is the famed "kosher burrito", served since 1946 at its eponymous restaurant at 1st Street and Main in Downtown Los Angeles. Another is the Korean kogi burrito, invented by American chef Roy Choi, the first to combine Mexican and Korean cuisines. The kogi burrito was named the seventh best burrito in Los Angeles in 2012 by the LA Weekly. The kogi burrito is accented with chile-soy vinaigrette, sesame oil, and fresh lime juice. Food writer Cathy Chaplin has said that "this is what Los Angeles tastes like." Finally, there is the sushi burrito, most notably the version sold at the Jogasaki food truck. Wrapped in flour tortillas, sushi burritos include such fillings as spicy tuna, tempura, and cucumber.

The existence of such a large truly Mexican community in Los Angeles also makes it possible to find a variety of authentic burrito dishes from different regions of Mexico, from Oaxaca to Hidalgo.

== Variations and similar dishes ==
- A wet burrito is covered with a red chili sauce similar to a red enchilada sauce, with melted shredded cheese on top. It is usually eaten from a plate using a knife and fork, rather than eaten with the hands. This variety is sometimes called "smothered", "enchilada-style", mojado (Spanish for "wet"), or suizo ("Swiss"; used in Spanish to indicate dishes topped with cheese or cream).

- A burrito bowl is not technically a burrito, despite its name, as unlike a traditional burrito, its ingredients are not wrapped. It consists of burrito-style fillings, typically arranged in a bowl, often with a base of rice. In 2017, a Meal, Ready-to-Eat version of a burrito bowl was introduced.
- A breakfast burrito is composed of breakfast foods from American cuisine, particularly scrambled eggs, wrapped in a flour tortilla. This style was invented and popularized in several regional American cuisines, most notably New Mexican cuisine, Southwestern cuisine, Californian cuisine, and Tex-Mex.
- A chimichanga is a deep-fried burrito popular in Southwestern and Tex-Mex cuisines, and in the Mexican states of Sinaloa and Sonora.
- A taco is similar to a burrito, but is served open rather than closed, is generally smaller, and is often made with corn tortillas rather than wheat tortillas. The taco editor of Texas Monthly argues that burritos are a type of taco.
- Dürüm is a Turkish wrap that is usually filled with typical doner kebab ingredients.

== Gallery ==
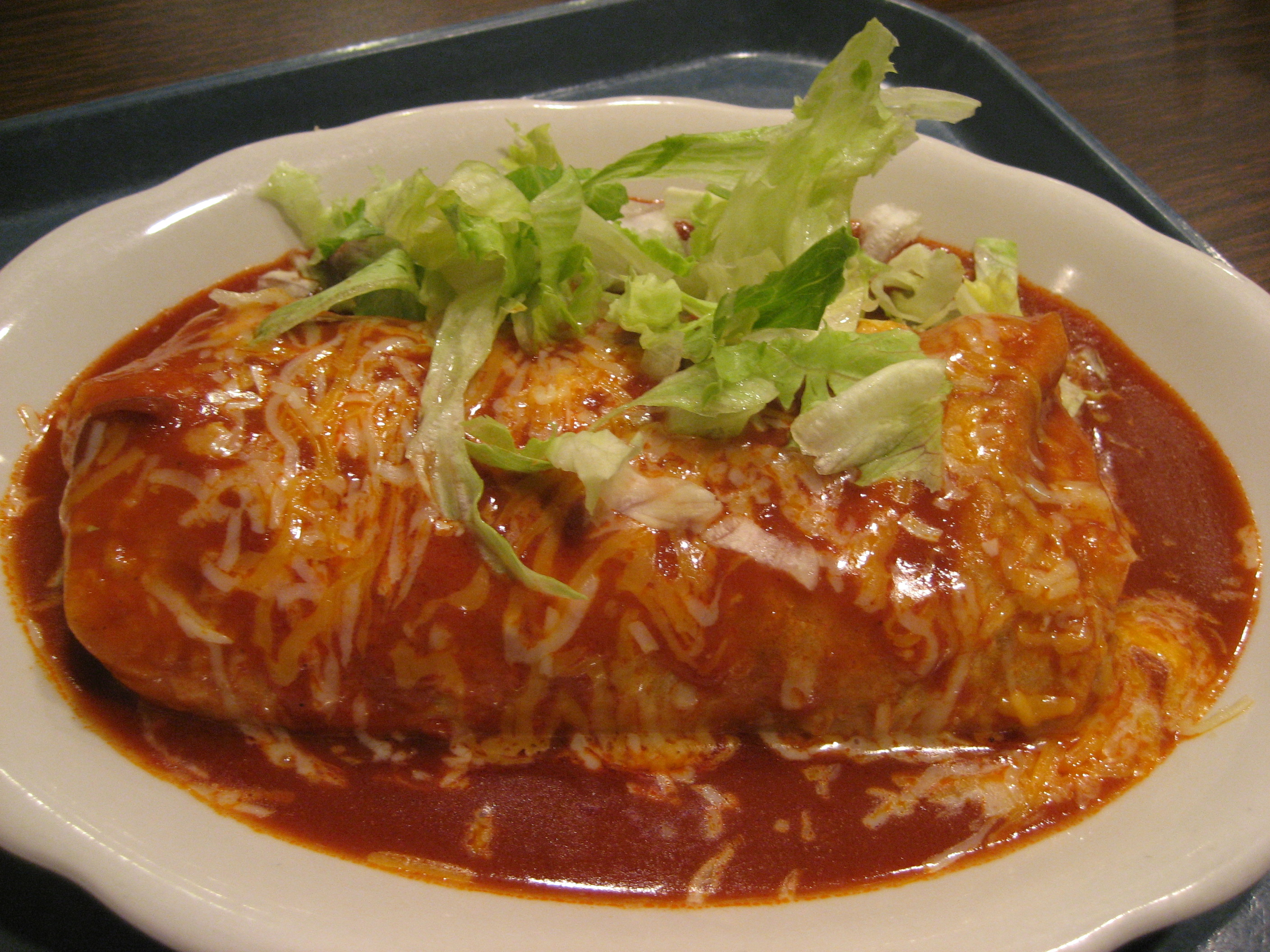
A wet burrito

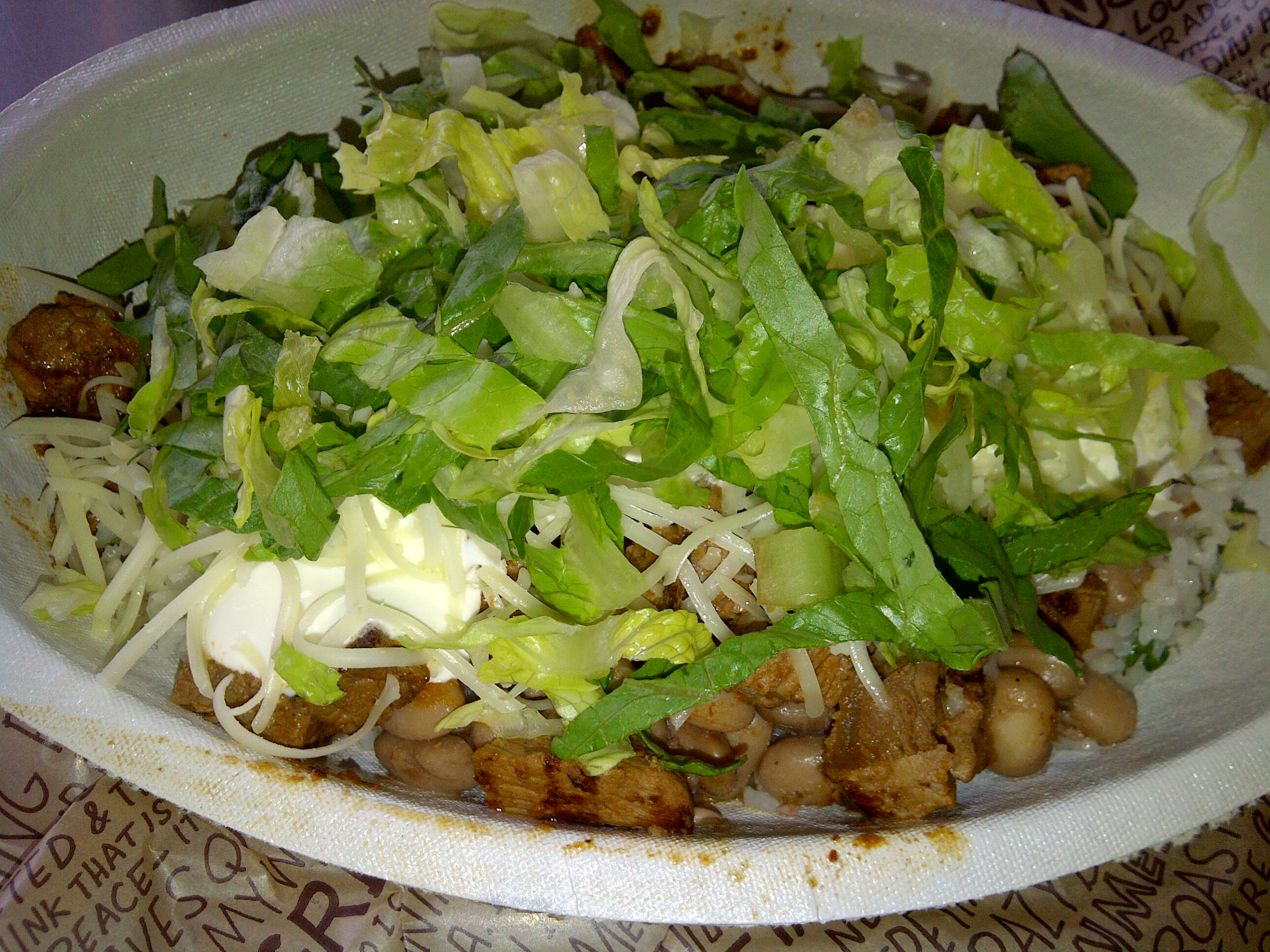
A steak burrito bowl

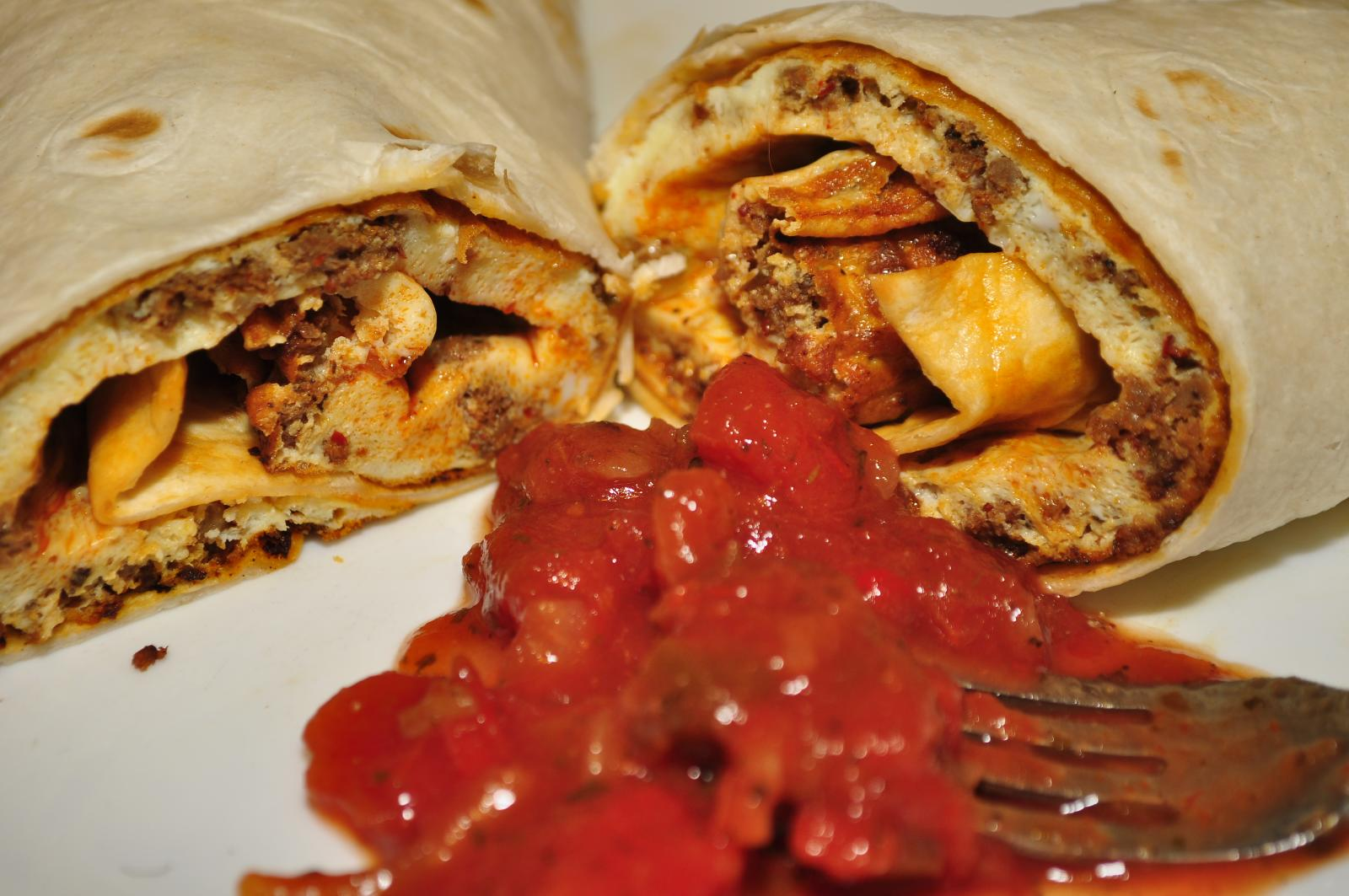
A chorizo-and-egg breakfast burrito with salsa

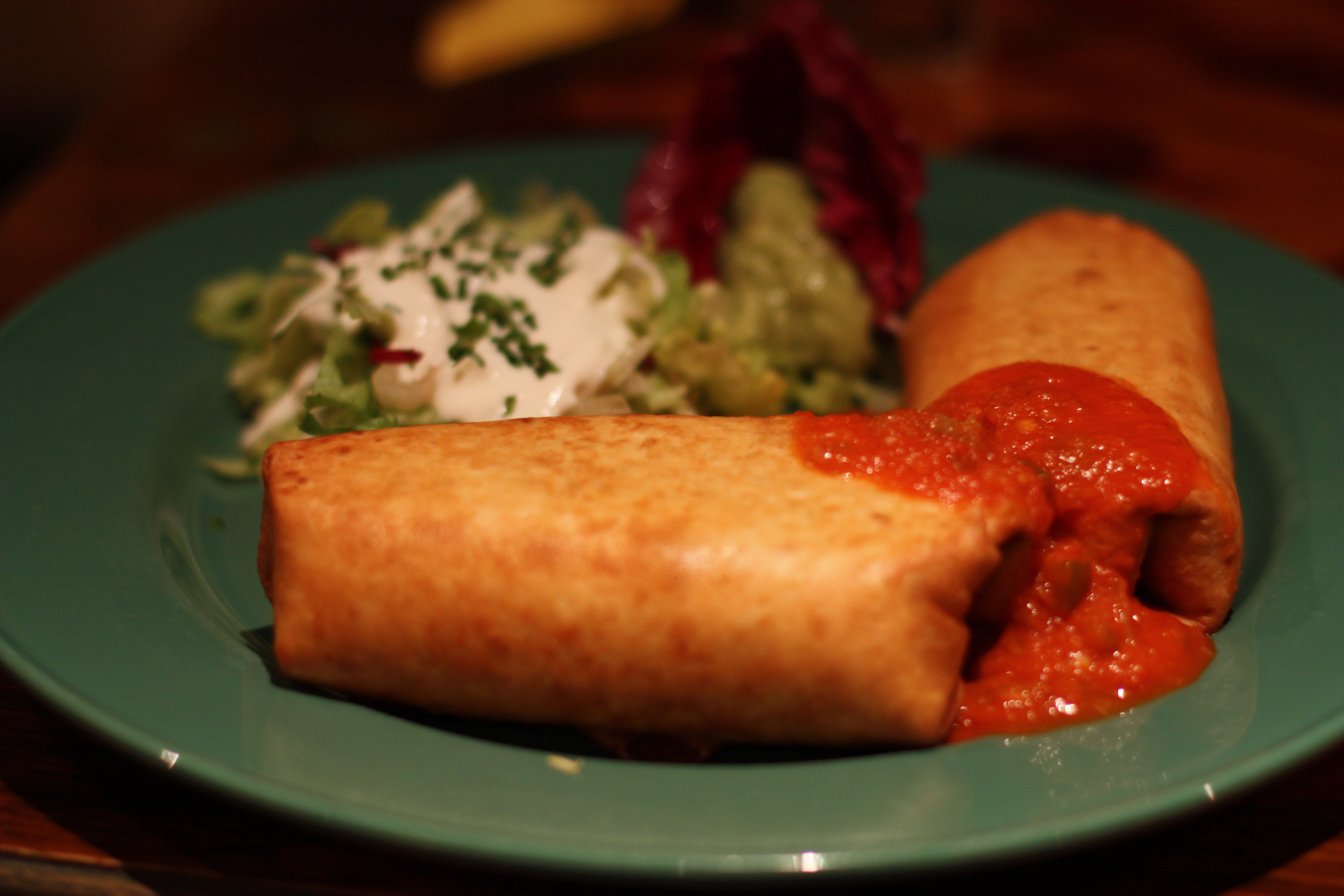
A chimichanga

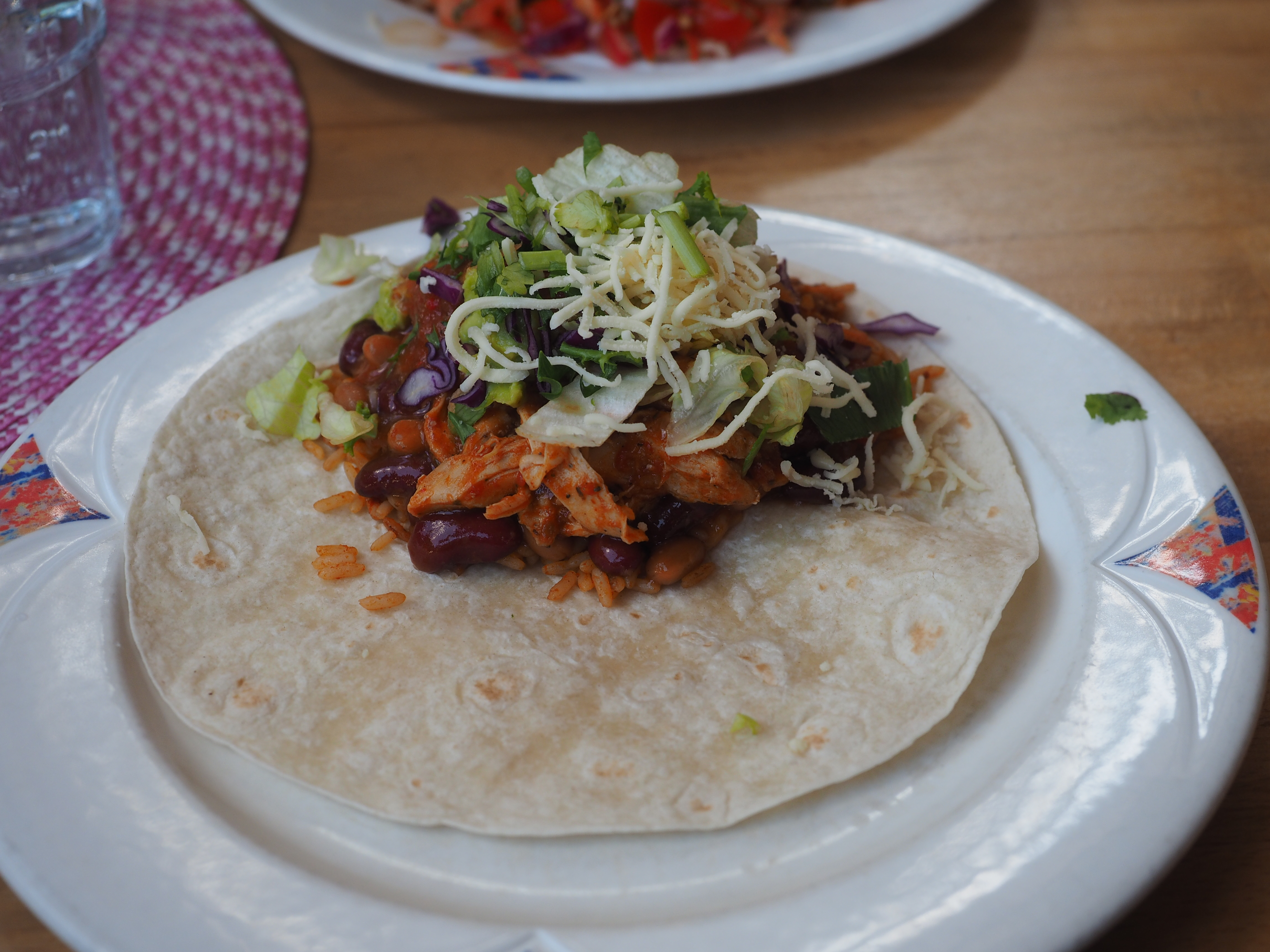
A burrito prior to wrapping

== Research ==
Taco Bell research chef Anne Albertine experimented with grilling burritos to enhance portability. This grilling technique allowed large burritos to remain sealed without spilling their contents. This is a well-known cooking technique used by some San Francisco taquerias and Northern Mexican burrito stands. Traditionally, grilled burritos are cooked on a comal (griddle).

Bean burritos, which are high in protein and low in saturated fat, have been touted for their health benefits. Black bean burritos are also a good source of dietary fiber and phytochemicals.

== See also ==
- French tacos
- Kati roll
- List of Mexican dishes
- List of tortilla-based dishes
- Sushi burrito or sushirrito
- Dürüm
