= Agriculture in Mesoamerica =

Account of archaic North American agriculture

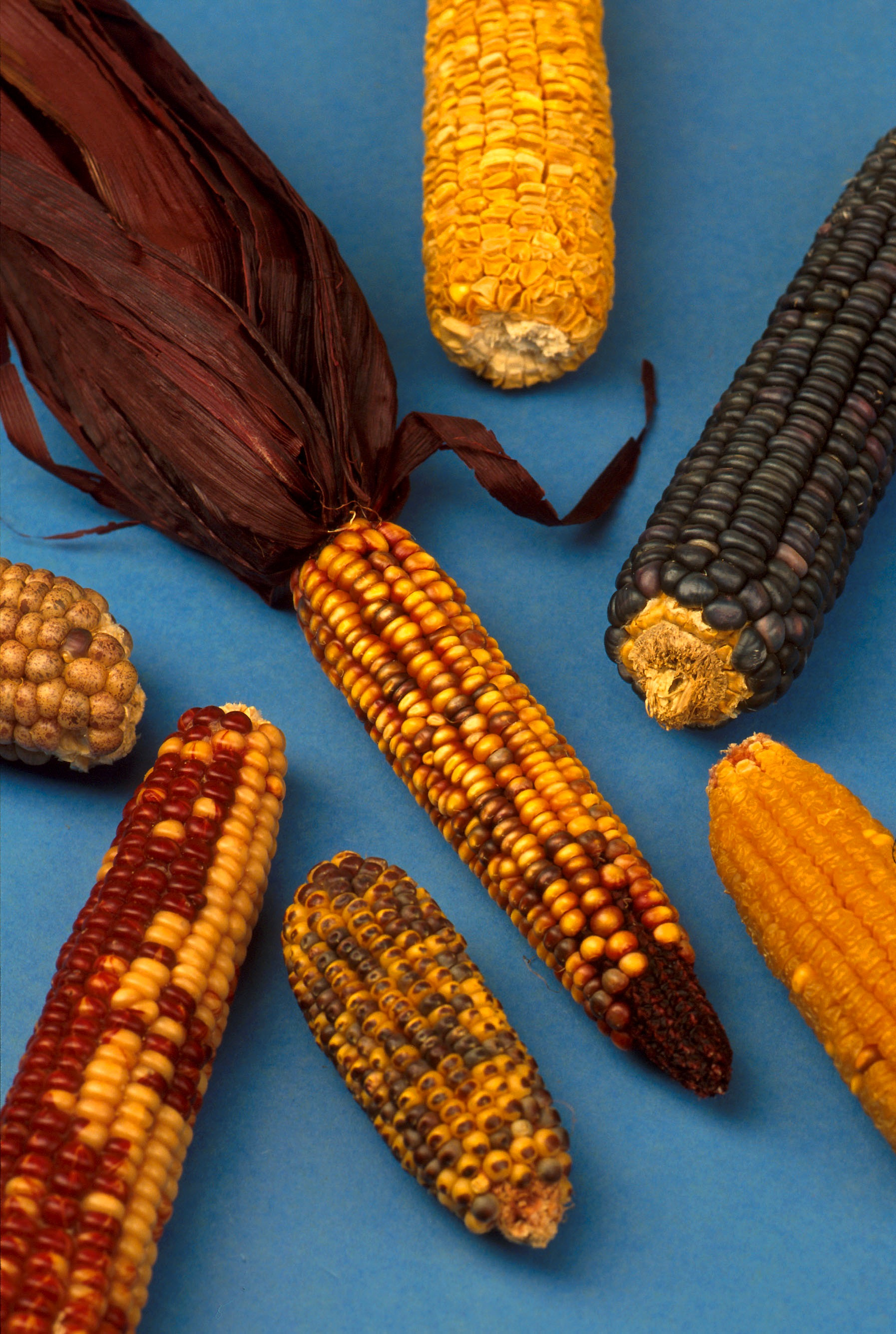
Varieties of maize

Agriculture in Mesoamerica dates to the Archaic period of Mesoamerican chronology (8000–2000 BC). At the beginning of the Archaic period, the Early Hunters of the late Pleistocene era (50,000–10,000 BC) led nomadic lifestyles, relying on hunting and gathering for sustenance. However, the nomadic lifestyle that dominated the late Pleistocene and the early Archaic slowly transitioned into a more sedentary lifestyle as the hunter-gatherer micro-bands in the region began to cultivate wild plants. The cultivation of these plants provided security to the Mesoamericans, allowing them to increase surplus of "starvation foods" near seasonal camps; this surplus could be utilized when hunting was bad, during times of drought, and when resources were low. The cultivation of plants could have been started purposefully, or by accident. The former could have been done by bringing a wild plant closer to a camp site, or to a frequented area, so it was easier to access and collect. The latter could have happened as certain plant seeds were eaten and not fully digested, causing these plants to grow wherever human habitation would take them.

As the Archaic period progressed, cultivation of plant foods became increasingly important to the people of Mesoamerica. The reliability of cultivated plants allowed hunting and gathering micro-bands to establish permanent settlements and to increase in size. These larger settlements required a greater quantity of food, consequently leading to an even greater reliance on domesticated crops. Eventually, the Mesoamerican people established a sedentary lifestyle based on plant domestication and cultivation, supplemented with small game hunting. This sedentary lifestyle reliant on agriculture allowed permanent settlements to grow into villages and provided the opportunity for division of labor and social stratification.

The most important plant in ancient Mesoamerica, was, unarguably, maize. Squash and beans were also important staples of the ancient Mesoamerican agricultural diet and along with maize, are often referred to as the "Three Sisters".

== Early and culturally significant domestic plants ==
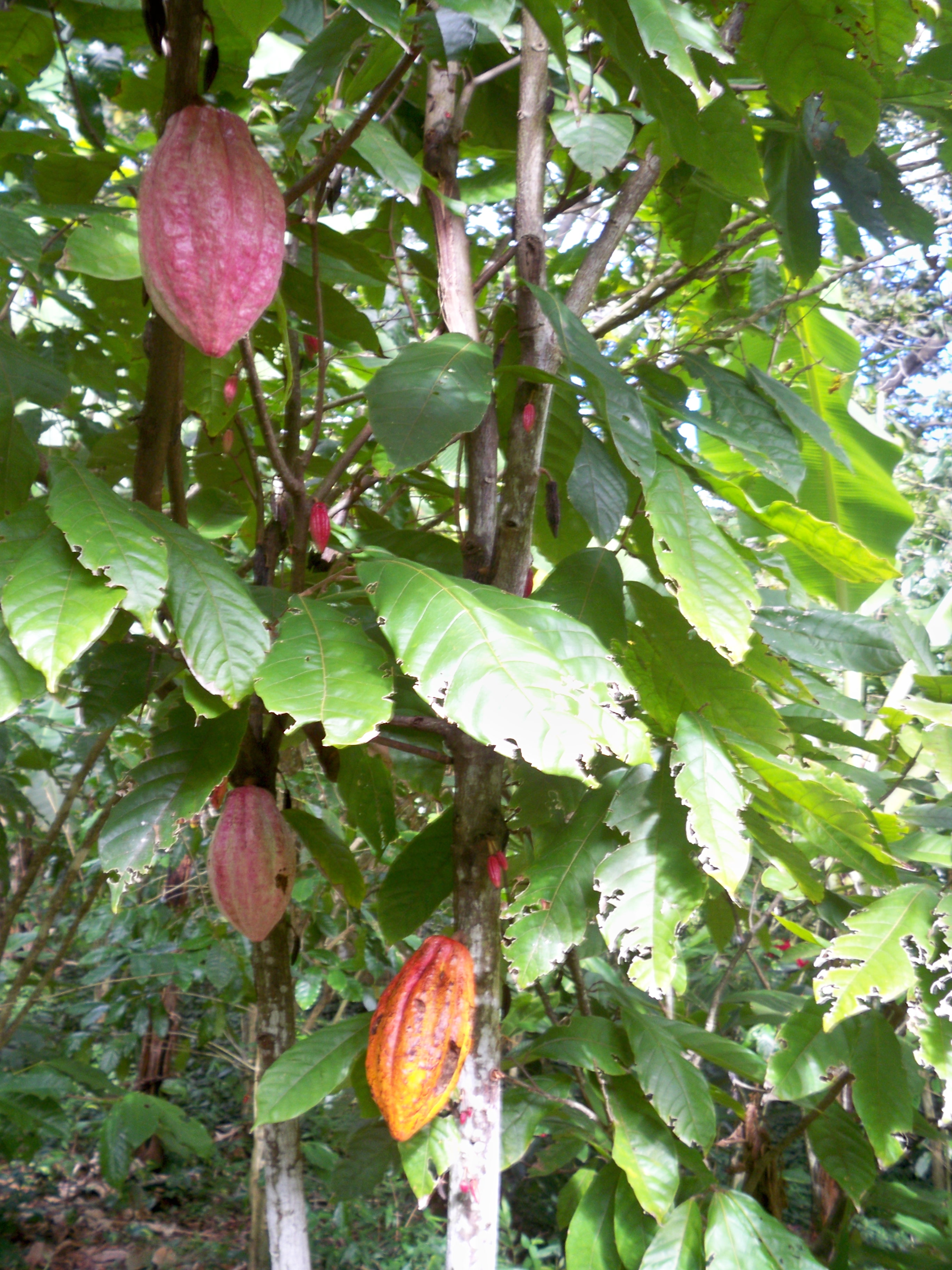
Cacao

Another important crop in Mesoamerican agriculture is squash. Bruce D. Smith discovered evidence of domesticated squash (Cucurbita pepo), in Guilá Naquitz cave in Oaxaca. These finds date back to 8000 BC, the beginning of the Archaic period, and are related to today's pumpkin. Another important squash that was domesticated in the early Archaic period was the bottle gourd (Lagenaria siceraria). The bottle gourd provided storage space for collecting seeds for grinding or planting as well as a means of carrying water. Squashes provided an excellent source of protein to the ancient Mesoamericans, as well as to people today.

Another major food source in Mesoamerica are beans. Maize, beans, and squash form a triad of products, commonly referred to as the "Three Sisters". Growing these three crops together helps to retain nutrients in the soil.

Rubber trees and cotton plants were useful for making culturally significant products such as rubber balls for Mesoamerican ball games and textiles, respectively. Evidence of these ball games is found throughout Mesoamerica, and the performance of these games is related to many origin myths of the Mesoamerican people. The game had a ritualistic significance and was often accompanied with human sacrifice. The domestication of cotton allowed for textiles of vibrant colors to be created. These textiles are evidence of the Mesoamerican peoples' fascination with adornment and the cultural value they placed on appearance.

Another culturally important plant was cacao (ancient Mesoamerican chocolate). Cacao was used in rituals (as a drink) and was also used as currency in trade.

The crops above are only a few of the domesticated plants important to the ancient peoples of Mesoamerica. Please see the section below for a more comprehensive list of ancient Mesoamerican domesticated plants.

== Domestic plants ==
Main source: Pre-Columbian Foodways A list of Mesoamerican cultivars and staples:

1. Agave* – also known as the "century plant"
2. Anona – also called a "custard apple"
3. Avocado* – large, green, egg-shaped berry with a single seed
4. Brosimum alicastrum* – drought-resistant tree used in agroforestry and as a emergency food source
5. Cacao* – the main ingredient in chocolate
6. Cassava* – edible starchy root also known as manioc; also used to make tapioca
7. Chaya – large fast-growing leafy shrub with uses similar to spinach
8. Cherimoya* (fruit)
9. Chicle* (Manilkara chicle) – sap made into chewing gum
10. Chili peppers* – many varieties
11. Copal* – incense used by the Maya for religious practices
12. Cotton* – a shrub that is used mainly to create textiles
13. Epazote* (Dysphania ambrosioides) – aromatic herb
14. Guayaba* – guava fruit
15. Huautli* (Amaranthus cruentus, Amaranthus hypochondriacus) – grain
16. Jícama* (Pachyrhizus erosus)
17. Maize* – domesticated from teosinte grasses in southern Mexico)
18. Mamey sapote* (Pouteria sapota) – fruit, other parts of plants have noted uses
19. Mora (Rubus blackberry)
20. Nopales* – stem segments of Opuntia species, such as Opuntia ficus-indica
21. Papaya* (Carica papaya)
22. Pineapple – cultivated extensively
23. Pinto bean – "painted/speckled" bean; nitrogen-fixer traditionally planted in conjunction with the "two sisters", maize and squash, to help condition soil; runners grew on maize
24. Squash* (Cucurbita spp.) – pumpkins, zucchini, acorn squash, others
25. Strawberry (Fragaria spp.) – various cultivars
26. Sunflower seeds – under cultivation in Mexico and Peru for thousands of years, also source of essential oils
27. Tobacco* – a dried leaf used as a trade commodity and peace-making
28. Tomato* – red berry-type fruit of the family Solanaceae
29. Tunas* – fruits of Opuntia species, also called a "prickly pear"
30. Vanilla – orchids grown for their culinary flavor

* An asterisk indicates a common English or Spanish word derived from an indigenous word.

== Farming techniques ==
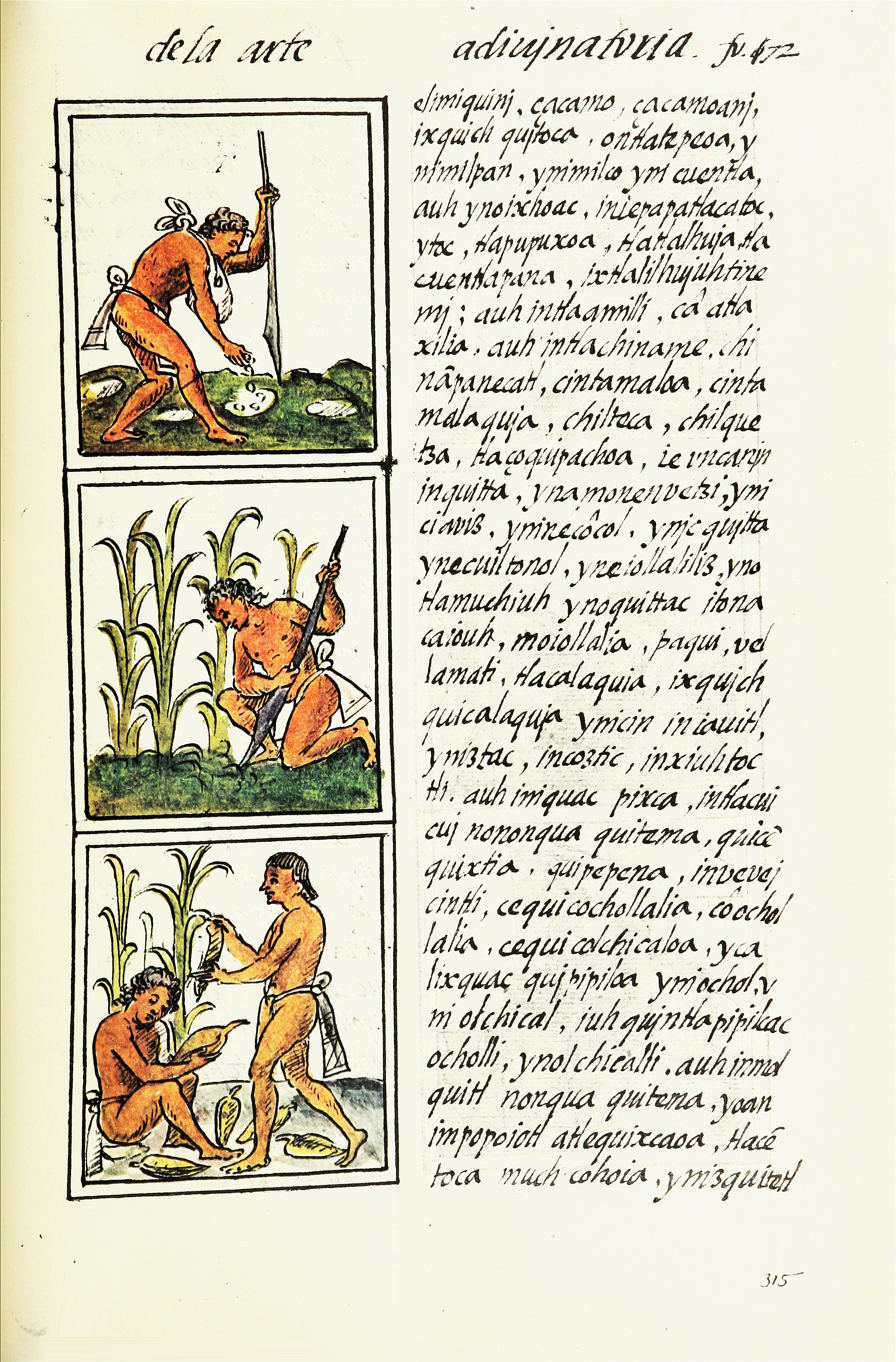
Aztec maize agriculture as depicted in the Florentine Codex

One of the greatest challenges in Mesoamerica for farmers is the lack of usable land, and the poor condition of the soil. The two main ways to combat poor soil quality, or lack of nutrients in the soil, are to leave fields fallow for a period of time in a milpa cycle, and to use slash-and-burn techniques. Much of the Maya food supply was grown in gardens, known as pet kot. The system takes its name from the low wall of stones (pet meaning circular and kot wall of loose stones) that characteristically surrounds the forest garden plot. The earliest dated maize cobs was discovered in Guilá Naquitz cave in Oaxaca and dates back to 4300 BC. Maize arose through domestication of teosinte, which is considered to be the ancestor of maize. The domestication of teosinte was one of the most essential advancements in the history of human life in Central America and Mexico. Maize can be stored for lengthy periods of time, it can be ground into flour, and it easily provides surplus for future use. Maize was vital to the survival of the Mesoamerican people. Its cultural significance is reflected in Mesoamerican origin myths, artwork, and rituals.

The Mesoamerican natives also used irrigation techniques not unlike other early agricultural societies in early Mesopotamia. However, unlike the arid plains of the Fertile Crescent, the Mesoamerican area has a rougher terrain, therefore making irrigation less effective than terraced farming and slash-and-burn techniques.

Slash-and-burn techniques are a type of extensive farming, where the amount of labor is minimal in taking care of farmland. Extensive farming uses less labor but had a larger mark on the area around them. In opposition, intensive agriculture refers to agriculture that involves large amounts of labor, permitting bigger yields from the same land area, thus making it better suited for a sedentary lifestyle.

== See also ==
- Agriculture in Mexico
- Aztec cuisine
- Chinampa
- Guilá Naquitz Cave
- Maya cuisine
- Mesoamerican chronology
