= Milpa =

Mesoamerican crop growing system

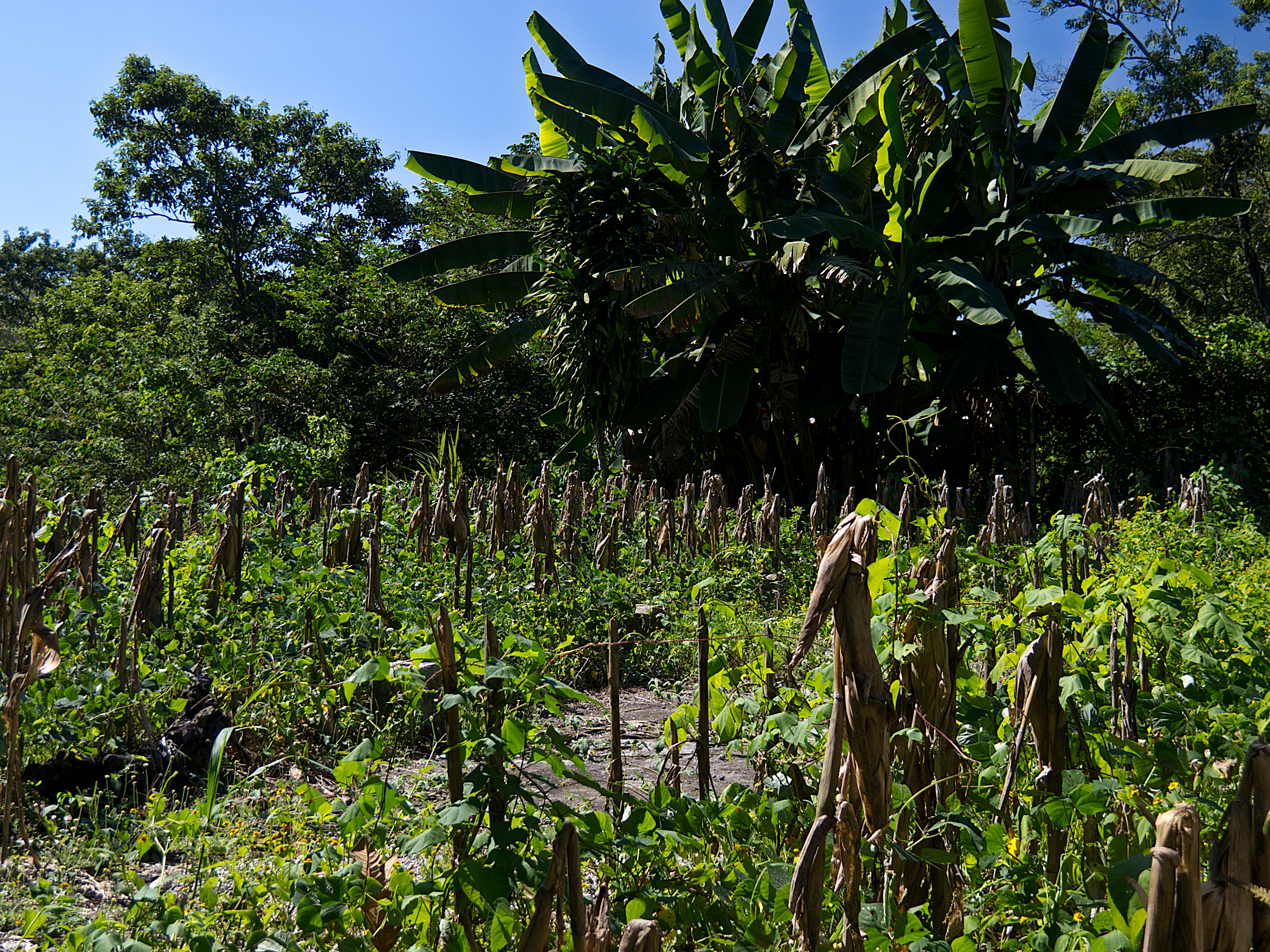
A milpa in Central America. The corn stalks have been bent and left to dry with cobs in place to indicate the planting of other crops.

In agriculture, a milpa is a field for growing food crops and a crop-growing system used throughout Mesoamerica, especially in the Yucatán Peninsula, in Mexico. The word milpa derives from the Nahuatl words milli and pan. Based on the agronomy of the Maya and of other Mesoamerican peoples, the milpa system is used to produce crops of maize, beans, and squash primarily.

The land-conservation cycle of the milpa is two years of cultivation and eight years of laying fallow. In the Mexican states of Jalisco and Michoacán and in central Mexico as well as Guanacaste Province Costa Rica, as an agricultural term milpa denotes a single corn plant; in El Salvador and Guatemala, milpa specifically refers to harvested crop of maize and the field for cultivation.

A milpa is a field, usually but not always recently cleared, in which farmers plant a dozen crops at once including maize, avocados, multiple varieties of squash and bean, melon, tomatoes, chilis, sweet potato, jícama, amaranth, and mucuna ... Milpa crops are nutritionally and environmentally complementary. Maize lacks the amino acids lysine and tryptophan, which the body needs to make proteins and niacin; ... Beans have both lysine and tryptophan ... Squashes, for their part, provide an array of vitamins; avocados, fats. The milpa, in the estimation of H. Garrison Wilkes, a maize researcher at the University of Massachusetts in Boston, "is one of the most successful human inventions ever created."

— Charles C. Mann, 1491: New Revelations of the Americas Before Columbus.

The concept of milpa is a sociocultural construct rather than simply a system of agriculture. It involves complex interactions and relationships between farmers, as well as distinct personal relationships with both the crops and land. For example, it has been noted that "the making of milpa is the central, most sacred act, one which binds together the family, the community, the universe ... [it] forms the core institution of Indian society in Mesoamerica and its religious and social importance often appear to exceed its nutritional and economic importance."

Milpitas, California, derives its name from the Nahuatl term "milpa" followed by the Spanish feminine diminutive plural suffix "-itas".

== See also ==
- Agriculture in Mesoamerica
- Domesticated plants of Mesoamerica
- La Milpa
- Forest gardening
- Inga alley cropping
- Maya diet and subsistence
- Terra preta
- Three Sisters (agriculture) (winter squash, maize (corn), and climbing beans)
- Chapulín de la milpa (Sphenarium purpurascens), a grasshoppers species found in Mexico and Guatemala
- Agroecology
- Controlled burn
- Crop rotation
- Chitemene
- Shifting cultivation
