= Moctezuma's Table =

Western depiction of daily meal of Aztec tlatoani Moctezuma II

Moctezuma's table refers to both the place and the manner in which the Aztec emperor (Tlatoani) ate his food. Important chronologists were witnesses to this daily ritual. One of these, Bernal Díaz del Castillo, extrapolated in his book, The True History of the Conquest of New Spain (Historia verdadera de la conquista de la Nueva España), how the Mexicas specific protocols and etiquette were passed down from one generation to the next. The abundance of typical meals that were found in this daily banquet are largely reflected in today's Mexican cuisine. Moctezuma's table represents more than just Aztec cuisine and the perfection of great eating (buen comer) because it also demonstrates the prerogative that was required to create them. Trade routes and agreements with civilizations bordering Aztec territory were essential in order to have the most delicious and fresh ingredients.

== Typical Dishes on Moctezuma's Table ==
Another chronologist, Fray Francisco de Aguilar, mentions some of the typical meals that were served in this spectacular ritual. A legend exists that Moctezuma II also enjoyed various types of meat, human flesh among them. It is said that he ate the flesh of slaves, youth, women, and children etc. depending on which god the sacrifice was directed towards. Typical food that continues to be part of Mexican culture could be identified from his meals as well, such as: cacao (cocoa), maize, tomato and a large variety of spices (such as vanilla) etc. Among other typical meals were found:

- Corn chips (totopos) with nopal salad
- Sopes with ant larvae (escamoles) in Pasilla chile sauce
- Huitlacoche (corn smut)
- Fruit pieces
- Fresh fish from Veracruz
- Quail
- Deer
- Tlacoyos
- Mushroom soup
- Lowland Paca (Tepezcuintles)
- Algae flatbread
- Snails stewed in an earthen oven
- Grasshoppers in green sauce (salsa verde)
- Corn Tamales
- Sweet Corn bread

== See also ==
- Aztec cuisine
- Mexican cuisine
- Moctezumas II
