= Aztec cuisine =

Culinary traditions in the Aztec Empire

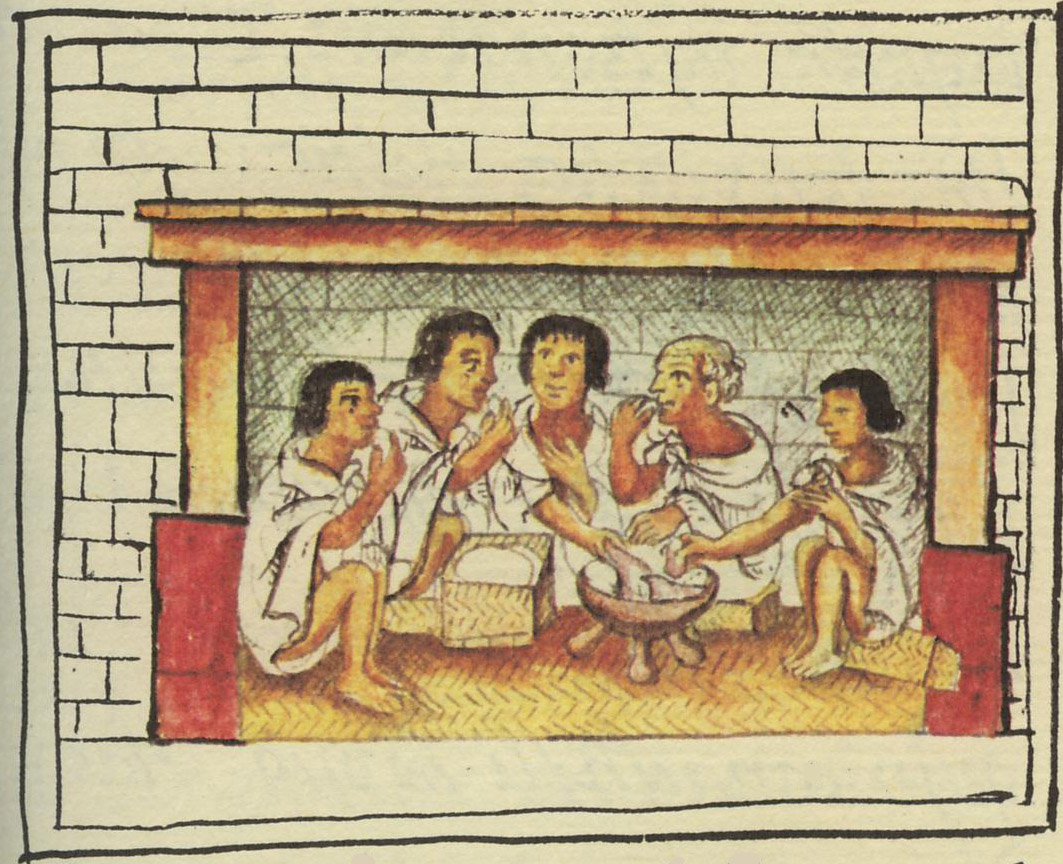
Aztec men sharing a meal. Florentine Codex, late 16th century.

Aztec cuisine is the cuisine of the former Aztec Empire and the Nahua peoples of the Valley of Mexico prior to European contact in 1519.

The most important staple was corn (maize), a crop that was so important to Aztec society that it played a central part in their culture. Just like wheat in much of Europe or rice in most of East Asia, it was the food without which a meal was not a meal. It came in varieties that differed in color, texture, size and prestige, and was eaten as corn tortillas, tamales or ātōlli, maize gruel. The other constants of Aztec food were salt and chili peppers and the basic definition of Aztec fasting was to abstain from these two.

The other major foods were beans, squash and New World varieties of the grains amaranth (or pigweed), and chia. The combination of maize and these basic foods would have provided the average diet.

The cooking of maize grains in alkaline solutions, a process called nixtamalization, significantly raised the nutritional value of the common staple.

Water, maize gruels and pulque (iztāc octli) and the fermented juice of the century plant (maguey in Spanish), were the most common drinks, and there were many different fermented alcoholic beverages made from honey, cacti and various fruits. The elite took pride in not drinking pulque, a drink of commoners, and preferred drinks made from cacao, among the most prestigious luxuries available. Favored by rulers, warriors and nobles, they were flavored with chili peppers, honey and a long list of spices and herbs.

The Aztec diet included a variety of fish and wild game: various fowl, pocket gophers, green iguanas, axolotls (a type of amphibian, much like a salamander), a type of crayfish called acocil, and a great variety of insects, larvae and insect eggs.

They also domesticated turkeys, duck and dogs as food and at times ate meat from larger wild animals such as deer, but none of these were a major part of their diet. They ate various mushrooms and fungi, including the parasitic corn smut, which grows on ears of corn.

Squash (also known as cucurbita) was very popular and came in many different varieties. Squash seeds, fresh, dried or roasted, were especially popular. Tomatoes, though different from the varieties common today, were often mixed with chili in sauces or as filling for tamales.

Eating in Aztec culture could take on a sacred meaning, especially as evidenced in ritual cannibalism. The act of eating another human was deeply connected to the Aztec culture, in which gods needed to consume the sacrificed flesh and blood of humans to sustain themselves, and the world.

One way to look at this is that since human flesh was a food of the gods, it was sacred, and consuming sacred food could sanctify an individual and bring him or her closer to the gods. Further, certain warriors, in their afterlife, were believed to have been turned into butterflies and hummingbirds with the ability to fly back to the realm of the living to feed on nectar. From this, the importance the Aztecs ascribed to the act of eating is clear.

== Meals ==
Most sources describe two meals per day, though there is an account of laborers getting three meals, one at dawn, another one at around 9 in the morning, and one at around 3 in the afternoon. This is similar to the custom in contemporary Europe, but it is unclear if intake of ātōlli, a gruel of nixtamalized maize, was considered a meal or not. Drinking a good amount of the thicker kinds of ātōlli could equal the calories in several corn tortillas, and ātōlli was consumed on a daily basis by most of the population.

=== Feasts ===
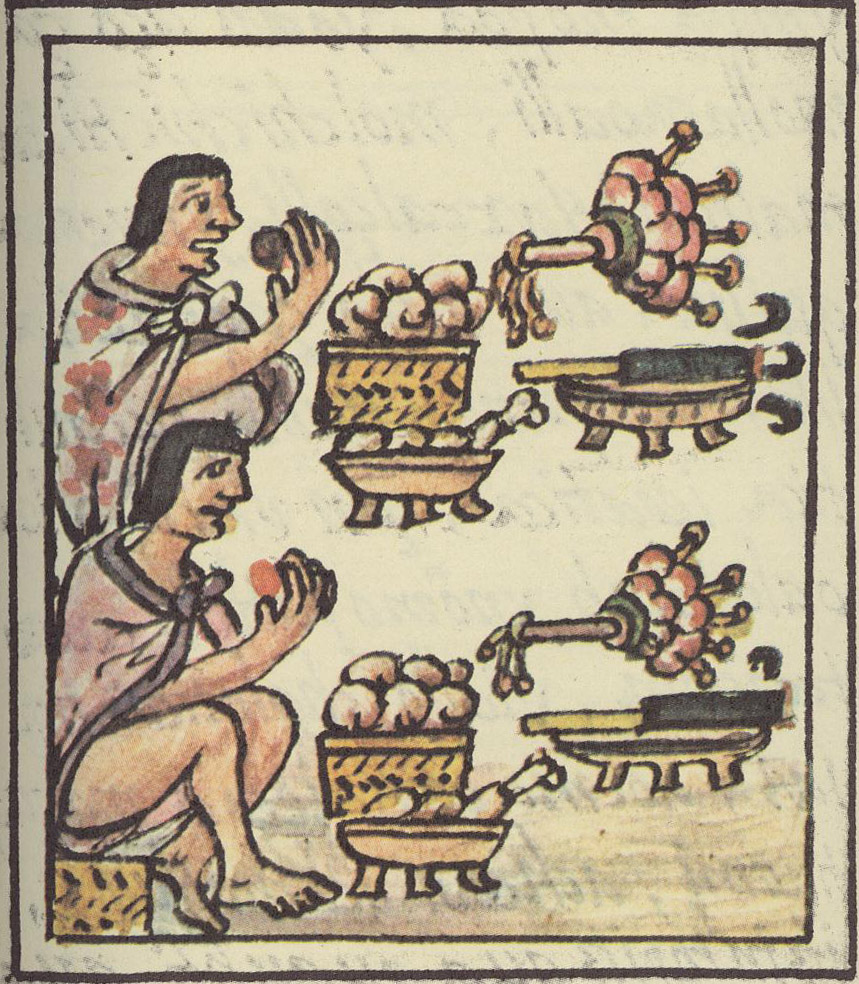
Aztec men at a feast. Florentine Codex.

Many accounts exist of Aztec feasts and banquets and the ceremony that surrounded them. Before a meal, servants presented fragrant tobacco tubes and sometimes also flowers with which the guests could rub their head, hands, and neck. Before the meal would start each guest would drop a little food on the ground as an offering to the god Tlaltecuhtli.

As military prowess was highly praised among the Aztecs, table manners imitated the movement of warriors. The smoking tubes and flowers went from the left hand of the servant to the right hand of the guest and the plate accompanying the smoking tube went from the right hand to the left hand.

This was an imitation of how a warrior received his atlatl darts and shield. The flowers passed out bore different names depending on how they were handed out; "sword flowers" went from left hand to hand to left. When eating, guests would hold their individual bowls filled with dipping sauce in the center of the right hand and then dip corn tortillas or tamales (which were served from baskets) with the left. The meal was concluded by serving chocolate, often served in a calabash cup along with a stirring stick.

Rich hosts could often receive guests sitting in rooms around an open courtyard similar to Caravanserais and senior military men would perform dances. Festivities would begin at midnight and some would drink chocolate and eat hallucinogenic mushrooms so that they could tell about their experiences and visions to the other guests.

Right before dawn singing commenced and offerings were burned and buried in the courtyard to ensure the fortune of the children of the hosts. At dawn, the remaining flowers, smoking tubes and food were given to the old and poor that had been invited, or to the servants.

As with all other aspects of life, the Aztecs stressed the dual nature of all things, and toward the end of the banquet the host would be sternly reminded by his elders of his own mortality and that he should not be overcome with pride.

==== Domestic feasts ====
The Aztecs private feasts included music singing, storytelling, dancing, incense burning, flowers, tobacco, offerings, and gift-giving. Aztec feasts were a display of material culture and wealth—notes by Friar Bernardino de Sahagún and Friar Diego Durán describe Aztec feasts as events where "everything was to be created in abundance". Feasts were organized to the point of ritual, there were roles and relationships displayed and reinforced. Hosts needed to meet the obligations of banqueting, in order not to "offend" their guests, and guests needed to reinforce the hosts' stature.

There are multiple important events in Aztec society that called for feasts. Child naming ceremonies involved the ritual calling out of the baby's name and progressed into a large organized feast. This feast could consist of dressed bird or dog, meat and/or maize tamales, beans, cacao bean, and roasted chillis.

Izcalli child presentation ceremonies were also important, part of the Aztec agricultural calendar. Izcalli was the last month of the calendar. Every fourth Izcalli celebration included the introduction of children, born during this four-year period, to the Aztec community. This feast introduced the child to actions important to their religious life such as singing, dancing, ceremonial drinking, sacrificial bloodletting, and body modification.

The food served during this feast was traditionally spicy. Noted by Sahagun was: "And the sauce of the tamales was called 'red chilli sauce'. And when the good common folk ate, they sat about sweating, they sat about burning themselves. And the tamales stuffed with greens were indeed hot, gleaming hot." The wedding process also contained many ceremonies, the parents of a young male, when marriage was desired, had to ask permission of his calmecac school leaders.

Part of this process was a feast of tamales, chocolate, and sauces. During the wedding itself, there were feasts of pulque, tamales, and turkey meat. Funerary feasts were also common among the wealthy class. Served at these feasts was octli (pulque), chocolate, bird, fruit, seeds, and other foods.

==== Public feasts ====
Parts of the 260-day ritual calendar of the Aztecs were veintena. Veintena can be approximated as months, however, they are more aptly described as 20-day public ceremony periods. Each 20-day veintena was a full and complex festival made up of ceremonies dedicated to specific gods and deities of the current veintena.

Regional and local ceremonies differed in deities and methods from the official state-sponsored ones at Tenochtitlan. Food was an important part of veintena ceremonies; it was both consumed and adorned by priests. It was noted that during the ceremonies honoring Xipe Totec the priests would adorn themselves in arrays of "butterfly nets, fish banners, ear of maize, coyote heads made of amaranth seed, tortillas, thick rolls covered with a dough of amaranth seeds, toasted maize, red amaranth, and maize stalks with ears of green or tender maize."

In the ceremonies honouring Mixcoatl, after a "great hunt," Aztecs would feast on deer, rabbit, and all other animals killed in the hunt. Hunting was also important to celebrations dedicated to Xiuhtecuhtli when Aztec boys and young men would hunt for ten days. The products of these hunts would then be turned over to priests, who cooked them in large fire flies.

== Food preparation ==
The main method of preparation was boiling or steaming in two-handled clay pots or jars called xoctli in Nahuatl and translated into Spanish as olla (pot). Ceramics were vital to the cooking process and served at least three major purposes: nixtamal preparation, tamale steaming, and cooking beans, stews, and hot beverages. The xoctli was filled with food and heated over a fire. It could also be used to steam food by pouring a little water into the xoctli and then placing tamales wrapped in maize husks on a light structure of twigs in the middle of the pot.

Tortillas, tamales, casseroles and the sauces that went with them were the most common dishes. Chili and salt were both ubiquitous and the most basic meal was usually just corn tortillas that were dipped in chilis that had been ground in a mortar with a little water. The dough could be used to encase meat, sometimes even whole turkeys, before cooking.

In major Aztec towns and cities there were vendors that sold street food of all kinds, catering to both the rich and poor. Other than ingredients and prepared food every imaginable type of ātōlli could be bought, either to quench one's thirst or as an instant meal in liquid form.

Women, in charge of domestic duties in Aztec societies, were also the cooks. Generally, men did not directly participate in cooking. Based on where cooking tools are usually found, it seems that kitchens were a simple, single-room structure separate from the house itself. Most cooking probably took place on a small triangular hearth in the kitchen.

=== Kitchen tools ===
Most information regarding Aztec cooking tools comes from finding the tools themselves, as depictions of the tools in art are rare, and when they are featured, they aren't particularly prominent or detailed. Luckily, tools were most often made of stone and ceramics and as such can be found in large quantities in good condition for study.

Manos and metates were the tools of choice for grinding nixtamalized maize (nixtamal). It was also used to grind sauce ingredients like peppers, though different sets of manos and metates would likely have been used to avoid getting other flavors in maize dough (masa).

The metate is a stone slab that can be slightly concave. Nixtamal was placed on top of the metate and the mano, effectively a rough cylindrical stone, was rolled over it, grinding the nixtamal.

The mano and metate were tools that would have been used every day, since ground nixtamal usually goes bad within a day.

Ethnographies of 20th-century indigenous communities seem to indicate that women could have spent between four and eight hours a day at a metate grinding nixtamal, but women in a 2007 study at Xaltocan insisted that an experienced woman could grind all she needed for the day in only an hour; regardless, use of a metate for grinding is considered tedious work.

The mano and metate remained as the grinding tool of choice in central Mexico, as it tends to grind finer than European-style mills, and tortillas made from masa ground on a mano and metate are still considered of a higher quality, if much more labor-intensive. However, some argue that the reason women used to and still do grind nixtamal by hand is because it was a way for men to limit the amount of free time women have in an effort to prevent extramarital affairs.

The molcajete is another grinding tool. It is a bowl made of porous basalt rock, and an accompanying basalt cylinder was used to grind foods into the molcajete. It looks and functions very similarly to a western mortar and pestle. The fact that a molcajete will hold whatever is prepared in it means it would have been ideal for preparing sauces that would spill off the sides of a metate, and molcajetes could also be used as serving vessels.

Comals are a type of ceramic griddle with a smooth top and a porous bottom used for cooking various types of tortillas, as well as for non-maize foods like peppers and roasted squash. It is possible that comales could also have been used as makeshift pot lids for the sake of convenience.

There are several references to frying in the accounts of Spanish chroniclers, but the only specification of the Aztec type of frying appears to be some kind of cooking that was done with syrup, not cooking fat. This is corroborated by the fact that no evidence for large-scale extraction of vegetable oils exist and that no cooking vessels suited for frying have been found by archaeologists.

== Foods ==
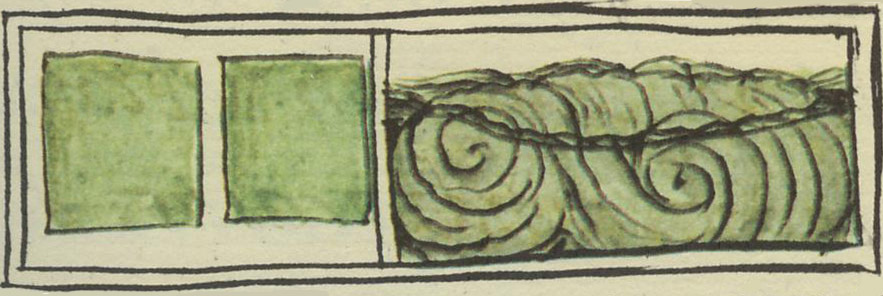
Spirulina could be harvested off the surface of lakes with nets or shovels and was then dried as cakes which could be eaten with corn tortilla or as a condiment.

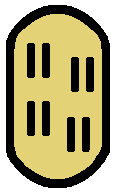
This drawing is a remake of the corn tortilla glyph found in the Codex Mendoza

Aztec staple foods included maize, beans and squash to which were often added chilis, nopales and tomatoes, all prominent parts of the Mexican diet to this day. They harvested acocils, a small and abundant crayfish of Lake Texcoco, as well as Spirulina algae, which was made into a sort of cake called tecuitlatl and was rich in flavonoids. Although the Aztecs' diet was mostly vegetarian, the Aztecs consumed insects such as grasshoppers chapulín [t͡ʃaˈpolin] (singular) or chapulines [t͡ʃapoˈlimeʔ] (plural), maguey worm, ants, larvae, etc. Insects have a higher protein content than meat, and even now they are considered a delicacy in some parts of Mexico.

=== Cereals ===
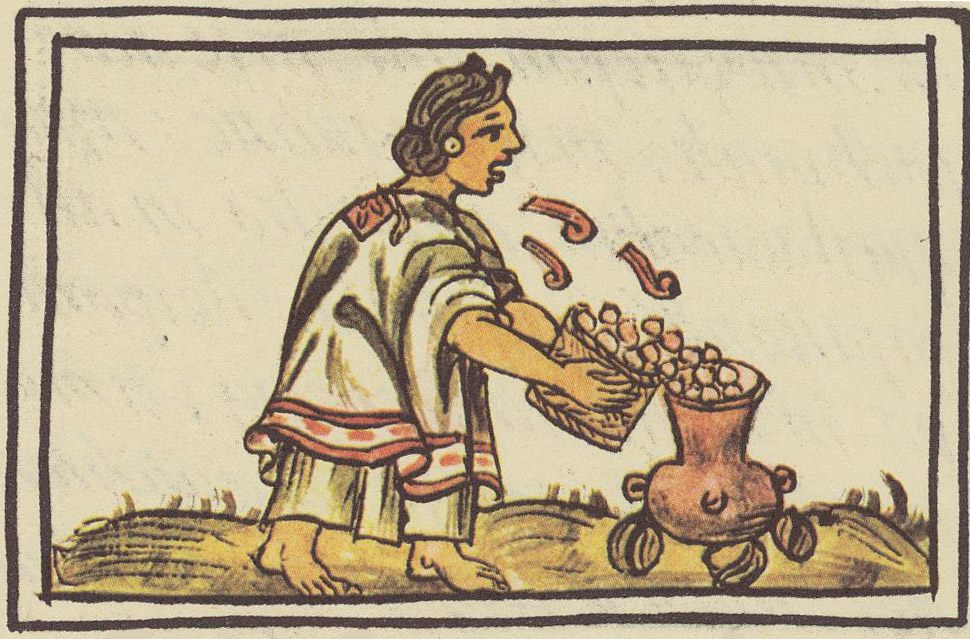
An Aztec woman blowing on maize before putting it in the cooking pot, so that it will not "fear the fire" since it is considered a god. Florentine Codex, late 16th century.

Maize was the single most important staple of the Aztecs. It was consumed at every meal by all social classes and played a central role in Aztec culture. To some of the first Europeans, the Aztecs described maize as "precious, our flesh, our bones".

It came in a vast number of varieties of various sizes, shapes, and colors; yellow, reddish, white with stripes of color, black, with or without speckles, and a blue-husked variant that was considered to be particularly precious. Other local and regional varieties must have also existed but few were recorded. Maize was revered to such an extent that women blew on maize before putting it into the cooking pot so that it would not fear the fire, and any maize that was dropped on the ground was picked up rather than wasted. One of the Aztec informants of the Spanish Franciscan missionary and chronicler Bernardino de Sahagún explained the practice in the following way:

Our sustenance suffers, it lies weeping. If we should not gather it up, it would accuse us before our Lord. It would say: O our Lord, this vassal picked me not up when I lay scattered on the ground. Punish him. Or perhaps we should starve.

A process called nixtamalization was used all over America where maize was the staple. The word is a compound of the Nahuatl words next ("ashes") and tamalli ("unformed corn dough; tamal"), and the process is still in use today. Dry maize grain is soaked and cooked in an alkaline solution, usually limewater. This releases the pericarp, the outer hull of the grains, and makes the maize easier to grind.

The process transforms maize from a simple source of carbohydrates into a considerably more complete nutritional package; it increases the amount of calcium, iron, copper, zinc that are added through the alkalide or the vessel used in the process and niacin, riboflavin and more protein already present in the corn that is not digestible to humans are made available through the process.

The inhibited growth of certain mycotoxins (toxic fungi) is another benefit of nixtamalization. If the processed maize, the nextamalli, is allowed to ferment, further nutrients, including amino acids such as lysine and tryptophan are made available.

Together with beans, vegetables, fruit, chilis and salt nixtamalized corn can form a balanced diet.

=== Herbs and Spices ===
A great number of herbs and spices were available to the Aztecs in seasoning food. Among the most important, chili peppers come in a wide variety of species and cultivars, some domesticated and many of them wild. These included a great range of heat intensity depending on the amount of capsaicin present, with some being mild and others being very piquant.

The chilis were often dried and ground for storage and use in cooking, some roasted beforehand to impart different tastes. Flavors varied significantly from one type to another, including sweet, fruity, earthy, smoky, and fiery hot.

Several native species of plants used as seasonings produced flavors similar to Old World spices that were introduced after the Spanish conquest. Pápalos and culantro (Mexican coriander) provide a much stronger flavor than their Old World parallel, cilantro. Mexican oregano and Mexican anise likewise produce flavors reminiscent of their Mediterranean counterparts, while allspice has an aroma somewhere in between nutmeg, cloves, and cinnamon.

The bark of canella or white cinnamon has a soft, delicate flavor that might have eased the acceptance of the more pungent cinnamon of Ceylon into modern Mexican cuisine.

Before the arrival of onions and garlic, subtler but similar wild plants such as Kunth's onion and other southern-ranging species of the genus Allium, as well as the fragrant leaves of garlic vine may have been used.

Other flavorings available included mesquite, vanilla, achiote, epazote, hoja santa, popcorn flower, avocado leaf, and other indigenous plants.

== Drink ==
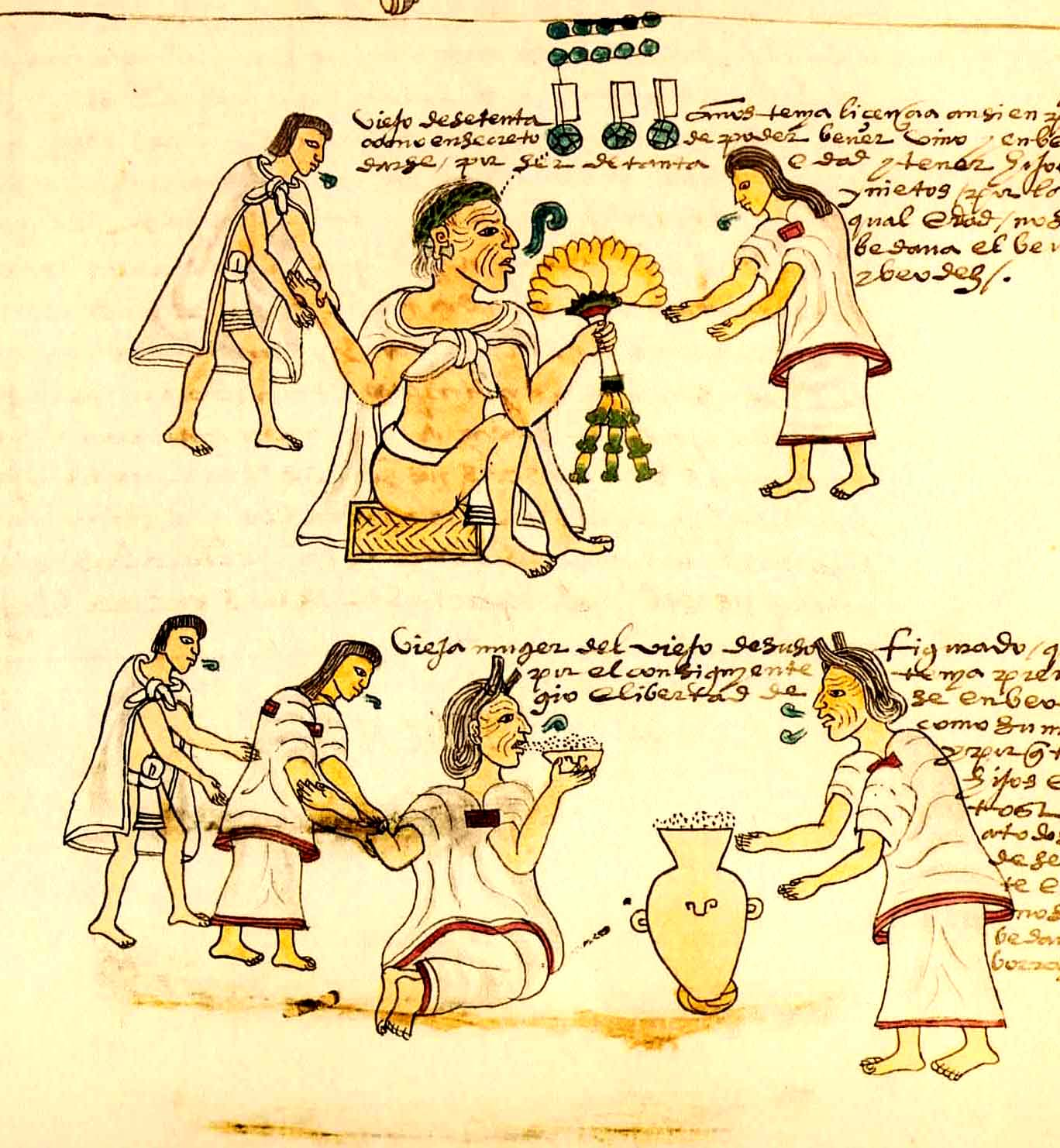
A painting from Codex Mendoza showing an elderly Aztec woman drinking pulque.

=== Alcohol ===
Many different alcoholic beverages were made from fermented maize, honey, pineapple, cactus fruit and other plants. The most common was octli which was made from maguey sap. It is today known as pulque, an Antillean term. It was drunk by all social classes, though some nobles made a point of not downing such a humble beverage. Drinking was tolerated, even for children at some occasions, but becoming intoxicated was not. The penalties could be very stiff, and were stricter for the elite.

The first transgression of a commoner would be punished by tearing his house down and sending him off to live in the field like an animal. A noble would generally not get a second chance and could be executed for overindulging in alcohol. Getting intoxicated appeared to have been more tolerated for elderly people; Spanish translations of the Codex Mendoza note that there were specific circumstances that allowed the elderly to get intoxicated:

It is shown how, according to the laws and customs of the lose of seventy years of age, man or woman, if such old persons had children or grandchildren. These had license and freedom to use it.

This did not prevent the occasional tragedy of nobles who became alcoholics and drank themselves into poverty, squalor and an early death. An informant of Sahagún told the sad story of a former tlacateccatl, a general and commander of over 8,000 troops:

He drank up all his land; he sold it all ... Tlacateccatl, a valiant warrior, a great warrior, and a great nobleman, sometimes, somewhere on the road where there was travel, lay fallen, drunk, wallowing in ordure.

=== Ātōle ===
Ātōle ([aːˈtoːlːi]), maize gruel, accounted for a considerable amount of the daily calorie intake. The basic recipe for ātōle was eight parts water and six parts maize with lime that was cooked until it softened and then ground. The mixture was then boiled until it thickened.

There were many variations of ātōle: a mixture of 1/10 maguey syrup made nequātōle; adding chili ground with salt and tomato would make iztac ātōle; letting maize dough sour for 4–5 days and then adding more fresh dough with chili and salt would make xocoātōle.

Beans, baked corn tortillas with the crust cut off, toasted maize, chia, amaranth and honey could also be added and there was pinolli, ground toasted maize that was carried by travelers in sacks which could be mixed with water on the road for an instant meal.

=== Cacao ===
Cacao had immense symbolic value. It was a rare luxury and an import that could not be grown within the boundaries of the Aztec Empire. There are no detailed descriptions of how cacao solids were prepared, but there are a number of allusions to the fact that it was eaten in some form.

Cacao beans were among the most valuable commodities and could be used as a form of payment, although of somewhat low value; 80-100 beans could be used to buy a small mantle or a canoe-full of fresh water if one lived on the salty part of the lakes around Tenochtitlan. Nevertheless, beans were frequently counterfeited by filling empty cacao shells with dirt or mud.

Cacao was commonly drunk as a beverage named cacahuatl, "cacao water", and was the beverage of warriors and nobles. It was considered a potent intoxicant and something that was drunk with great solemnity and gravity and was described as something "not drunk unthinkingly" by the Spanish chronicler Sahagún.

Chocolate could be prepared in a huge variety of ways and most of them involved mixing hot or tepid water with toasted and ground cacao beans, maize and any number of flavorings such as chili, honey, vanilla and a wide variety of spices.

The ingredients were mixed and beaten with a beating stick or aerated by pouring the chocolate from one vessel to another. If the cacao was of high quality, this produced a rich head of foam. The head could be set aside, the drink further aerated to produce another head, which was also set aside and then placed on top of the drink along with the rest of the foam before serving.

== Dietary norms ==
The Aztecs stressed moderation in all aspects of life. European authors and chroniclers were often impressed by what they perceived as exemplary frugality, simplicity and moderation. Juan de Palafox y Mendoza, the bishop of Puebla and viceroy of New Spain in the 1640s reported:

I have seen them eat with great deliberation, silence, and modesty, so that one knows that the patience shown in all of their habits is shown in eating as well, and they do not allow themselves to be rushed by hunger or the urge to satisfy it.

=== Fasting ===
The primary meaning of an Aztec fast was to abstain from salt and chilis, and all members of Aztec society engaged in fasting to some extent. There were no regular exceptions from the fast, something that shocked the first Europeans who came into contact with the Aztecs. Though fasting was common in Europe, there were permanent exceptions for women and small children, the sick or frail, and the elderly. Before the New Fire Ceremony, which occurred every fifty-two years, some priests fasted for a whole year; other priests fasted for eighty days and lords for eight days.

Commoners also engaged in fasts, but less rigorously. There was also a permanent contingent of fasters in Tehuacán. Along with various ascetic rigors such as sleeping on a stone pillow, they fasted for periods of four years on one 50-gram (1.8 oz) corn tortilla per day, with only one respite every twenty days during which they were allowed to eat whatever they wished.

Even rulers such as Moctezuma II were expected to cut down on their otherwise luxurious lifestyle and did so with considerable conviction and effort. At times, he abstained from luxuries and sex and ate only cakes of michihuauhtli (a type of amaranth), amaranth seeds, and goosefoot. Chocolate was also replaced with water mixed from parched bean powder. Aztec fasting can be contrasted with the fasts of many European nobles and clergy, which, while obeying the letter of the religious regulation by replacing meat and other animal products with fish, were still luxurious feasts in their own right.

During the fourteenth month of Quecholli, ceremonies in honor of the hunting god Mixcōhuātl would involve a large hunt as part of the ritual. To prepare for the hunt, Aztecs would fast for five days. The fasting was done, according to 16th century eyewitness Sahagún, "for the deer, so that it would be a successful hunt."

During the celebrations of the god Tēzcatlīpohca, his priests fasted for ten, five, or seven days continuously before the main feasts. They were known as "those who do penance."

During celebrations of Huītzilōpōchtli, it was noted by Friar Diego Durán: "I have been assured that they became so weak because of the terrible eight-day fast that for another eight days they were not themselves, nor were they satisfied with eating. Many became gravely ill, and the lives of many pregnant women were in danger."

During festivals in honor of Chicomecōātl, there would be drastic alternations between gorging and fasting, so much so that people would become ill.

== Food and politics ==
Bernal Diaz del Castillo comments on how the ruler of Tenochtitlan was served food:

His cooks had more than thirty styles of dishes made according to their fashion and usage, and they put them on small low clay braziers so that they would not get cold ... if it was cold they made him a fire of glowing coals made from the bark of certain trees ... the odor of the bark ... was most fragrant ... they put the tablecloths of white fabric ... They served him on Cholula pottery, some red and some black ... and from time to time they brought him some cups of fine gold, with a certain drink made of cacao.

Sahagún provides a list of the different types of tlaquetzalli, a chocolate drink served to Aztec lords:

The ruler was served his chocolate, with which he finished [his repast] - green, made of tender cacao; honeyed chocolate made with ground-up dried flowers - with green vanilla pods; bright red chocolate; orange-colored chocolate; rose-colored chocolate; black chocolate; white chocolate."

Aztec expansion was done to gain or maintain access to foodstuffs needed for ceremonies and everyday life. The leader's ability to acquire food needed for rituals was important for his political success.

== Cannibalism ==
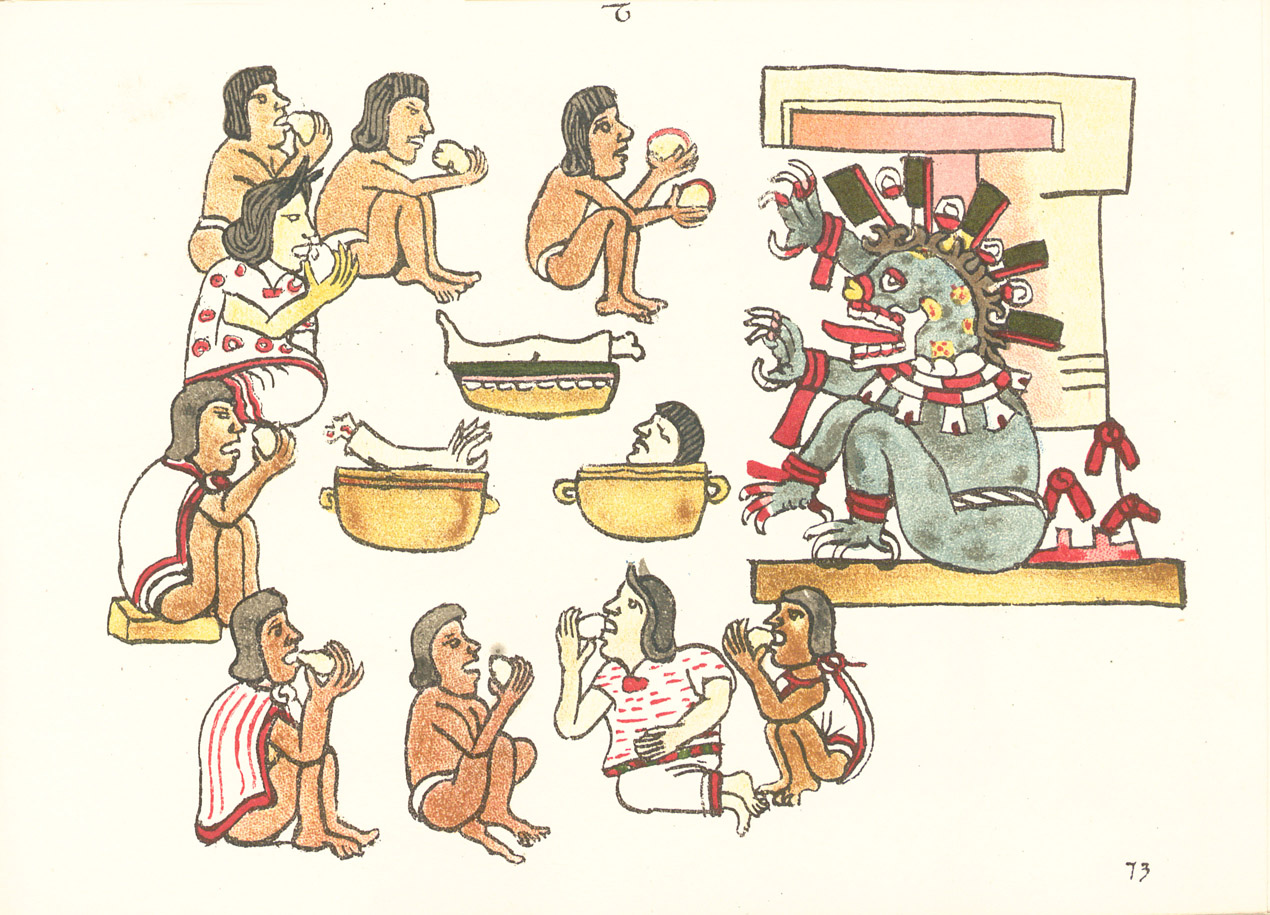
A scene depicting ritual cannibalism being practiced in the Codex Magliabechiano, folio 73r.

The Aztecs practiced ritual cannibalism. Victims, usually prisoners of war, were sacrificed in public on top of temples and pyramids by cutting out their hearts. Victims were also often slaves and children. After excision of the heart, the bodies of the victims were then thrown down to the ground, where they were dismembered. The limbs would be cut off for human consumption, and the torso was fed to animals. Pieces of the body were then distributed to the elite, which were mostly warriors and priests; the meat was consumed in the form of stews, flavored only with salt and eaten with corn tortillas, and without the otherwise ubiquitous chili. While the heads of the victims were collected, the heart would be elevated as an offering to Huītzilōpōchtli, the solar deity and patron god of the Aztecs; they believed that sacrifices of blood made the existence and motion of the sun possible.

The twenty-day annual Tlacaxipehualiztli festival to honor the life-death-rebirth deity Xīpe Totēc was one of intense human sacrifice. It was noted by Sahagún that "it was the time when all captives died, all those taken, all those who were made captive, the men, the women, all the children." It began with the sacrifice of captured warriors, after which the flesh of the sacrificed warriors would be taken to the residence of the Aztec soldier who had captured the warrior. The capturer was forbidden to feast on the flesh of the sacrificed, as he was meant to take sorrow in the victim; however, his family would eat it. A stew called tlacatlaolli (possibly pozole) was prepared out of dried maize, and into each serving would be placed a piece of flesh of the captive.

In the late 1970s, the anthropologist Michael Harner suggested that the Aztecs had resorted to large-scale, organized cannibalism to make up for a supposed protein deficiency in the diet. This idea gained support from some scholars, but others argued it to be highly unlikely because of unfounded assumptions about eating habits, agriculture, and demographics.

== See also ==
- Mexican cuisine
- Maya cuisine
- Moctezuma's Table
- Muisca cuisine
- Inca cuisine
- Domesticated plants of Mesoamerica

== Sources ==
- Bosland, Paul. (1999). "Chiles: A Gift from a Fiery God". HortScience. 34(5): 810.
- Cambridge World History of Food (2000), 2 vol. editors Kiple, Kenneth F. and Coneè Ornelas ISBN 0-521-40216-6
- Carrasco, Davíd. 1995. "Cosmic Jaws: We Eat the Gods and the Gods Eat Us." Journal of the American Academy of Religion 63 (3): 429–63.
- Civitello, Linda (2011). Cuisine and Culture: A History of Food and People. Hoboken, New Jersey: John Wiley & Sons. p. 112. ISBN 978-0-470-41195-7.
- Coe, Sophie D. (1994) America's first cuisines ISBN 0-292-71159-X
- "From Grinding Corn to Dishing Out Money: A Long-Term History of Cooking in Xaltocan, Mexico." In The Menial Art of Cooking: Archaeological Studies of Cooking and Food Preparation, edited by Rodríguez-Alegría Enrique and Graff Sarah R., 99–118. University Press of Colorado, 2012.
- Ortiz de Montellano, Bernard R. (1990) Aztec medicine, health, and nutrition ISBN 0-8135-1562-9
