= Domesticated plants of Mesoamerica =

Domesticated plants of Mesoamerica, established by agricultural developments and practices over several thousand years of pre-Columbian history, include maize and capsicum. The following is a list of Mesoamerican cultivars and staples.

== Staple crops ==
=== Maize ===
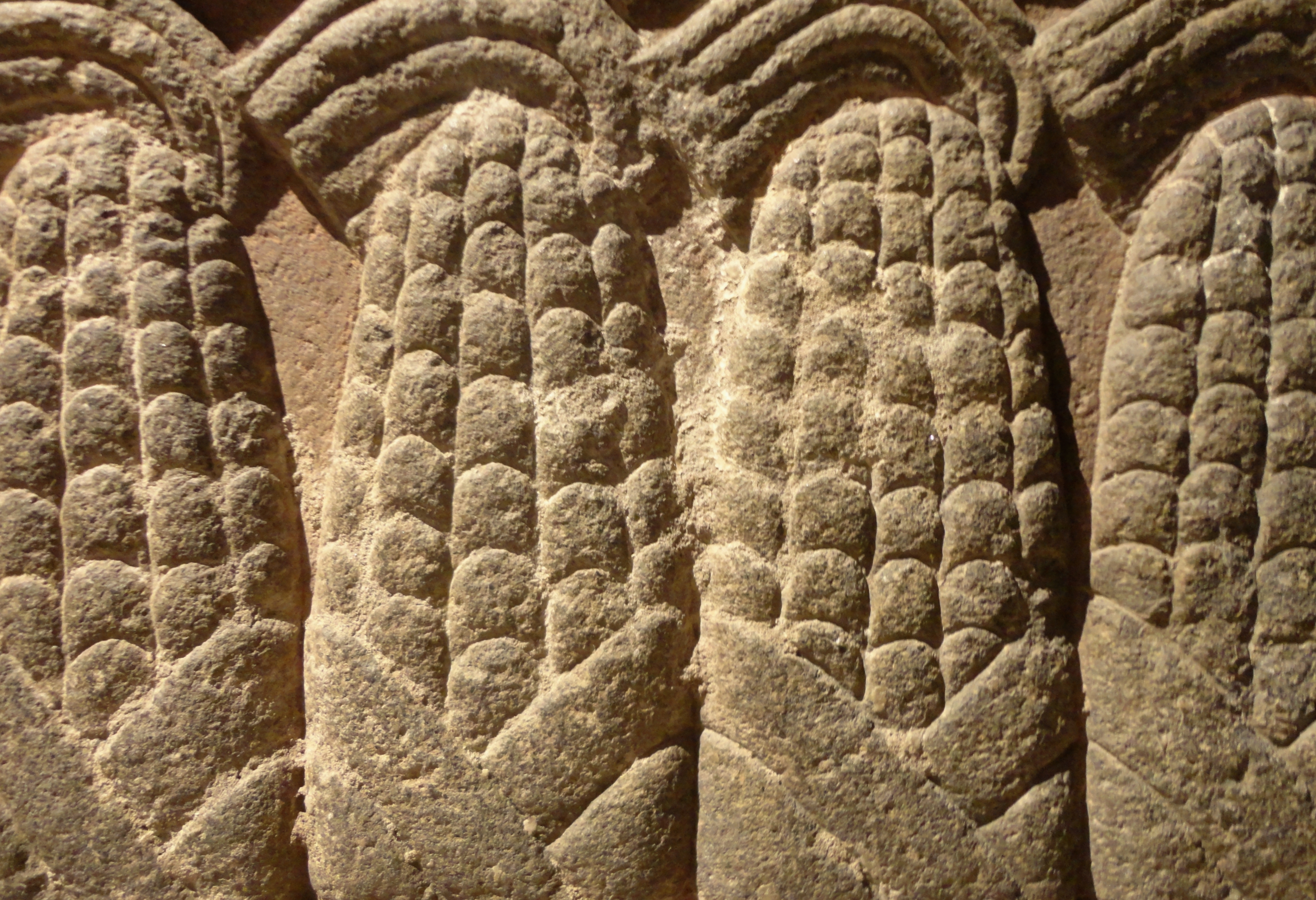
Ancient Mesoamerican relief sculpture of maize, National Museum of Anthropology of Mexico

Maize was domesticated in Western Mexico and Mesoamerican cultures expanded wherever it was cultivated. It became widespread in the Late Archaic Period and was grown wherever conditions allowed.

The early use of maize focused on the consumption of unripened kernels. Before people settled into villages and began farming, the amount of time it took to invest in maize was too great. The output of wild maize did not justify the time and work needed to grow the crop.

However, maize could be both dried and stored which was very important to early Mesoamericans as it could be used on a year-round basis. Drying meant that it could be transported as well. The common bean (Phaseolus vulgaris) was often grown with maize. These two plants provide complementary dietary amino acids. Improved bioavailability of maize was discovered using a special process involving limewater, which also added calcium.

Maize is also associated with festival and feast foods. Before it was domesticated and became a main crop, maize was used as a basis for beer. Beer was transported in decorated vessels and ceramic pottery. These vessels could be taken to social and ritual occasions.

Ritual events or festivals, such as ball games, feasts, and calendar turnings, involved the royal members who took part in the sacrifice of blood-letting and piercing as repayment to the gods for having given maize to the people that year.

Another example of how maize played such a large role in Mesoamerica, is when deities were portrayed with maize. Quetzalcoatl is connected as being a creator of humans in Mesoamerica. This deity is also seen as the one who took maize from the underworld and gave it to humans in the present world.

=== Capsicum ===
Capsicum is the generic name of the chili pepper plant, which is a native domesticated plant from Mesoamerica. Capsaicin reduces the bacterial load when something can not be refrigerated. In Mesoamerica, the capsaicin spice was also used to relieve joint pain, and as an intestinal stimulant, so capsicum is also known as a medicinal plant. The peppers from capsicum plants can be used in a fresh or dried state. A dried chile pepper is stronger and more effective than a fresh chile pepper.

During the Middle Archaic Period or the Coxcatlán phase, between 5700 and 3825 BC, the domestication of plants, such as the chile, was thought to have begun. Mesoamerica's chile crops along with the majority of other food crops, were all domesticated by the Late Formative Period. When the domestication of crops began, the majority of people were working at cultivating fields and crops like the chile. Chiles were a relied on source of food in Mesoamerican times. Chile crops were combined with maize, beans, and squash crops.

Chiles were a part of trade and gift giving. Chiefs or other elite members would use foods and stews spiced with chiles when involved in a feast. Using such strongly spiced foods was to show a stylistic and powerful approach to those receiving the dishes.

The chile plant was featured in different stews including vegetables, turkey, and dog meats and in chile-spiced tomato salsa with tortillas. Chiles were also added at times to cacao, when it was in a beverage form. In Mesoamerica, chiles were used for ritual purposes and therefore, the chile crops did not extend into North and South America like maize, beans, and squash. A cuisine distinct to Mesoamerica was a maize-and-chile pepper based food.

=== Squash ===
The Cucurbita genus were domesticated in at least six independent domestication events, but Mexico is considered the center of Cucurbita diversity. The genus includes the four major species C. pepo (summer squash, zucchini, pumpkins, acorn squash and crookneck squash, C. moschata (butternut squash), C. maxima (pumpkins), and C. argyrosperma (silverseeded gourd) as well as C. digitata (calabazilla), and C. foetidissima (buffalo gourd). Of the four major species, three (C. pepo, C. moschata, and C. argyrosperma) are thought to have been domesticated in Mesoamerica.

The earliest known evidence of the domestication of Cucurbita dates back at least 8,000 years ago, predating the domestication of other crops such as maize and beans in the region by around 4,000 years, and was found in C. pepo samples in the Guilá Naquitz cave in Oaxaca, Mexico. C. pepo was likely the first Cucurbita species domesticated, with domestication resulting in increased seed sizes, thicker and more robust peduncles (stalks supporting flowers or fruit), and thicker rind. By c. 8,000 years BP C. pepo samples are found to have peduncles with diameters over 14mm, unlike wild ancestors, and significantly increased rind thickness. An explosion in the phenotypic diversity of C. pepo further confirms that domestication occurred no later than 8,000 years BP.

Subsequently, C. moschata, and then C. argyrosperma were domesticated. Recent genomic studies suggest that C. argyrosperma, the silver-seeded gourd, was domesticated in Mexico, in the region that is currently known as the state of Jalisco. C. moschata is characterized by two main genetic groups: those from the Yucatán Peninsula, and those from the rest of Mexico.

C. pepo is considered a staple in Mesoamerican diets, dating back to prehistoric times, and is one of the Three Sisters (squash, corn and beans), which were grown together. Silver-seeded gourds are commonly grown for their seeds, which are rich in carbohydrates and fatty acids. Genomic evidence suggests that their domestication occurred at least 8,700 years ago.

=== Pinto bean ===
Frijol pinto ("painted/speckled" bean) nitrogen-fixer traditionally planted in conjunction with the "two sisters", maize and squash, to help condition soil; runners grew on maize)

=== Cassava ===
Edible starchy root also known as manioc; also used to make tapioca.

== Fruits and vegetables ==
=== Tomato ===
Tomato is a member of the nightshade family.

=== Potato ===
Potato is a member of the nightshade family.

=== Avocado ===
Avocado is related to the laurel, cinnamon, and camphor plants.

=== Pineapple ===
Pineapple is cultivated extensively.

=== Prickly pear ===
Opuntia prickly pear cactus.

=== Jicama ===
Jícama (/ˈhɪkəmə/; Spanish pronunciation: [ˈxikama]; from Nahuatl xicamatl, [ʃiˈkamatɬ]), also Yam and Mexican Turnip, is the name of a native Mexican vine, although the name most commonly refers to the plant's edible tuberous root. Jícama is one species in the genus Pachyrhizus. Plants in this genus are commonly referred to as yam bean, although the term "yam bean" can be another name for jícama. The other major species of yam beans are also indigenous within the Americas.

=== Papaya ===
Originally from southern Mexico, particularly Chiapas and Veracruz, Central America and northern South America, the papaya is now cultivated in most tropical countries. In cultivation, it grows rapidly, fruiting within 3 years. It is highly frost sensitive.

=== Guava ===
Guava fruit.

=== Huautli ===
Huautli is an amaranth grain.

=== Cherimoya ===
Cherimoya fruit.

=== Sunflower ===
Sunflower has been cultivated in Mexico and Peru for thousands of years, also source of essential oils.

=== Chaya ===
Chaya is also known as tree spinach.

=== Tepary bean ===
Tepary bean is cultivated from Arizona to Costa Rica. Also gathered from the wild in hot, arid, and semi-arid climates

== Spices and seasonings ==
=== Vanilla ===
Vanilla is a flavoring derived from orchids of the genus Vanilla native to Mexico. Etymologically, vanilla derives from the Spanish word "vainilla", little pod. Originally cultivated by Pre-Columbian Mesoamerican peoples, Spanish conquistador Hernán Cortés is credited with introducing both vanilla and chocolate to Europe in the 1520s. Attempts to cultivate the vanilla plant outside Mexico and Central America proved futile because of the symbiotic relationship between the tlilxochitl vine that produced the vanilla orchid and the local species of Melipona bee; it was not until 1837 that Belgian botanist Charles François Antoine Morren discovered this fact and pioneered a method of artificially pollinating the plant. The method proved financially unworkable and was not deployed commercially. In 1841, a 12-year-old French-owned slave by the name of Edmond Albius, who lived on Île Bourbon, discovered the plant could be hand pollinated, allowing global cultivation of the plant.

There are currently three major cultivars of vanilla grown globally, all derived from a species originally found in Mesoamerica, including parts of modern-day Mexico. The various subspecies are Vanilla planifolia (syn. V. fragrans), grown on Madagascar, Réunion and other tropical areas along the Indian Ocean; V. × tahitensis, grown in the South Pacific; and V. pompona, found in the West Indies, Central and South America. The majority of the world's vanilla is the V. planifolia variety, more commonly known as "Madagascar-Bourbon" vanilla, produced in a small region of Madagascar and in Indonesia.

== Non-food plants ==
=== Chicle ===
Also known as chewing gum.

=== Tobacco ===
note: the tobacco plant was cultivated throughout Central America, the Caribbean and North America.

== See also ==
- Domesticated plants and animals of Austronesia
- List of food plants native to the Americas
- New World crops
