= Nixtamalization =

Procedure for preparing corn to eat

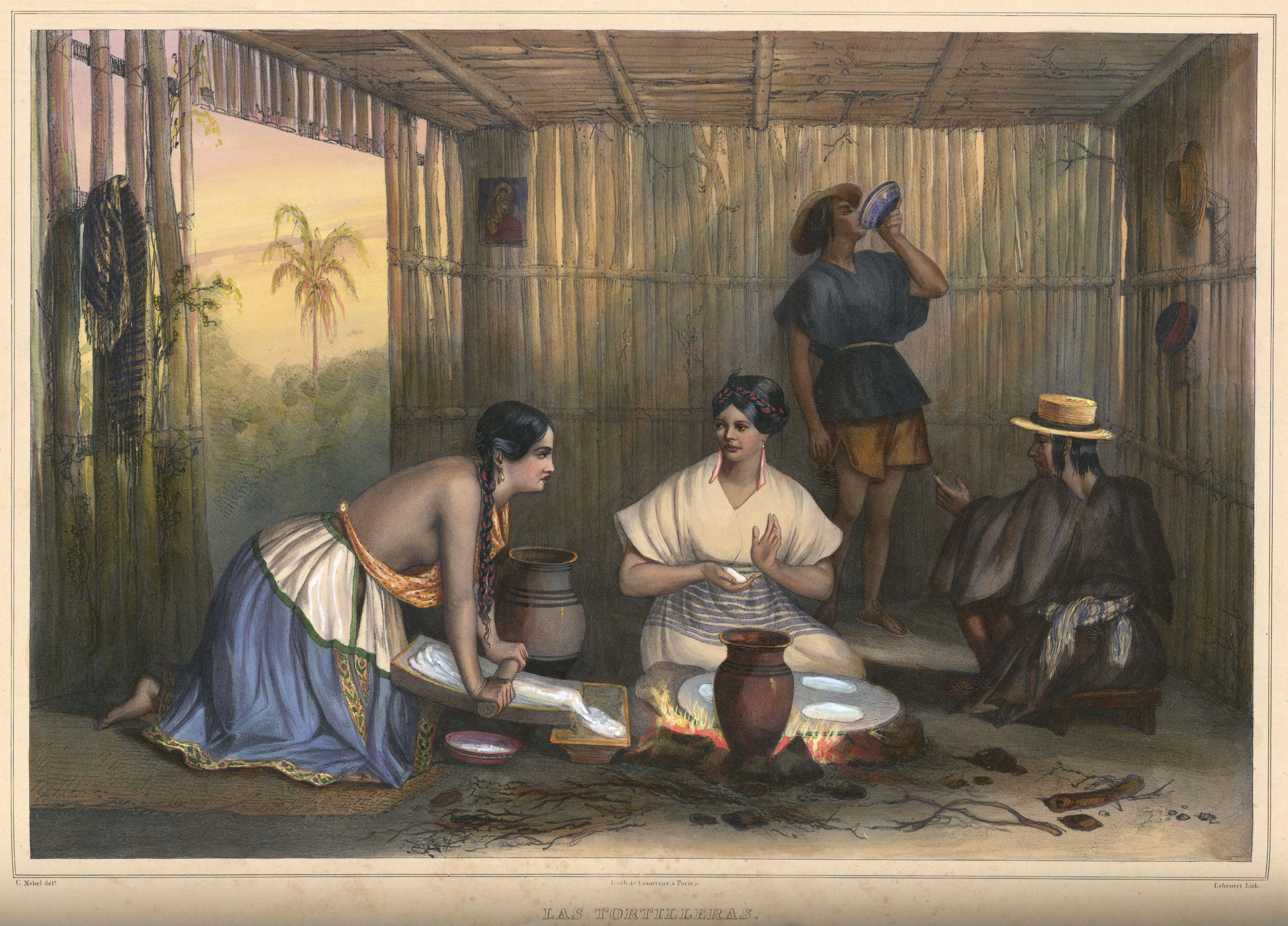
An 1836 lithograph of tortilla production in rural Mexico

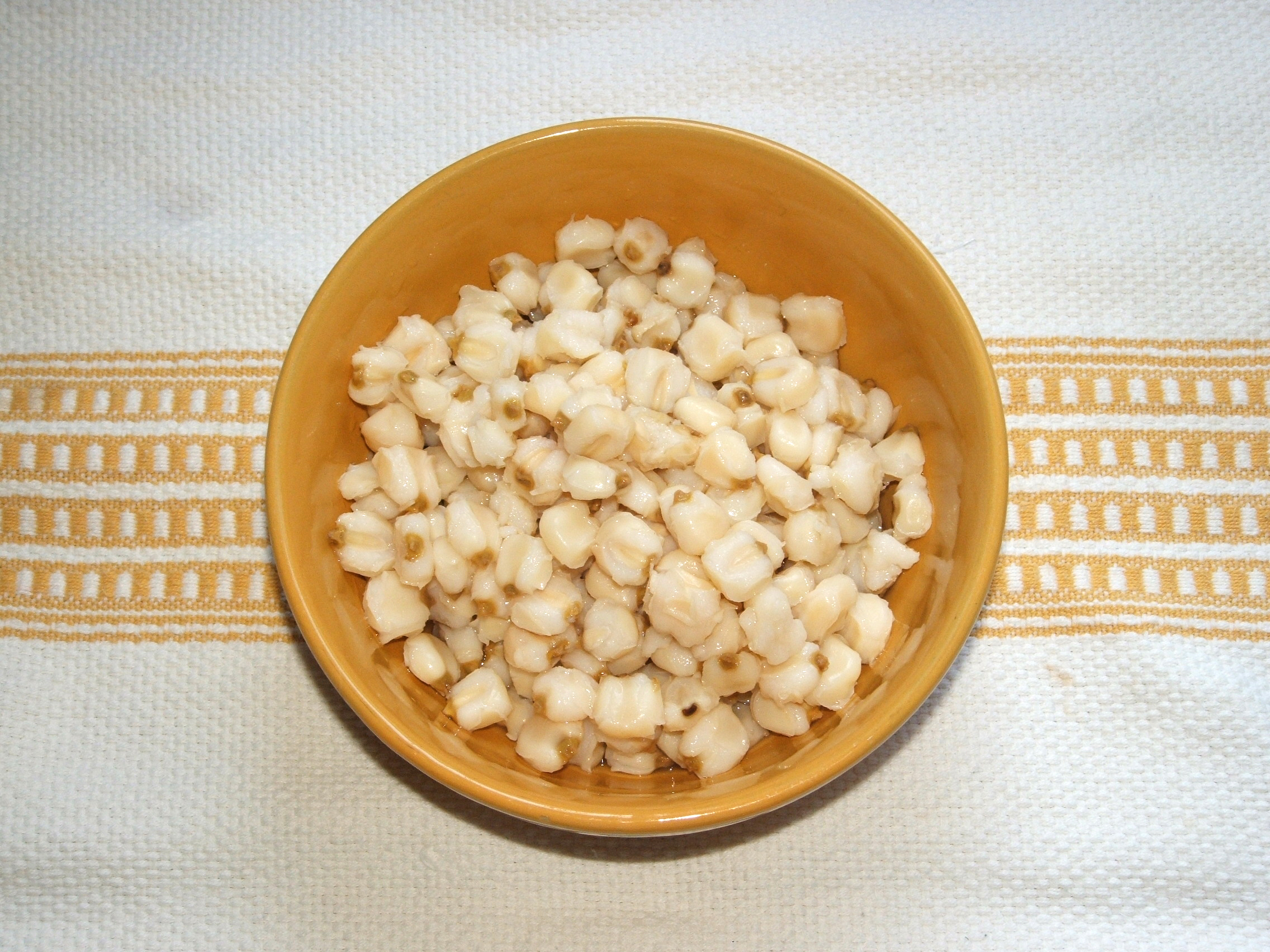
Bowl of hominy (nixtamalized corn kernels)

Nixtamalization (/ˌnɪʃtəməlɪˈzeɪʃən, ˌnɪks-/ nish-tə-mə-lih-ZAY-shən) is a process for the preparation of maize (corn), or other grain, in which the grain is soaked and cooked in an alkaline solution, usually limewater (but sometimes aqueous alkali metal carbonates), washed, and then hulled. The term can also refer to the removal via an alkali process of the pericarp from other grains such as sorghum.

Nixtamalized corn has several benefits over unprocessed grain: It is more easily ground, its nutritional value is increased, flavor and aroma are improved, and mycotoxins are reduced by up to 97–100% (for aflatoxins).

Lime and ash are highly alkaline: the alkalinity helps the dissolution of hemicellulose, the major glue-like component of the maize cell walls, and loosens the hulls from the kernels and softens the maize. The tryptophan in corn proteins is made more available for human absorption, thus helping to prevent niacin deficiency (pellagra). Tryptophan is the metabolic precursor of endogenous niacin (Vitamin B_{3}).

Some of the corn oil is broken down into emulsifying agents (monoglycerides and diglycerides), while bonding of the maize proteins to each other is also facilitated. The divalent calcium in lime acts as a cross-linking agent for protein and polysaccharide acidic side chains.

While cornmeal made from untreated ground maize is unable by itself to form a dough on addition of water, nixtamalized cornmeal will form a dough, called masa. These benefits make nixtamalization a crucial preliminary step for further processing of maize into food products, and the process is employed using both traditional and industrial methods in the production of tortillas and tortilla chips (but not corn chips), tamales, hominy, and many other foodstuffs.

== Etymology ==
In the Aztec language Nahuatl, the word for the product of this procedure is nixtamalli or nextamalli (pronounced [niʃtaˈmalːi] or [neʃtaˈmalːi]), which in turn has yielded Mexican Spanish nixtamal ([nistaˈmal]). The Nahuatl word is a compound of nextli, "ash", referring to the lye involved in its preparation, and tamalli, "unformed/cooked corn dough, tamal". The term nixtamalization can also be used to describe the removal of the pericarp from any grain by an alkali process, including maize, sorghum, and others. When the unaltered Spanish spelling nixtamalización is used in written English, however, it almost exclusively refers to maize.

The labels on packages of commercially sold tortillas prepared with nixtamalized maize usually list corn treated with lime as an ingredient in English, while the Spanish versions list maíz nixtamalizado.

== History ==
=== Mesoamerica ===
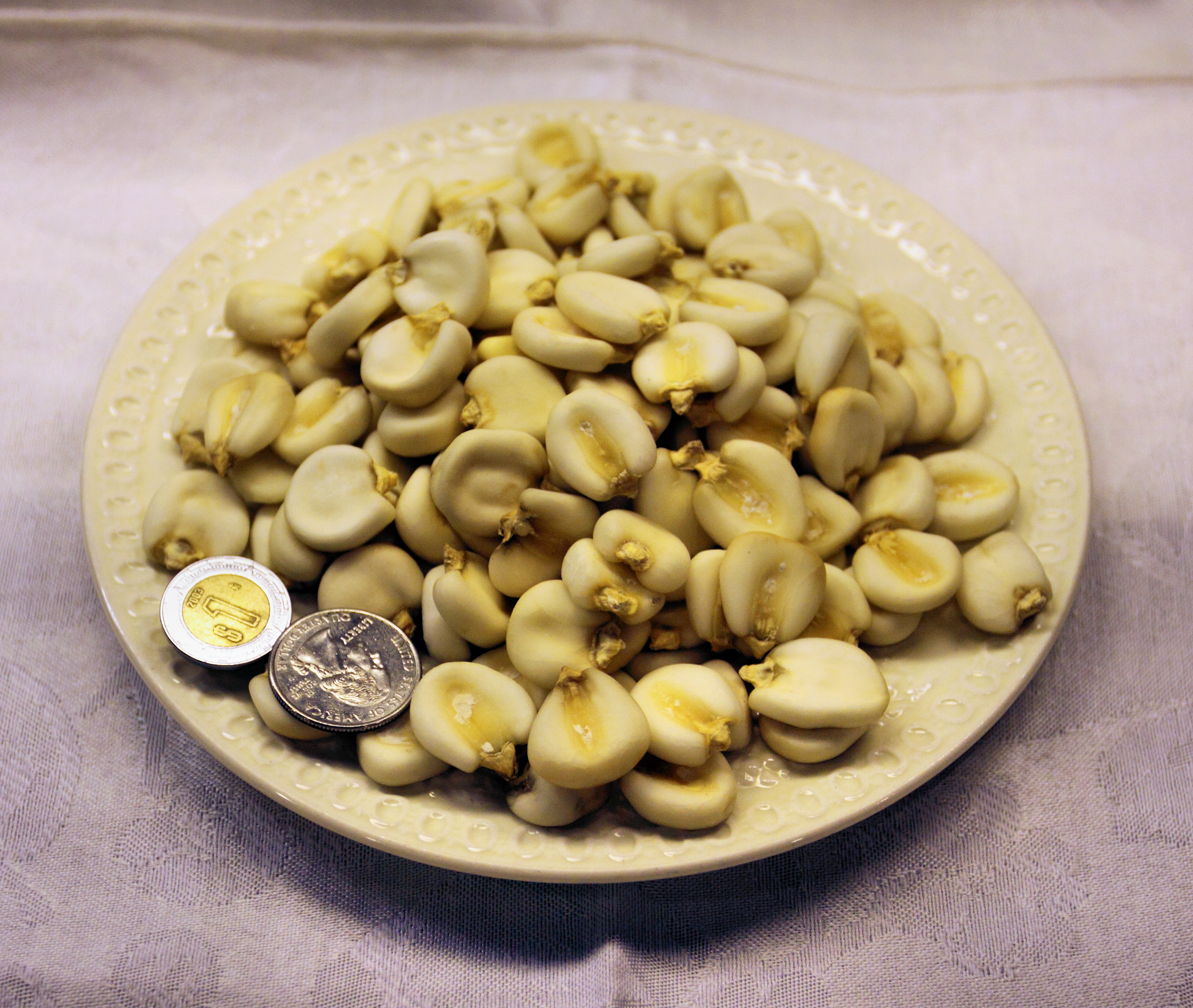
Dried, treated maize sold in Oaxaca, Mexico (US quarter, 24 mm, and Mexican peso, 21 mm, shown for scale)

The process of nixtamalization was first developed in Mesoamerica, where maize was originally cultivated. The earliest evidence is found in Guatemala's southern coast, with equipment dating from 1200 to 1500 BCE. How nixtamalization was discovered is not currently known with certainty, but it may have been through the use of hot cooking stones to boil corn in early cultures which did not have cooking vessels robust enough to put directly on fire or coals. In limestone-bedrock regions like those in Guatemala and southern Mexico, heated chunks of limestone would naturally be used, and experiments show that hot limestone makes the cooking water sufficiently alkaline to cause nixtamalization. Archaeological evidence of this conjecture has been found in southern Utah.

The Aztec and Maya civilizations developed nixtamalization by using slaked lime (calcium hydroxide, or "cal") and lye (potassium hydroxide) to create alkaline solutions. The Chibcha people to the north of the ancient Inca also used calcium hydroxide, while the tribes of North America used soda ash.

The nixtamalization process was very important in the early Mesoamerican diet, as there is very little niacin in corn and the tryptophan within is unavailable without processing. A population that depends on untreated maize as a staple food risks malnourishment and is more likely to develop deficiency diseases such as pellagra, niacin deficiency, or kwashiorkor, the absence of certain amino acids that maize is deficient in. Maize cooked with lime or other alkali provided bioavailable niacin to Mesoamericans. Beans provided the otherwise missing amino acids required to balance maize for complete protein.

=== Spread ===
The spread of maize cultivation in the Americas was accompanied by the adoption of the nixtamalization process. Traditional and contemporary regional cuisines (including Maya cuisine, Aztec cuisine, and Mexican cuisine) included, and still include, foods based on nixtamalized maize.

The process has not substantially declined in usage in the Mesoamerican region, though there has been a decline in North America. Many Native North American tribes, such as the Huron, no longer use the process. In some Mesoamerican and North American regions, dishes are still made from nixtamalized maize prepared by traditional techniques. The Hopi produce sodium carbonate from ashes of various native plants and trees. Some contemporary Maya use calcium salts in the form of ashes of burnt mussel shells or heated limestone.

By 900 CE, nixtamalizing maize based foodways began to spread to the American Southeast, serving as the dietary basis for what would come to be called Mississippian culture populations. The most important nixtamalzing dish was hominy, a dish of boiled maize kernels, either ground or whole, that were nixtamalized using woodash or wood ash lye, both made from the ashes of hardwood trees. The continuation of the hominy foodway after European colonization helped reduce cases of pellagra within twentieth century Native populations.

In the United States, European settlers rarely adopted the nixtamalization process, considering it unnecessary and not to their taste, though maize became a staple among the poor of the southern states. This led to endemic pellagra in poor populations throughout the southern US in the early 20th century. A more varied diet and fortification of wheat flour, the other staple food, have essentially eliminated this deficiency.

Although maize cultivation spread far beyond the Americas via colonialism, the process of nixtamalization did not. For this reason, outbreaks of pellagra occurred in many areas of Europe, where corn often became a staple crop due to its high caloric efficiency relative to the land use required for its cultivation. A prominent example of endemic pellagra occurred in northern Italy in the late 19th century, from which the English term pellagra derives: "pel" meaning skin and "agra" meaning rough or sour in the Bergamo dialect.

== Process ==
=== Cooking ===
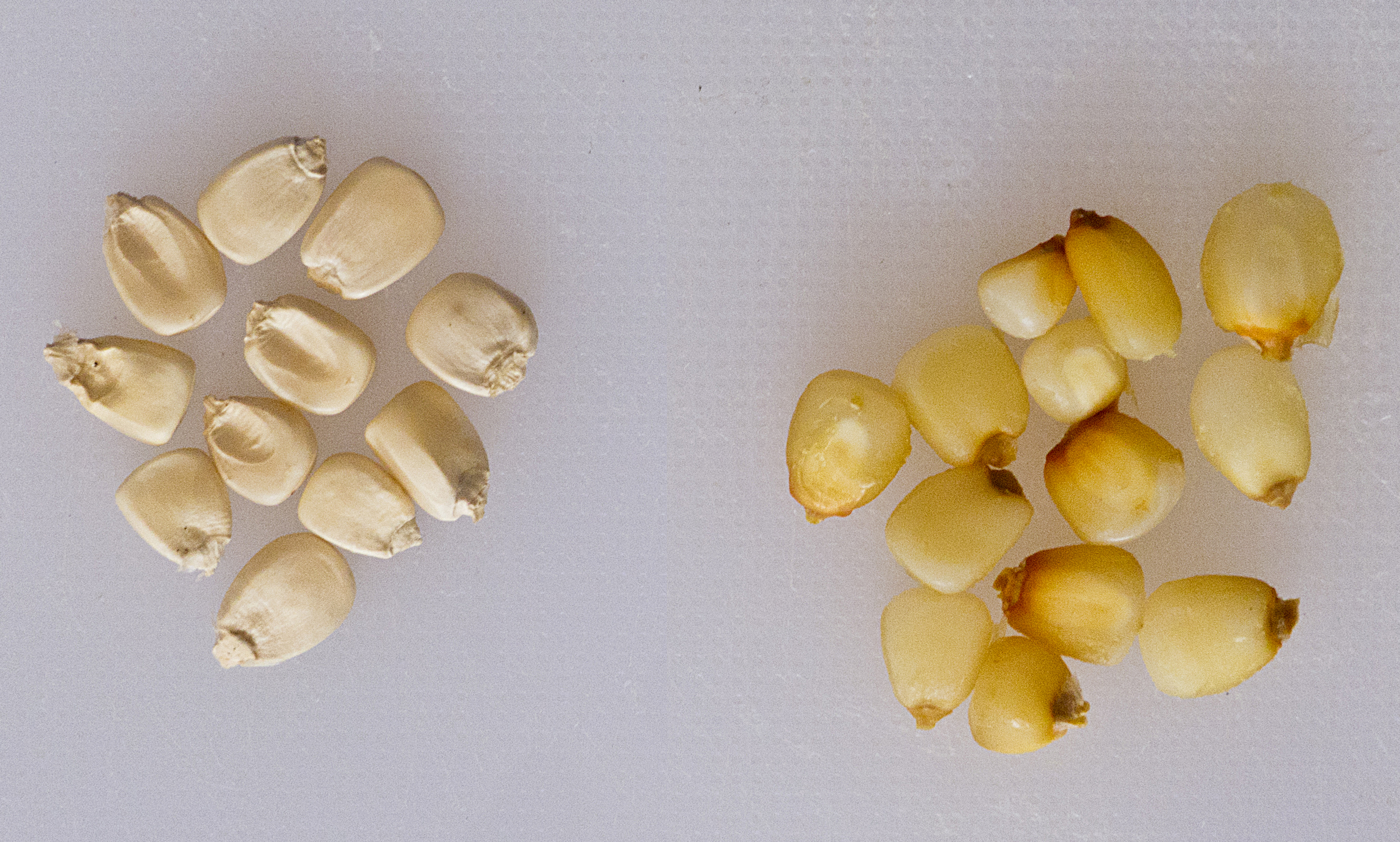
Dry maize, untreated (left) and boiled in lime (right). In this case, typical of El Salvador, 1 pound (450 g) is boiled with 1 tbsp (15 mL) of lime for 15 minutes, left to stand for a few hours, and washed with fresh water. The hulls are removed, and the kernels ground into masa. Exact methods vary by use and region.

In the first step of nixtamalization, kernels of dried maize are cooked in an alkaline solution at or near the mixture's boiling point. After cooking, the maize is steeped in the cooking liquid for a period. The length of time for which the maize is boiled and soaked varies according to local traditions and the type of food being prepared, with cooking times ranging from a few minutes to an hour, and soaking times from a few minutes to about a day.

During cooking and soaking, a number of chemical changes take place in the grains of maize. Because plant cell wall components, including hemicellulose and pectin, are highly soluble in alkaline solutions, the kernels soften and their pericarps (hulls) loosen. The grain hydrates and absorbs calcium or potassium (depending on the alkali used) from the cooking solution. Starches swell and gelatinize, and some starches disperse into the liquid. Certain chemicals from the germ are released that allow the cooked grains to be ground more easily, yet make dough made from the grains less likely to tear and break down. Cooking changes the grain's protein matrix, which makes proteins and nutrients from the endosperm of the kernel more available to the human body.

=== Extraction ===
After cooking, the alkaline liquid (known as nejayote from Nahuatl nexayotl - nextli 'ash' y ayotl 'liquid'), containing dissolved hull, starch, and other corn matter, is decanted and discarded (or sometimes used for making amate bark paper). The kernels are washed thoroughly of remaining nejayote, which has an unpleasant flavor. The pericarp is then removed, leaving the endosperm of the grain with or without the germ, depending on the process. This hulling is performed by hand, in traditional or very small-scale preparation, or mechanically, in larger scale or industrial production.

The prepared grain is called hominy, mote, or nixtamal. Nixtamal has many uses, contemporary and historic. Whole nixtamal may be used fresh or dried for later use. Whole nixtamal is used in the preparation of pozole, menudo, and other foods. Ground fresh nixtamal is made into masa (nixtamal dough) and used to make tortillas, tamales, and pupusas. Dried and ground, it is called masa harina or instant masa flour, and is reconstituted and used like masa.

The term hominy may refer to whole, coarsely ground, or finely ground nixtamal, or to a cooked porridge (also called grits) prepared from any of these. Samp is similar to grits, but a product of a different process.

=== Enzymatic nixtamalization ===
An alternative process for use in industrial settings has been developed known as enzymatic nixtamalization, which uses protease enzymes to accelerate the changes that occur in traditional nixtamalization, a technique borrowed from modern corn wet-milling. In this process, corn or corn meal is first partially hydrated in hot water, so that enzymes can penetrate the grain, then soaked briefly (for approximately 30 minutes) at 50–60 °C (122–140 °F) in an alkaline solution containing protease enzymes. A secondary enzymatic digestion may follow to further dissolve the pericarp. The resulting nixtamal is ground with little or no washing or hulling.

By pre-soaking the maize, minimizing the alkali used to adjust the pH of the alkaline solution, reducing the cooking temperature, accelerating processing, and reusing excess processing liquids, enzymatic nixtamalization can reduce the use of energy and water, lower nejayote (alkaline wastewater) production, decrease maize lost in processing, and shorten the production time (to approximately four hours) compared to traditional nixtamalization with only a minor loss in quality.

== Impact on health ==
The primary nutritional benefits of nixtamalization arise from the alkaline processing involved. The processing renders the protein more digestible, allowing tryptophan to be absorbed by humans. Humans can convert tryptophan into niacin, thus helping to prevent pellagra. Other measures of protein quality are also improved. It was originally thought that the anti-pellagra action stems from increased availability of niacin (compared to a hemicellulose-bound form called "niacytin"), but multiple experiments have disproven this theory.

Secondary benefits can arise from the grain's absorption of minerals from the alkali used or from the vessels used in preparation. These effects can increase calcium (by 750%, with 85% available for absorption), iron, copper, and zinc.

Nixtamalization significantly deactivates mycotoxins which are putative carcinogens. Aflatoxins are reduced by 90–94%. Fumonisins are reduced by 82%.
