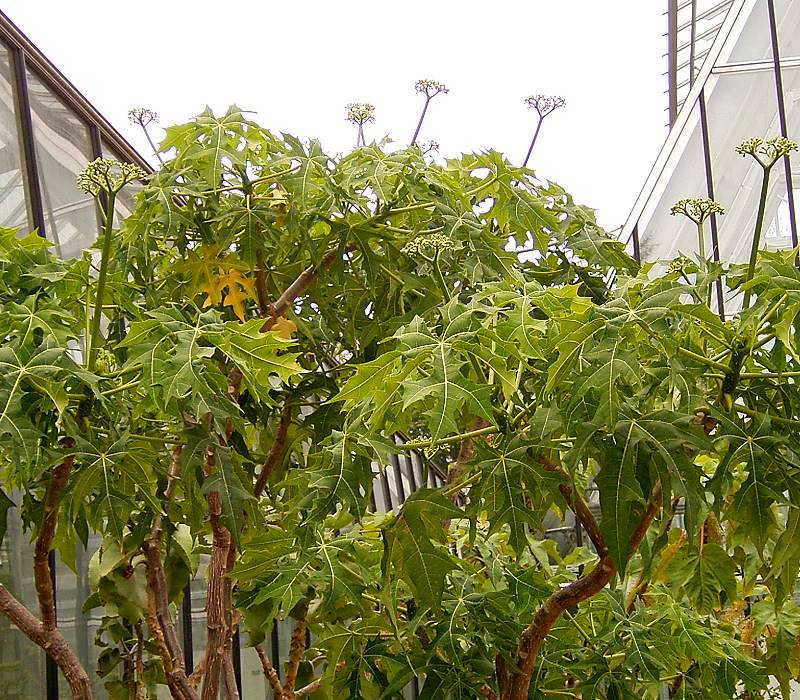
- 'Estrella'

Conservation status
- Least Concern (IUCN 3.1)

Scientific classification
- Kingdom: Plantae
- Clade: Tracheophytes
- Clade: Angiosperms
- Clade: Eudicots
- Clade: Rosids
- Order: Malpighiales
- Family: Euphorbiaceae
- Genus: Cnidoscolus
- Species: C. aconitifolius

Binomial name
- Cnidoscolus aconitifolius (Mill.) I.M.Johnst.

Subspecies
- Cnidoscolus aconitifolius subsp. aconitifolius; Cnidoscolus aconitifolius subsp. polyanthus

Synonyms
- List: Cnidoscolus chayamansa McVaugh; Jatropha aconitifolia Mill.; Cnidoscolus chaya Lundell; Cnidoscolus fragrans (Kunth) Pohl; Cnidoscolus longipedunculatus (Brandegee) Pax & K.Hoffm.; Cnidoscolus napifolius (Desr.) Pohl; Cnidoscolus palmatus (Willd.) Pohl; Cnidoscolus quinquelobatus (Mill.) León; Jatropha deutziiflora Croizat; Jatropha fragrans Kunth; Jatropha longipedunculata Brandegee; Jatropha napifolia Desr.; Jatropha palmata Sessé & Moc. Ex Cerv.; Jatropha papaya Medik.; Jatropha quinqueloba Sessé; Jatropha quinquelobata Mill.

= Cnidoscolus aconitifolius =

Species of tree

Cnidoscolus aconitifolius, commonly known as chaya, tree spinach, Mayan tree spinach, or spinach tree, is a large, fast-growing and leafy perennial shrub in the spurge family Euphorbiaceae.

The plant is native to Mexico. As with most euphorbias, the plant exudes an irritating, often toxic latex when damaged. The plant is cultivated in warm climates for its leaves that are cooked and eaten like spinach.

== Description ==
The plant can grow up to 5 metres (16 ft) tall. The leaves are palmately lobed with three or more lobes that are also lobed themselves, and measure 10–30 cm (4–12 in) across depending on the age and variety.

Small white flowers are arranged in a terminal panicle held well above the surrounding foliage. The ellipsoid seed pods have longitudinal stripes and measure about 1.5 cm (1/2 in) across; they are green when immature, turning pale yellow to tan and explosively dehiscing on maturity. Mature seed pods are rarely seen on cultivated specimens so they are often vegetatively propagated; flowers on such specimens are either sterile or seldom produced.

=== Similar species ===
As suggested by its Latin name, the species may resemble members of Aconitum.

== Taxonomy ==
Cnidoscolus aconitifolius subsp. aconitifolius is endemic to northern Mexico south to Belize and Guatemala, and is cultivated in other countries, as far south as Peru, while C. aconitifolius subsp. polyanthus (Pax and K.Hoffm.) Breckon is restricted to a small area in western Mexico.

Plants in the Chayamansa group (syn. C. chayamansa) are the most widely cultivated, lacking stinging hairs on their leaves. There are four predominant cultivars based on leaf morphology, notably Chayamansa (the most common), Estrella, Picuda, and Redonda.

=== Etymology ===
The specific epithet, aconitifolius, refers to the resemblance of the leaves to those of Aconitum species—another well-known dangerous, even deadly, genus of plants.

== Distribution ==
Chaya is believed to have originated in the Yucatán Peninsula of southeastern Mexico, through Central America to Panama.

== Cultivation ==
The species is cultivated in warm regions around the world for its edible leaves, including northern South America, tropical Africa, Southeast Asia, and the Pacific.

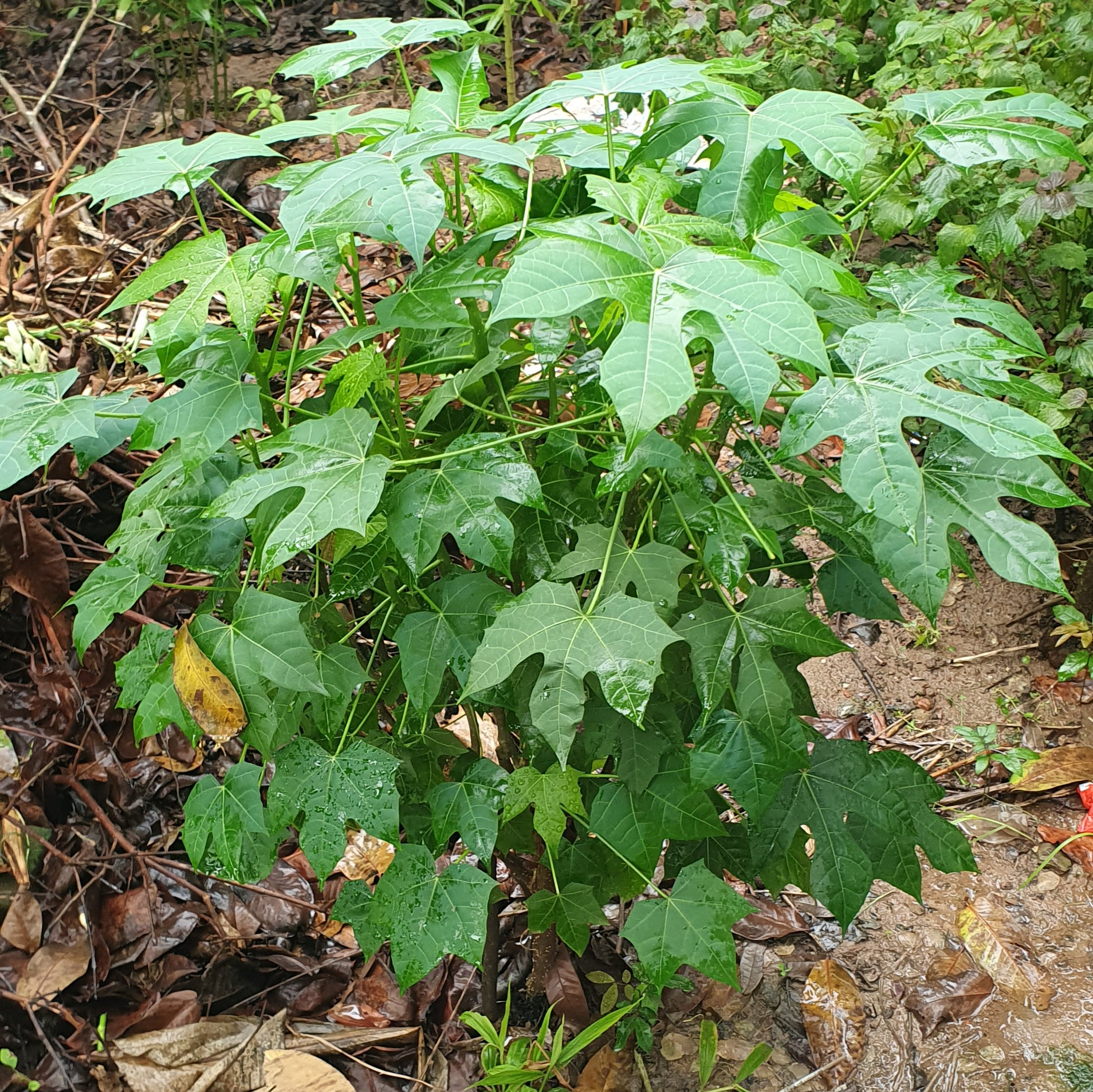
Young specimen cultivated in Vietnam.

Chaya can be grown as a potherb, preferring full sun and a warm climate. It is easy to grow and it suffers little insect damage. It may be a tender perennial in the United States, but persists in climates such as Florida. It is tolerant of heavy rain and has some drought. Propagation is normally by woody stem cuttings about 15–30 cm (6–12 in) long, as seeds are rarely produced. Early growth is slow as roots are slow to develop on the cuttings, so leaves are not harvested until the second year. Thereafter, chaya leaves may be harvested continuously provided that more than 50% of the leaves are removed from the plant, in order to guarantee healthy new plant growth.

A USDA study in Puerto Rico reported that higher yields of greens could be obtained with chaya than any other vegetable they had studied. In another study, chaya leaves were found to contain substantially greater amounts of nutrients than spinach leaves.

=== Cultivars ===
There are four well-known cultivars, Chayamansa, Estrella, Picuda, and Redonda. Cultivars Chayamansa, Estrella, and Redonda cannot produce seeds or fruit due to unviable pollen, while Picuda and other cultivars can. These cultivars have fewer urticating hairs compared to other cultivars and the wild type of the species, and are thus more common in culinary use.

== Toxicity ==
The raw leaves contain large quantities of toxic cyanogenic glycosides, in addition to the irritating sap typical of the Euphorbiaceae family. Some varieties also have stinging hairs and require gloves for harvesting. Thorough cooking destroys both the stinging hairs and toxins found in the raw plant.

Care should be taken to avoid contact between raw plant material and one's mucous membranes including the mouth, eyes, genitals, nose, inner ears, or any otherwise open wound or injury. Complications can occur, from mild irritation to severe burning pain and in more serious cases, temporary blindness if it enters the eyes, or a temporary loss of smell or taste if it touches the nose or mouth.

While raw consumption is discouraged, some sources state that no more than five raw leaves can be eaten per day. However, to avoid the risk of poisoning, leaves must be cooked for 5–15 minutes before eating, with 20 minutes being recommended most often in recipes. Additionally, aluminum utensils should not be used to cook chaya, as there is a risk of the plant's toxins reacting with aluminum, making the dish unsafe to eat.

== Uses ==
It is a popular leaf vegetable in some regional Mexican and other Central American cuisines, used similarly to cooked Swiss chard or spinach. Young leaves and the tender stem tips can be eaten boiled, steamed or stir-fried, and has a mild, sometimes umami taste with a distinct crunchy texture that is retained after cooking.

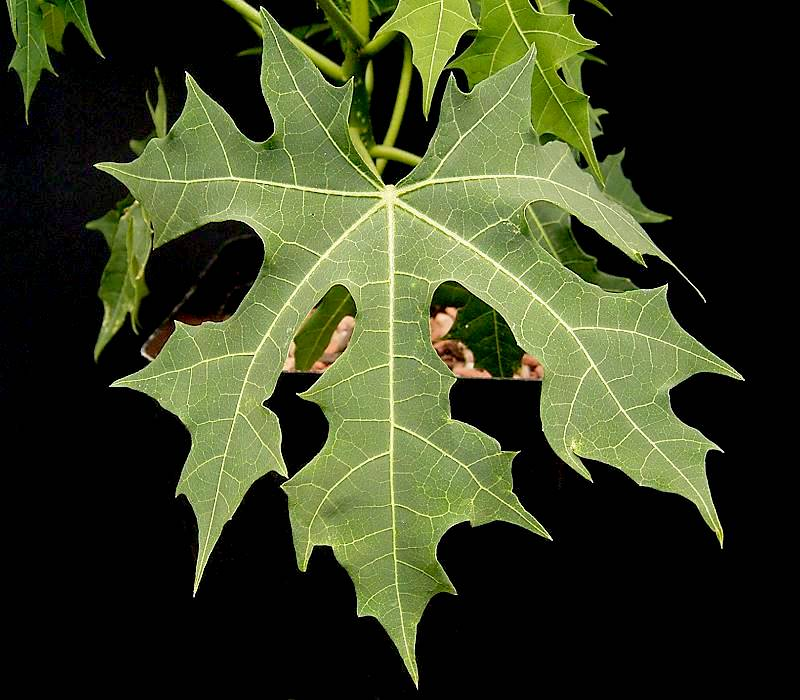
Chaya leaf

Chaya is one of the most productive green vegetables. It is rich in protein, vitamins, calcium, iron, and antioxidants, containing two to three times more nutrients than other, more common leafy vegetables. Cooking is essential prior to consumption because raw chaya leaves contain toxic cyanogenic glycosides, similar to the related crop cassava. Aluminum utensils should not be used to cook chaya to avoid possible dangerous side-effects.

Traditionally, leaves are simmered for 20 minutes and then served with oil or butter. The stock or liquid in which the leaves are cooked is safe for consumption, as heat causes the cyanogenic glycosides to decompose, releasing hydrogen cyanide into the air.

In Mayan traditional medicine, an infusion of the leaves is used to treat kidney stones, high blood pressure, and diabetes. Experiments with rabbits suggest that chaya leaves have a possible antidiabetic effect.

== Other sources ==
- Ross-Ibarra, J.; A. Molina-Cruz (December 2002). "The Ethnobotany of Chaya (Cnidoscolus Aconitifolius SSP. Aconitifolius Breckon): A Nutritious Maya Vegetable". Economic Botany. 56 (4): 350–36. doi:10.1663/0013-0001(2002)056[0350:TEOCCA]2.0.CO;2. S2CID 20681734.
