= Mijares Mexican Restaurant =

Mexican food restaurant

Coordinates: 34.1376°N 118.1536°W

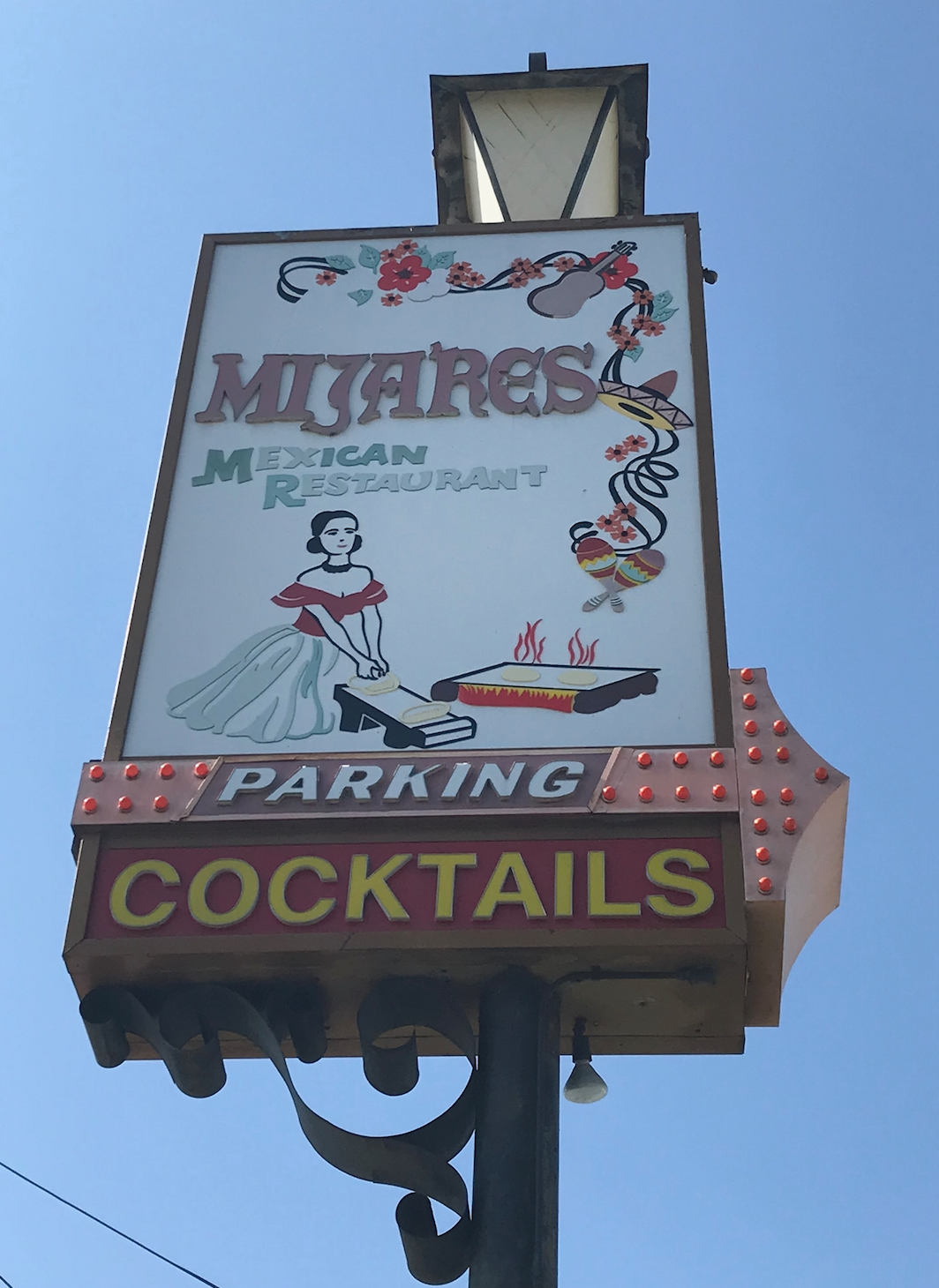
- The Mijares roadside sign.
- Industry: Mexican food restaurant
- Founded: 1920
- Founder: Jesucita Mijares
- Headquarters: 145 Palmetto Dr., California, U.S.
- Owner: Mijares Family descendants
- Website: www.mijaresrestaurant.com

Mijares Mexican Restaurant is Pasadena, California's oldest Mexican food restaurant. Located at 145 Palmetto Dr., it was founded in 1920.

== History ==
Jesucita Mijares moved to the United States in the early 1900s, taking in and feeding boarders at her home, which started her "Mexicatessen," Mijares Restaurant; she founded the small tortilla and tamale factory in a complex of four houses on Palmetto Drive in 1920. The largest house served as a restaurant, though it burned in a fire in 1979. However, one of the other houses became the new restaurant's current banquet room. Jesucita died in 1988, but the restaurant stayed in the family; as of 2022, six Mijares family members run the restaurant, including Jesucita's daughter, Alice Mijares Recendez, born in 1932. It seats 600 people and retains 40 employees.

== Awards and honors ==
In 2020, the Pasadena Mexican American History Association honored Mijares with a centennial plaque.

== Gallery ==
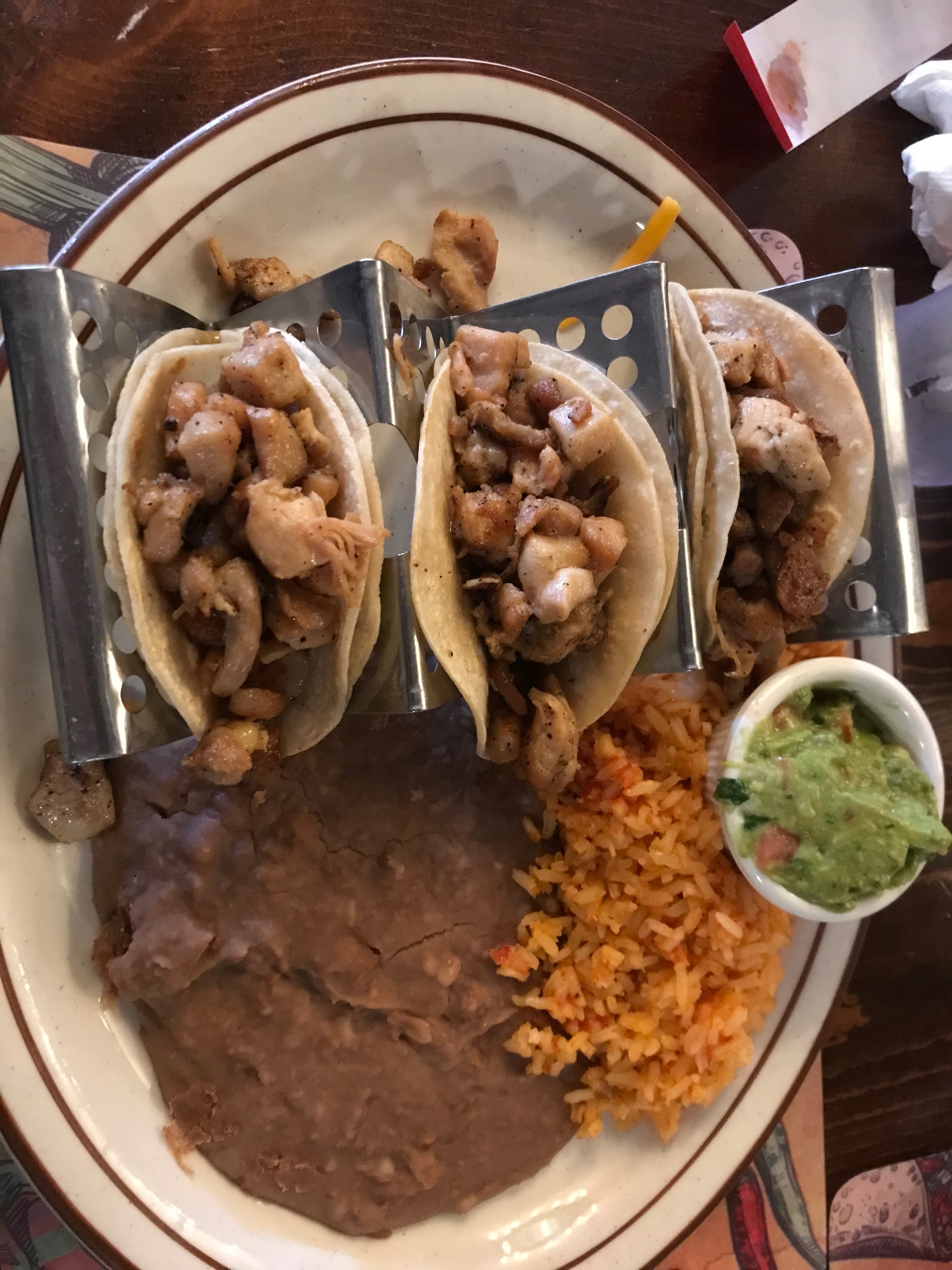
Chicken taco plate at Mijares.

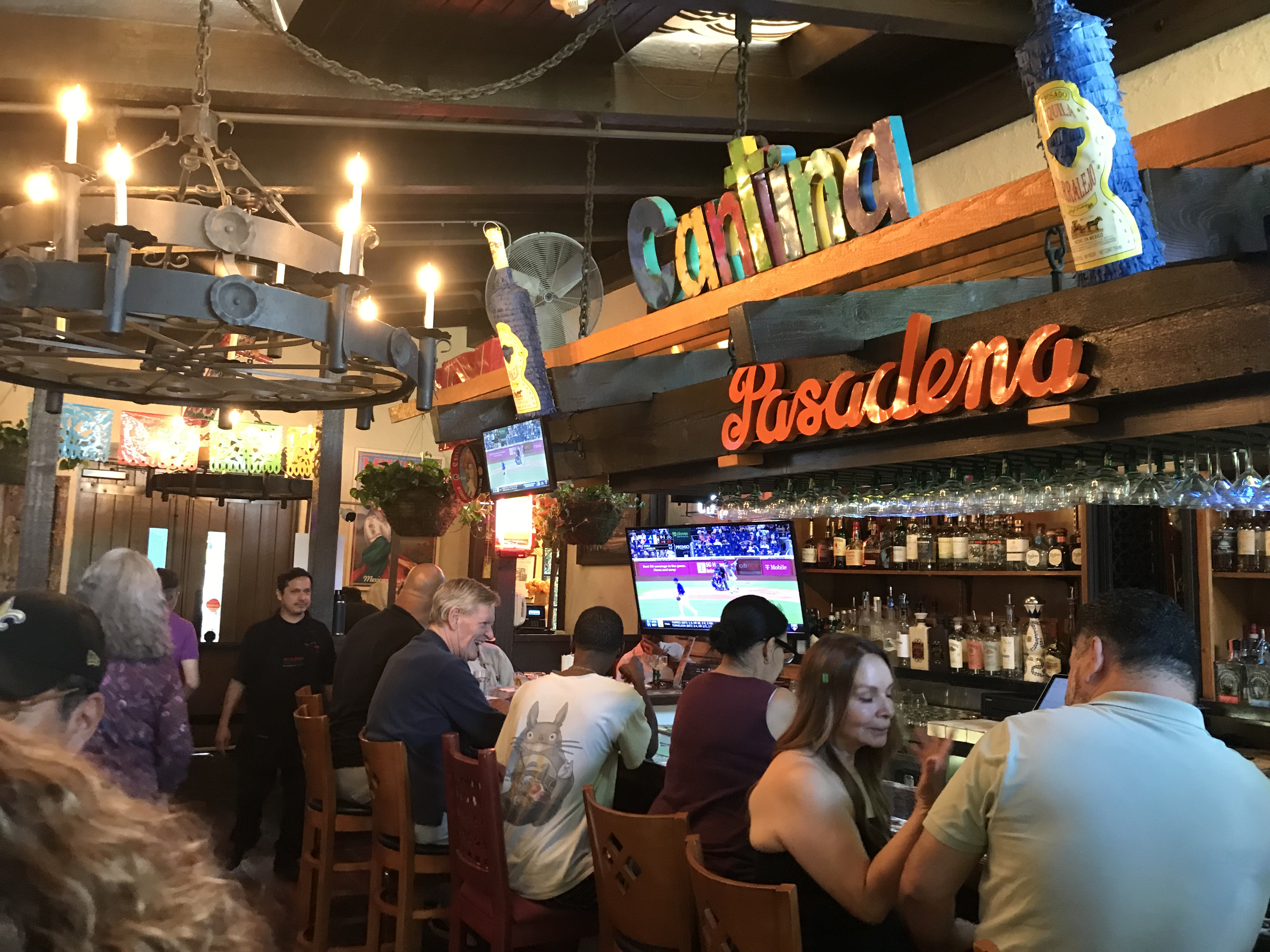
The bar at Mijares.

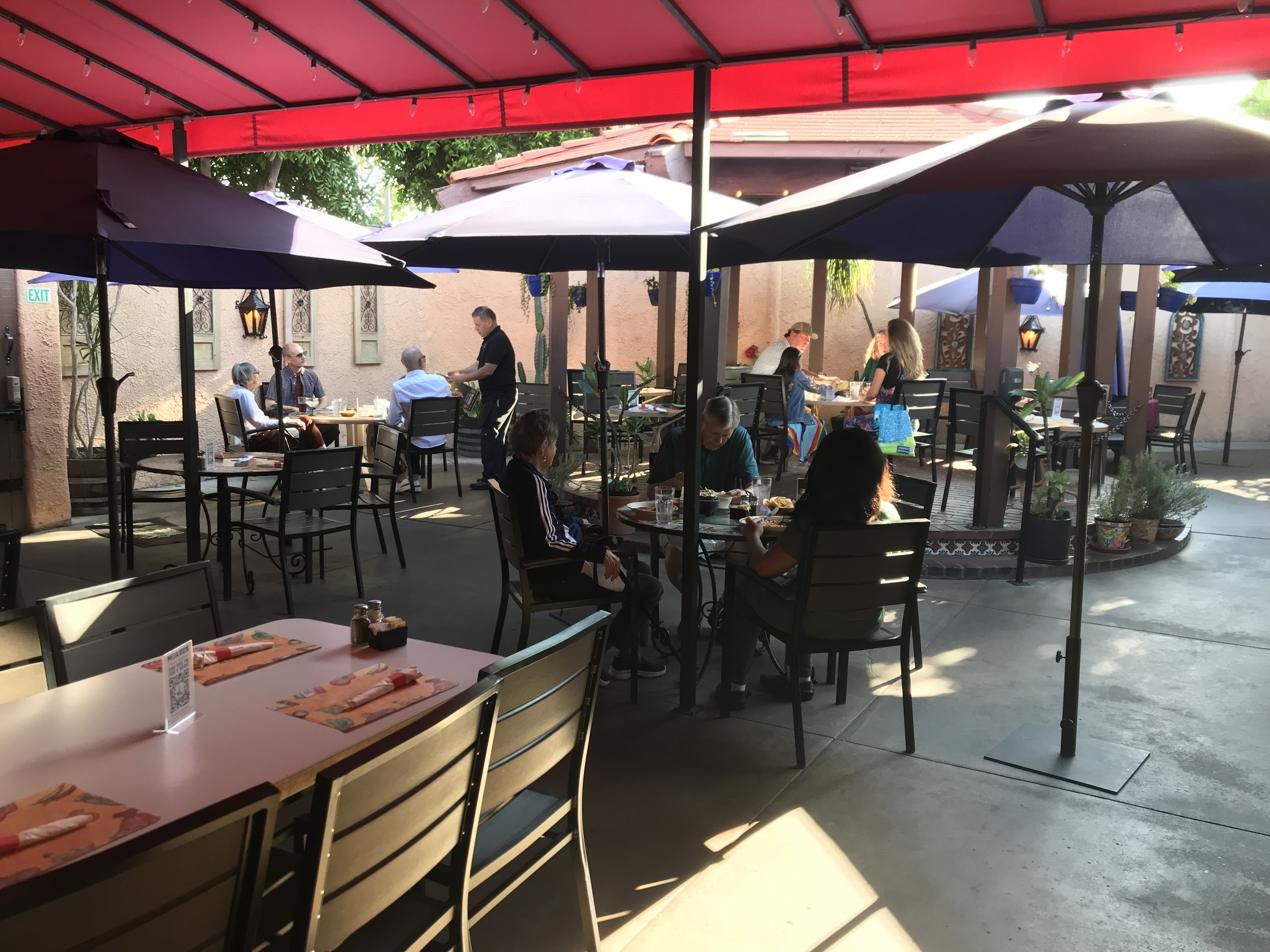
Patio at Mijares.

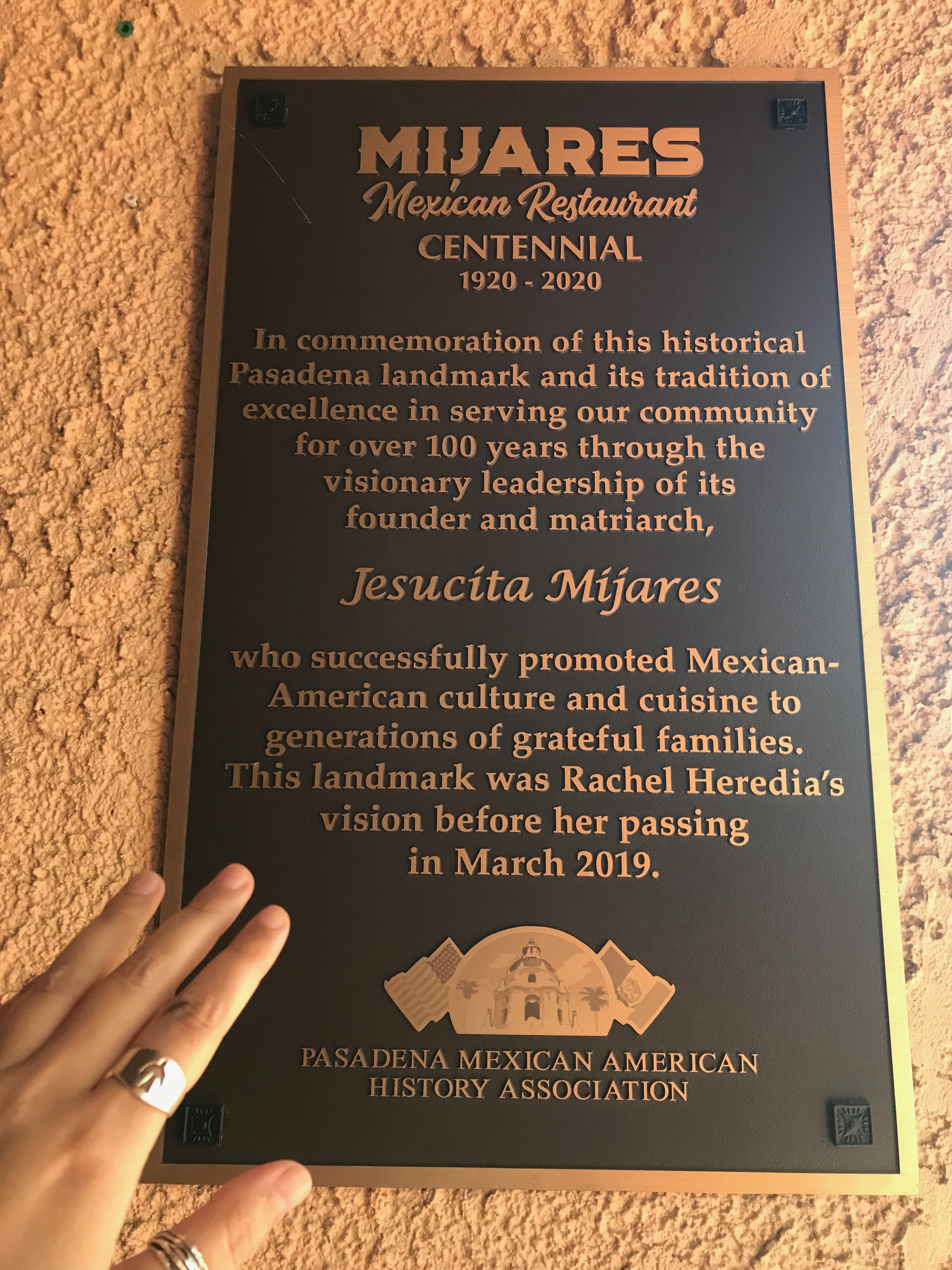
Centennial plaque at Mijares.
