= Hard-shell taco =

Type of Mexican-American taco

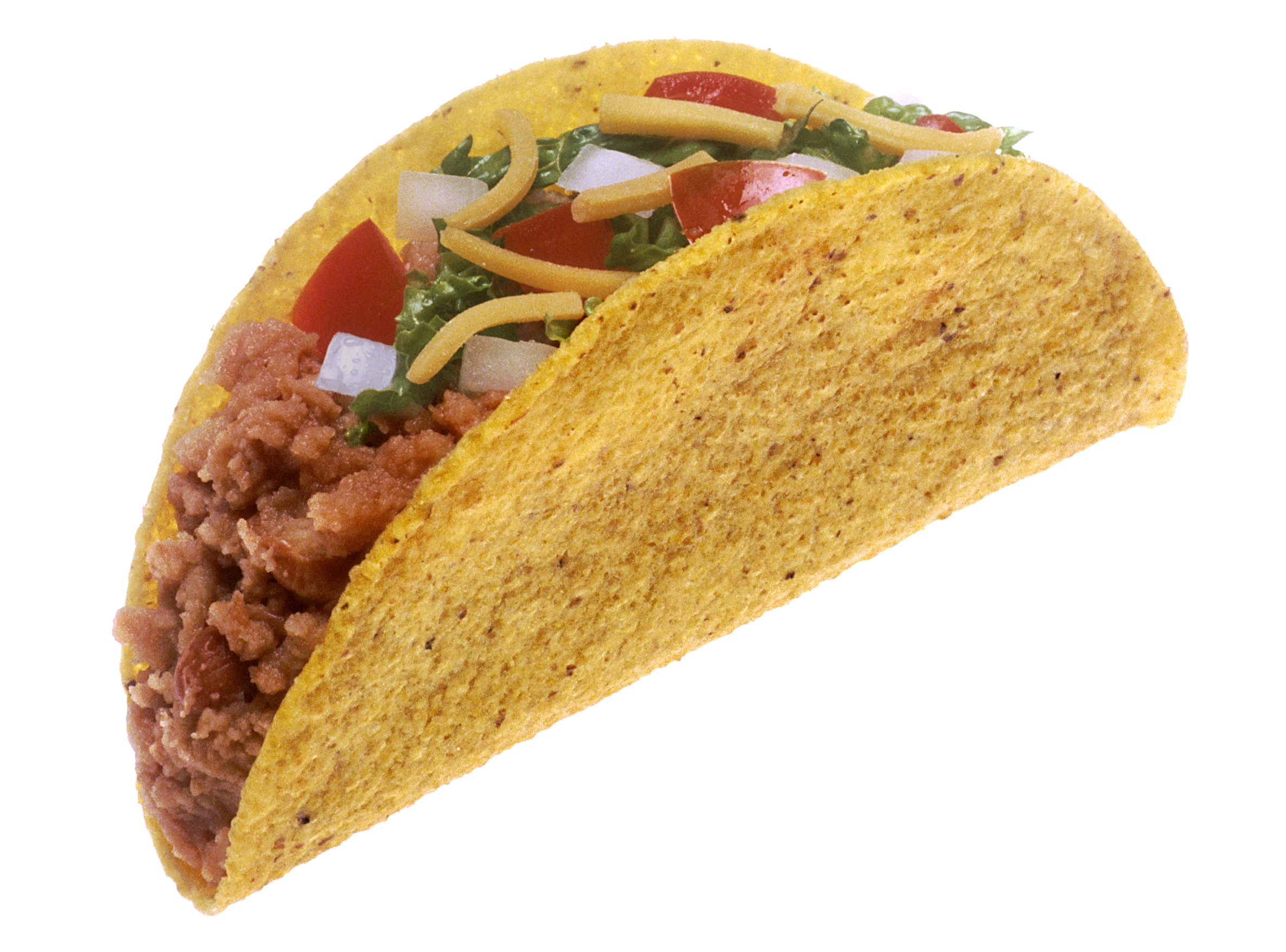
- Alternative names: Crispy taco
- Type: Finger food
- Place of origin: United States
- Main ingredients: Tortillas, meat, vegetables, cheese
- Similar dishes: Soft taco

The hard-shell or crunchy taco is a Mexican-American dish that developed from the taco in the United States. The earliest references to hard-shell tacos are from the early 1890s, and by the early 20th century this style of taco was available in Mexican-American communities across the US. Fast food chains began to market hard-shell tacos to Americans in the mid-1950s, with Taco Bell playing a significant role in popularizing the food during the 1960s.

== Description ==
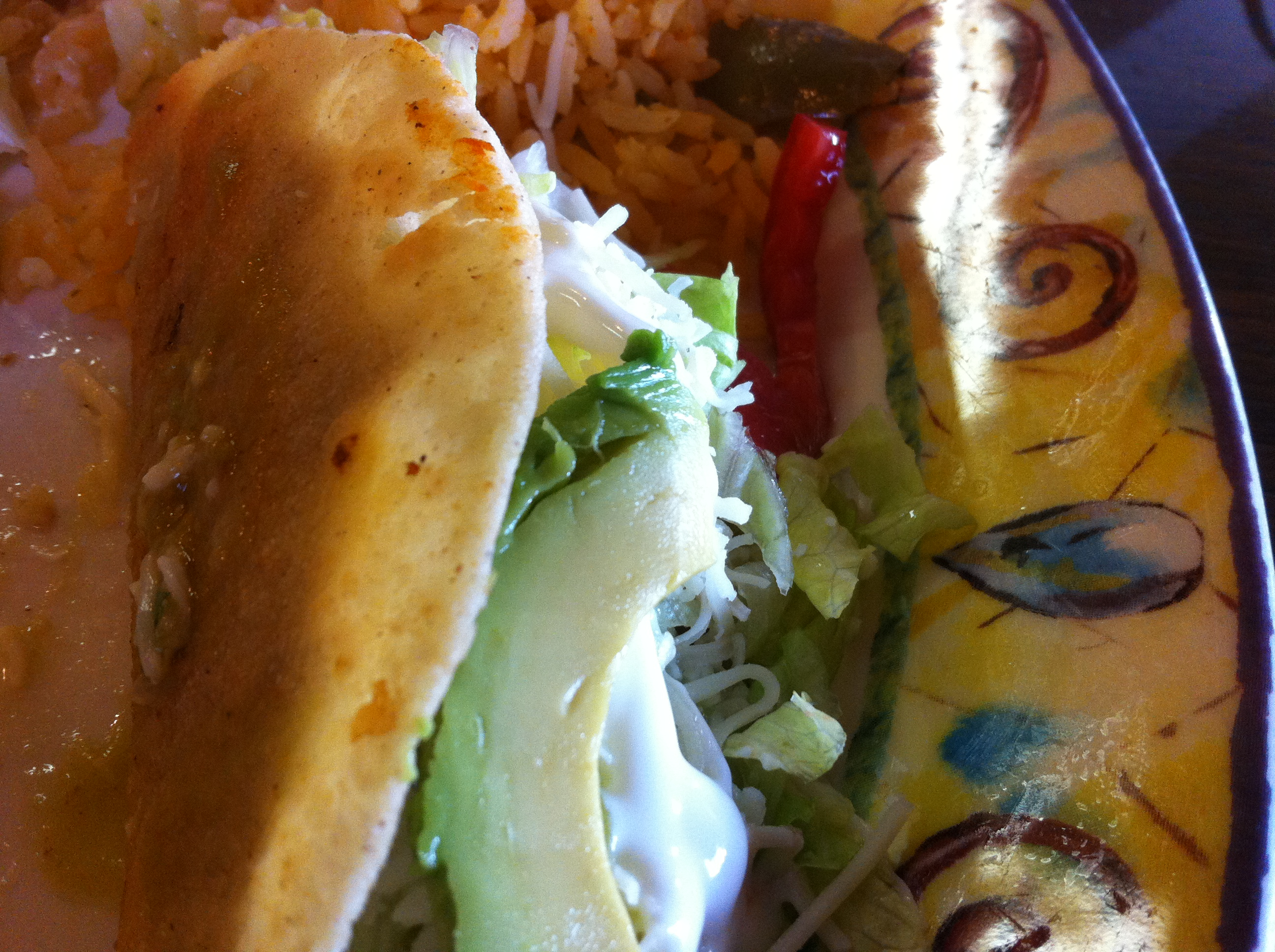
A hard-shell taco from a taqueria in Sacramento, CA

While many different versions of hard-shell tacos exist, the most common form of the hard-shell taco is served as a U-shaped crisp-fried corn tortilla filled with seasoned ground beef, cheese, lettuce, and sometimes tomato, onion, salsa, sour cream, and avocado or guacamole. Such tacos are sold by restaurants and by fast food chains, while kits are readily available in most supermarkets. Hard shell tacos are sometimes known as tacos dorados ("golden tacos") in Spanish, a name that they share with taquitos, a similar dish.

== History ==
Various sources credit different individuals with the invention of the hard-shell taco, but some form of the dish likely predates all of them. Beginning from the early part of the twentieth century, various types of tacos became popular in the United States, especially in Texas and California, but also elsewhere. An early description of a fried and presumably crispy taco was in the 1914 cookbook, California Mexican-Spanish Cookbook by Bertha Haffner Ginger. By the late 1930s, companies such as Ashley Mexican Food and Absolute Mexican Foods were selling appliances and ingredients for cooking hard shell tacos, and the first patents for hard-shell taco cooking appliances were filed in the 1940s. In 1937, Salvador and Lucia Rodriguez—immigrants from Jalisco, Mexico—opened the Mitla Cafe in San Bernardino, California. Lucia Rodriguez is credited with creating the signature American-style hard shell taco by pre-frying corn tortillas in a U-shape and filling them with seasoned ground beef, cheese, lettuce, and tomatoes.

In 1949, a recipe for a hard-shell taco first appeared in a cookbook, The Good Life: New Mexican food, which was written by Fabiola Cabeza de Baca Gilbert. Her recipe relied on a two-stage frying method to get the signature U-shape. First, she specified using white corn tortillas and dipping them into hot lard or oil for just a few seconds. The goal was simply to make them limp and pliable, not crisp. After blotting the excess fat, she filled the pliable tortilla with meat, onion and celery, then folded it into a U-shape, and pinned it shut with a toothpick to hold its shape. The entire taco was submerged back into hot fat and fried until the shell turned golden brown and rigidly crisp.

Juvencio Maldonado, a restaurant owner from Oaxaca living in New York, is sometimes credited as the original inventor of a hard shell taco-making machine, and received a patent for it in 1950.

In the mid-1950s, Glen Bell opened Taco Tia, and began selling a simplified version of the tacos being sold by Mexican restaurants in San Bernardino, particularly the tacos dorados being sold at the Mitla Cafe across the street from another of Bell's restaurants. Later, Bell owned and operated four El Taco restaurants in southern California before opening the first Taco Bell in 1962. At this time, Los Angeles was racially segregated, and the hard-shell tacos sold at Bell's restaurants were many white Americans' first introduction to Mexican food.

== See also ==
- American cuisine
- Mexican Americans
- Tex-Mex
- Tostada
