= Tortilla Price Stabilization Pact =

2007 Mexican Federal Government agreement

The Tortilla Price Stabilization Pact was an agreement between the Mexican Federal Government, headed by President Felipe Calderón, and several tortilla producing companies in Mexico to limit the volatility of price in tortillas in early 2007.

== Background ==
Production of corn in the United States has long been subsidised. As a result, US producers regularly produced abundant surpluses which they exported abroad, including Mexico, keeping corn prices, and thus tortilla prices, there stable. However, this had the effect of significantly depressing Mexican corn production, as domestic producers could not compete with cheap imported corn. Starting in the early 2000s, US farmers increasingly began to use corn to produce biofuel rather than for human consumption, causing a rapid increase in the price of corn.

The international price of corn (maize) had been rising dramatically throughout 2006, leading to the inflation of tortilla prices in the first month of Calderón's term. Because tortillas are the main food product consumed by Mexico's poorest people, national concern over the rising prices immediately generated political pressures for Calderón's administration.

== The Pact ==
President Calderón opted for using price ceilings for tortillas that protect local producers of corn. This price control came in the form of a "Tortilla Price Stabilization Pact" between the government and many of the main tortilla producing companies, including Grupo Maseca and Bimbo, to put a price ceiling at MXN 8.50 per kilogram of tortilla. The idea of the agreement is that having these producers ceiling their prices would incentive the market to lower the prices nationally.

== Criticism ==
The Pact has been heavily criticized by both the right and the left. Critics argue that the Pact was both non-binding and a de facto acceptance of a 30% increase in the price of that product (from MXN 5.95 to 8.50 per kilogram). Many tortillerías ignored the agreement, leading to price increases in well in excess of the 8.50 pesos. Government opposition see this as an indication of the failure to protect the economy of poor consumers. In response to this, PROFECO, the government consumer protection agency, has also threatened with jail those tortilla producers who charge "excessive" prices.

However, some major supermarkets such as Soriana, or Comercial Mexicana sell their tortillas at a lower price than the one in the agreement, and even 14% lower than the original price, reaching even MXN 5.10 per kilogram. That is interpreted by liberals as evidence that price controls, and the Tortilla Price Stabilization Pact, were unnecessary and potentially harmful for the market.

== Results ==
Three months after the pact was signed, the Secretariat of Economy has informed that the price of tortillas was reduced in most of the country's 53 largest cities. However, in 27 cities and 15 states the price is above the agreed 8.50 pesos. In fact, in Tijuana, Morelia, San Luis Potosí, Ciudad Victoria, and Nuevo Laredo the price of tortillas has risen, despite the fact that the average price of maize has dropped from MXN 3,500 to 2,500 per ton. However, the Director of the Maize Industry Council has defended the pact by minimizing the price increments in those cities, claiming that the pact was only intended for the Valley of Mexico, and not the whole country.

Guillermo Ortiz Martínez, governor of the Bank of Mexico, labeled the agreement "a success" for consumers, and urged for it to continue as means to combat rising inflation.
