= Tortilleria =

Shop that produces and sells tortillas

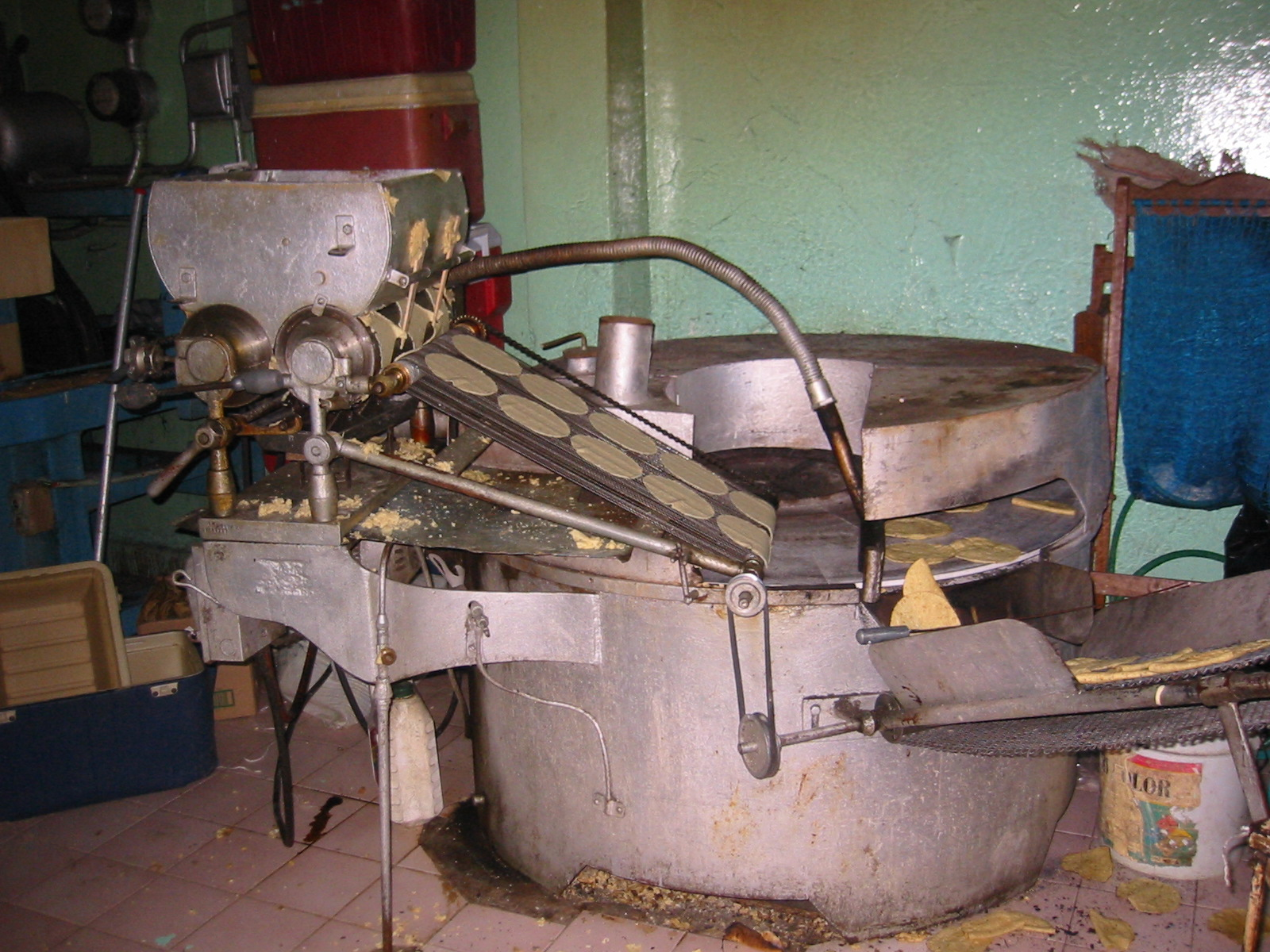
A tortilla machine inside a tortilleria

A tortilleria, or tortilla bakery is a shop that produces and sells freshly made tortillas. Tortillerias are native to Mexico and Central America, and some are being established in some areas of the United States. Tortillerias usually sell corn tortillas by weight. The recipe for tortilla dough, called masa, has not changed since ancient times; it is corn which has been treated with slaked lime and water.

== Methods of production ==
Some tortillerias produce tortillas from pre-made masa dough, others produce masa dough in-house from dried masa flour called masa harina, and others use the traditional method of soaking corn with lime.

== Effect of corn subsidies ==
Corn was subsidized in Mexico from 1974 to 1999, and the price of tortillas was capped by law. When subsidies and price controls ended, tortillerias had to adapt. The end of the subsidy was met with mixed reception. Some tortilleria owners saw the move as an opportunity to retain jobs and increase profits, while others expressed concern that higher tortilla prices would hurt low-income families who relied on tortillas as a staple food.

Before the end of subsidies many local tortillerias purchased prepared fresh masa dough from centralized mills, since government-subsidized corn was provided directly to these mills. After the end of subsidies dried masa harina flour was used, as dough mills lost their price advantage. Dried masa harina keeps much better than prepared masa. To encourage the switch to dry masa harina, manufacturers such as Maseca offered credits to tortillerias to upgrade to equipment capable of processing masa harina.

== See also ==
- Tortilla Price Stabilization Pact
