= Tortilla =

Round unleavened flatbread made of either nixtamlized corn or wheat

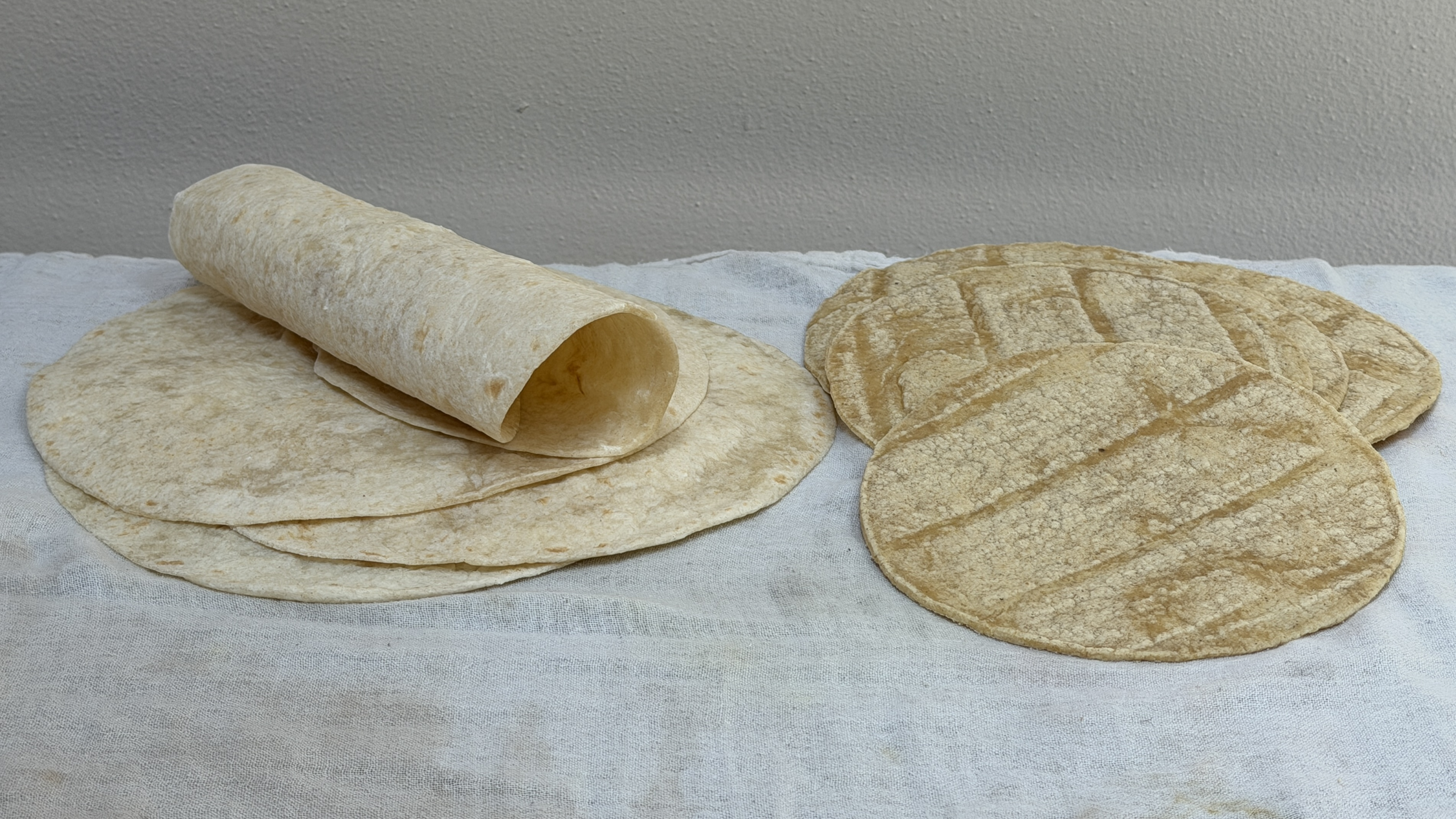
- Flour tortillas (left) and corn tortillas (right)
- Type: Flatbread
- Place of origin: Mesoamerica
- Region or state: Mexico, Central America, Southwestern United States; also worldwide
- Main ingredients: Either masa (nixtamalized corn dough) or wheat flour
- Variations: Corn tortilla, flour tortilla, tortilla chips

A tortilla (/tɔːrˈtiːə/ tor-TEE-ə, Spanish: [toɾˈtiʝa]) is a thin, circular unleavened flatbread, originally made from corn (maize) but now also made of wheat flour. The corn tortilla is a staple food in most of Mexico and Central America, while the flour tortilla is typical of Northern Mexican and Mexican-American cuisine. The tortilla has become popular across the world.

Corn tortillas are made by treating corn with limewater, a process known as nixtamalization, forming a dough known as masa, which is baked on a griddle. Flour tortillas are made of refined wheat flour, water, and shortening, and are generally larger than corn tortillas. Both types are commonly industrially produced, with corn tortillas usually using a dehydrated form of masa called masa harina. Tortillas are soft but quickly become stale. They are high in calories but lack essential nutrients.

Fresh tortillas can be used to carry various ingredients, forming dishes such as the taco, burrito, enchilada, and quesadilla. They may instead be used as a spoon to pick up accompanying food. Other uses of tortillas include dishes such as tortilla soup and fried products such as tostadas and tortilla chips.

Tortillas were first made by ancient peoples of Mesoamerica, where corn was an important crop. Corn tortillas became a cornerstone of Mesoamerican cuisine as complex societies formed, including the Oaxaca Valley and the Aztec civilization. Tortillas also spread to the Maya civilization. After the 16th-century Spanish conquest of Mexico, corn tortillas remained popular among indigenous communities. Flour tortillas were invented after the Spanish introduced wheat to Mexico, becoming common among settlers of Northern Mexico. The flour tortilla remained popular in parts of Mexico that became part of the United States, including Texas and California. Mass-produced tortillas became common in the 1950s, using tortilla machines and masa harina. Tortillas became common globally in the early 21st century.

The tortilla is the most consumed food in Mexican and Central American cuisine, as well as a national symbol of Mexico. Rural indigenous communities of Mexico frequently prepare corn tortillas at home, while the urban population purchases tortillas from bakeries known as tortillerias or from supermarkets. Tortillas are also common in the United States due to Hispanic influence on American cuisine. Mexican food establishments and manufacturers such as Gruma have made tortillas a global industry.

== Terminology ==
The word tortilla is derived from the Spanish word torta, meaning roughly 'cake', plus the diminutive suffix -illa; therefore, tortilla can be translated as 'little cake'. In Mexico, a tortilla bakery is known as a tortilleria; it is distinguished from a wheat bread bakery, or panadería. In Spanish cuisine, the word tortilla instead refers to a type of omelette.

In Nahuatl (spoken by the ancient Aztecs and modern Nahuas), tortillas are called tlaxcalli ([t͡ɬaʃˈkalli]). The Ancient Maya used the word cauhimich. The contemporary Maya languages use the word wah, originally a broader term for various corn products.

== Varieties ==
Tortillas are round unleavened flatbreads. They are very thin, consisting almost entirely of crust. There are two main types, corn tortillas and flour tortillas, which undergo vastly different processing. Industrially produced versions of both types are common, which have standardized recipes and mild flavor. Tortilla machines continuously produce them using dough sheeters and extruders; some can produce 30,000 per hour.

=== Corn ===
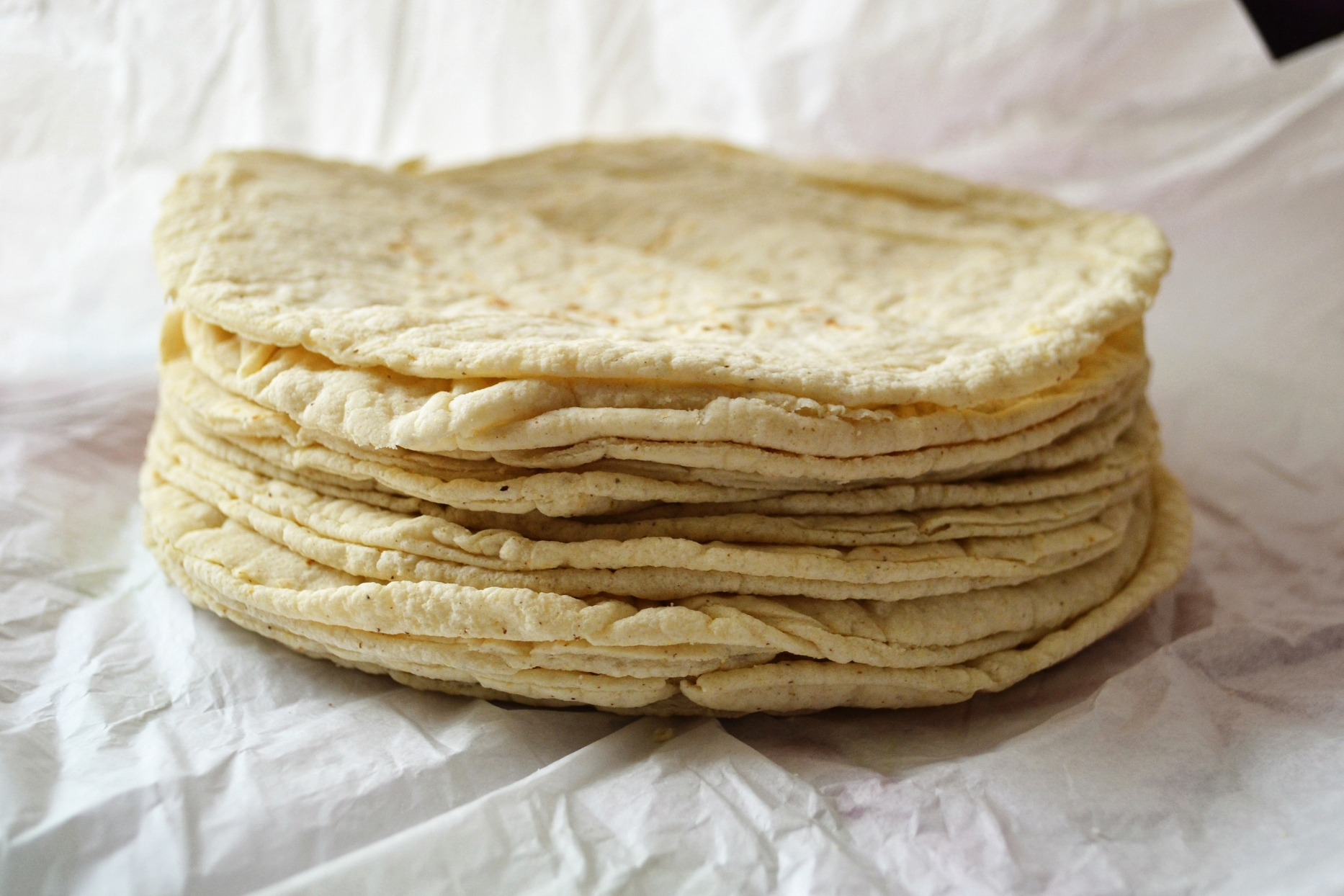
Corn tortillas

The ingredients of corn tortillas are corn (maize) and limewater (an alkaline solution of calcium hydroxide). They typically use white or yellow corn, though other varieties such as blue corn are occasionally used. The corn is soaked in limewater, a step known as nixtamalization. This step has the largest impact on the final product, increasing its flexibility and nutritional value. The nixtamalized corn, known as nixtamal, is stone-ground into a dough known as masa. The masa is flattened between the hands, against a flat surface, or using tortilla press. It is then baked on a griddle—or, in industrial settings, in an oven that performs continuous sheeting and baking. While baking, it undergoes reactions including browning and starch gelatinization, and it slightly puffs up. Corn tortillas are about 15 cm in diameter, while the thickness varies.

There are three methods of producing masa for tortillas. The traditional method involves cooking corn in a pot of limewater, then steeping it overnight and discarding the liquid; the resulting nixtamal is ground with a stone known as a metate to produce masa, which is hand-shaped and baked on both sides on a clay griddle known as a comal. Tortillas using this method are thicker than others. Fresh masa is industrially produced with a similar process using a rotating grinder. This is extruded and baked in an oven to produce tortillas. Dry masa, also known as masa harina, is produced by grinding nixtamal into pieces that are dried to form a flour. Masa harina is rehydrated to be baked into tortillas; this method is much easier, faster, and labor-saving than making fresh masa, and allows the production of masa to be separated from the production of tortillas both in time and place. The traditional method is used among indigenous peoples of Mexico and of Central America, while masa harina is the most common method in countries including the United States.

Corn tortillas are diverse. Large types of corn tortillas include the tlayuda, from Oaxacan cuisine, which can be over 40 cm (16 in) across and is baked to a drier texture. On the smaller end, a 10 cm (3.9 in) corn tortilla is known as a tortilla taquera (lit. 'taco maker's tortilla') in parts of Mexico. A tlacoyo is a thick, oval tortilla made of masa mixed with beans. A gordita is a very thick tortilla made of masa and lard, sometimes with fillings.

=== Wheat ===
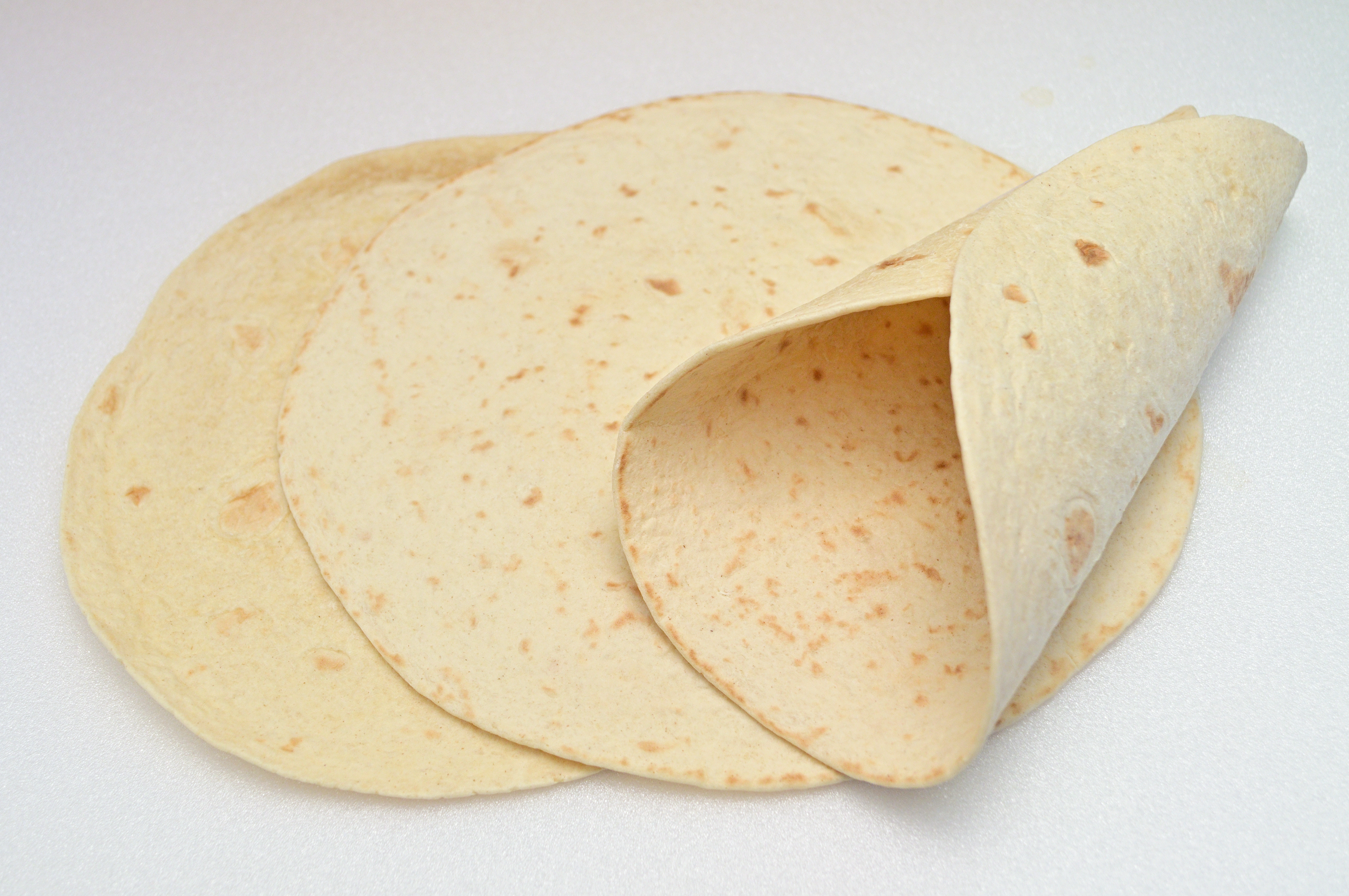
Flour tortillas

Flour tortillas are made of wheat flour—usually white flour—which is mixed with water, fat, and salt. Fat is used as shortening, which changes the flavor and texture, while water contributes to the development of gluten contained in the flour. Additionally, baking powder and other ingredients are typically used outside of Mexico and Central America. The ingredients are mixed into dough, then rested and shaped. They may puff up while baking due to steam leavening. Flour tortillas have a thickness of about 1–2 mm and a diameter of 15–60 cm, larger than corn tortillas. They have some dark spots, while the color of other spots is translucent.

In industrial production, most flour tortillas are hot pressed, while others are oven-baked after being die-cut or, less commonly, shaped by hand. Hot pressing results in an irregularly shaped, smooth, strong product (for dishes such as tacos). Die cutting, a cheaper method, results in a perfectly round, less moist product (for dishes such as burritos).

Internationally, many types of tortillas are sold. Some have dietary adaptations such as being low-fat or gluten-free, while others have flavors such as spinach or garlic. The wrap, a product sold in the United States, is a whole-wheat tortilla, often with flavorings. The term wrap is used rather than tortilla to lessen the perceived connection with Mexican cuisine.

=== Other varieties ===
Nixtamalized sorghum is sometimes mixed with corn for tortillas in Guatemala, Honduras, Nicaragua, and El Salvador. Tortillas may be made with only sorghum or with a mix of sorghum, corn and cassava. Quinoa is also used for tortillas.

== Serving ==
Tacos made of corn tortillas

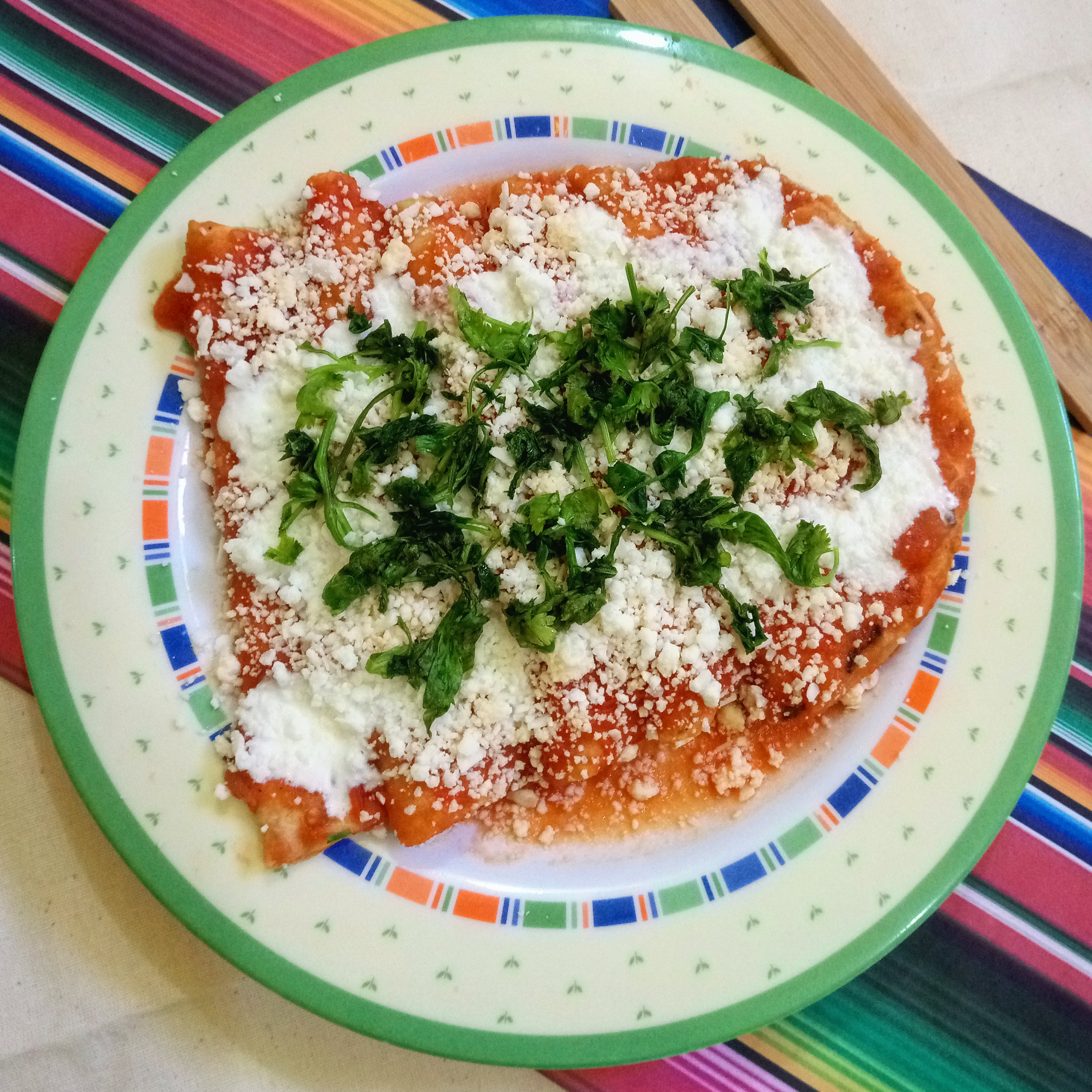
Enchiladas

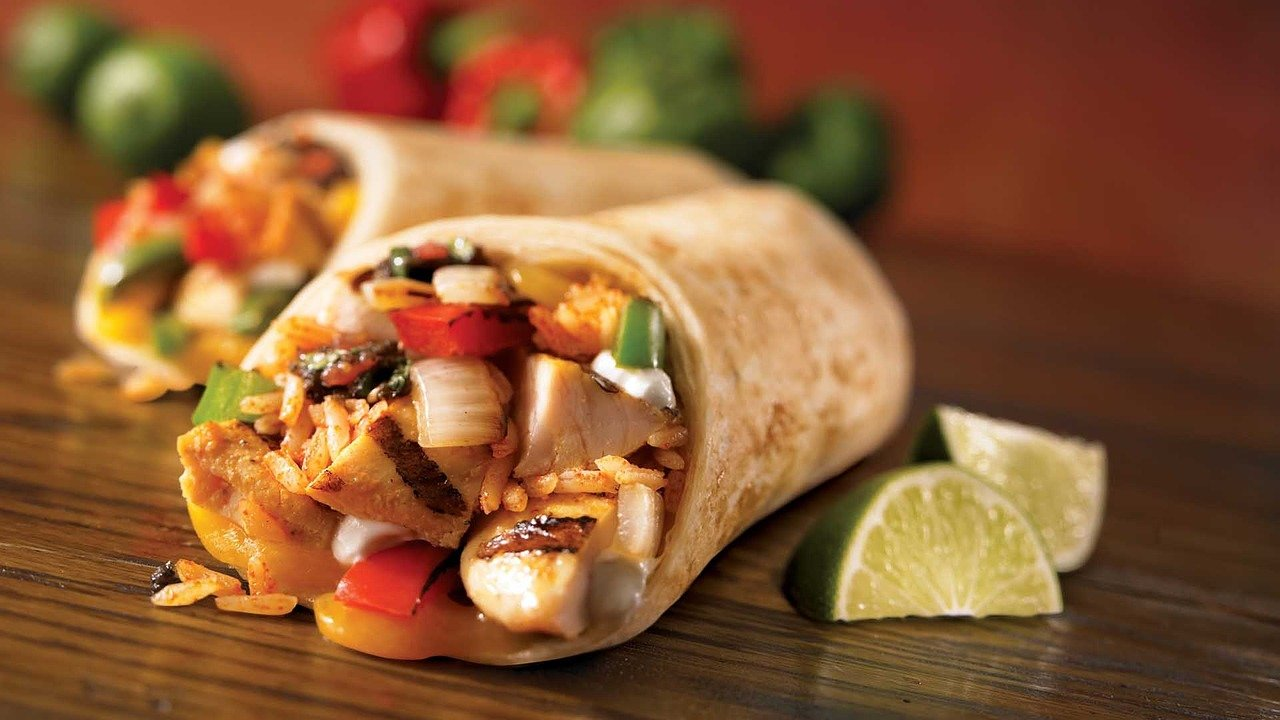
Burritos

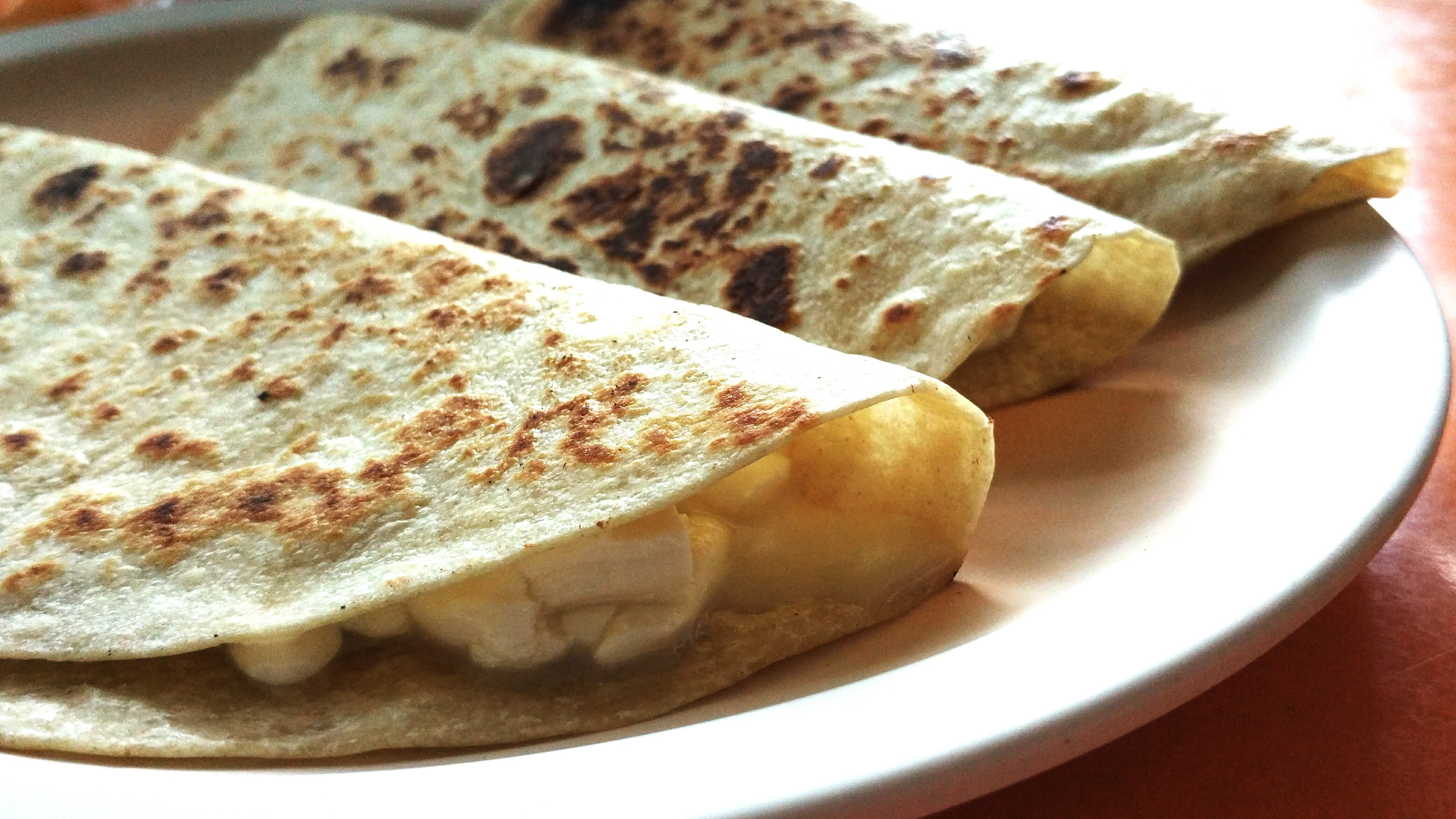
Quesadillas

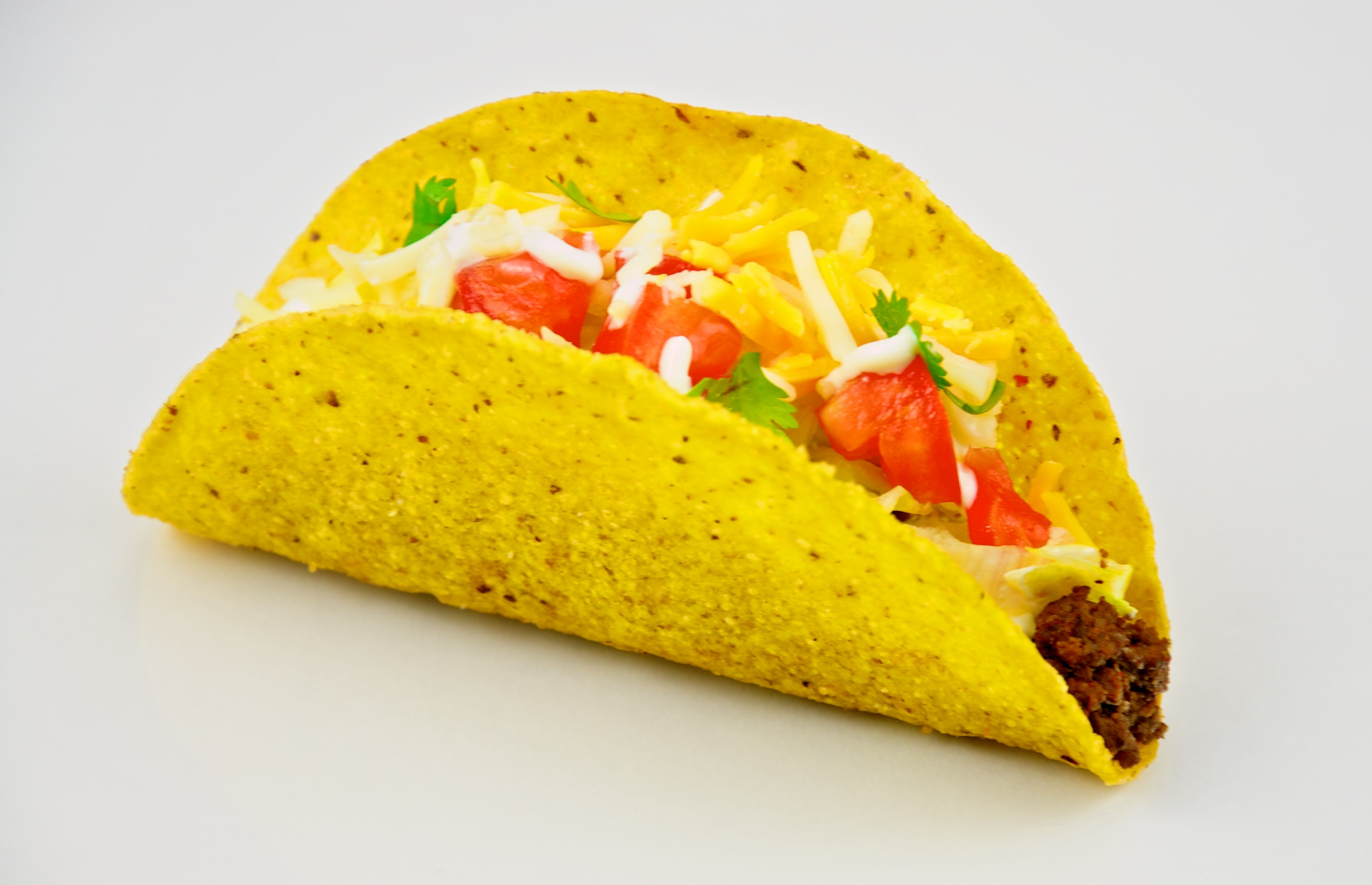
An American-style taco, using a taco shell

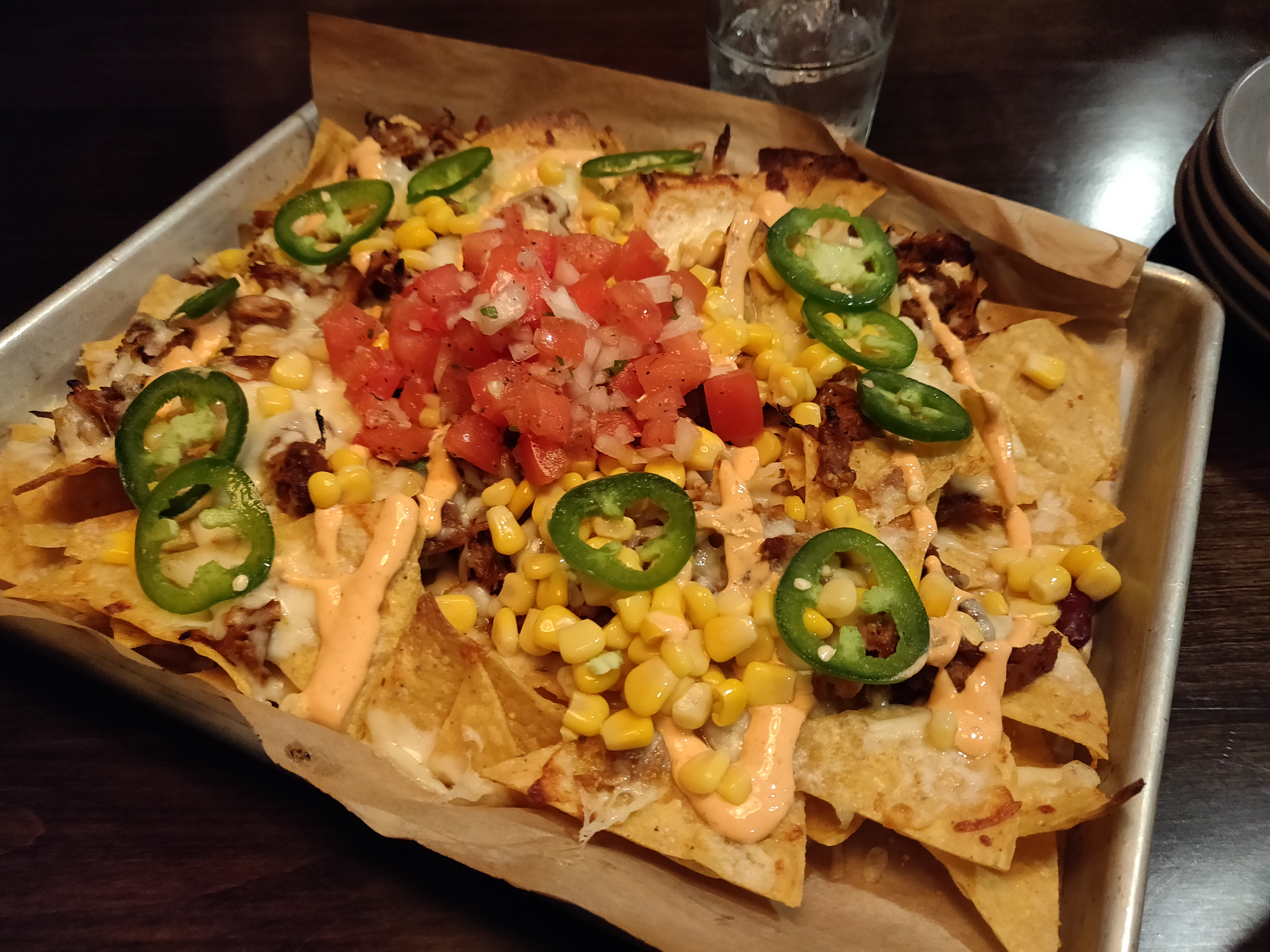
Nachos, using tortilla chips

Tortillas may be eaten for any meal. Corn and flour tortillas have similar uses. They are accompanied by foods such as meat, beans, vegetables, or eggs. (Note: The foods that accompany a tortilla are collectively known in Nahuatl as taballi.) A tortilla can function as a serving plate or as a utensil, tearing off small pieces and wrapping them around accompanying foods to eat by hand.

Many dishes use tortillas to carry other foods. Common fillings in tortilla-based dishes include refried beans, pulled meat, chorizo, scrambled eggs, or fish. Additionally, they may have salsa (a spicy sauce) and ingredients such as onion slices, lettuce, or guacamole, as well as herbs such as cilantro.

The most common use of fresh tortillas is the taco, which consists of a tortilla folded around a filling. The filling may simply be meat or vegetables, while a common type in Mexico combines meat, beans, and sauce. A burrito consists of a large flour tortilla rolled around a filling. An enchilada is also rolled, but the tortilla is covered in tomato sauce and fried; this often uses a corn tortilla that is dyed red. A quesadilla is a snack in which a tortilla is folded in half over a filling of cheese and other ingredients, then fried. A flauta is prepared like a taco, rolled, and then fried. For a panucho, the fillings are inserted inside the tortilla. Tortillas are also used for a category of sandwiches in American cuisine known as wraps.

Tortillas may instead be made into fried products, with the addition of salt or additional seasonings. This is a way to utilize tortillas that are partly stale. Fried corn tortillas are known as tostadas; these are served with toppings. Taco shells, in American cuisine, are tostadas that are bent rather than flat. These are used for the American style of taco, typically with ground beef, cheese, and lettuce. Tortilla chips are corn tortillas baked as triangles, circles, or strips, which are then fried and salted. (Note: Tortilla chips are distinct from corn chips, which are produced directly from masa that is not made into tortillas before frying.) Tortilla chips may be topped with cheese and jalapeños, forming nachos, or they may be coated in flavorings, to be sold as packaged snack products. Totopos are another fried corn tortilla product. Flour tortillas are fried into foods including taco bowls. A salbute is a fried tortilla made of both masa and wheat flour.

Stale tortillas may also be sliced and mixed into various dishes. For tortilla soup, they are sliced and fried to be used as a crouton. For other dishes, they are cut into strips like noodles. For example, chilaquiles are strips of tortilla covered in tomato sauce.

== Nutrition and properties ==
Both corn and flour tortillas are starchy, making them an excellent source of calories. Flour tortillas are higher in calories as they contain more fat. Both types are sources of fiber, with content between 5.4% and 16.45% in corn tortillas, and about 1.8% in flour tortillas. Their water content ranges is about 42–46%. Both types contain minor nutrients such as folic acid, policosanols, and tocopherols, as well as phytochemicals such as ferulic acid. In corn tortillas, the use of limewater significantly increases the content of calcium and magnesium and the digestibility of niacin, while removing toxins such as aflatoxins. They are the largest source of calories, protein, and calcium in Mexico and Central America.

Tortillas are not complete sources of protein as they lack two essential amino acids, lysine and tryptophan. They also lack vitamins A, B_{12}, D, and E as well as minerals including iron and zinc. Thus, they are often fortified with protein-rich ingredients such as soybeans or with vitamins and minerals. Corn tortillas are harder to modify as added ingredients strongly influence masa. Whole-grain versions of both types are produced to meet the standards of nutrition programs.

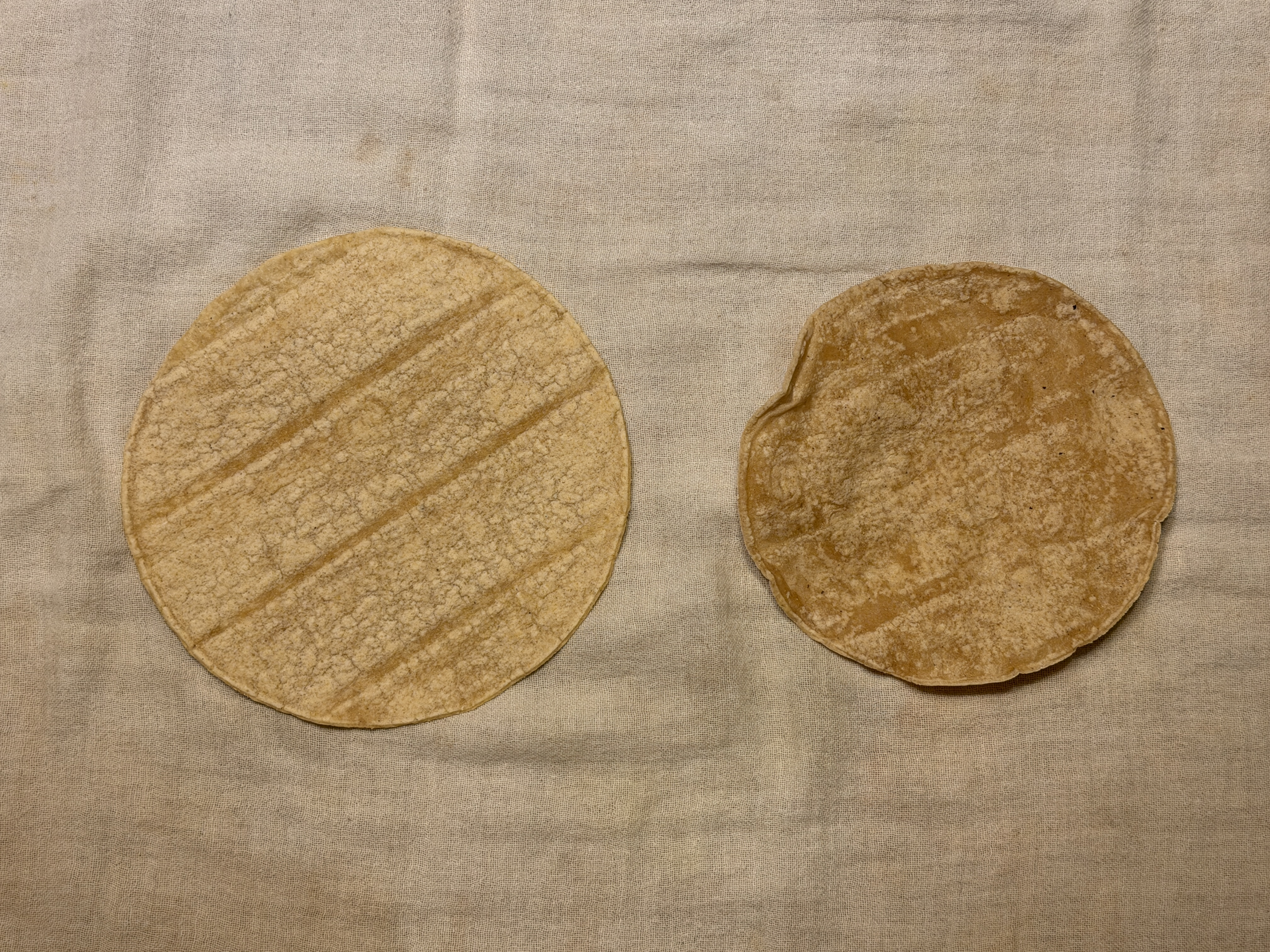
A fresh corn tortilla (left) and one that has become stale after a few weeks of refrigeration (right)

Pliability is an important quality of tortillas as they must be folded for dishes such as tacos. Other qualities desired by consumers include softness, structural integrity, a uniform shape, and a toasted appearance. Corn tortillas are soft while fresh but rapidly lose this texture. Flour tortillas are also soft and pliable and have a longer shelf life. Tortillas become hard and brittle once they are stale, though these may still be eaten, sometimes intentionally. Mold growth, rather than staling, is the main factor that decreases the shelf life of tortillas. Both types may grow mold after two days of storage. (Note: Molds that spoil tortillas include Aspergillus niger, Penicillium corylophilum, and Cladosporium.) Other factors that decrease shelf life include basic pH, high storage temperature, and poor packaging. They may use additives such as preservatives such as propionates or sorbates to avoid mold growth, while additives such as proteins, hydrocolloids, emulsifiers, and enzymes can limit staling. In a freezer, tortillas can last 6–12 months. For tortillas to be sold with long shelf lives, they are commonly preserved using vacuum packing, sometimes in combination with modified atmosphere packaging.

== History ==
=== Origin and early popularity ===
Corn was a staple food for all the ancient societies of Mesoamerica (modern-day Mexico and Central America) since its origin in the 6th millennium BC. Early Mesoamerican cultures used metates to grind corn into masa for various dishes. Nixtamalization was initially done using wood ash before the development of using lime.

The exact origin of tortillas is unknown. Archaeologically, tortillas are associated with the presence of the comal, which may have been designed for optimal tortilla baking but could have been used for other foods. (Note: Archaeologists have excavated potsherds of comals at various sites, dated to 500–300 BC in the Oaxaca Valley and to 200–650 AD in the Valley of Mexico (including Teotihuacan).) Remnants of a comal and processed lime dating to circa 700 BC have been found at the Chalcatzingo archaeological site in the Mexican state of Morelos, likely evidence of tortillas. Folk explanations for the origin of the tortilla include an Aztec tale of a peasant improvising food for a king.

Tortillas were a development of complex societies such as city-states, requiring specialized labor, tools, and resources. They became popular as a convenient and palatable food that could easily be carried by workers. In the Oaxaca Valley, which experienced economic and population growth around 500–100 BC, tortillas were packed for lunch by farmers working beyond the household, creating an early form of the taco. The Aztecs were initially nomadic and created simple tortillas without nixtamal before they established cities such as Tenochtitlán. The Maya used masa to make tamales rather than tortillas, which were likely introduced much later by migrants from Central Mexico.

Tortillas became a widespread food in Mesoamerica during the Classic period, which began in 300 BC. They held religious significance as corn was sacred in Mesoamerican religions. Ancient Mesoamericans used various types of corn for tortillas, which typically had a diameter of about eight fingers, while the thickness varied. They ate them with beans or chile sauce. The Aztecs also created a food similar to tortilla chips, totopotchli, consisting of wedges of tortillas toasted on a griddle.

=== Aztec Empire ===
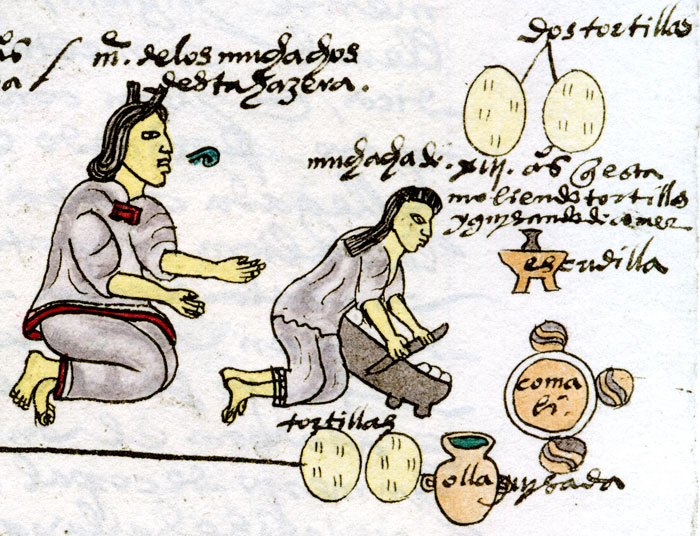
Tortilla production, depicted in the Aztec Codex Mendoza

Tortillas were the basis of Aztec cuisine, with a typical meal including tortillas, a bean dish, and a sauce. The proper way to eat a tortilla was to gently fold it and take multiple bites. Aztec girls learned to make tortillas before they were fifteen, and the ability to cook good tortillas was considered virtuous. Children's servings of tortillas were determined by specific, age-based rules, from half a tortilla at ages 3–6 to two tortillas starting from age 13. Tortillas were important to many aspects of Aztec religion, such as offerings to deities, and culture, being featured in Aztec poetry and ceramic art. To the Aztecs, tortillas had souls.

Tortillas were eaten by all social classes of Tenochtitlán. Peasant families made tortillas every day. Warriors brought tortillas to battle. Street food vendors at marketplaces sold tortillas with ingredients such as squash, nopales, and amaranth seeds, as well as tacos with scrambled turkey eggs, a street food for the wealthy. Some types of tortillas were created for Aztec nobility and emperors. The last independent Aztec emperor, Moctezuma II, ate tortillas including versions made with eggs and versions shaped like butterflies or leaves. A version uniquely prepared for him and the nobility was made of red corn, linseed flowers, and various medicinal herbs and roots. The simplest tortillas, made without nixtamal, were eaten during Aztec fasts.

As the Maya city-states saw Aztec influence, tortillas became as important as tamales. The Maya of the Yucatán ate tortillas with beans and chile sauce for dinner, and also used them for the dish papadzules, resembling enchiladas. Meanwhile, the Otomi of Central Mexico observed rituals such as painting tortillas for special occasions, as they do in the modern day; they used imagery from their religion before the introduction of Christianity.

=== Spanish conquest ===
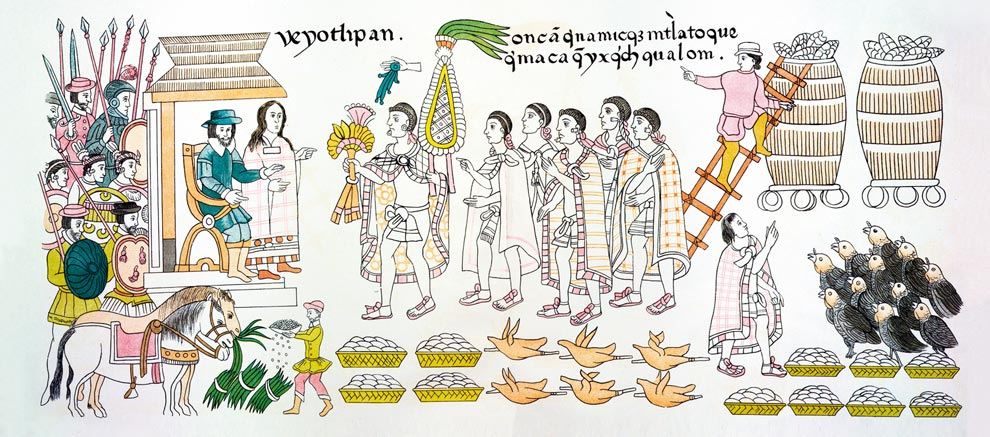
Hernan Cortés (seated) receiving tortillas and other gifts from the Aztecs

The Spanish conquest of the Aztec Empire began when Hernan Cortés, a conquistador, came to Mexico in 1519. He first ate tortillas as a gift from Moctezuma in 1519. Moctezuma's ambassador, Teoctlamacazqui greeted Cortés and his troops, giving tortillas to them and their horses. Cortés tried various tortillas but considered them inferior to European-style loaf bread. As Cortés's troops went further into the country, their primary subsistence was tortillas, which villagers gave them. Cortés introduced the term tortilla, replacing tlaxcalli, in his efforts to erase Aztec culture.

Wheat, the most important crop in Europe, was brought to Mexico once the conquest began. As the Spanish defeated the Aztec and replaced Tenochtitlán with Mexico City, capital of New Spain, they planted wheat, installed ovens to bake loaf bread, and built a new market without tortillas. The introduction of wheat also led indigenous people to use it for tortillas, though these did not yet use shortening. Some Spanish farmers grew corn, a more efficient crop, but the Spanish looked down upon tortillas. They found tortillas flavorless and believed that Europeans were healthiest eating European foods. The tortilla did not spread to Europe, unlike corn and other products from the Americas. Most Indigenous Mexicans still primarily ate tortillas, as long as corn was available. Spanish missionary Bernardino de Sahagún documented the popularity and variety of tortillas among the Aztecs. As missionaries converted indigenous peoples to Catholicism, they incorporated tortillas into rituals such as using them as Communion bread, despite Catholic law requiring wheat.

=== Expansion of Mexico and flour tortillas ===
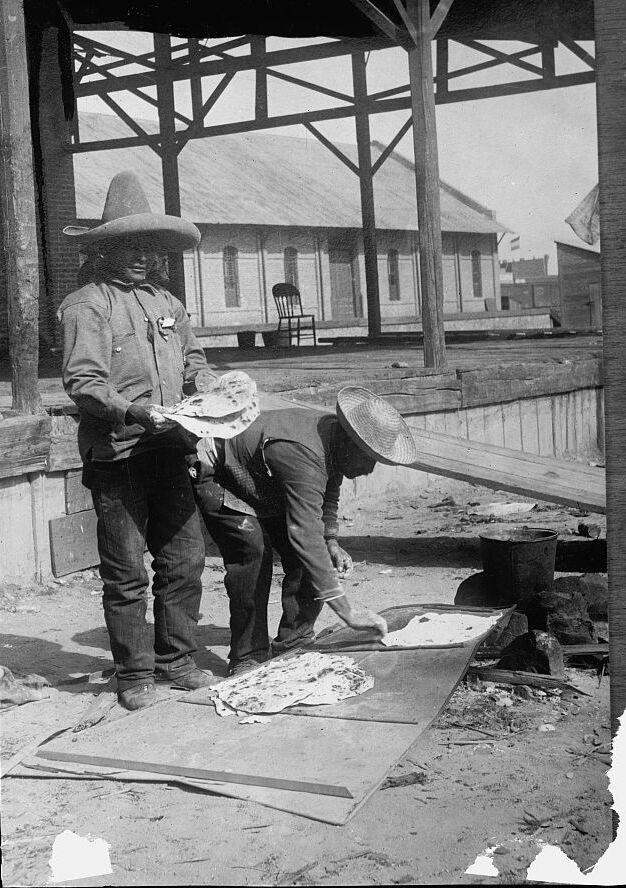
Tortilla making in Ciudad Juárez, early 20th century

From Mexico, the Spanish expanded north into areas including Sonora. After 1687 Jesuit mission led by Eusebio Kino introduced wheat to Sonora, the region became a major producer of the crop. Settlers of the northern frontier formed a distinct, wheat-centric culture. They created flour tortillas, introducing lard to the recipe. On the northern frontier, flour tortillas were rolled out as large as 18 inches, known as a tortilla grande de harina, or as small as 8 inches. Sonorans wrapped flour tortillas around grilled beef, forming the burrito. Flour tortillas became part of the regional identity of Northern Mexico; they were made of local wheat and quick to prepare. Corn tortillas were still part of the regional identity of Central Mexico, where corn was easier to grow, and the locals preferred the taste of corn tortillas.

Mexicans settled Texas on a large scale in the 18th century; identifying with the northern frontier culture and the Hispanic identity, they ate flour tortillas. After Texas received Anglo-American migrants and became part of the United States in 1848, Mexican Texans continued to eat tortillas with their meals. Despite racial tensions, flour tortillas were popular among all cultures in Texas and the rest of the Southwestern United States. Americans migrating west to California ate tortillas, sometimes as burritos. As Anglo-Californians replaced Mexican Californians as the dominant cultural group, they rejected Mexican foods, except for the beef burrito. Corn tortillas also existed in California due to Central Mexican influence.

From 1876 to 1911, Mexico was led by President Porfirio Diaz, who believed in modernization and derided traditions such as the corn tortilla. Corn tortillas remained nutritionally and culturally important for most Mexicans.

=== Industrialization and global spread ===
Tortilla Makers by Diego Rivera (1926)

In the era after the end of the Mexican Revolution in 1920, tortilla making became more efficient. Rural communities gained access to electricity, so housewives could bring nixtamal to a mechanical mill rather than grind it by hand, and they could buy tortilla presses from stores. Many women entered the workforce in cities, so they purchased tortillas from tortillerias rather than making them. Most neighborhoods had tortillerias by 1930. As tortilla making became a business, men began doing it as a job. At tortilla factories and nixtamal mills, men and women worked in poor conditions, leading to unionization. Meanwhile, the tortilla became a national symbol amid growing Mexican nationalism among the middle class. Still, bread remained the staple of wealthy mestizo communities, while tortillas were the staple of poor indigenous communities.

The tortilla machine gained wide use in the 1950s. Masa harina was invented to enable the mass production of corn tortillas. While wheat flour was fairly easy to process in machines, masa was very sticky, so it caused blockages and was hard to shape. The first commercial masa harina in Mexico was Maseca, founded 1949, which became the first product of Gruma Corporation. The 20th-century Mexican government supported tortilla production through "Tortilla Welfare" policies. A state-funded masa harina producer, Minsa, was founded in 1950. Minsa and Maseca were the only major masa harina companies for decades. The government supported masa harina while restricting the supply of fresh corn to stabilize tortilla prices, a policy that was widely supported as it efficiently provided food for the population. The use of masa harina for tortillas was appreciated by tortilla factories, as it was consistent and could easily incorporate additives, as well as working families, as it was quick and cheap. Producers of fresh masa saw a decline while flour mills saw growth, though some consumers still preferred tortillas made of fresh masa, which were more flavorful. Masa harina rapidly spread and contributed to the global reach of the tortilla industry.

By the 1950s, tacos were widespread in Texas and California as part of their respective Tex-Mex and Cal-Mex cuisines. Nachos originated in 1943, improvised by Ignacio "Nacho" Anaya, the maître d'hôtel at a restaurant in Piedras Negras, Coahuila, on the Texan border. The taco shell was popularized by the fast food chain Taco Bell, founded by Glen Bell in California in 1962. Taco Bell spread across the country, making tacos familiar among Americans beyond the Southwest. Tortilla chips also became popular.

Technological advancements enabled tortillas to be made on a very large scale with low prices. The number of tortilla factories in Mexico increased from 2,214 in 1945 to 23,216 in 1980. Tortilla purchases shifted from tortillerias to mass producers, contributing to the growth of companies such as Gruma, including its American subsidiary Mission Foods. Masa harina production saw a large increase around the turn of the 21st century. Still, 60% of Mexico's population used fresh masa for tortillas in 2004. Due to their popularity, nutritional initiatives worked to fortify corn tortillas. A decrease in global corn production in 2006–2007 led to a sharp increase in the price of tortillas in Mexico, resulting in a period of protests known as the Tortilla Crisis. In response, President Felipe Calderón introduced the Tortilla Price Stabilization Pact, in which several producers implemented a price ceiling.

In the early 21st century, sales of tortillas increased in the United States and other countries, being widely available at grocery stores and used for wraps at restaurants and take-out establishments. Global sales reached $9 billion in 2002 (equivalent to $16 billion in 2025). Sales in the United States reached $6 billion in 2006 (equivalent to $10 billion in 2025), with an annual growth rate of 9%, before reaching $9 billion in 2009 (equivalent to $14 billion in 2025, with an annual growth rate of 57%. Tortillas became popular in Europe and Asia. For example, in the United Kingdom, wheat tortilla sales increased by 17% in 2010. In Mexico, however, consumption of corn tortillas decreased—from a daily average of 249 kilograms (548 lb) in 2002 to 157 kilograms (346 lb) in 2010—as consumers shifted to other foods.

== Consumption ==
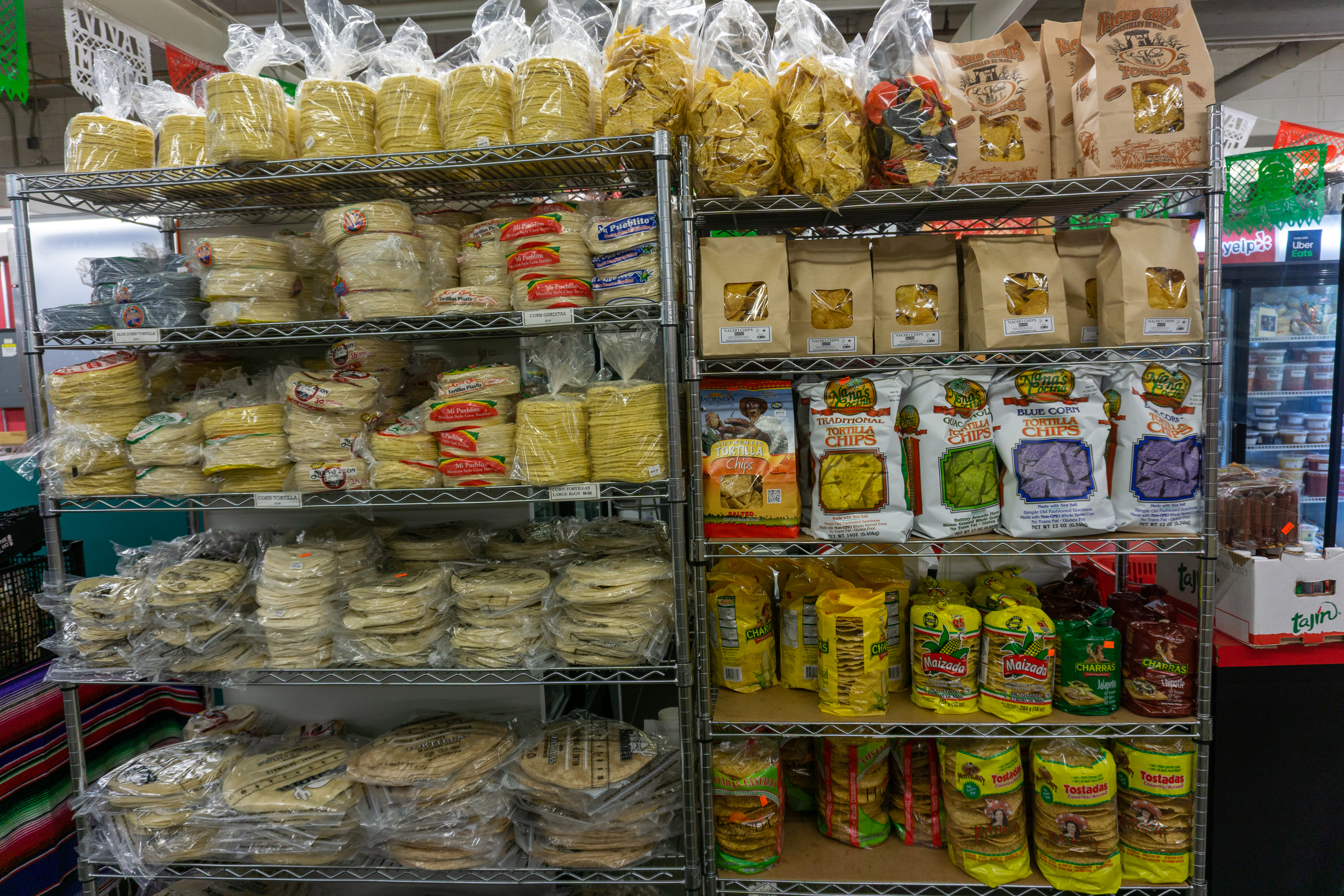
Tortillas and tortilla products sold at a grocery store

Tortillas are popular as they use commonly available ingredients. About 1.4 billion tortillas are eaten every day. The market size for tortillas, as of 2012, is about $12 billion, with another $10 billion for related products including tacos and tortilla chips. The world's production of tortillas is 42% in Mexico, 36% in the United States, and 9% in Central America, as of 2004. The average annual consumption of tortillas, as of 2001, is 85 kilograms (187 lb) in Mexico—or as high as 120 kilograms (260 lb) in some regions of the country—as well as 6 kilograms (13 lb) in the United States and 0.3 kilograms (0.66 lb) in Europe. The largest tortilla company is Gruma, with global sales of $4.2 billion in 2011 (equivalent to $6 billion in 2025).

Many people eat tortillas for every meal. Some prepare them fresh at home, which requires hours of labor every day. Others purchase tortillas for everyday consumption, reserving homemade tortillas for special occasions. Automated machines are used by tortillerias, small businesses dedicated to tortilla-making, as well as supermarkets, which sell tortillas at lower prices. Tortilla mislabeling occurs when tortilla products are incorrectly labeled in their ingredients or dietary claims. Some small-scale tortillerias sell handmade, but these are much more expensive than those using machines. Many chefs create unique variations of tortillas; for example, the Mexico City restaurant Pujol serves a corn tortilla filled with eggs and beans, Los Angeles-based chef John Rivera Sedlar presses flower petals into corn tortillas, and Tucson-based chef Janos Wilder mixes local native ingredients into flour tortillas. Tortilla chips and tostadas are sold as snack foods or used in fast food dishes.

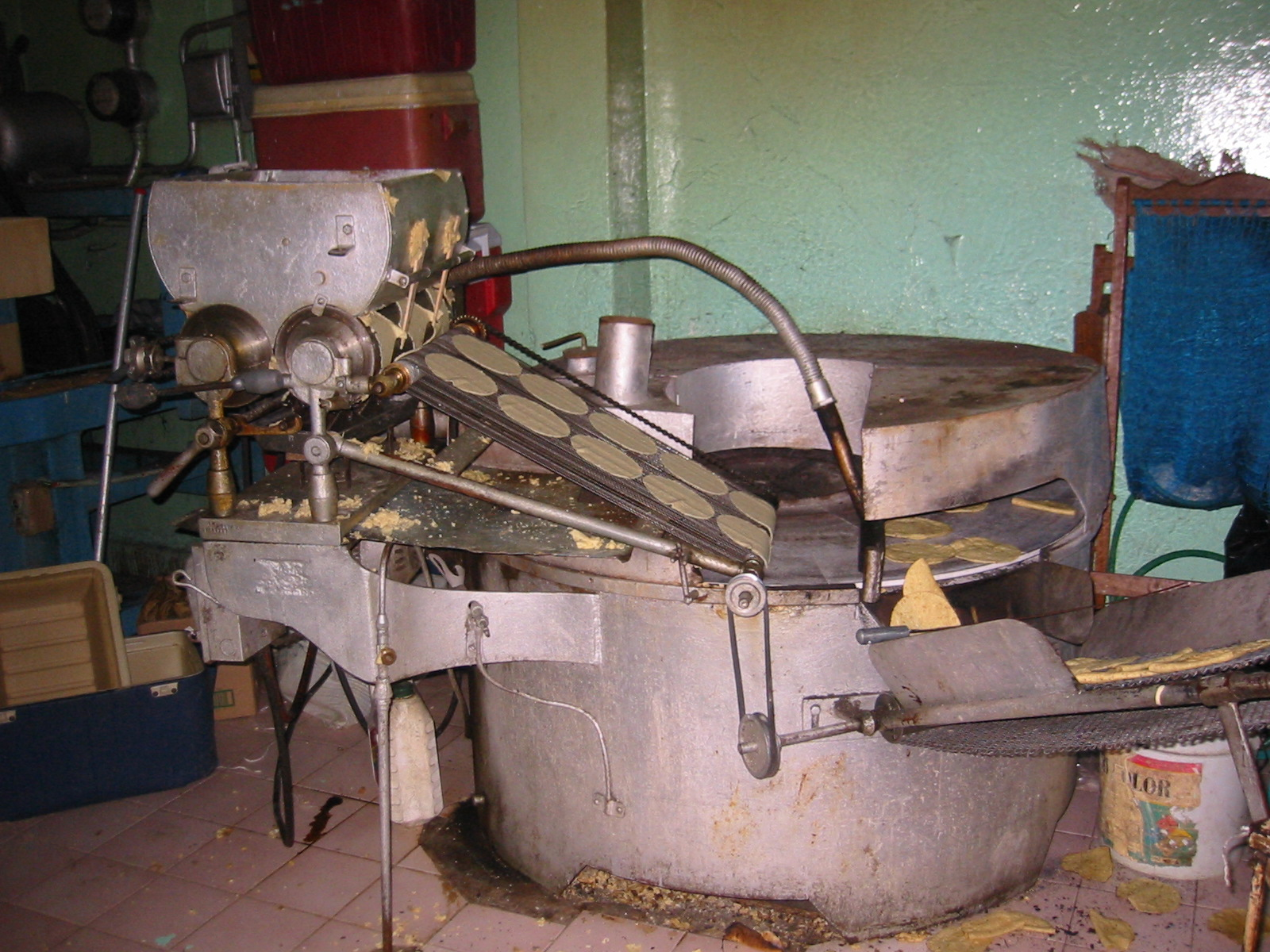
A tortilla machine

Economically, tortillas are an inferior good as they are more common among consumers with lower incomes. They can be a commodity, as they provide interchangeable culinary and nutritional value. Because they are a staple food, demand does not decrease during crises. (Note: For example, a survey of low-income households during the COVID-19 pandemic in Mexico found that 87% of households maintained their pre-pandemic tortilla consumption.) Some households rely on tortillas even when a crisis increases the price; thus, they can be considered a Giffen good, for which demand increases as price increases. (Note: Economist David McKenzie argues that tortillas in Mexico are not a Giffen good as other products are available as substitutes; Jorge López Arévalo et al. argue that this is not the case for low-income households that cannot afford these options.) Price elasticity of tortillas in Mexico is very high, as exemplified by the Tortilla Crisis of 2006–2007. The price of tortillas increases faster than the price of corn. The production of masa harina is concentrated by a few firms, forming an oligopoly that influences the price of tortillas. The Mexican public discusses the price of tortillas as an indicator of the state of the economy.

=== Mexico and Central America ===
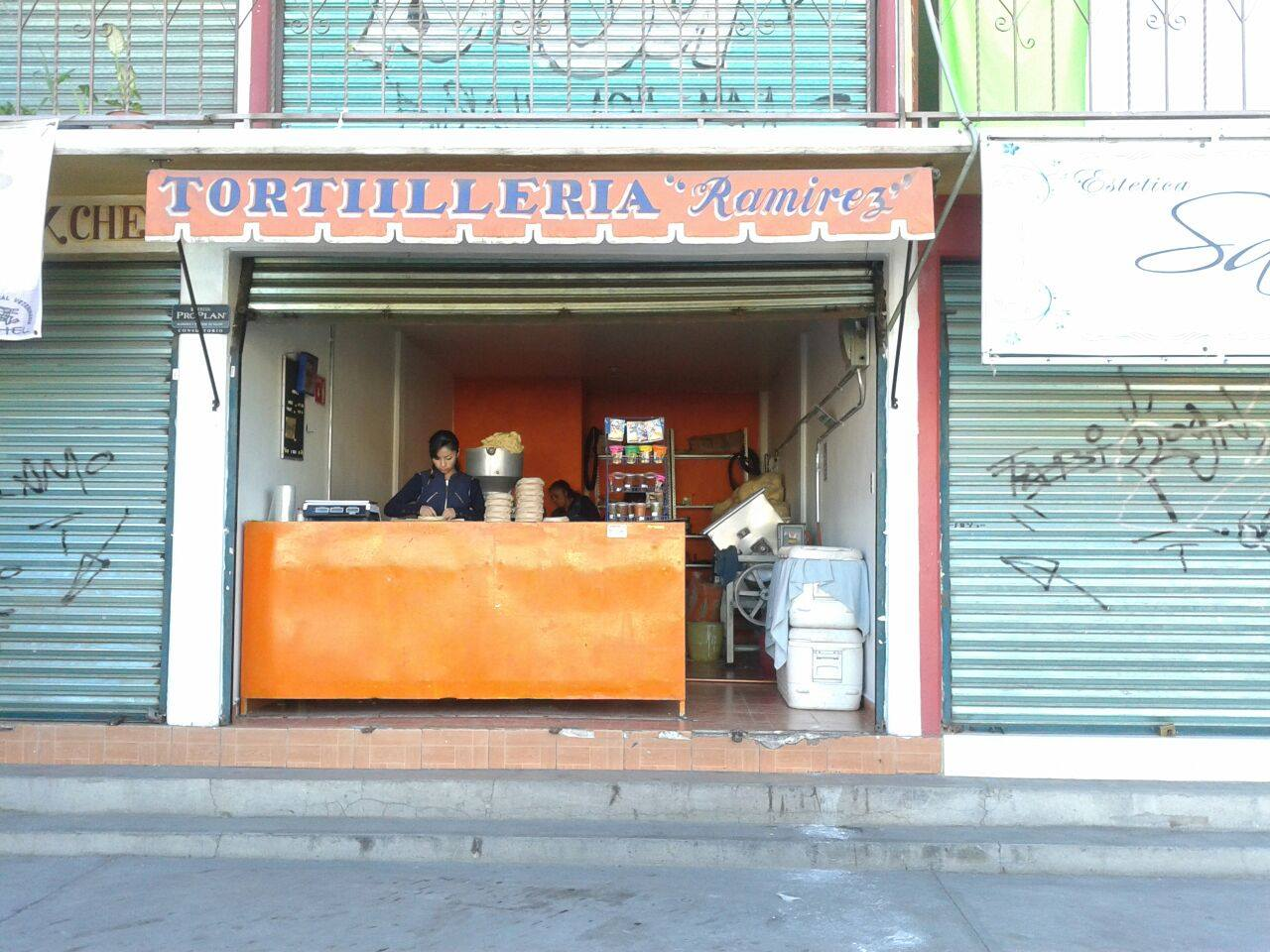
Most tortillas in Mexico are purchased from tortillerias.

In Mexican and Central American cuisine, 98% of tortillas are made of corn. Tortillas are a staple food in most of this region, with corn tortillas being the region's most consumed type of food.

Tortillas are considered the national bread of Mexico. Tortillas are more common among Mexico's rural population, with the average daily consumption per person being 56.7 kg (125 lb) in urban areas and 79.5 kg (175 lb) in rural areas. Tortilla production is Mexico's fourth-largest industry, comprising 0.9% of its GDP and 40% of its corn use, as of 2004. Annually, about 9 million tons of soft corn tortillas are produced in the country, of which 41% use traditional masa, 37% use fresh masa, and 23% use masa harina, as of 2016.

As of 2022, 80% of the country's tortillas are from tortillerias, 10% are from supermarkets, and 10% are homemade. (Note: These figures come from official statistics that exclude informal enterprises as well as factories that make highly processed tortillas.) Making tortillas from scratch is typical for the rural indigenous population, although this is declining in the modern day. In Maya villages, tortillas are typically made by women, while men partake in the harvesting of maize on milpa farming. Though this has decreased in the modern day, some communities consider knowledge of tortilla making an essential skill for a woman to be ready for married life. The urban population, including indigenous people, purchases machine-made tortillas. Tortillerias are typical of urban areas across the country. They face competition from white bread.

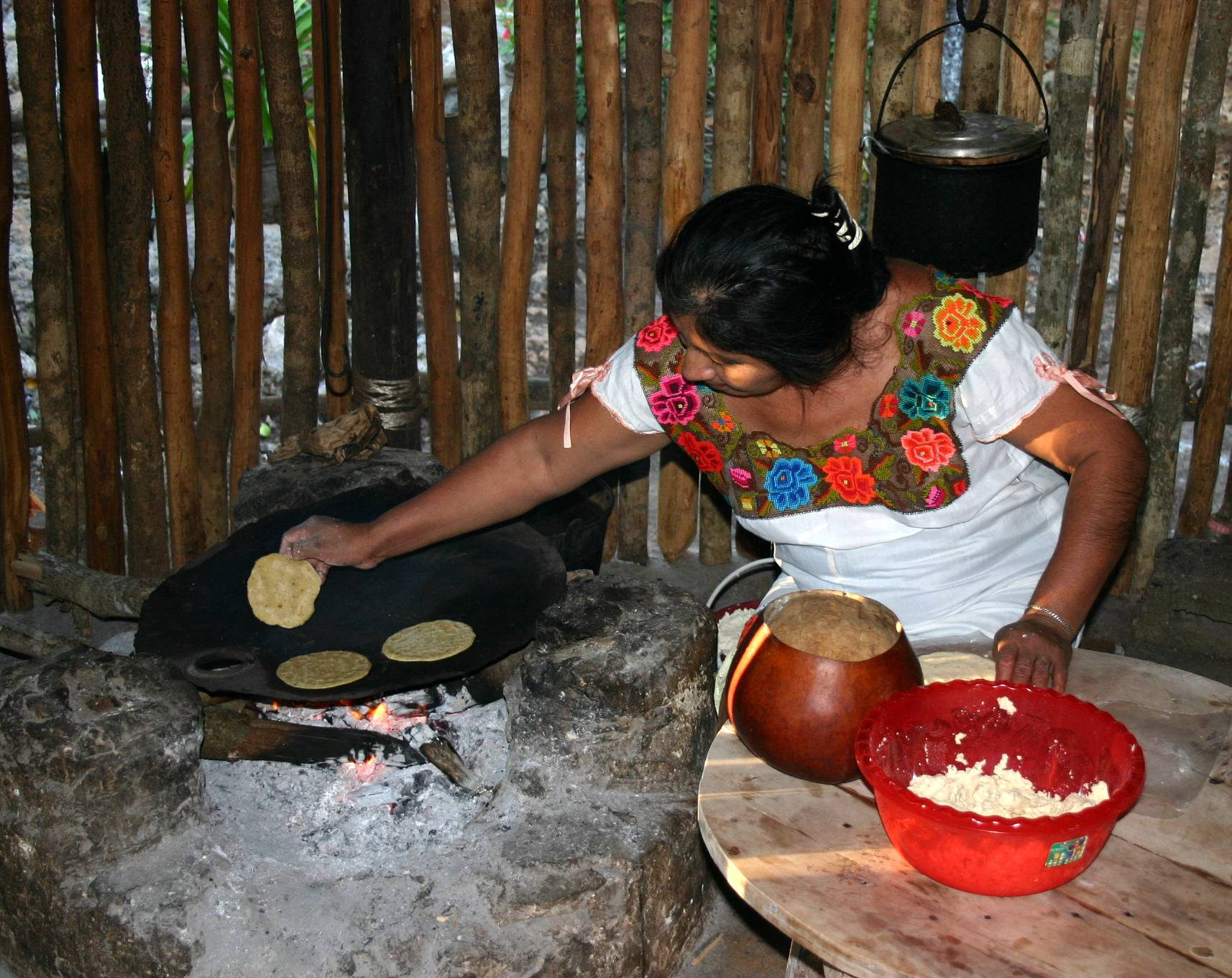
Homemade tortillas are common in indigenous communities, including among the Maya.

Flour tortillas are common in Northern Mexican cuisine. The state of Sonora has flour tortillas as large as 60 cm (24 in) across. Corn tortillas are eaten across Mexico but are more significant in Central and Southern Mexico, where there are high indigenous and mestizo populations. Corn tortillas are particularly common among Mexicans who identify with ancient Mexican culture. Tortillas are ubiquitous in contemporary Maya cuisine. The Maya eat tortillas for every meal, even when other starches are present. Rural Maya people eat from communal pots with tortillas rather than plates and cutlery. Maya tortillas are flattened against a leaf or plastic sheet, rather than between the hands, and they are so small that an adult male villager typically eats 30–50 in a day. In contrast, the indigenous peoples of Oaxaca eat tortillas big enough that only one is needed for a meal. Oaxaca's tortillas are also the thinnest in the country, while Guadalajara's tortillas are thick. Blue corn tortillas are eaten in the Central Mexican highlands.

Tortillas are common in Central American cuisine due to the influence of indigenous groups such as the Maya. Some parts of Central America have their own variants of tortillas, including the Nicaraguan güirila. Tortillas are one of the staples of Nicaraguan cuisine, alongside wheat bread and plantains. The Nicaraguan tortilla is large and serves as a plate, sometimes with multiple tortillas stacked. In Guatemalan cuisine, tortillas are common across the country, often using corn grown by Qʼeqchiʼ Maya farmers. Tortillas are considered an important part of a meal in the cuisine of El Salvador, where corn is a historically important staple. Tortillas are also considered a defining dish of Costa Rican cuisine, reflecting a cultural connection with the rest of Mesoamerica.

=== United States ===
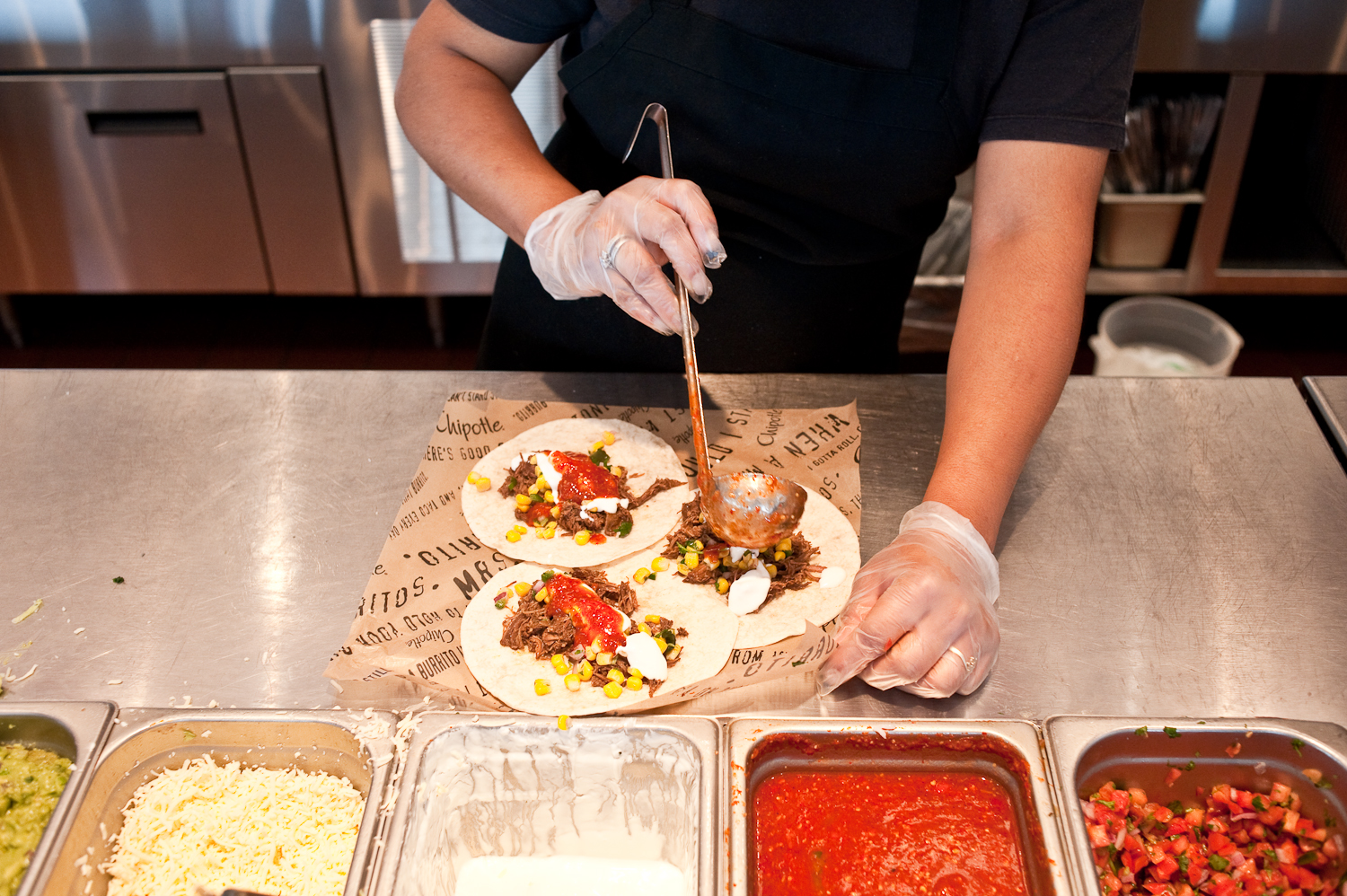
Flour tortillas are commonly part of fast food in the United States.

In the United States, tortillas are the second-most consumed baked good, behind white bread, comprising 32% of baked goods sales as of 2015. Annually, about 120 million tortillas are consumed in the country, as of 2016. Flour tortillas are particularly popular in the country, with annual sales of $4 billion (as of 2016), though corn tortillas are sold almost equally as much. American flour tortillas are often designed to increase shelf life, due to a preference for buying food infrequently to refrigerate and eat over several weeks. As of 2014, the largest tortilla producer in the United States is Gruma, followed by Tyson Foods.

The popularity of the tortilla has spread from the country's very large Hispanic population to other groups, to the point that it is not considered an ethnic food. Its popularity parallels that of sliced bread in some non-Hispanic households. Households purchase tortillas to prepare dishes at home. Unlike in Mexico and Central America, tortillas are not as large of a source of nutrition in the United States as Americans eat more balanced diets.

Mexican-American cuisine frequently uses flour tortillas for burritos, corn tortilla shells for hard tacos, and tortilla chips for chips and salsa. Other tortilla dishes including quesadillas, flautas, gorditas, and sopaipillas are familiar among non-Hispanic Americans. Tortillas are a traditional part of cuisine of the Southwestern United States; their status as a common food extends to parts of the Great Plains adjacent to the Southwest. Flour tortillas are widely used for fast food in the United States and Canada.

=== Elsewhere ===
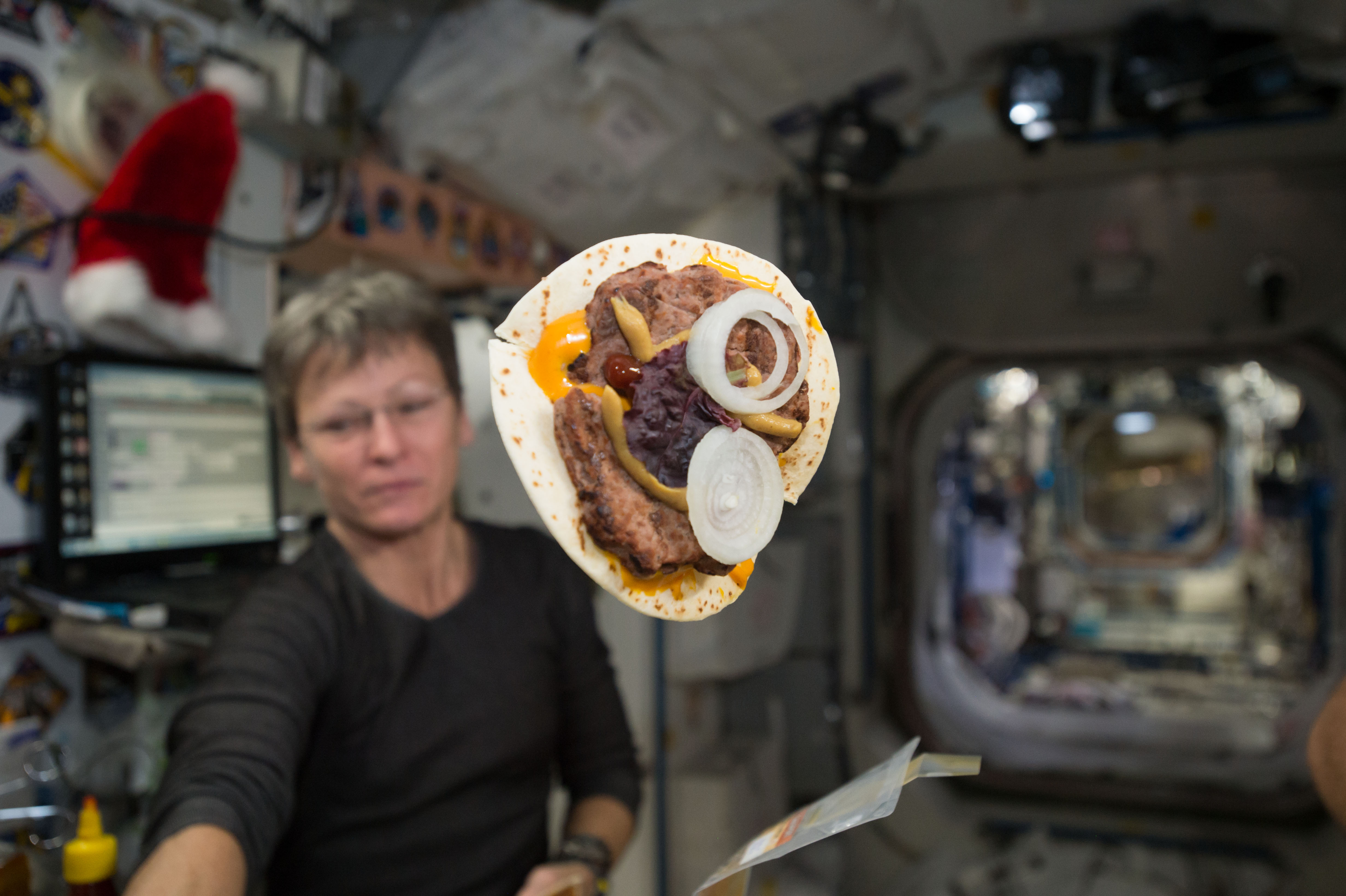
A tortilla aboard the International Space Station

Tortillas are manufactured across the world and are the most recognized Mexican food outside of Mexico. Automated production has enabled their popularity in many regions. Flour tortillas are the most common type outside of Mexico and Central America, particularly in places where wheat is a staple. They have become common globally as the basis of dishes served at Mexican restaurants and fast food establishments, and their popularity parallels that of local wheat breads in some places. Corn tortillas are also found worldwide, while the taco shell has shaped perceptions of Mexican cuisine. Tortilla chips are mostly common in developed countries.

Tortilla producers such as Gruma and Old El Paso have global presences. In Australia, tortillas are commonly found in grocery stores; the country's tortilla production is dominated by Gruma's Mission Foods, though there is also a market for small-scale producers of fresh tortillas. In China, flour tortillas are used for spring rolls. In the United Kingdom, they are used for wraps using familiar sandwich ingredients, as many people believe them to be healthier than sandwich bread. Flour tortillas are also eaten in space, as they are versatile and shelf-stable and do not cause crumbs; astronaut Sandra Magnus said, "you can do so much with a tortilla".

== In culture ==
The Grinder by Diego Rivera (1924)

The tortilla is a national symbol of Mexico, seen as a unifier of the country's races and classes. Indigenous communities take pride in their local tortillas. Among Mexicans, cultural perceptions of the tortilla associate it with corn and imagery of rural farmers. Perhaps as a reaction to the ubiquity of homogenous, industrial tortillas, Mexican consumers view rural farmers as making the most authentic tortillas.

Artistic depictions of tortillas include Diego Rivera's paintings Tortilla Makers and The Grinder, which both depict idealized images of peasant women, reflecting the tortilla's use as a national symbol. The Mexico–United States border wall, constructed in 1994, has been nicknamed the "Tortilla Wall"; the term employs the symbolism of migrants carrying tortillas, but some Hispanic people have felt that it used tortillas as an offensive stereotype. The tortilla is also used as a metaphor for flatness. For example, the Zócalo, a large plaza in Mexico City, is nicknamed the "Gran Tortilla".

The tortilla features in many aspects of Mexican culture. On the Day of the Dead, tortillas are offered to the spirits of ancestors. Followers of the Maya religion also offer tortillas to the dead, with the Tzotzil Maya using burnt tortillas. Tortillas are also offered to deities; some Maya communities believe that flames of candles or incense transform into tortillas in heaven. Maya Catholics use tortillas and atole in place of bread and wine during the Eucharist. The Otomi of the state of Querétaro have a unique tradition of painting tortillas for special occasions, such as Catholic feast days. In Mixtec culture, tortillas hold significance in the wedding tradition, as the tortilla is a symbol of unity.

== See also ==
- Chapati – A similar unleavened flatbread from South Asia
- Piki – A tortilla made of blue corn among the indigenous peoples of the Southwestern United States
- Pupusa – A thick, stuffed tortilla from Central America
