= Tortilla machine =

Machine for automated production of tortillas

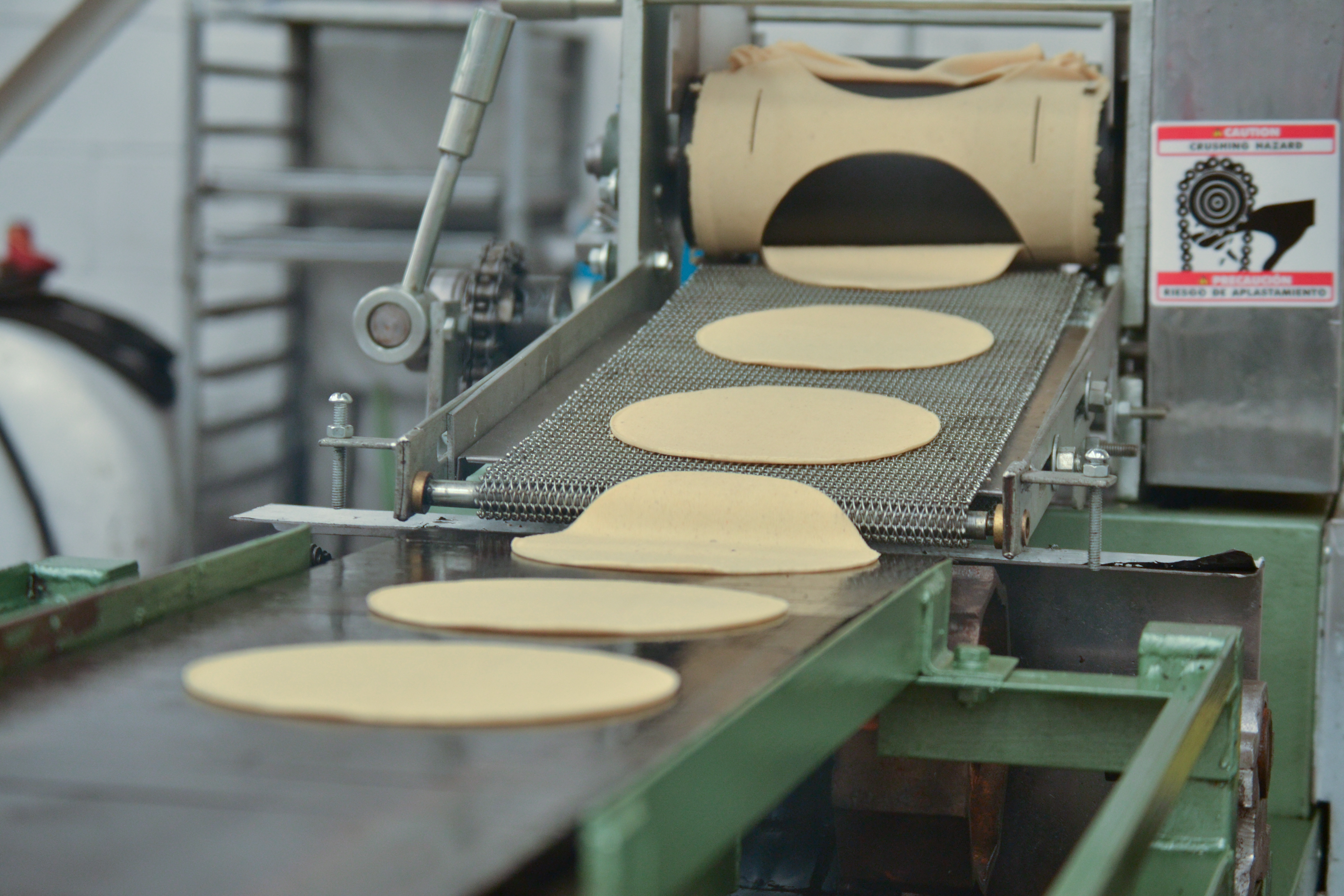
Tortilla machine

A tortilla machine (Spanish: máquina tortilladora), is a machine for processing corn dough (masa) into corn tortillas.

== History ==
The earliest tortilla machines were invented by Evarardo Rodríguez Arce and Luis Romero, and patented in 1904. Their machine formed dough balls into square tortillas, and was not commercially successful.

Mexican inventor Fausto Celorio Mendoza is credited with the invention of the first automatic tortilla machine. Celorio's 1947 machine pressed dough into round flats, then transported the flats to a series of three ovens for baking, and could produce one tortilla per minute. Celorio worked with engineer Alfonso Gándara to improve the machine's product and efficiency, so that by 1963 the machines were capable of producing 132 kg (291 lb) of tortillas per hour.
