= Corn tortilla =

Unleavened flatbread made from nixtamalized maize

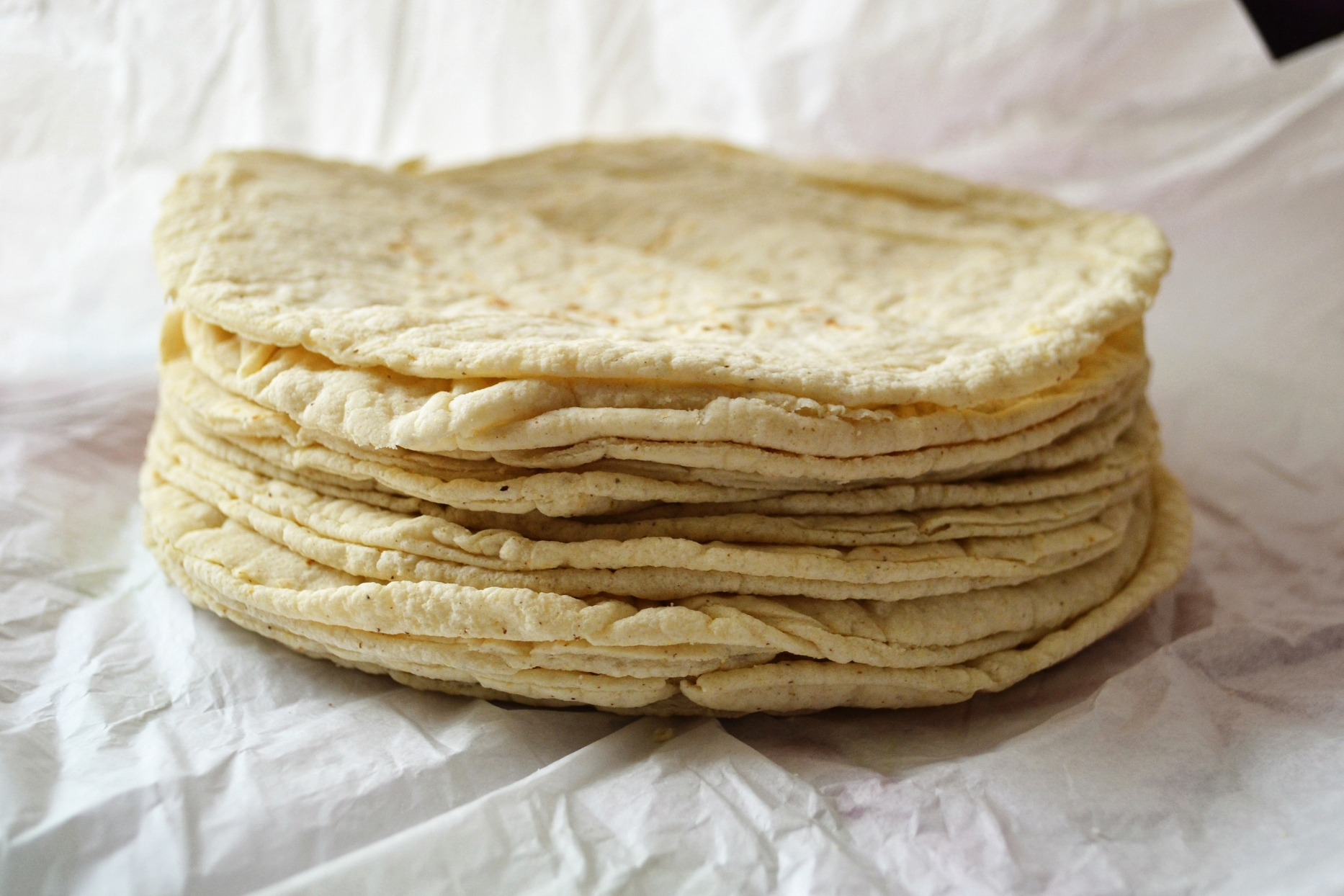
- A stack of fresh corn tortillas
- Alternative names: Tlaxcalli (Nahuatl)
- Type: Flatbread
- Course: Staple
- Place of origin: Mesoamerica
- Region or state: Mexico and Central America
- Created by: Pre-Columbian cultures
- Serving temperature: Warm
- Main ingredients: Maize flour (nixtamal)
- Variations: Gordita, pupusa, sope, tlacoyo, güirila

In Mexico and Central America, a corn tortilla or just tortilla (/tɔːrˈtiːə/, Spanish: [toɾˈtiʝa]) is a type of thin, unleavened flatbread, made from hominy, that is the whole kernels of maize treated with alkali to improve their nutrition in a process called nixtamalization. A simple dough made of ground hominy, salt and water is then formed into flat discs and cooked on a very hot surface, generally an iron griddle called a comal. A similar flatbread from South America, called an arepa (made with ground maize, not hominy, and typically much thicker than tortillas), also predates the arrival of Europeans to America.

The Aztecs and other Nahuatl-speakers call tortillas tlaxcalli ([t͡ɬaʃˈkalli]). They were called tortilla by the Spanish from its resemblance to traditional Spanish round, unleavened cakes and omelettes. The successful conquest of the Aztec empire by the Spanish and the subsequent colonial empire ruled from the former Aztec capital have ensured that this variation become the prototypical tortilla for much of the Spanish-speaking world.

Maize kernels naturally occur in many colors, depending on cultivar: from pale white, to yellow, to red and bluish purple. Likewise, corn meal and the tortillas made from it may be similarly colored. White and yellow tortillas are by far the most common, however. In Mexico, there are three colors of maize dough for making tortillas: white maize, yellow maize and blue maize (also referred to as black maize). Tortilla is a common food in Mexico, Guatemala, Belize, El Salvador, Honduras, Nicaragua and Costa Rica.

== Etymology ==
Tortilla, from Spanish torta, cake, plus the diminutive -illa, literally means "little cake". Nahuatl tlaxcalli is derived from the verb (i)xca "to bake" with the help of the prefix tla- and two common suffixes -l- and -li (<-tli), that is "something baked".

Tortilla in Iberian Spanish also means omelette. As such, this corn flour flatbread tortilla is not to be confused with the Spanish omelette or any other egg-based one.

== History ==
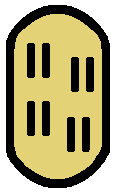
This drawing is a recreation of the corn tortilla glyph found in the Codex Mendoza

The corn tortilla was first developed in Mexico, during prehistoric times. It has since become a staple carbohydrate in North American and Mesoamerican cultures. It predates its derivative, the wheat flour tortilla (tortilla de harina or tortilla de trigo), in all such cultures. This is attributed to the fact that old world wheat was neither known nor grown in the Americas prior to European colonization.

In Aztec times two or three corn tortillas would be eaten with each meal, either plain or dipped in mole or a chili pepper and water sauce. Tortillas were also sold at Aztec marketplaces filled with turkey meat, turkey eggs, beans, honey, squash, prickly pears and various preparations of chili pepper.

Analogous staple carbohydrates in New World cultures, all made from hominy and serving a similar nutritional function, include the sope, the totopo, the gordita, the tlacoyo of Mexico, and the pupusa of Central America. The arepa of northern South America, though similar, is made with ground maize, not hominy, and does not offer the same nutrition profile as foods whose maize has been processed with alkali.

The tamal (or tamale) of Mexico is also made from nixtamal (the Nahuatl word for hominy is the source of the term 'nixtamalization'), but is much thicker and a dish unto itself, usually including other ingredients and flavors.

== Mexico ==
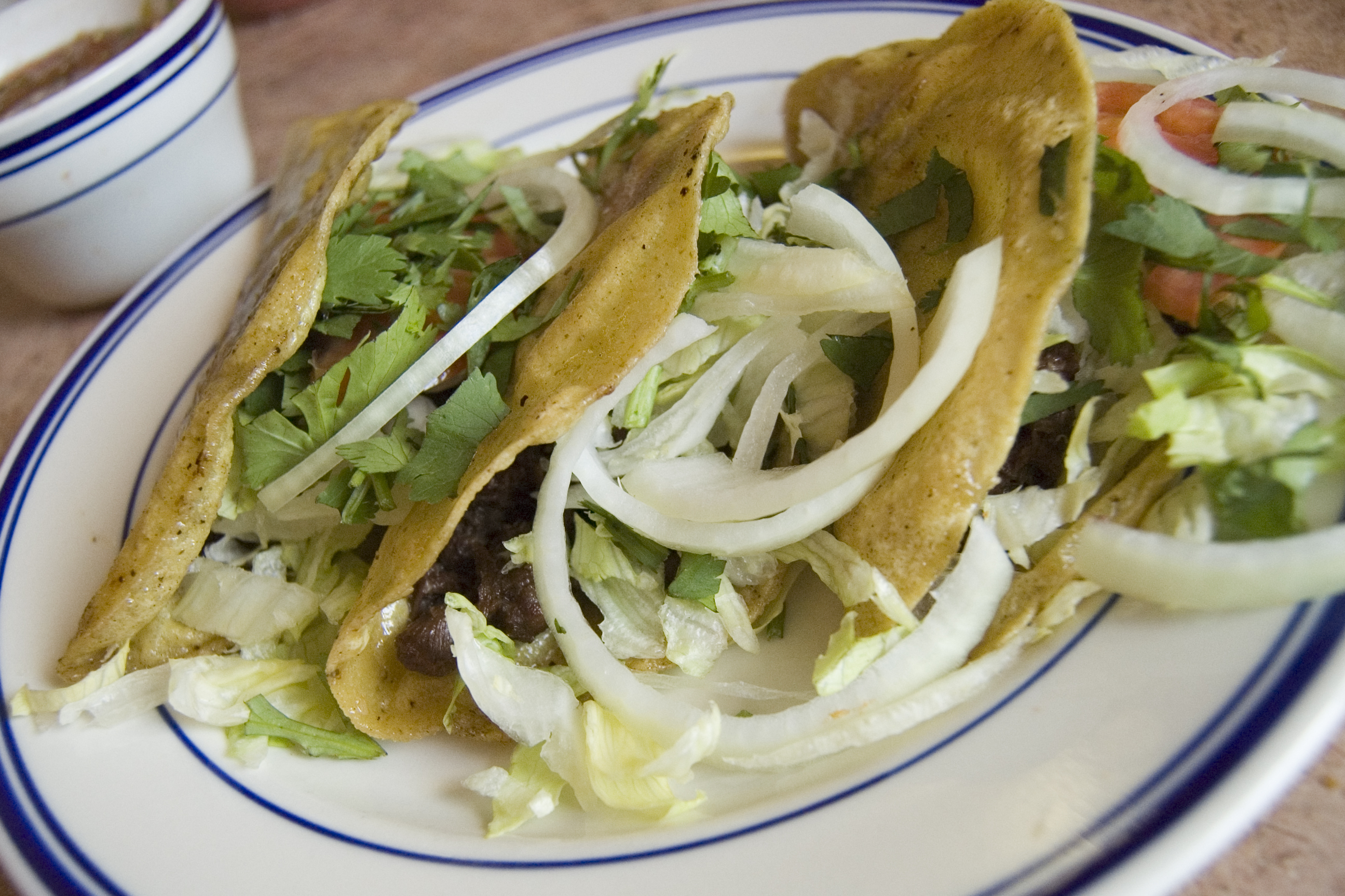
Tacos de barbacoa made with yellow corn tortillas at a Mexican restaurant in Chicago (2006)

Maize has been a staple food for thousands of years. It is the most-planted crop in the Mexican region. The country grows more than 42 distinct maize cultivars, each of which has several varieties. These varieties are estimated to number more than 3,000 by the International Center for the Improvement of Maize and Wheat (CIMMYT). The characteristics of each variety depend upon soil conditions, humidity, altitude, and its means of cultivation. Some of the earliest evidence of maize cultivation suggests that its original domestication was in fact simultaneous in several places.

Maize is the basis of most Mexican cuisine, with some exception in the culinary traditions of northern Mexico, where wheat is taking the place of maize as the cereal base. In Mexico, the primary use of maize is the tortilla, but it is also a principal ingredient in other foods including tamales and atole. The maize used for tortillas can be ripe and dry, but it is also consumed fresh and mature (maize), or soft and fresh (xilote).

Tortillas are consumed daily. Factory-made tortillas are widely sold, although they can easily be made at home. Tortilla production starts in the early morning as lunch is the main meal of the day for most people. In Mexico, lunch is eaten between 1:30 p.m. and 3:30 p.m. (1330 to 1530). Some supermarkets and grocery stores sell freshly made tortillas throughout the day.

Mexican and, more generally, Latin American dishes made with maize tortillas include:

- Chalupas
- Chilaquiles
- Enchiladas
- Enfrijoladas
- Entomatadas
- Gorditas
- Pan de cazón
- Pastel azteca
- Peneques
- Quesadillas
- Sincronizadas
- Sopes
- Tacos
- Tacos dorados
- Tlayudas
- Totopos – Tortilla chips
- Tortilla soup
- Tostadas

== Preparation ==
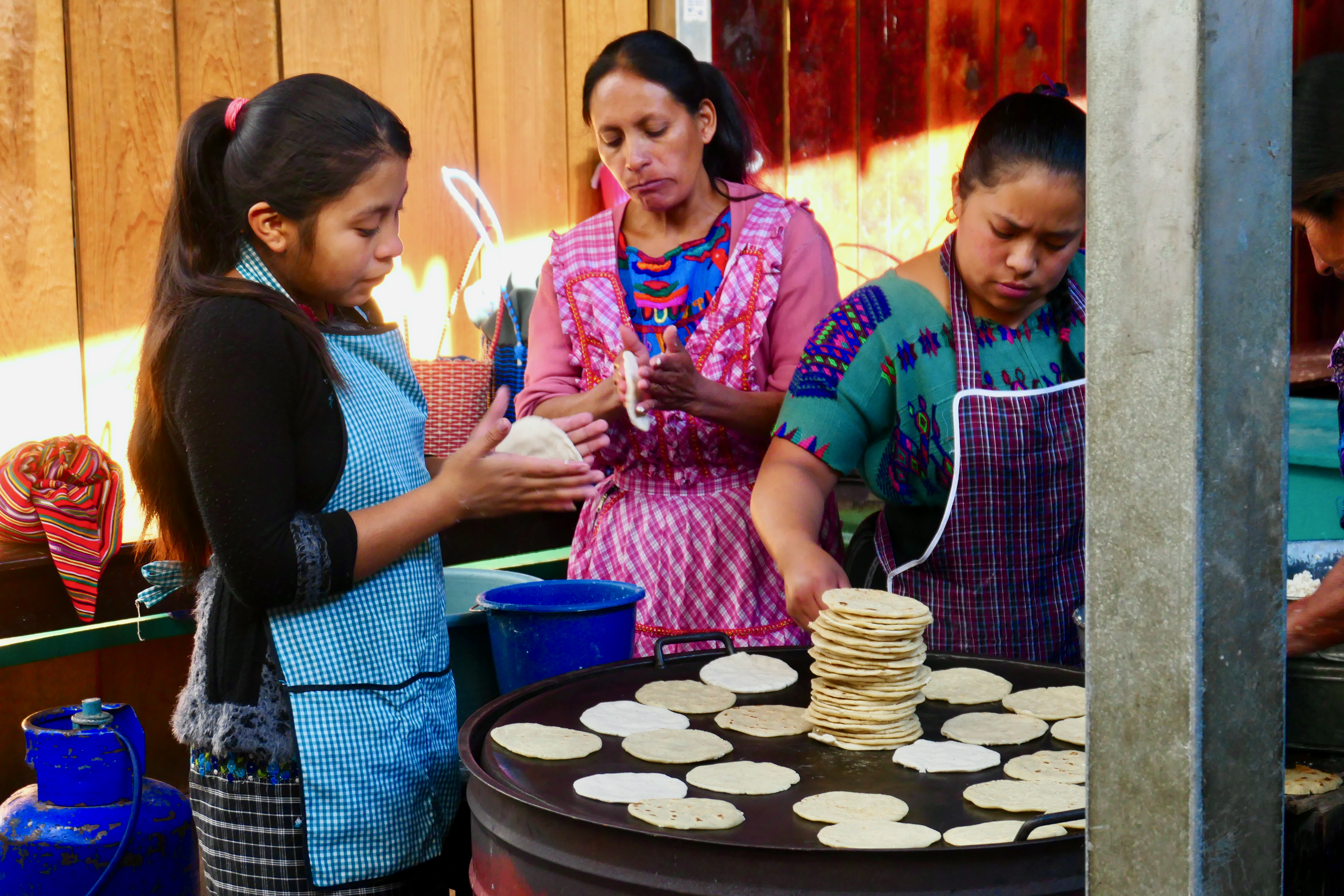
Preparation of tortillas in Chichicastenango, Guatemala.

A tortilla is made by curing maize in limewater in the nixtamalization process, which causes the skin of the corn kernels to peel off (the waste material is typically fed to poultry), then grinding and cooking it, kneading it into a dough called masa nixtamalera, pressing it flat into thin patties using a rolling pin, tortilla press or by hand, and cooking it on a very hot comal (originally a flat terra cotta griddle, now usually made of light sheet-metal instead). The process, called nixtamalization, was developed indigenously by pre-Columbian cultures and predates European contact by many centuries, if not millennia. Soaking the maize in limewater is important because it makes available the B vitamin niacin and the amino acid tryptophan. When maize was brought to Europe, Africa and Asia from the New World, this crucial step was often omitted. Those whose diet consisted mostly of corn meal often became sick — because of the lack of niacin and tryptophan — with the deficiency disease pellagra, which was common in Spain, Northern Italy, and the southern United States.

In Mexico, particularly in the towns and cities, corn tortillas are often made nowadays by machine and are very thin and uniform, but in many places in the country, they are still made by hand, even when the nixtamal is ground into masa by machine. Corn tortillas are customarily served and eaten warm; when cool, they often become rubbery or grainy as the cooked starches stale. The largest tortilla producer in the world is the Mexican company Gruma, headquartered in Monterrey.

Traditionally throughout Mesoamerica from pre-Hispanic times into the mid-20th century, the masa was prepared by women using a mano (a cylinder-shaped stone like a rolling pin) and metate (a stone base with a slightly concave top for holding the corn). This method is still used in some places in Mexico and Central America.

The wheat flour tortilla was an innovation after wheat was brought to the New World from Spain while this region was the colony of New Spain. It is made with an unleavened, water-based dough, pressed and cooked like corn tortillas. These tortillas are very similar to the unleavened bread popular in Arab, eastern Mediterranean and southern Asian countries, though thinner and smaller in diameter. In China the laobing (烙餅), a thick circular "pancake", is similar to the tortilla. The Indian roti, which is made essentially from wheat flour, is another example.

Tortillas vary in size from about 6 to over 30 cm (2.4 to over 12 in), depending on the region of the country and the dish for which it is intended. Among tortilla variants (without being, strictly speaking, tortillas) there are pupusas, pishtones, gorditas, sopes, and tlacoyos. They are smaller, thicker versions to which beans, chicharrón, nopales or other ingredients have been added. They are customarily cooked on a greased pan.

In Nicaragua, a type of tortillas called güirilas are also consumed. They are made from young white corn. Güirilas are thick, sweet and filling. They are eaten alone, with cuajada and cream, meat, or accompanying a dish. In Argentina, Bolivia and southern Chile, the size of the tortillas is smaller. They are generally saltier, made from wheat or corn flour, and roasted in the ashes of a traditional adobe oven. This kind of tortilla is called sopaipilla (not to be confused with a puffy frybread of the same name common in the United States). In Chile and Argentina, it may also be sweetened after being cooked by boiling in sugar water.

In commercial production and even in some larger restaurants, automatic machines make tortillas from dough. A tortilla seller is, in Nahuatl languages: tlaxcalnamacac [t͡ɬaʃkalnaˈmakak] or Spanish: tortillero [toɾtiˈʝeɾo].

Tortillas, ready-to-bake or -fry, corn
Nutritional value per 100 g (3.5 oz)
- Energy: 912 kJ (218 kcal)
- Carbohydrates: 44.6 g
- Sugars: 0.9 g
- Dietary fiber: 6.3 g
- Fat: 2.8 g
- Protein: 5.7 g
Vitamins and minerals
Vitamins	Quantity %DV^{†}
Thiamine (B1)	8% 0.09 mg
Riboflavin (B2)	5% 0.06 mg
Niacin (B3)	9% 1.5 mg
Pantothenic acid (B5)	2% 0.11 mg
Vitamin B6	13% 0.22 mg
Folate (B9)	1% 5 μg
Choline	2% 13.3 mg
Vitamin C	0% 0 mg
Vitamin E	2% 0.3 mg
Minerals	Quantity %DV^{†}
Calcium	6% 81 mg
Copper	17% 0.15 mg
Iron	7% 1.2 mg
Magnesium	17% 72 mg
Manganese	14% 0.33 mg
Phosphorus	25% 314 mg
Potassium	6% 186 mg
Sodium	2% 45 mg
Zinc	12% 1.3 mg
- Other constituents: Quantity
- Water: 45.9 g
- Link to USDA Database entry
- ^{†}Percentages estimated using US recommendations for adults, except for potassium, which is estimated based on expert recommendation from the National Academies.

== Nutrition ==
An uncooked corn tortilla made with nixtamalized corn at 46% hydration and depending on corn variety used and variations, consists of 45% carbohydrates, 3% fat, and 6% protein (table). In a 100 gram reference amount, a raw corn tortilla supplies 218 calories and is a rich source (20% or higher of the Daily Value, DV) of phosphorus (45% DV) and magnesium (20% DV). It is a moderate source (10-19% DV) of vitamin B6, niacin, manganese, and zinc (table).

== Uses ==
Corn tortillas are the basis of many traditional Mexican dishes, such as tacos, tostadas, enchiladas, flautas, quesadillas, chilaquiles, and tortilla soup. Warmed corn tortillas are also often served as an accompaniment to stews, soups, grilled meats and other dishes, as bread might be served in other cuisines. By contrast, wheat flour tortillas are often used for burritos and quesadillas, particularly in the United States. Corn tortillas may also be deep fried to make crisp tortilla chips. These are often salted, and can be eaten alone or accompanied with various salsas and dips such as guacamole. Tortilla chips are a key ingredient in nachos.

== Gallery ==
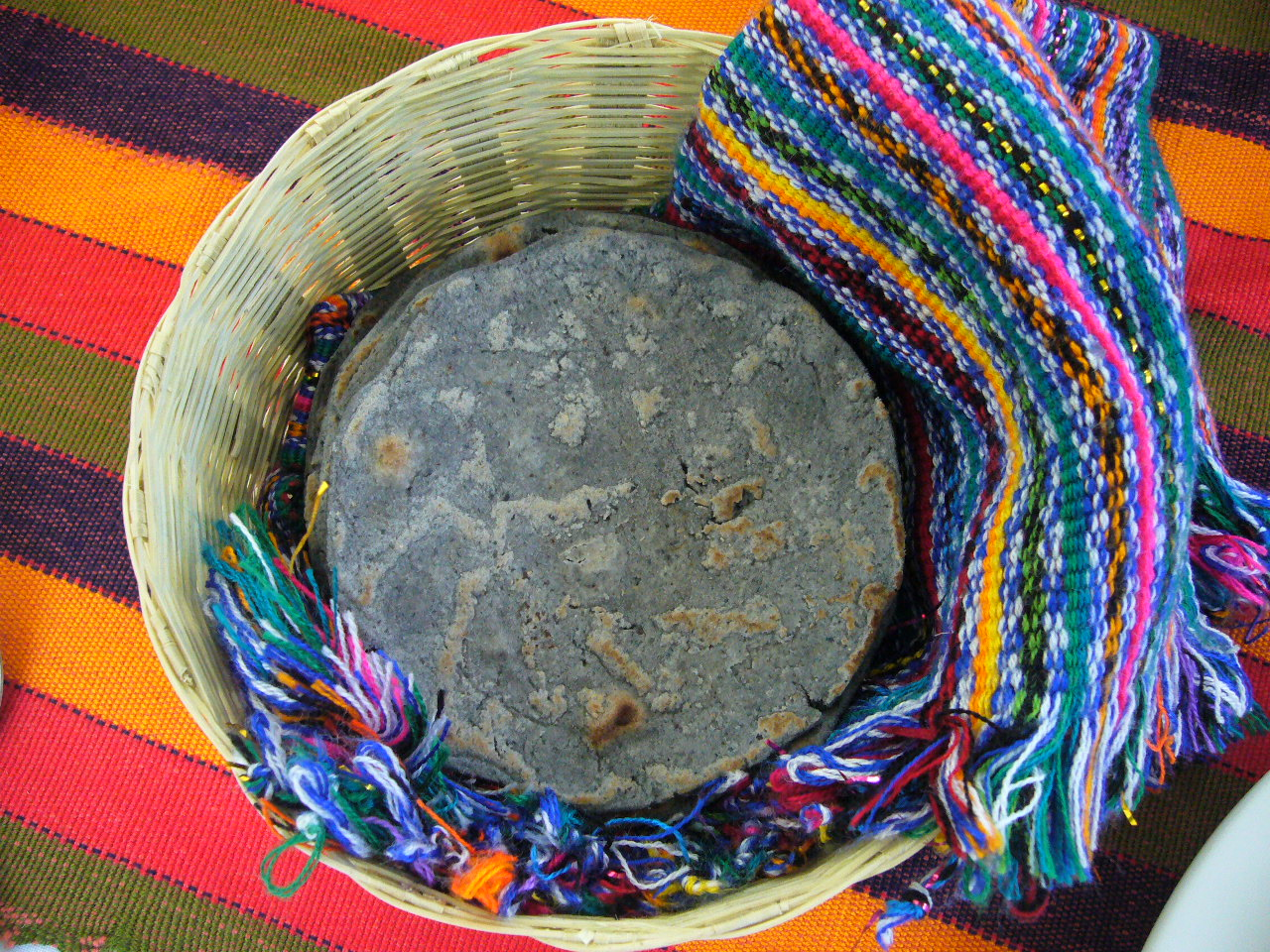
Tortillas of blue corn

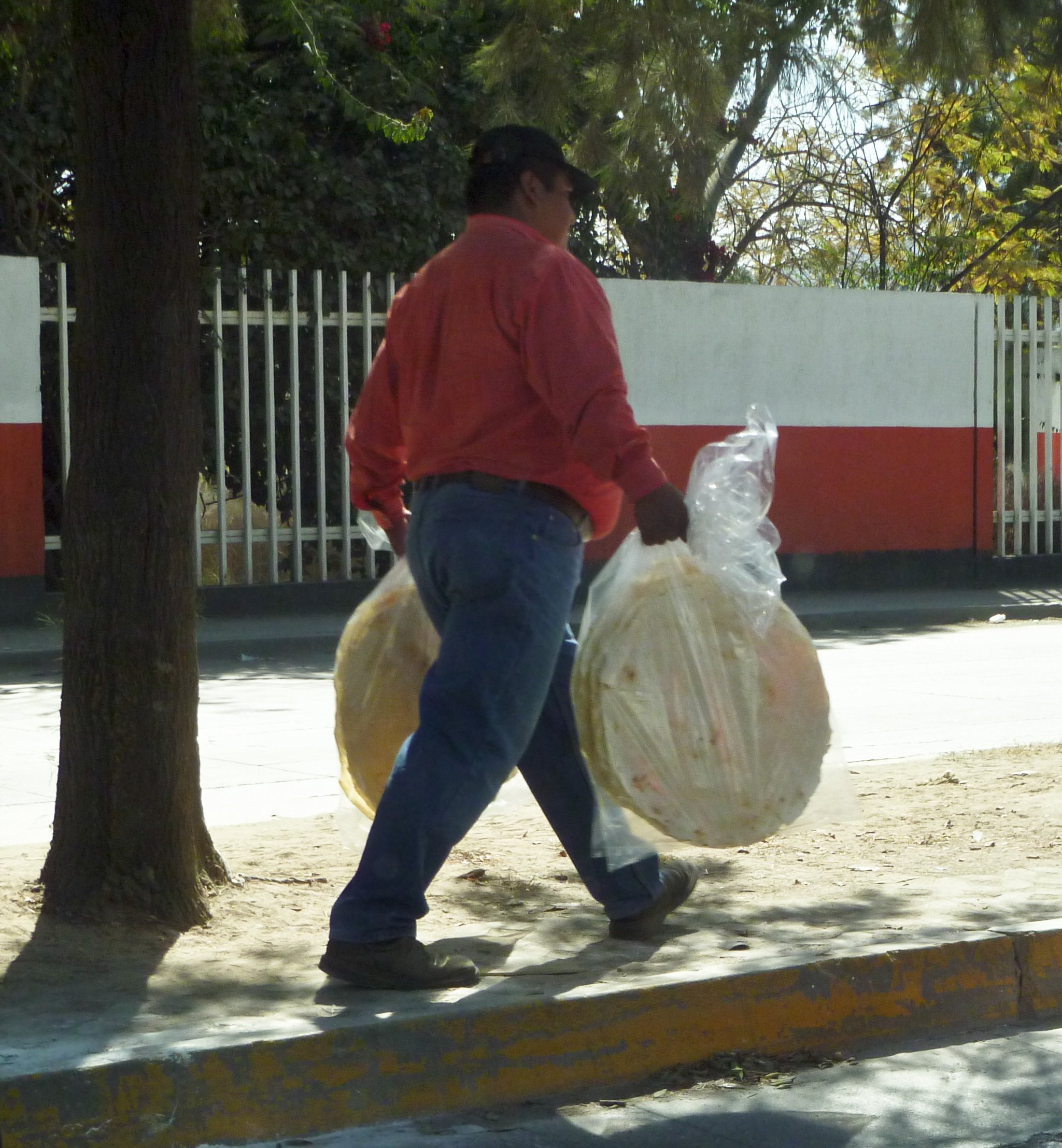
Large toasted tortillas are used for making tlayudas being sold by a street vendor in Oaxaca

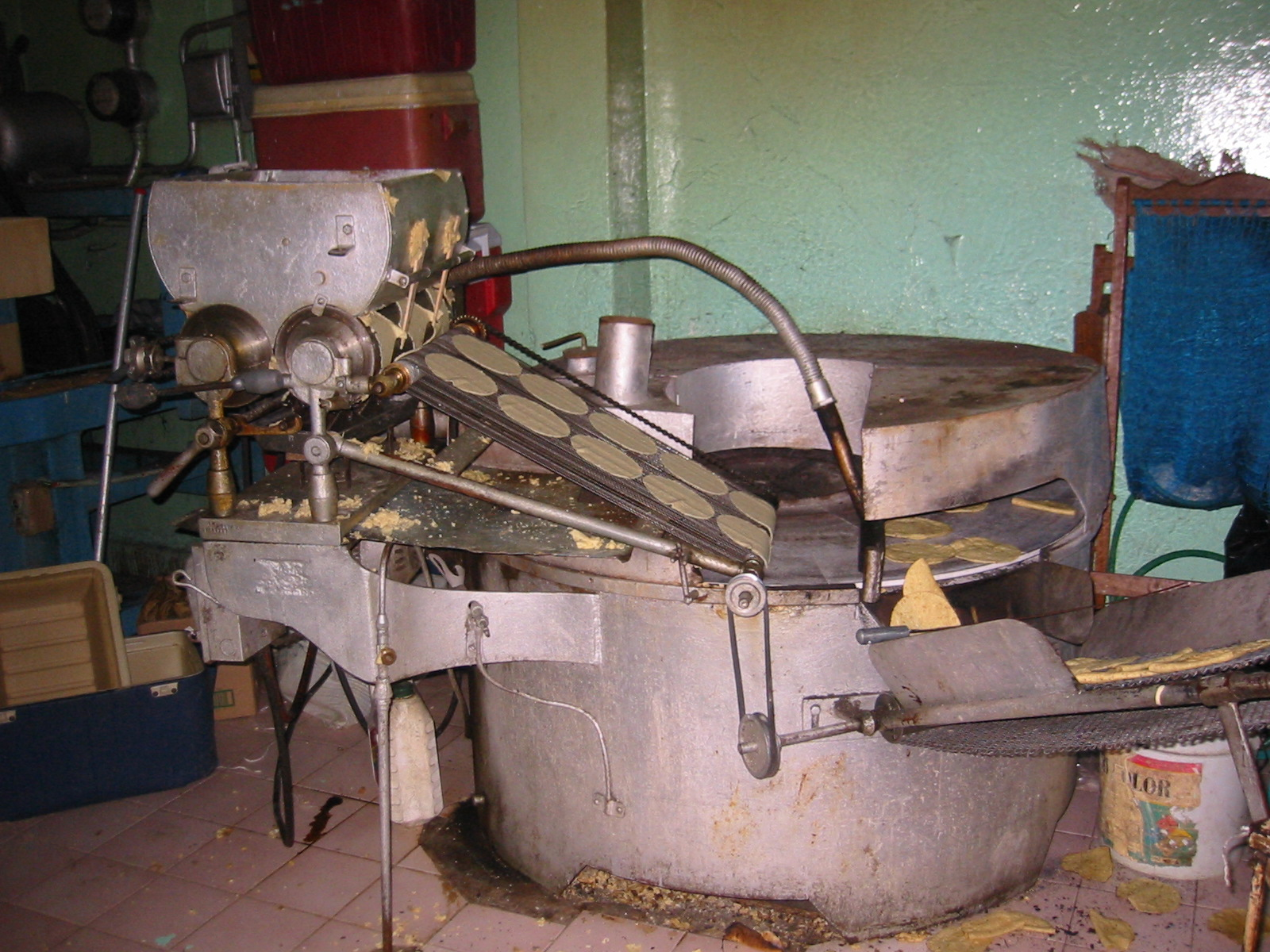
Automatic tortilla machine (explanation)

Machine making corn tortillas in Mexico City

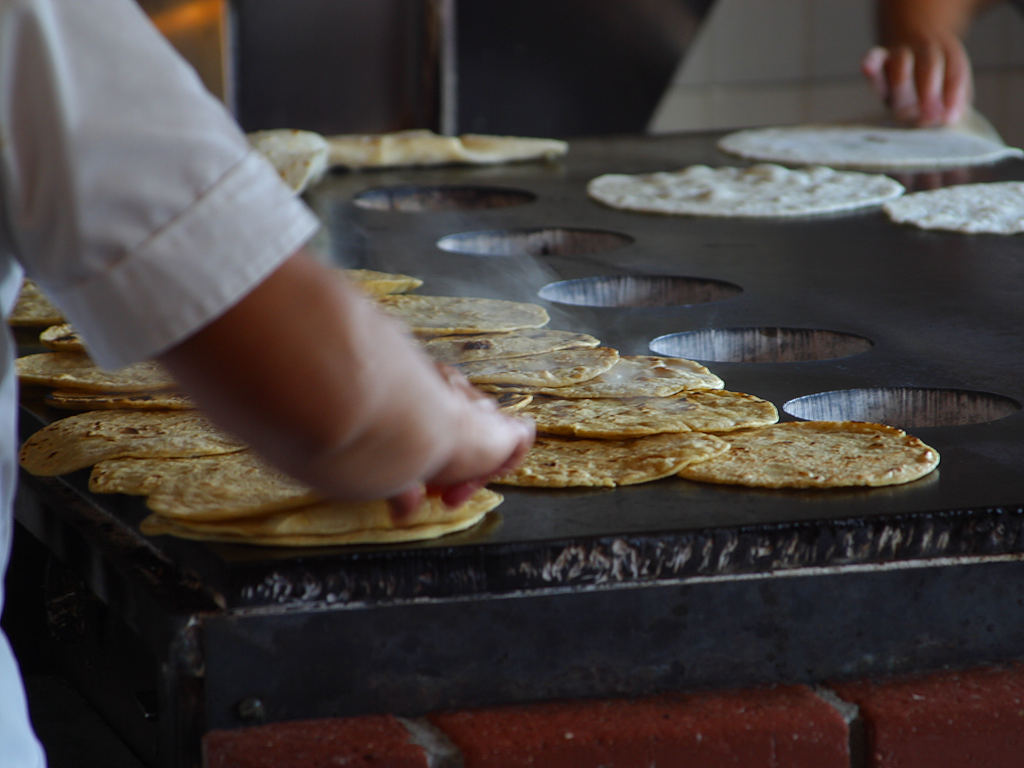
Tortillas being made in Old Town San Diego

== See also ==
- Blintz
- Burrito
- Chimichanga
- Crêpe
- Honduran cuisine
- List of maize dishes
- List of tortilla-based dishes
- Mexican cuisine
  - Gordita
  - Taco
- Pancake
- Pita
- Roti
- Salvadoran cuisine
- Talo, the Basque version of corn tortillas.
- Tortilla art
- Tortilla chip
- Tortilla de patatas, a potato omelet.
- Wheat tortilla
- Xarém
