= Rocket Taco =

Mexican restaurant chain in the U.S. state of Washington

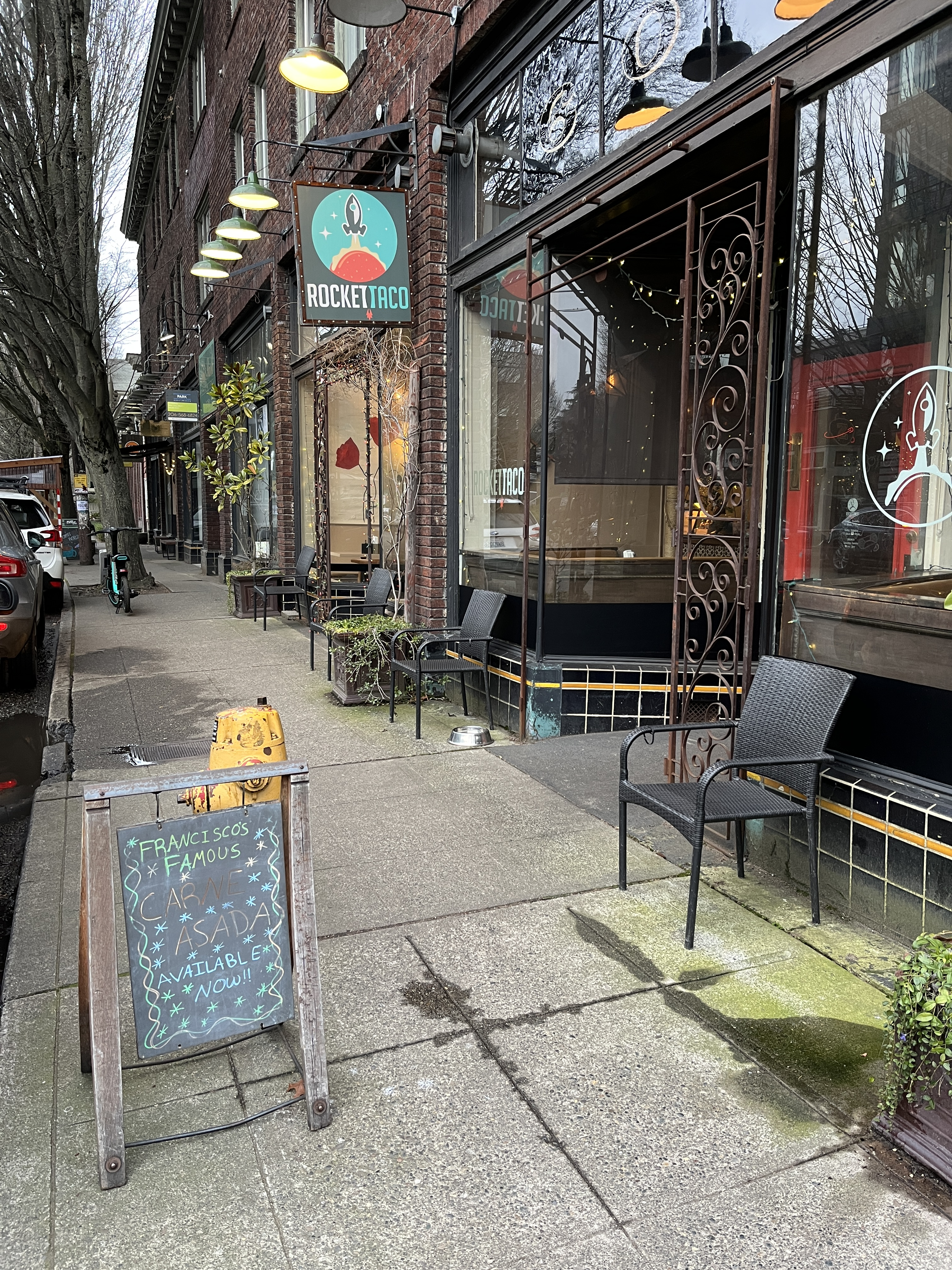
- Exterior of the restaurant on Seattle's Capitol Hill, 2023
- Interactive map of Rocket Taco

Restaurant information
- Food type: Mexican
- Location: Washington, United States
- Coordinates: 48.0093°N 122.5288°W

Rocket Taco is a small chain of Mexican restaurants in the U.S. state of Washington. The business was established on Whidbey Island, and began operating an outpost on Seattle's Capitol Hill in 2018.

== Description ==
The Mexican restaurant chain Rocket Taco operates on East Main Street on Whidbey Island, and on 19th Avenue East on Seattle's Capitol Hill. The Freeland location has a lawn and outdoor seating on a patio with heaters.

The business serves tacos two ways: classic (topped with cilantro and onion) or deluxe, which includes additional toppings. Other taco ingredients include guajillo-spiced beef, braised pork, ancho-seasoned chicken, chorizo, coconut crema, cod, lentil, pickled onions, pineapple salsa, potato, and quinoa. The menu also includes beans, burritos, pozole, guacamole, rice bowls, salads, quesadillas, queso fundido, and tortilla soup; drink options include beer, horchata, Jarritos sodas, margaritas, micheladas, and wine. The dessert menu includes churros, as well as chocolate or lime pie. The family-friendly restaurant has a kids' menu. Tortillas (made of corn and flour) are handmade daily.

== History ==
Owners Steve and Jill Rosen opened the original restaurant in Freeland in April 2017. The Capitol Hill location opened on February 2, 2018, in the space that previously housed Kingfish Cafe, Ernest Loves Agnes, and Contadino. The business plans to relocate to the 19th & Mercer apartment building.

== See also ==
- List of Mexican restaurants
- List of restaurant chains in the United States
