= Gordita =

Mexican dish of masa stuffed with cheese, meat, or other fillings

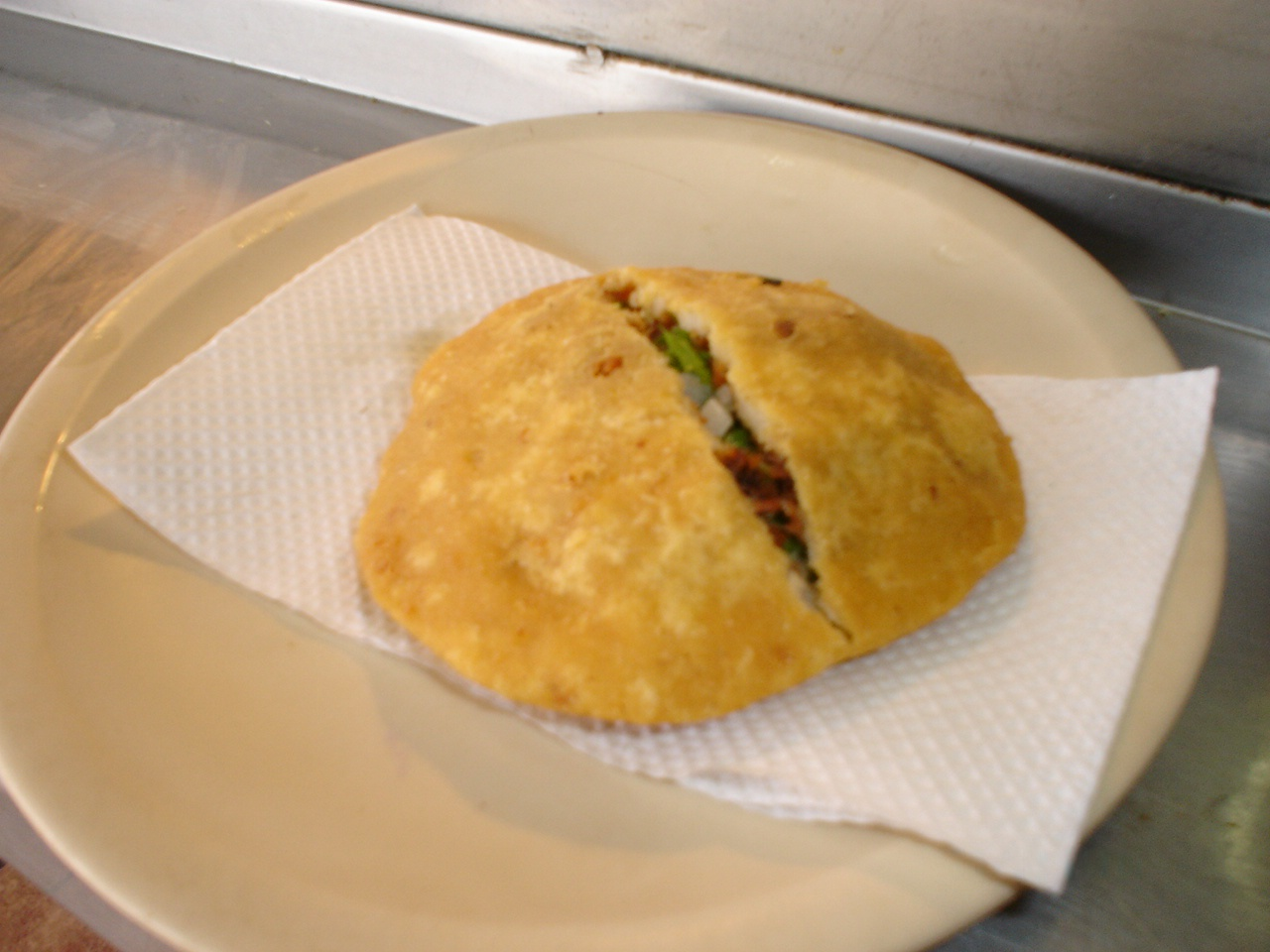
- Course: Breakfast, lunch, dinner
- Place of origin: Mexico
- Associated cuisine: Mexican
- Serving temperature: Hot, room temperature
- Main ingredients: Corn tortillas, guisados (meat stew), salsa

A gordita (Spanish pronunciation: [ɡoɾˈðita]; lit. 'chubby') in Mexican cuisine is a dish made with masa and stuffed with cheese, meat, or other fillings. It is similar to the Colombian and Venezuelan arepa. Two main variations of this dish exist, one of which is typically fried in a deep, wok-shaped comal, consumed mostly in central and southern Mexico, and another one baked on a regular comal. The most common and representative variation of this dish is the gordita de chicharrón, filled with chicharron (a spiced stew of pork rind), which is widely consumed throughout Mexico. Gorditas are often eaten as a lunch dish and accompanied by several types of sauce.

== Variations ==
A gordita is typically prepared as a thick tortilla. The dough is most commonly made of nixtamalized corn flour, as also used for tortillas, but can also be of wheat flour, particularly in northern Mexico close to the United States border. An old variant of corn gorditas uses masa quebrada (broken dough), where the cornmeal is coarsely ground, leaving bits of broken grain.

In the deep-fried version, once the masa has been prepared, it is divided into small portions, each filled with meat and shaped like an oblong disc. The pastry is immersed in hot oil until golden and crispy on the outside. After cooking, the gordita is allowed to stand to drain excess oil, and then a small slit is cut into one side to allow vapor and excessive heat to escape before lime juice and salsa are poured inside, which gives the gordita its characteristic flavor. In some regions of Mexico, the slit is also used to stuff it with additional ingredients, mostly dressings such as fresh cheese, nopal salad, tomatoes, guacamole, potatoes, beans or rajas (sautéed strips of chile). By tradition, gorditas are filled with chicharron, but some local variations substitute it with chicken stew, shredded beef, carne al pastor, eggs with chorizo, carnitas, or picadillo.

The baked version is prepared almost identically to the preparation of a common tortilla, except it is thicker. When the masa is prepared, chicharrón is mixed directly in the dough, instead of being added later. The dough is shaped like a flat circle, then placed in a comal until cooked, in most cases without adding additional oil. When slit and filled, this gordita looks like a sandwich made with tortillas instead of bread. This variation is known as gordita de migas.

== Regional variations ==
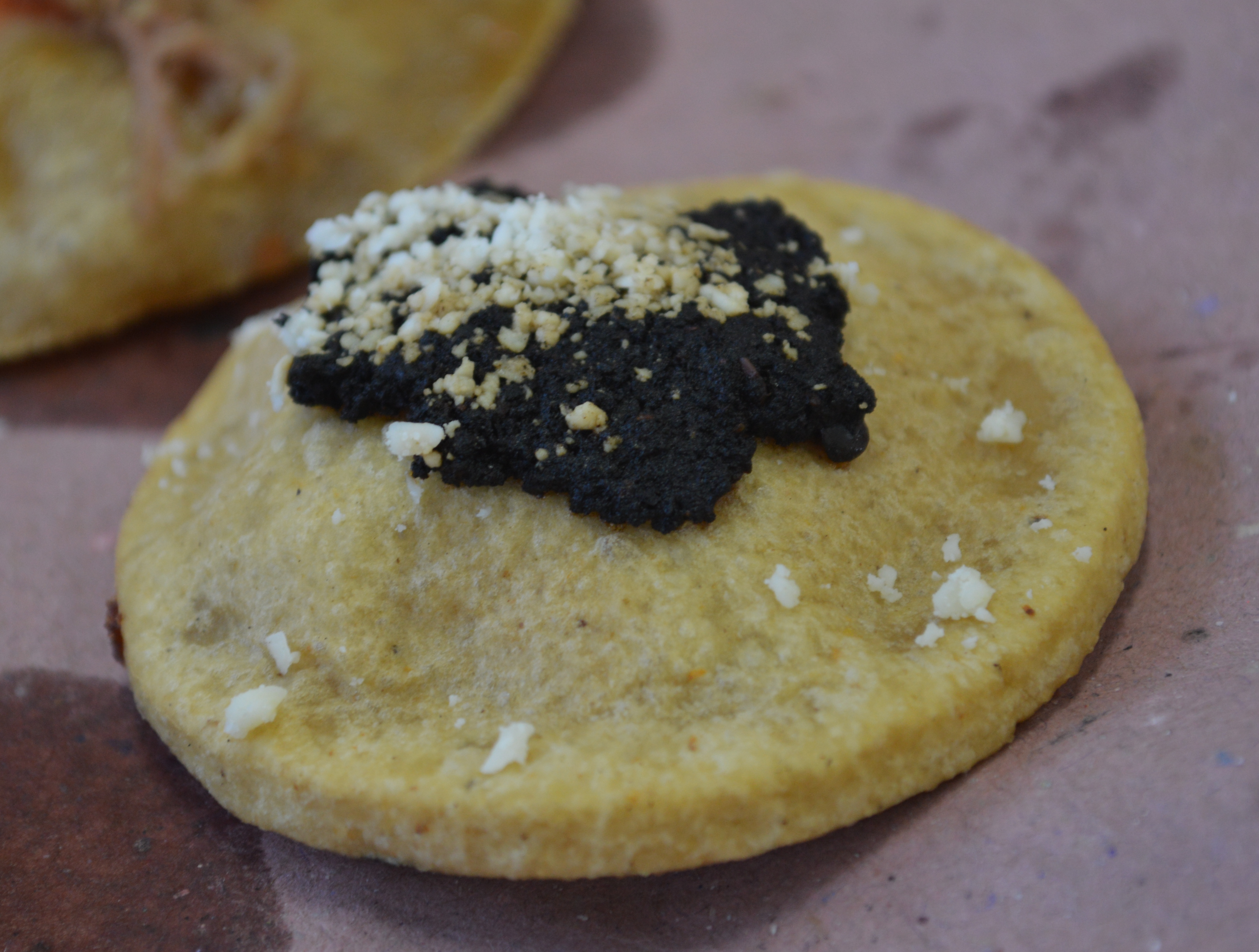
A Veracruz-style gordita, typical of the east coast of Mexico

In central Mexico, gorditas commonly range from being relatively small, but bulky (about the size of a child's fist), to about the diameter of a "regular" tortilla. In northern Mexico, they tend to be larger and flatter.

In most cases gorditas are pan-fried with vegetable oil in a deep comal, but they can also be deep-fried, making the outside crispier.

In Durango and other states of Northern Mexico, gorditas are commonly made from wheat flour and look like small pita bread. The masa is identical to that of a wheat-flour tortilla. It is cooked on a comal with a hot piece of metal placed on top that resembles a clothes iron. The gordita fills with steam, and a small slit is cut into one side where it can be filled with guisados.

== Similar dishes ==
- The Salvadoran pupusa is similar to a gordita, except completely sealed and typically served with curtido, a lightly pickled cabbage relish.
- In Venezuela and Colombia, an arepa (a type of cornbread) is often served stuffed with various ingredients. It is prepared in a similar way as a Mexican gordita, except the final dish is smaller and slimmer.
- In China, the roujiamo is a similar dish that means "meat sandwiched in bread"; it is a street food originating from the cuisine of Shaanxi Province and widely consumed all over China.

== Other gorditas ==
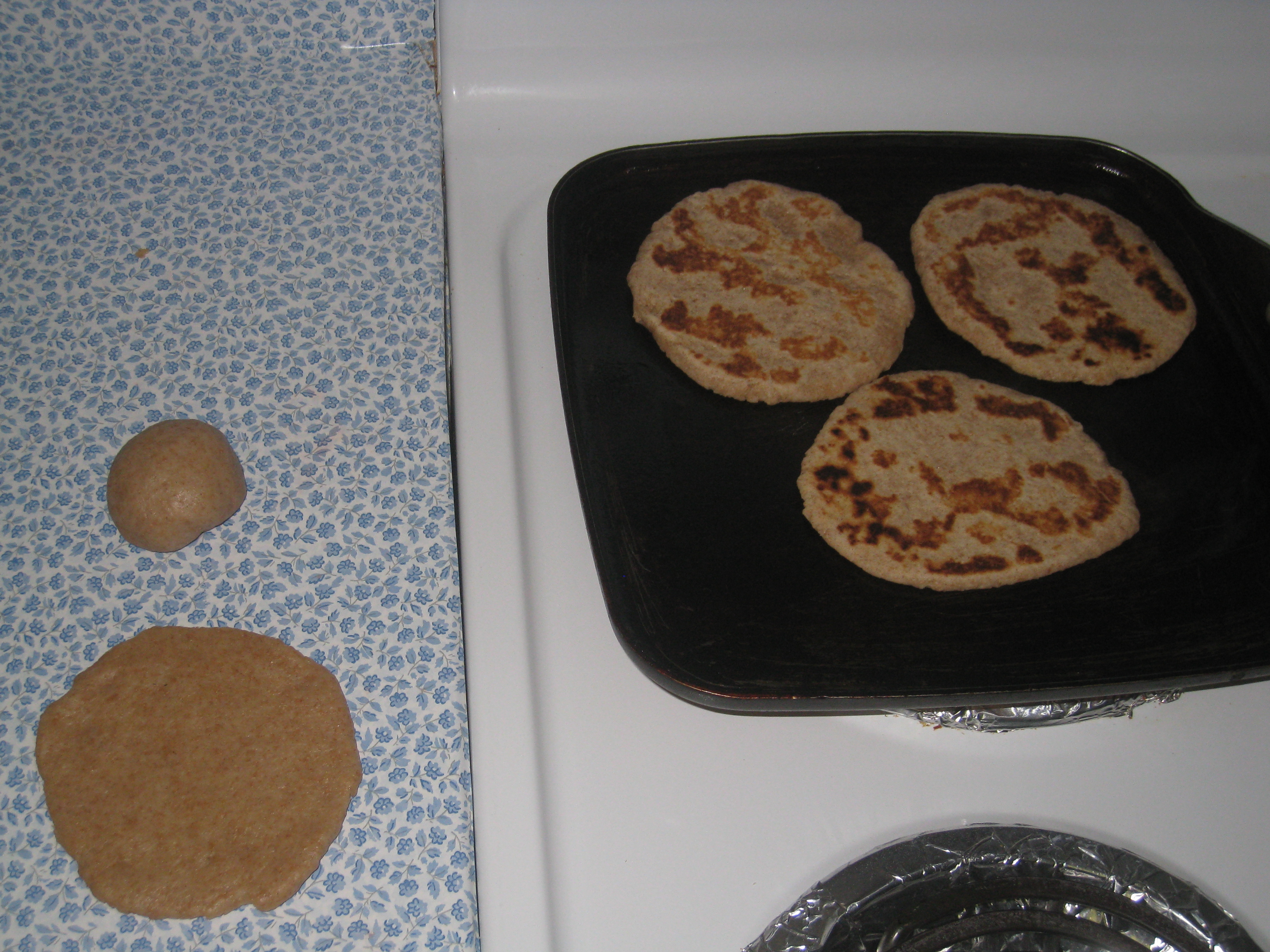
Gorditas de azúcar (sugar gorditas)

=== Taco Bell ===
The fast-food restaurant chain Taco Bell offers a wheat flour gordita that has limited similarity to gorditas as served in Mexico, and is more akin to a pita bread taco.

=== Sweet ===
In eastern and central Mexico, gorditas de nata (cream gorditas) are consumed often as a breakfast dish or snack. It is a sweet cake similar to a tiny but extremely thick pancake made with milk cream or clotted cream, called nata in Mexico, cinnamon, sugar, and white wheat flour. They are named gordita, too, due to their appearance, similar to the original fried gordita, but their taste is sweet, not salty. Other than their appearance, this snack is not related to the original one.

The same flour preparation used to prepare gorditas de nata is also used to cook a flat cookie variation, which by extension is also called gordita, but in contrast, it is thin and crispy, not thick. To differentiate them, these flat cookies are called gorditas de azúcar (sugar gorditas).

== See also ==
- Antojito – Mexican street food
- Arepa – South American corn flatbread
- Pupusa – Central American dish
- List of Mexican dishes
- List of stuffed dishes – Foods prepared with fillings and stuffings
