= Cazuelita =

Mexican dish

Cazuelita is a small casserole made of a mixture of corn dough (same paste used for corn tortilla) and mashed potatoes that is used as a side dish or as an appetizer of Mexican cuisine. These small casseroles are molded by hand and then fried in oil or lard. They have enough space to contain different types of fillings like salsas, refried beans or stews.
