= Achira =

Achira may refer to:

- Canna indica, also called achira and Canna edulis
- Achira (biscuit), a traditional snack in Colombia
- Achyra, a village in western Greece
- Achira, an antagonist from the animated series Extreme Ghostbusters
