= Achira (biscuit) =

Colombian biscuits

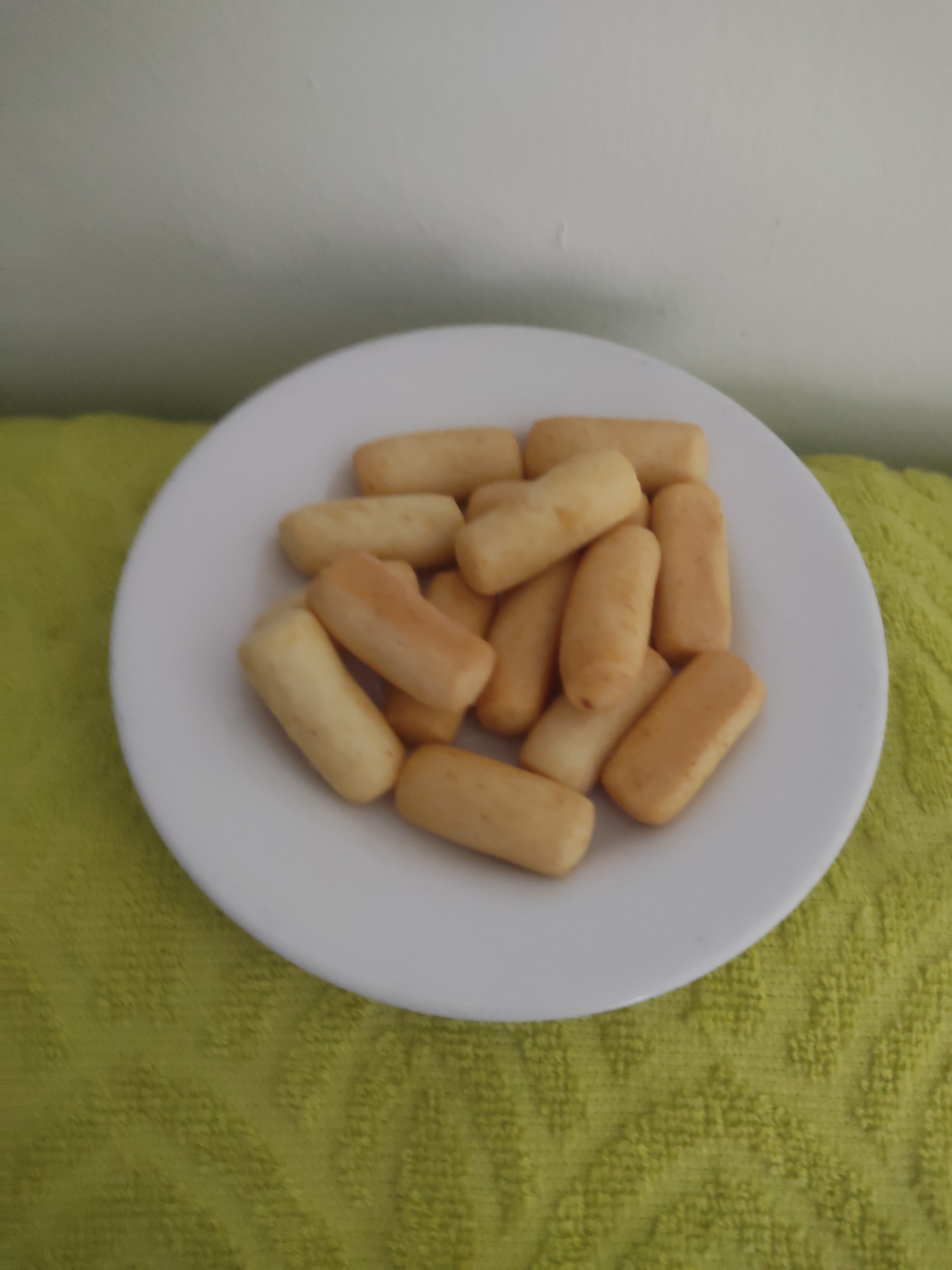
- Achiras from Huila
- Alternative names: Achira crackers
- Type: Cracker
- Place of origin: Colombia
- Region or state: Huila and Tolima.
- Main ingredients: Achira flour, cuajada, butter, egg, sugar and salt.
- Other information: Colombian cuisine

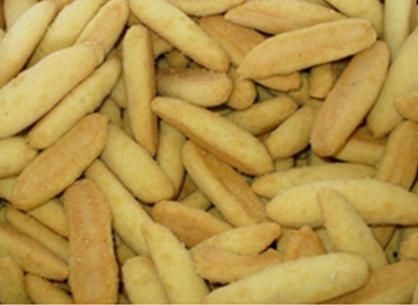
Achira crackers are a traditional snack

Achiras or achira crackers are traditional snacks from Huila, and their consumption has diversified in the rest of Colombia. They are made from achira flour (obtained in Colombia) instead of wheat flour.

Widely recognized in Huila as the achiras from Huila or Achira crackers, they provide minerals such as calcium, iron, phosphorus, sodium and high protein content and are gluten-free. Its shape is elongated and cylindrical with a golden yellow colour, typical of good cooking. It melts slightly in your mouth with a crispy, soft and gritty texture, with a taste of milk.The achira is also known as saga or chisgua in Colombia.

The rhizomes of the Canna indica plant were cooked or roasted, and consumed as food by the Chibchas in Colombia, but it is believed that their use spread throughout the Andes due to trade with other indigenous communities.

== Preparation ==
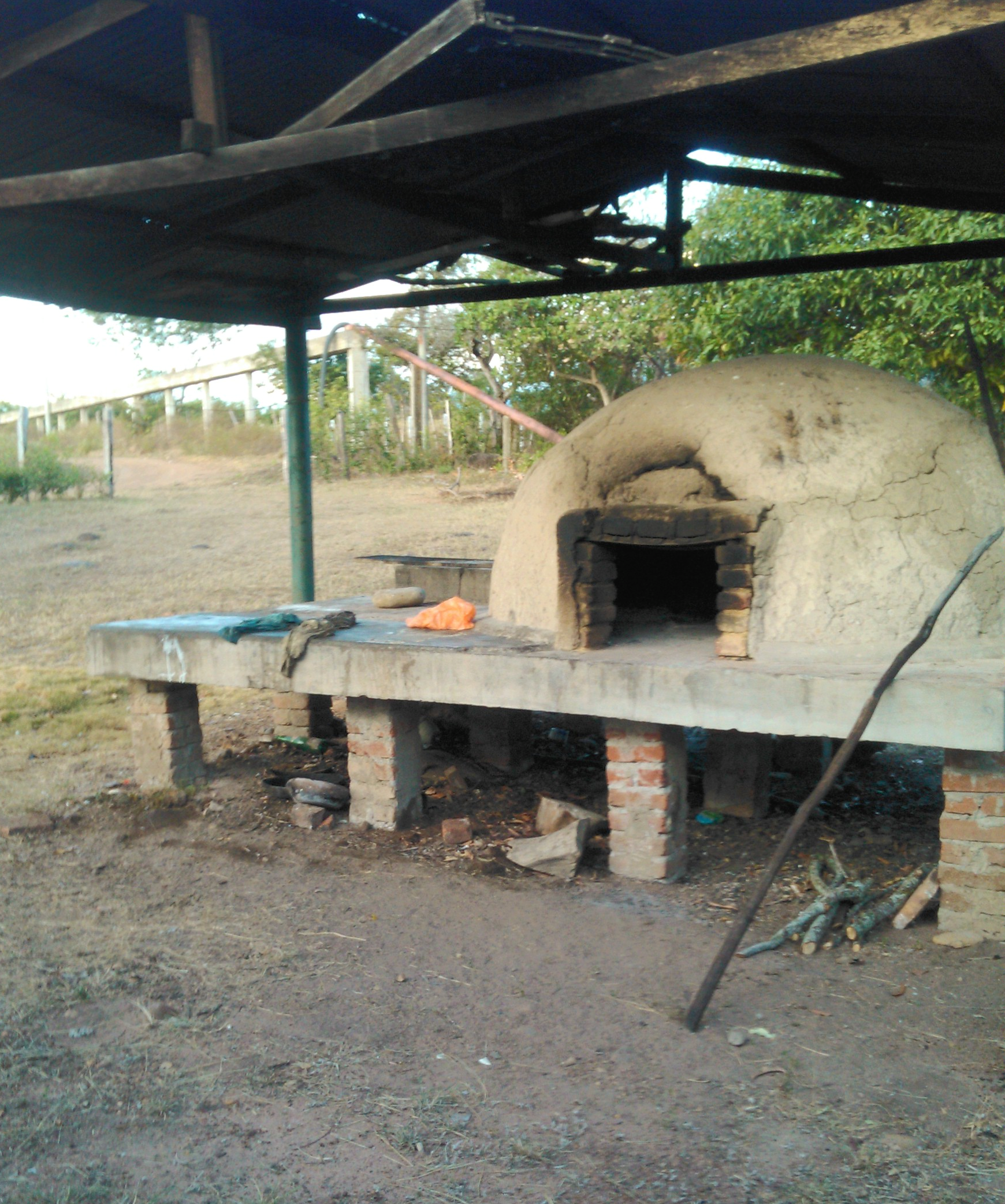
Clay oven used to cook achira crackers

Huila is the biggest producer of achira flour cake in the world. Achira crackers are still prepared to a traditional recipe and cooked in clay ovens. Achira flour, the main ingredient, is extracted from the achira plant, whose origin is South American.

== Characteristics and qualities ==
- External appearance: Oval shape, with variable dimensions, between 3 and 8 centimetres long and a diameter between 1 and 2 centimetres.
- Surface: Sandy.
- Colour: Golden yellow, without artificial colouring.
- Aroma: With a mild dairy aroma
- Texture: Crunchy (light toasted), gritty and melts gently on the palate.
- Weight: It ranges between 2.6 a. 8 grams according to the portion of dough put on the tray
- Internal appearance: Sandy compact, if possible without voids between its walls.

== Reputation ==
The achira cracker is a fundamental part of the region's traditional culture, and due to its great recognition as a typical product of the department of Huila and its high local consumption, it has managed to diversify nationally and internationally.

Press articles highlight the presence of the achira cracker in the national and international market. For example, the article "The Achira cracker opens export markets" mentions that one of the delicacies of the gastronomic department of Huila, the traditional achira cracker, began to open markets in the United States and Spain and recently was second in a large project in Japan. The article highlights that the traditional achira cracker is made by hand and that last year it managed to sell $114,000 abroad."
