= Sincronizada =

Mexican flour tortilla-based sandwich

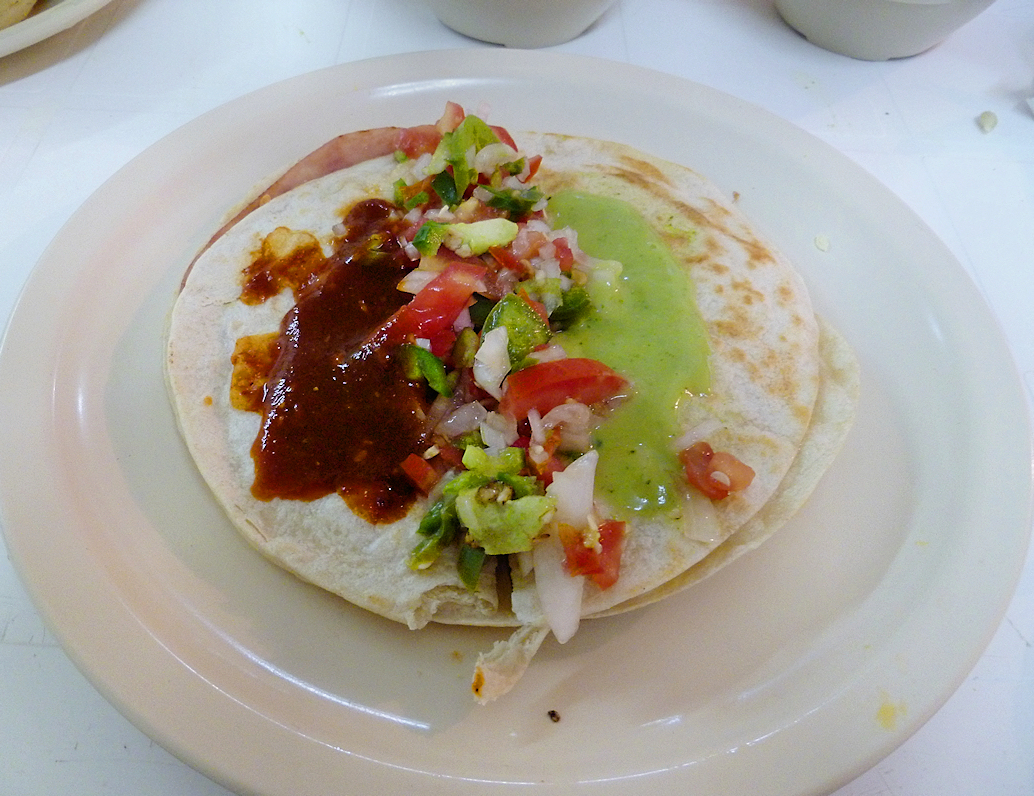
- A sincronizada made with ham, Oaxaca cheese and topped with salsa and pico de gallo
- Course: Lunch, snack
- Place of origin: Mexico
- Serving temperature: Warm
- Main ingredients: Ham, cheese, tortillas

The quesadilla sincronizada (Spanish pronunciation: [kesaˈðiʝa siŋkɾoniˈsaða], "synchronized quesadilla") is a flour tortilla-based sandwich made by placing ham, vegetables (like tomatoes, onion, etc.) and a portion of cheese (most commonly Oaxaca cheese) between two flour tortillas. They are then grilled or even lightly fried until the cheese melts and the tortillas become crispy, cut into halves or wedges and served, usually with salsa and pico de gallo, avocado or guacamole on top.

They are frequently confused with plain quesadillas, due to their resemblance to "quesadillas" sold in Mexico (U.S. quesadillas are usually made with flour tortillas rather than molded from masa in the Mexican style). Note however that despite the fact that it looks almost the same as a quesadilla, it is considered a separate dish. The main difference between the real quesadilla and the sincronizada is the obligatory inclusion of ham in the dish and the main ingredient used to make the tortilla (wheat flour instead of corn flour, masa harina). A quesadilla is made of a single folded and filled flour tortilla, while the sincronizada is prepared like a sandwich.

== Ingredients ==
Ingredients could vary between Oaxaca cheese, Manchego cheese and different types of ham. The sincronizada is sometimes consumed alone, but in most regions of Mexico it is common to add a regional sour cream, salsa or guacamole as topping to make a richer flavor. cheese, beef fajita meat and avocado and Monterey Jack cheese instead of the traditional Oaxacan one.

Sincronizadas are commonly consumed in the evening, as a component of a light merienda.

== See also ==
- Gringas
- List of Mexican dishes
- List of sandwiches
- Quesadilla
- Tortilla
