= Tortilla press =

Device for flattening dough for tortillas

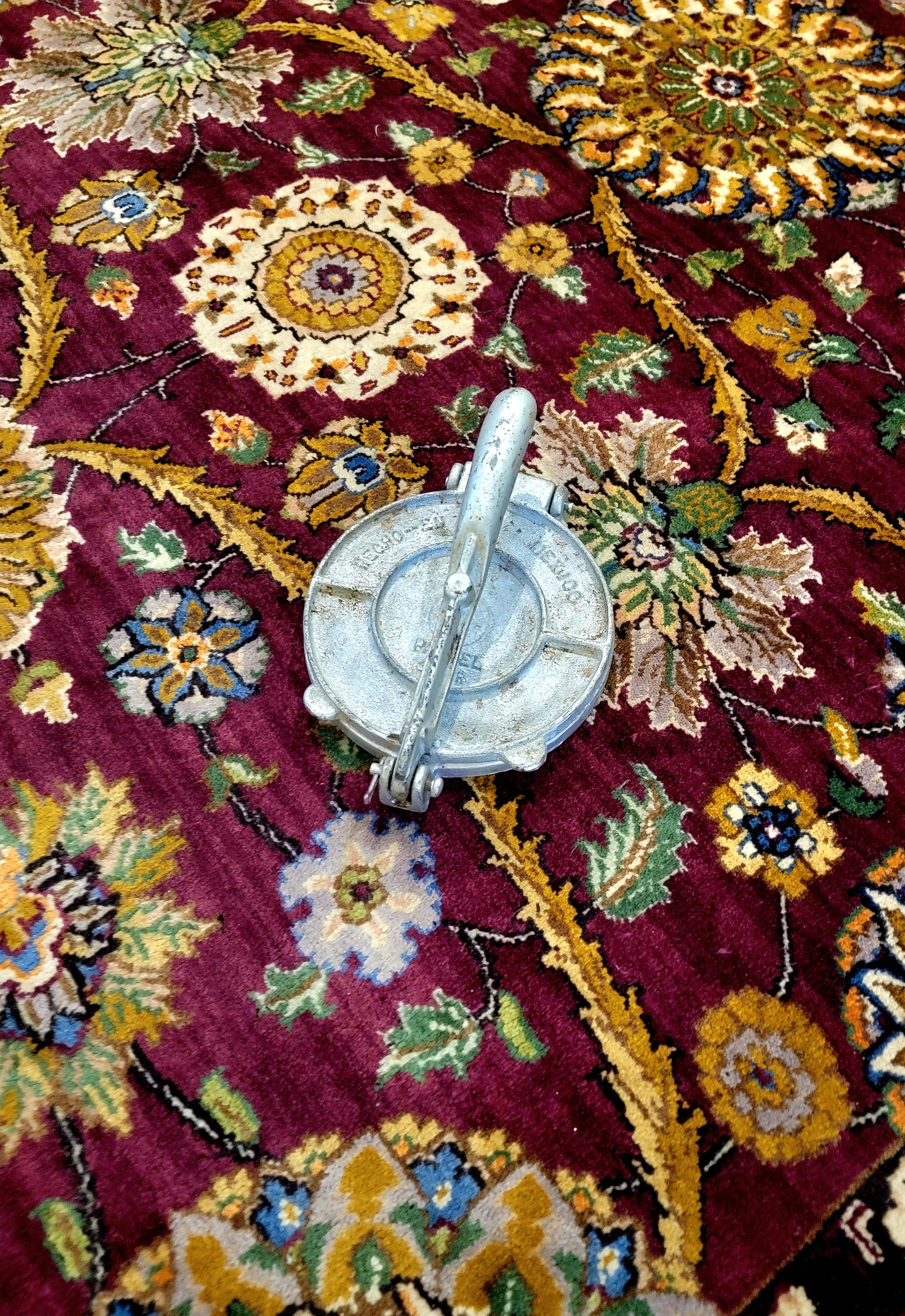
Closed tortilla press

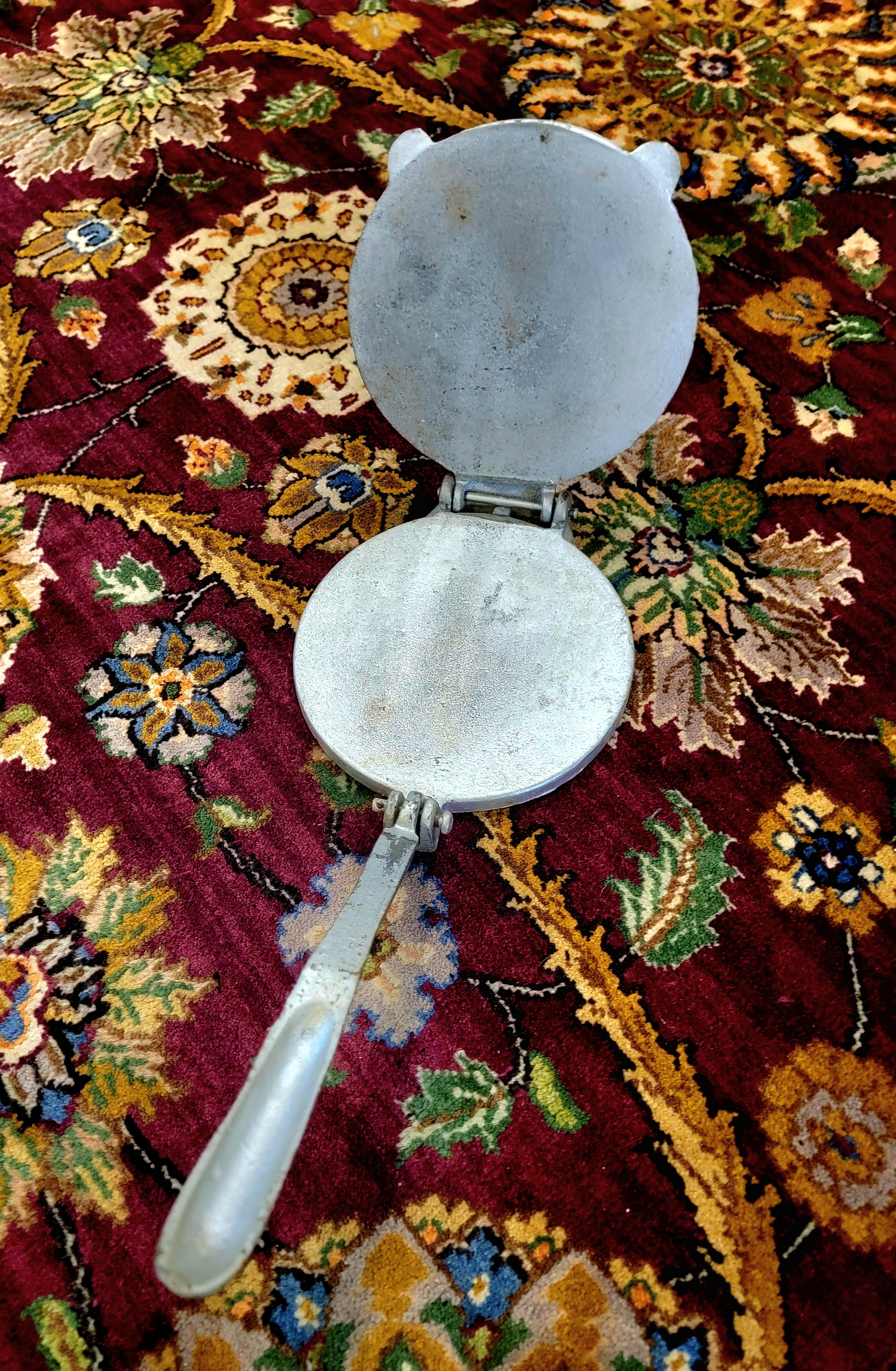
Open tortilla press

A tortilla press is a traditional Mexican device with a pair of flat round surfaces of about 8 inches in diameter, used to crush balls of dough in order to obtain round corn tortillas or flour tortillas. The tortillas are often pressed out between sheets of plastic or corn leaves. Tortilla presses are usually made of cast iron, cast aluminum or wood. This device was adopted in Indian cuisine to make puri bread (puri press).

== Maintenance and Use ==
Traditional tortilla presses require the presence of plastic wrap, wax paper, or butter paper under and above the dough to prevent the dough from sticking to the surface of the press. However, many modern tortilla presses instead feature non-stick surfaces. Unlike non-stick surfaces typical of other cookware, these require the application of oil (mineral oil for wood, as vegetable oil will go rancid) on the surface after use, in a process known as seasoning. Traditional tortilla presses do not need to be cleaned as the dough never touches the surface of the press. Some modern presses come with dishwasher safe faces that can be detached, while others need to be washed manually.

The amount of force required to produce a tortilla varies depending on the thickness of the desired tortilla and the machine, with tortilla presses constructed with lighter materials such as aluminum requiring greater force. Generally, less force required is required than with a rolling pin.

=== General Steps to Using a Tortilla Press ===
1. Use ground corn or corn flour to make the dough, traditionally called masa.
2. Cut two squares of wax paper and place one on the face of the press (this step and the next are not required when using a modern tortilla press).
3. Place the dough on the wax paper and another piece of wax paper on top of the dough.
4. Using the handle to bring the other face of the press onto the dough ensuring the wax paper stays in place.
5. Force the handle closed, pressing until the dough is flattened to the desired thickness. You may have to open and reorient the dough to get a well shaped circle.
