= Masa =

Corn dough used in Latin American dishes

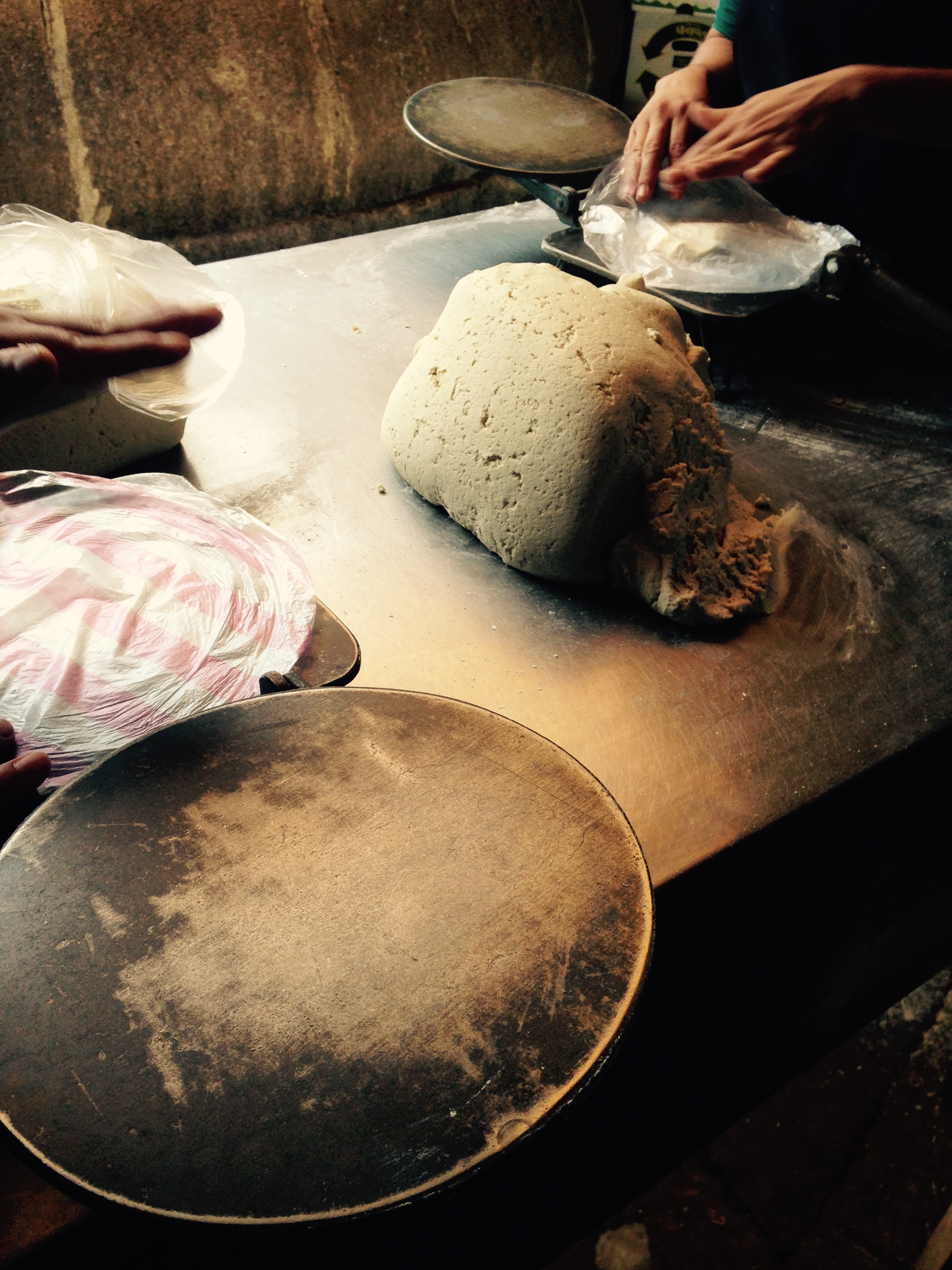
- Masa dough for tortillas
- Type: Dough
- Associated cuisine: Mexican
- Main ingredients: Hominy

Masa or masa de maíz (English: /ˈmɑːsə/; Spanish pronunciation: [ˈmasa]) is a dough made from ground nixtamalized corn. It is used for making corn tortillas, gorditas, tamales, pupusas, and many other Latin American dishes.

It can be dried and ground into a flour known as harina de maíz or masa harina. Masa is reconstituted by mixing with water before using it in cooking. In Spanish, masa means "dough" and harina means "flour". Although masa harina is widely used in English to refer to flour made from nixtamalized maize, the expression is not a conventional Spanish term.

== History ==
The origins of masa are associated with the domestication of maize in Mesoamerica, which began approximately 9,000 years ago in what is now southwestern Mexico. Maize gradually spread throughout Mesoamerica and became an important staple crop among Indigenous communities. Archaeological evidence indicates that maize was cultivated in parts of Central America by approximately 5000 BCE.

The development of nixtamalization, the process of cooking and soaking maize kernels in an alkaline solution, was an important innovation in traditional Mesoamerican food preparation. The process softened the kernels, made them easier to grind and improved the nutritional availability of certain nutrients, particularly niacin. The resulting dough could be used to prepare a variety of foods, including tortillas and tamales.

Although the precise date and location of the invention of nixtamalization remain uncertain, archaeological research has provided direct evidence of the practice among ancient Maya communities. In 2022, researchers identified microscopic starch residues associated with nixtamalized maize in archaeological deposits at San Bartolo, in the Petén region of Guatemala. The remains were recovered from two underground pits dating to the Late and Terminal Classic periods, providing direct evidence of the process during approximately the seventh or eighth century CE.

Following European colonization in the 16 century, maize-based foods and traditional preparation techniques continued to be used throughout Mexico and Central America. Over subsequent centuries, masa remained an important ingredient in regional cuisines, with different communities developing distinctive foods and preparation methods. In the twentieth century, industrial processing contributed to the wider commercial availability of masa products. The development and commercialization of dried masa flour, commonly known as masa harina, allowed consumers to prepare masa by adding water rather than grinding freshly cooked maize. Industrial production retained the fundamental principles of traditional nixtamalization while introducing mechanized cooking, grinding and drying processes.

Today, masa continues to be widely used in Mexican and Central American cuisines and is an important component of traditional foods such as tortillas, tamales, pupusas and gorditas.

== Preparation ==
Field corn grain is dried and then treated by cooking the mature, hard grain in a diluted solution of slaked lime (calcium hydroxide) or wood ash and then letting it soak for many hours. The soaked maize is then rinsed thoroughly to remove the unpalatable flavor of the alkali. This process is nixtamalization, and it produces hominy, which is ground into a relatively dry dough to create fresh masa. The fresh masa can be sold or used directly, or can be dehydrated and blended into a powder to create masa harina, or masa flour.

Lime and ash are highly alkaline, which helps the dissolution of hemicellulose, the major glue-like component of the maize cell walls, and loosens the hulls from the kernels and softens the corn. Some of the corn oil is broken down into emulsifying agents (monoglycerides and diglycerides), while bonding of the corn proteins to each other is also facilitated. The divalent calcium in lime acts as a cross-linking agent for protein and polysaccharide acidic side chains.

The chemical changes in masa allow dough formation, and also allow the nutrient niacin to be absorbed by the digestive tract. By contrast, untreated cornmeal is unable to form dough on the addition of water, and a diet heavily reliant on its consumption is a risk factor for pellagra.

== Other uses ==
The ground product can be called masa nixtamalera. In Central American and Mexican cuisine, masa nixtamalera is cooked with water and milk to make a thick, gruel-like beverage called atole. When made with chocolate and sugar, it becomes atole de chocolate. Adding anise and piloncillo to this mixture creates champurrado, a popular breakfast drink.

== See also ==
- Maize flour
