= Güirila =

Maize tortilla

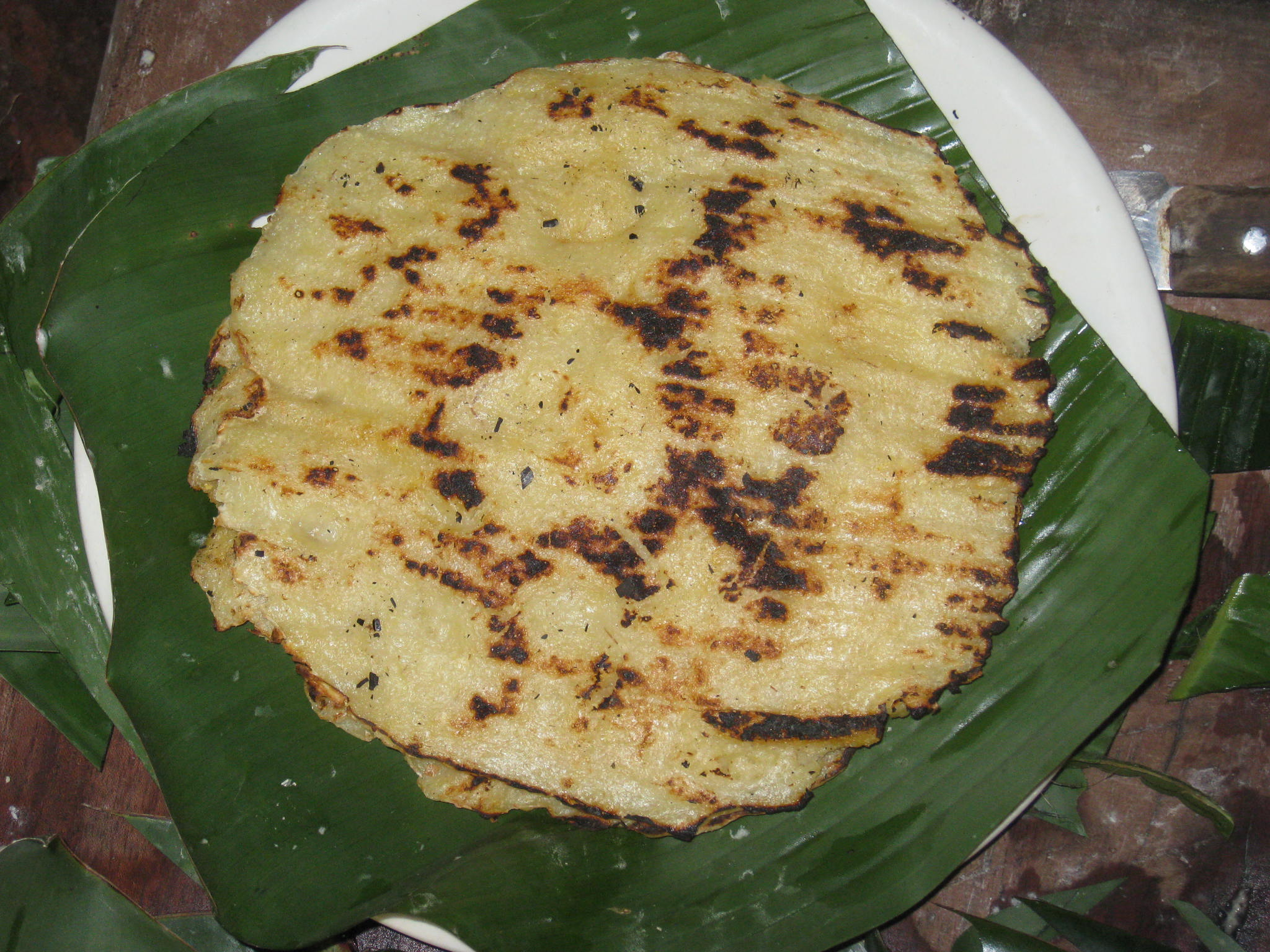
- Güirila
- Type: Bread
- Place of origin: Nicaragua
- Region or state: Matagalpa
- Main ingredients: White corn

A güirila is a sweet type of tortilla made from young white maize. They are usually eaten with crema (sweet or sour cream) and cuajada, a type of salty Nicaraguan crumbled white cheese.

The güirilas are made from shelling sweet young maize, milling it and cooking or grilling the mixture in banana leaves to prevent them from sticking or burning. Sugar and/or salt are usually the only additions to the mix itself, although adding milk is common for street vendors who wish to stretch out the mixture. They are also typically eaten alongside meat or pork, or as a snack by itself.

Güirilas originated in Matagalpa, in the north of Nicaragua. The city made history when they made a güirila that was just over 650 ft. in circumference at the National Corn Fair.
