= Tortilla soup =

Mexican soup

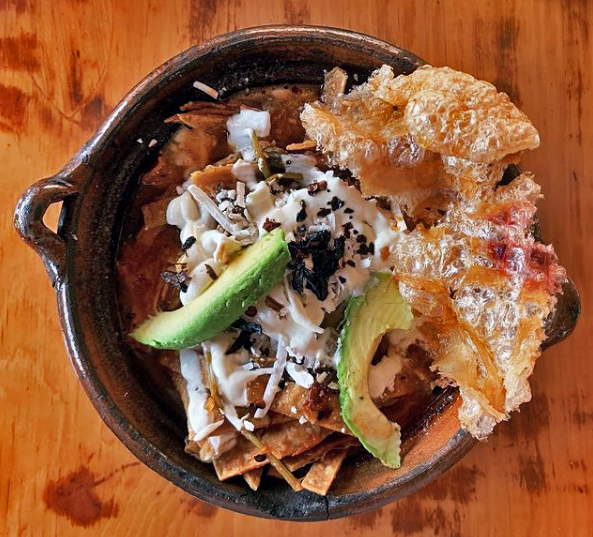
A bowl of tortilla soup, garnished with cheese, avocado, and chicharrón

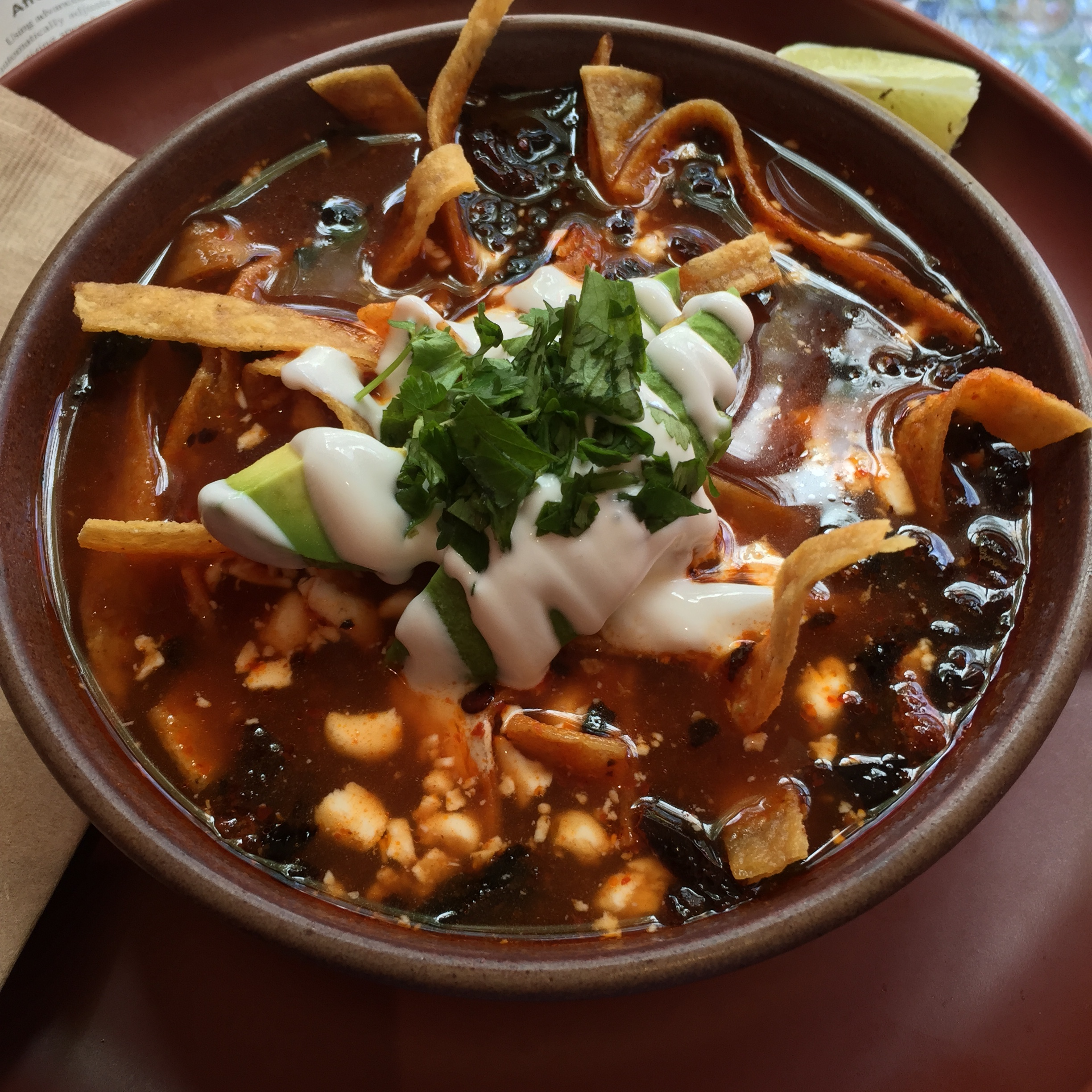
Tortilla soup in situ

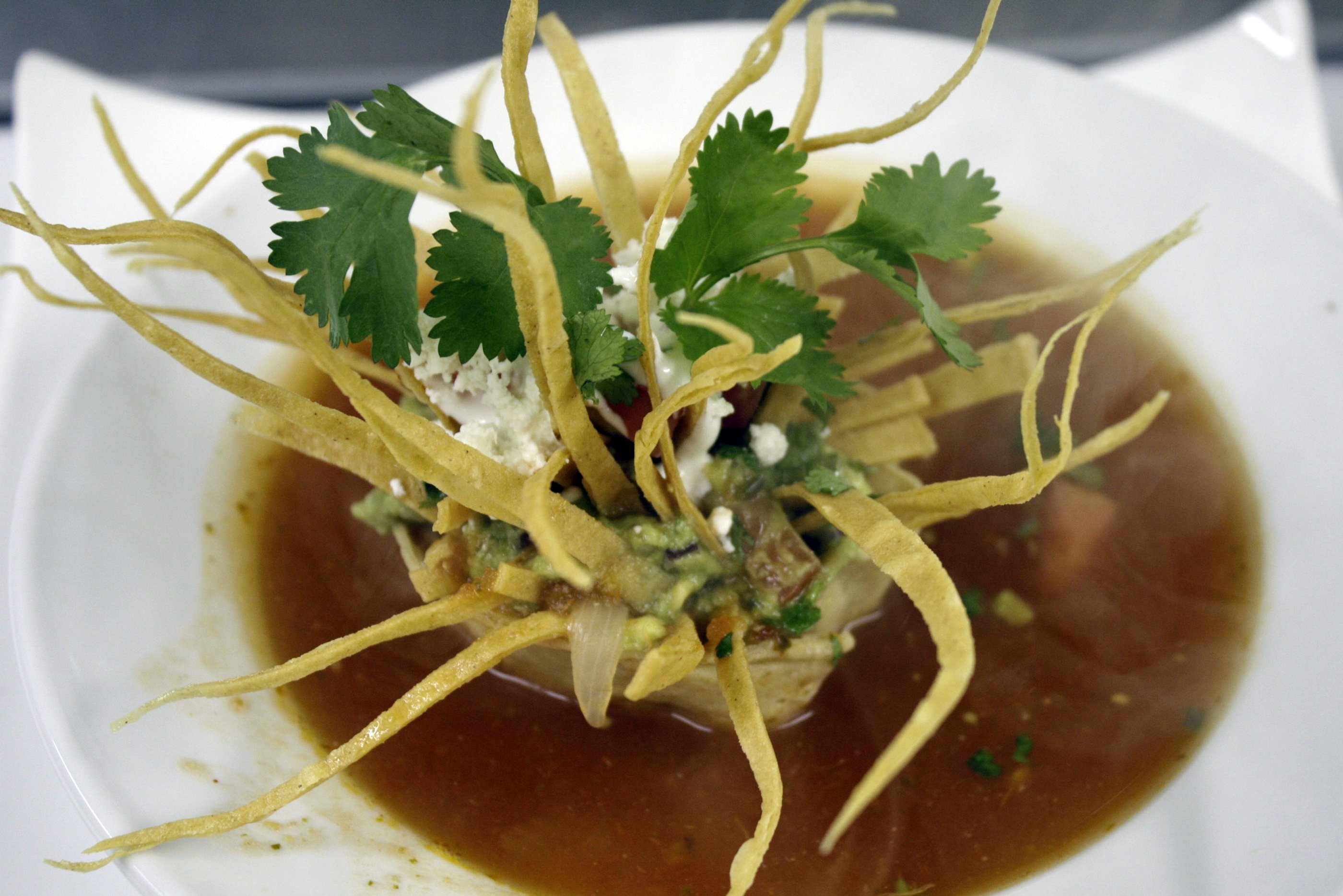
Sopa de tortilla

Tortilla soup (Spanish: sopa de tortilla) is a traditional Mexican soup containing fried corn tortilla. Although the exact origin of tortilla soup is unknown, it is particularly common in the Mexico City area in Mexico. Traditional tortilla soup is made with chicken broth combined with roasted tomatoes, onion, garlic, chiles and tortillas, cut into strips and fried.

Traditional tortilla soup is made of fried corn tortilla pieces, submerged into a broth of tomato, garlic, onion, and epazote. It is served with pieces of pasilla chiles, chicharrón, avocado, queso panela, lime, and Mexican crema. While pasilla chiles are the most commonly used, regional variants also may use chile ancho or chile de arbol.

== See also ==
- List of soups
