= Cuajada =

Basque-Hispanic cheese

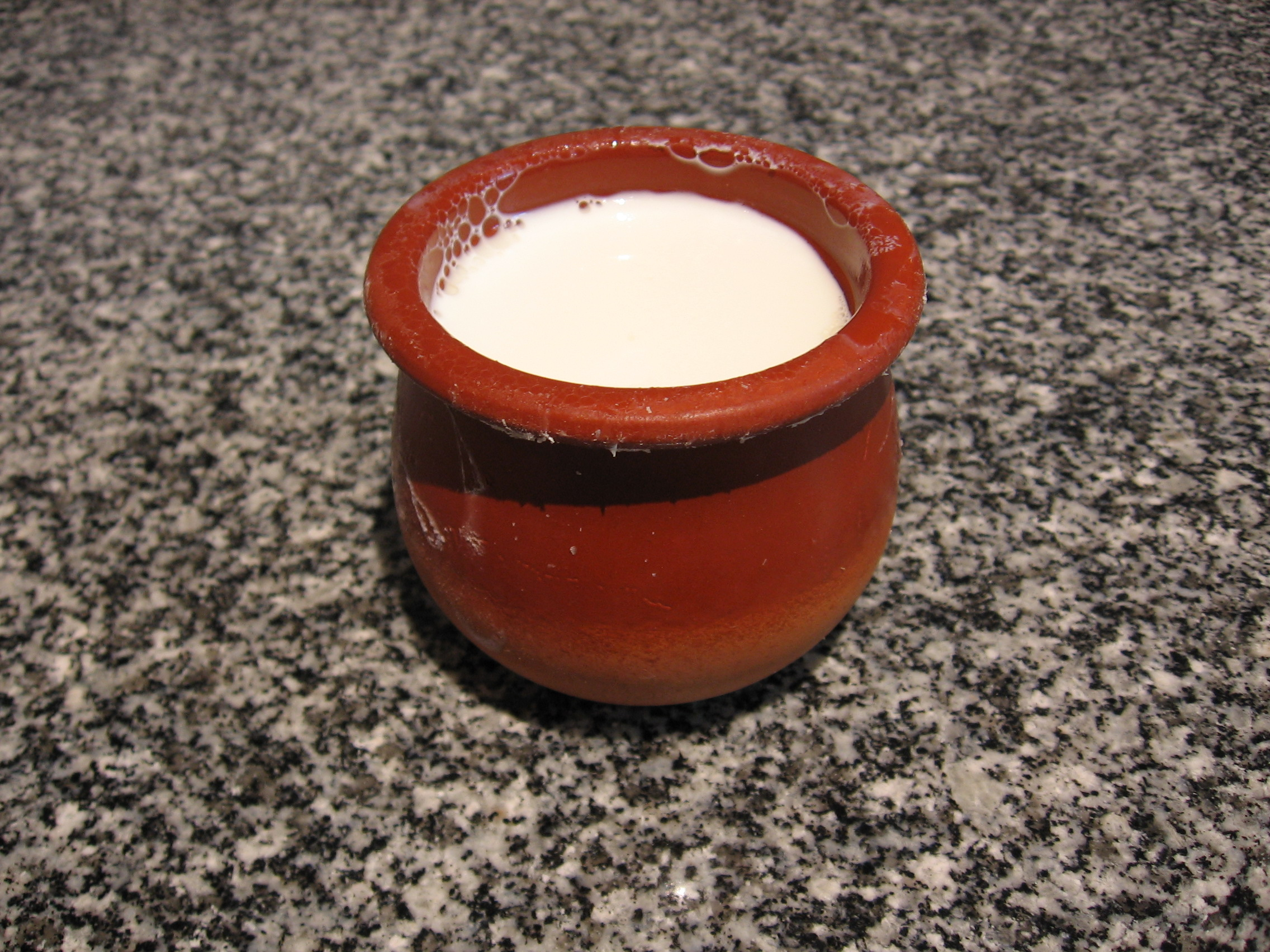
- Type: milk curd
- Place of origin: Spain
- Main ingredients: Ewe's milk or cow's milk

Cuajada (milk curd) is a dairy product traditionally made from sheep's milk, but now it is more often made industrially from cow's milk. It is popular in the northern regions of Spain (Asturias, Cantabria, Basque Country, Navarre, Aragon, Castile and Leon, and La Rioja). In Latin America it is popular in Colombia, Venezuela, and in the Central American countries of El Salvador, Honduras, Nicaragua, and in the northern region of Costa Rica.

Raw warmed milk is mixed with rennet or plant extracts and left to curdle. It was traditionally made in a wooden vessel called kaiku and heated with a red-hot poker, giving it a distinct faintly burned taste. Commercial individual servings of cuajada are sold refrigerated in earthenware pots, but modernly plastic containers such as those of yogurt are also sold. Cuajada means "curdled" in Spanish. In Basque, it is called mami.

Cuajada is usually served as dessert with honey and walnuts or sometimes sugar, and less often, for breakfast with fruit or honey. In Colombia, it is typically served with melado, a thick syrup made of panela. In Nicaragua, salt is usually added to the cuajada, which is eaten with güirilas and other dishes

== Coalhada ==
A similar product named coalhada (Portuguese for "curdled") is found mostly in Brazil, and its consumption is widespread in Northeastern Brazil and rural areas in other regions, where traditional recipes are more common. It is made from raw milk, which is curdled by adding whey from previous coalhadas. It is usually eaten alone or with yuca flour, sweetened with sugar, honey or molasses.

== See also ==
- List of Brazilian dishes
- List of dairy products
- Junket
