= Pupusa =

Central American dish

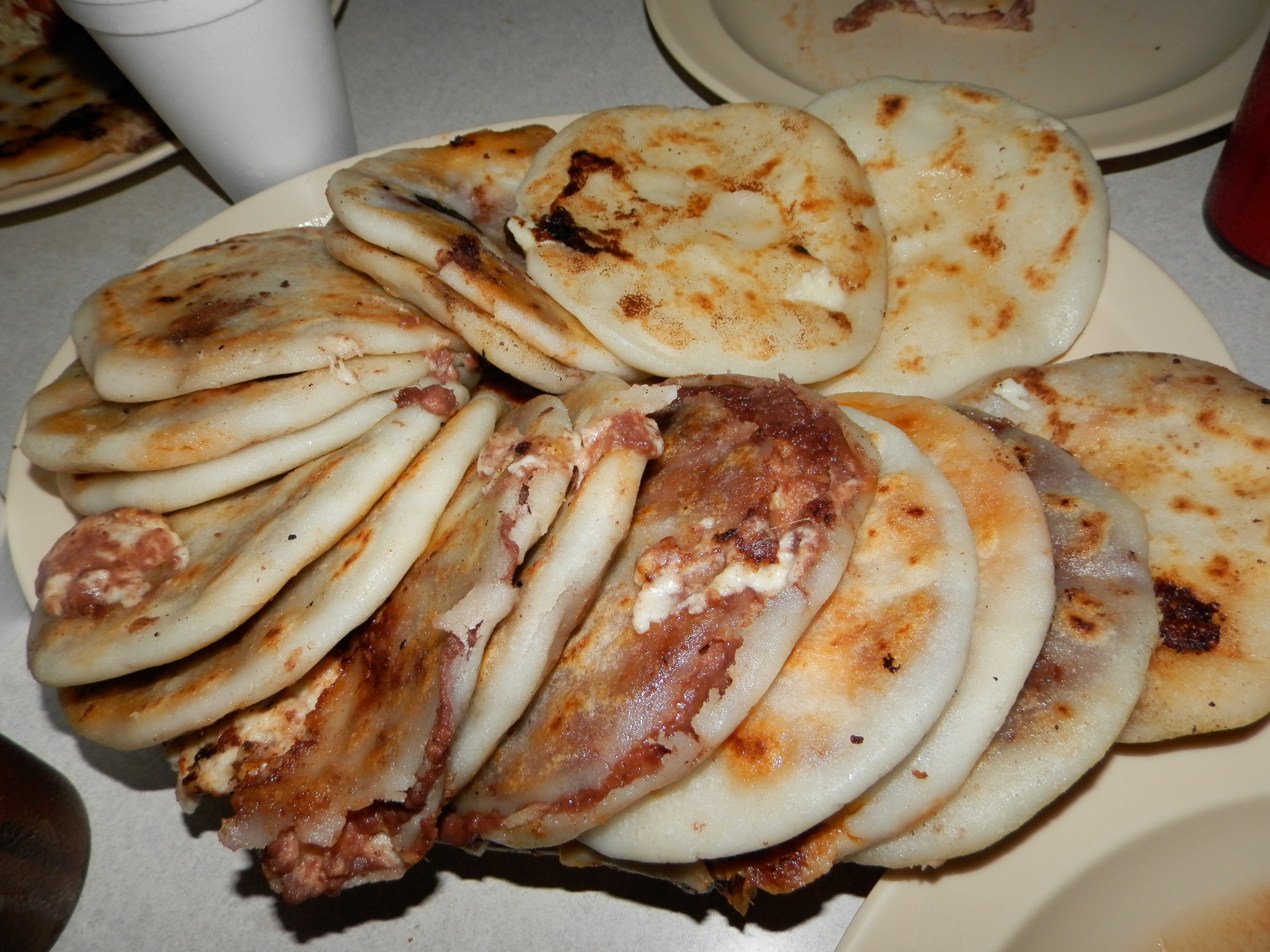
- Several prepared pupusas
- Place of origin: El Salvador; Honduras
- Region or state: Central America
- Serving temperature: Hot
- Main ingredients: Corn or rice flour Fillings (e.g. meat, cheese, beans, vegetables)
- Food energy (per serving): 350 kcal (1,500 kJ)

A pupusa is a thick griddle cake or flatbread from El Salvador and Honduras made with cornmeal or rice flour stuffed with one or more ingredients including cheese, beans, chicharrón, or squash. It can be served with curtido and tomato sauce and is traditionally eaten by hand. Pupusas have origins in Pre-Columbian Mesoamerica but were first mentioned in 1837 by Guatemalan poet José Batres Montúfar. The pupusa is the national dish of El Salvador. In El Salvador, the pupusa has a national holiday dedicated to it, which is celebrated on the second Sunday of November every year.

== Etymology ==
The origin of the term pupusa is unknown. The Dictionary of Americanisms, published by the Association of Academies of the Spanish Language, states that pupusa derives from the Nawat word (spoken by the Pipil people) puxahua meaning "fluffy" or "fluffy thing". In Lidia Pérez de Novoa's book Interlude and Other Verses, she believed that pupusa derives from the Nawat word pupusawa meaning "to puff up". Ricardo Ernesto Roque, a professor at the Central American University in San Salvador, supported this etymology.

Salvadoran linguist Jorge Lemus argued that the word pupusa does not have Nawat roots, stating that the Pipil people referred to pupusas as kukumuzin. In Santiago Barberena's book Quicheísmos: Contribution to the Study of American Folklore..., he believed that the word pupusa originated from a combination of the K'iche' words pop (meaning "sphere") and utz (meaning "good thing"), forming the word poputz meaning "good sphere"; however, the term poputz does not appear in any K'iche' language dictionaries.

== Origin ==
El Salvador and Honduras both claim to be the origin of the pupusa. Roque attributed the pupusa's origin to the Pipil people as he claims the term derived from a Nawat word, and he claims that a Nawat word would make El Salvador the pupusa's origin. Héctor Miguel Leiva Carías, a professor at the National Autonomous University of Honduras, thinks that Roque's reliance on word origin to determine food origin was not correct, as Nawat was also spoken in Honduras. Salvadoran anthropologist Ramón Rivas does not attribute the pupusa to any country in particular except to state that it originated in Mesoamerica in general.

The pupusa's origin was discussed during negotiations for the Dominican Republic–Central America Free Trade Agreement (CAFTA–DR) in 2003. El Salvador wanted to patent the pupusa as an exclusive export. Honduran negotiator Melvin Redondo ceded the right to El Salvador, stating that Honduras did not intend to challenge El Salvador on the matter. In 2018, the World Trade Organization listed El Salvador as the pupusa's denominación de origen ("designation of origin").

== History ==
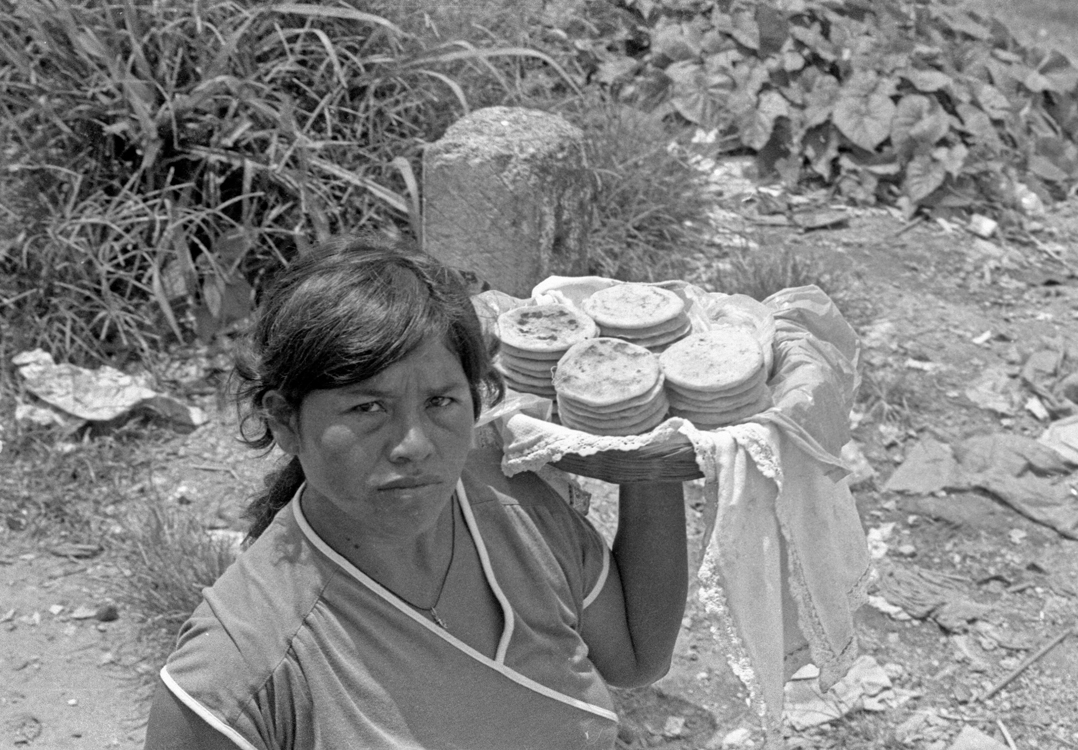
A woman with pupusas in Apopa in 1990

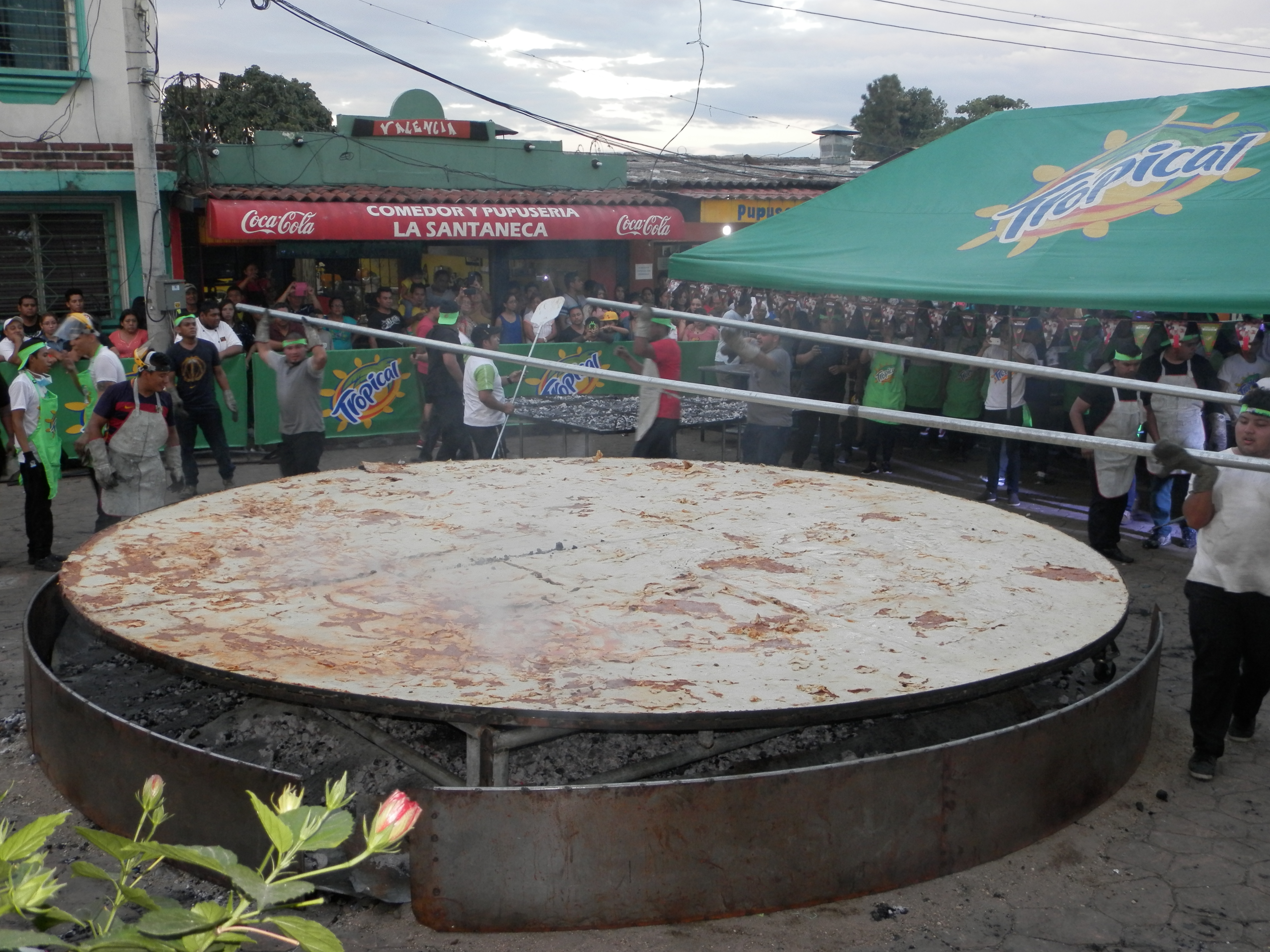
A 5.5-meter-wide (18 ft) pupusa created in Antiguo Cuscatlán in 2016

The earliest ancestral dish of the pupusa originated in the Pre-Columbian era in modern-day El Salvador, Honduras, and Guatemala as a thick corn tortilla. Franciscan friar Bernardino de Sahagún wrote in 1570 that Indigenous Americans prepared a dish consisting of a mixture of dough, beans, and meat in Pre-Columbian Mesoamerica.

The earliest mention of modern pupusas was made by Guatemalan poet José Batres Montúfar in 1837. In a letter to his family, he described encountering a dish in Nicaragua similar to pupusas, known as rellenas. The letter remarked on their similarity to pupusas, which he ascribed to being from San Salvador. The pupusa was also mentioned by Honduran writer Alberto Membreño in Diccionario de Hondureñismos, where he described it as an empanada "escompuesto de queso, frijoles, etc., encerrado en una tortilla y cocido en el comal" ("composed of cheese, beans, etc., enclosed in a tortilla and cooked on a comal"). At the time, pupusas were most commonly eaten by the poor and prepared in rural areas.

When corn became scarce in the late 1930s, some Salvadorans replaced corn flour with rice flour to make pupusas. This way of making pupusas, known as pupusas de arroz, began in Olocuilta. Pupusas de arroz spread further during the Salvadoran Civil War due to increased corn scarcity. The popularity of pupusas in the United States grew as refugees from the civil war began preparing the dish in their new communities.

Guinness World Records has recognized a records for the largest pupusa created. As of 2024, the record belongs to a 6.1-meter-wide (20 ft) pupusa made in Washington, D.C.

== Preparation ==
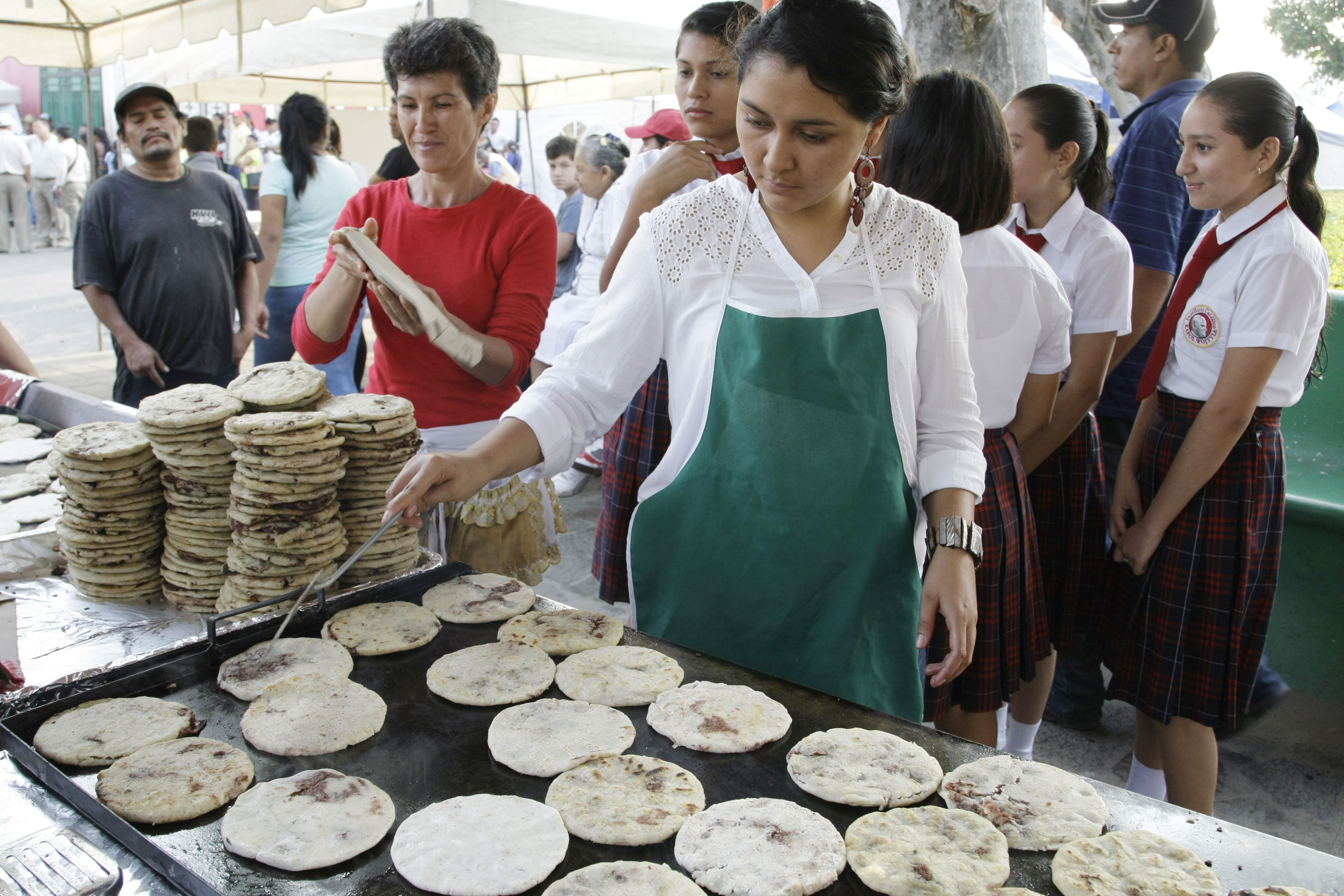
Pupusas being cooked on a comal

A pupusa is a handmade maize or rice tortilla stuffed with ingredients. Traditional stuffings can include cheese, refried beans, squash, loroco, and chicharrón. Variants can also be stuffed with shrimp, chicken, avocados, or jalapeño peppers, among other ingredients. Pupusas can be served alongside curtido (a type of spicy coleslaw), tomato sauce, plantains, tamales, and vegetables. Pupusas are cooked on comals and are traditionally eaten by hand. According to the Food and Agriculture Organization, each pupusa averages around 350 calories. Locations that specialize in the preparation of pupusas are known as pupuserías. Pupusas can also be served as street food.

== Cultural significance ==
=== El Salvador ===
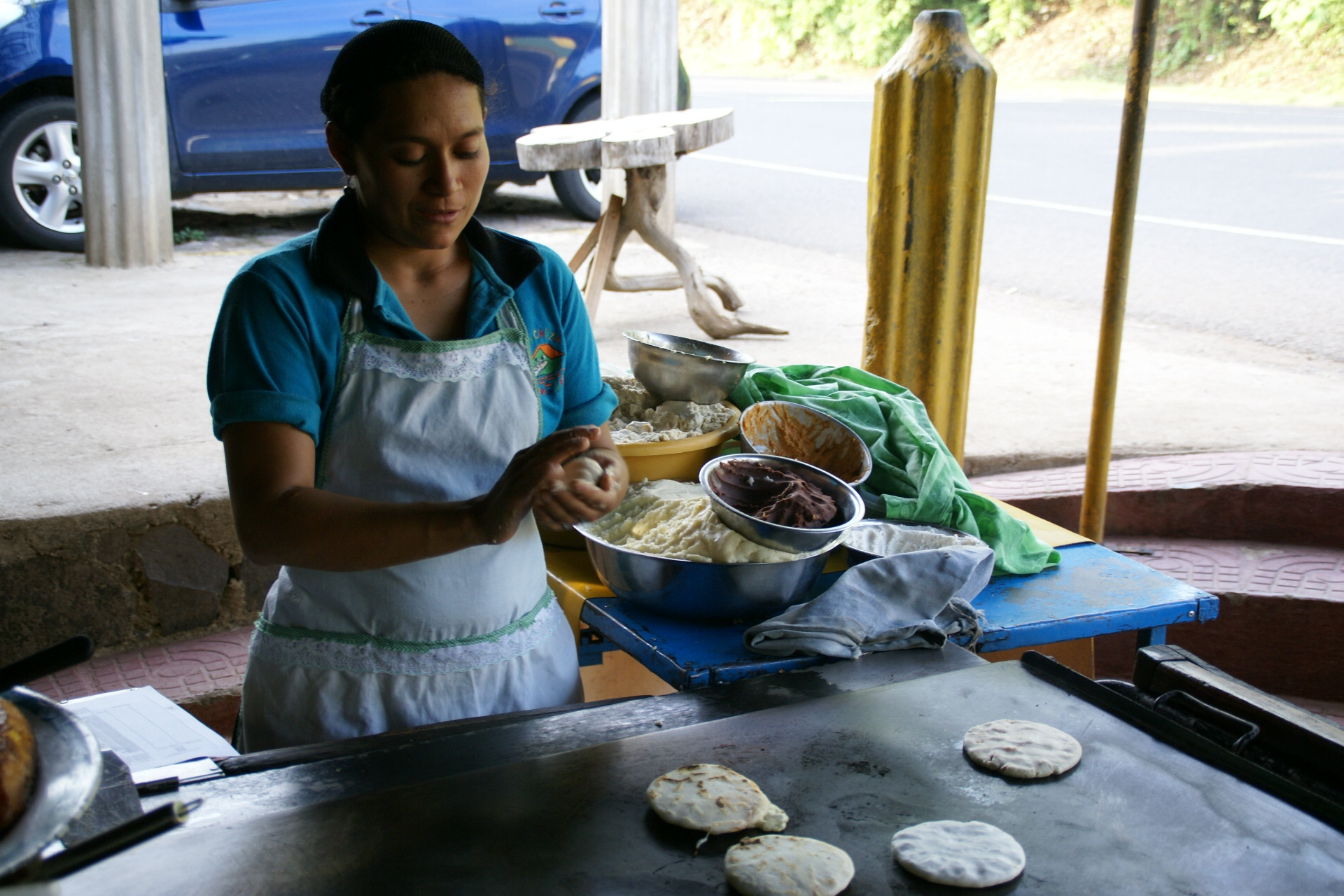
A woman making pupusas in Ahuachapán

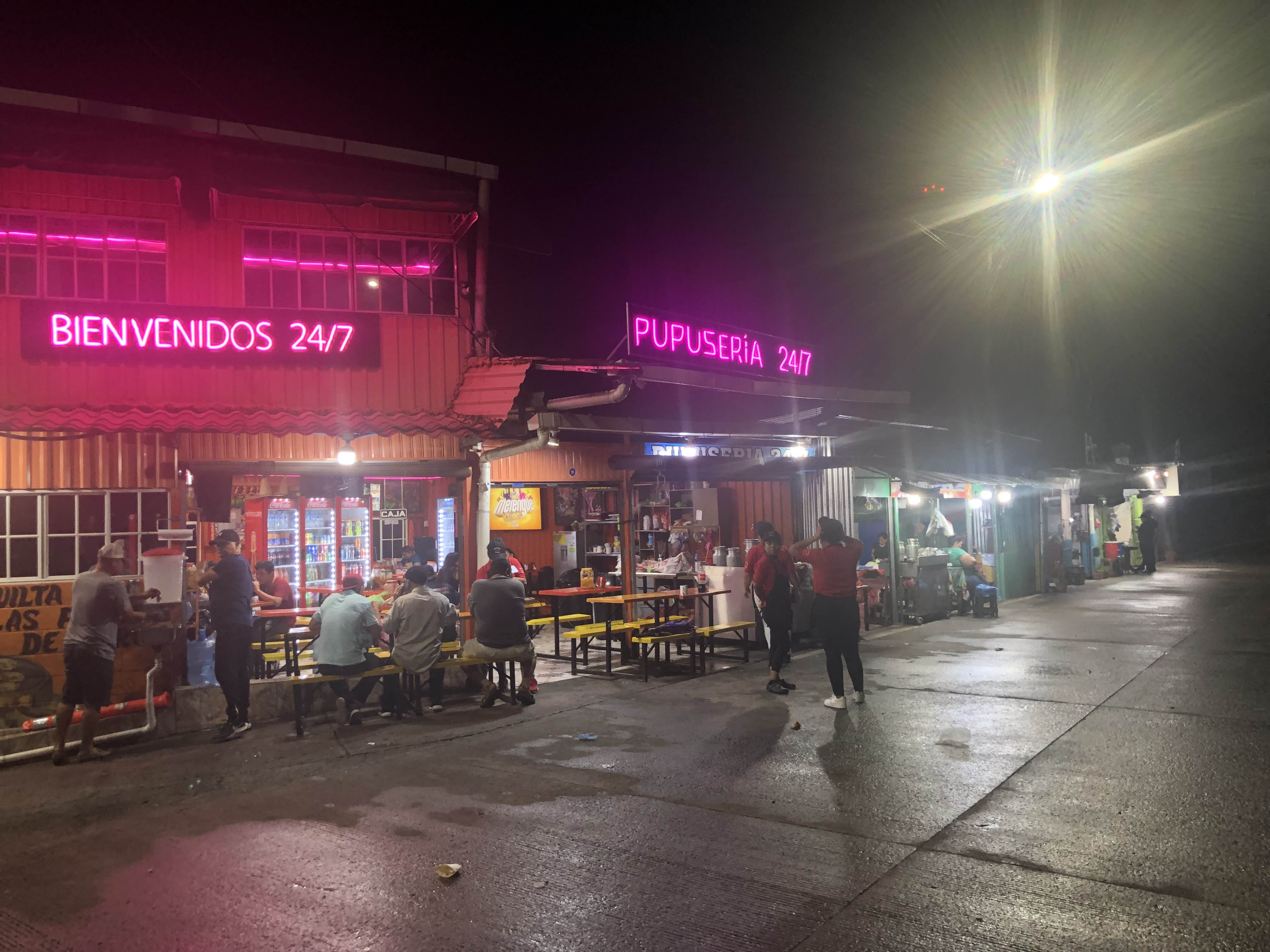
Pupuserías in Olocuilta, nicknamed the "city of pupusas"

In El Salvador, the pupusa's cultural importance grew significantly during the Salvadoran Civil War as pupusas spread to and became popular in the United States in the 1980s. On 20 April 2005, the Legislative Assembly of El Salvador approved Decree 655 that declared the second Sunday of November to be National Pupusa Day (Día Nacional de las Pupusas). November was chosen as it marks the peak of corn harvesting in El Salvador.

Pupusa sales play a significant role in the Salvadoran economy. According to the Ministry of Economy, pupuserías generated US$22 billion in revenue between 2001 and 2003. In 2004, the Salvadoran Chamber of Consulting Entrepreneurs estimated that Salvadorans consumed around US$1.6 million worth of pupusas each weekend. By 2005, around 300,000 people made pupusas for a living, with a majority of them being women.

The city of Olocuilta is nicknamed the "city of pupusas" ("ciudad de las pupusas"). Olocuilta has four locations known as pupusódromos where several pupuserías are located in close proximity with each other. Salvadoran director Héctor Mojica produced a miniseries titled Las Pupusas about the dish. It was released on Amazon Prime Video in 2022 and 2023.

=== United States ===
Pupusas spread to the United States during the 20th century when Central American immigrants moved to the country to escape violence in their home countries and opened pupuserías in the U.S. Pupusas are commonly eaten in cities such as Los Angeles, San Francisco, Washington, D.C., and New York City. The Guardian named pupusas the 2011 Best Street Food in New York City. Taco Cabana, a Tex-Mex chain in Texas, created a dish called the pupusa that consists of chicken strips in a corn tortilla. It has no relation to the Central American dish.

== See also ==
- Latin American cuisine
- List of maize dishes
- List of street foods
