= El Cholo Spanish Cafe =

Los Angeles restaurant that serves Mexican food

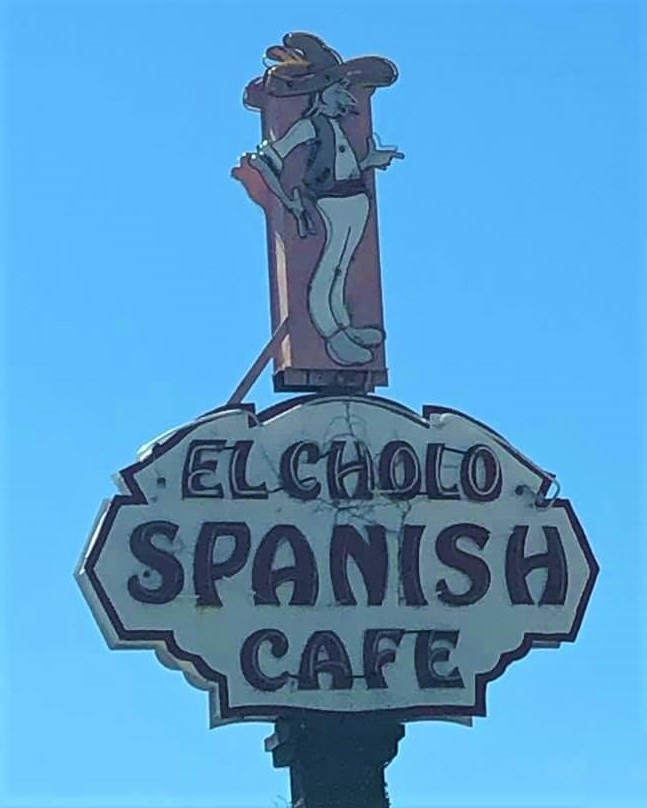
- El Cholo Spanish Cafe neon sign
- Interactive map of El Cholo Spanish Cafe

Restaurant information
- Established: 1923
- Owner: Ron Salisbury
- Food type: Mexican food
- Location: 1121 South Western Avenue, Los Angeles, California, 90006, United States
- Website: www.elcholo.com

El Cholo Spanish Cafe is a Los Angeles based restaurant serving Mexican food. Founded in 1923, the restaurant is credited with the introduction of the burrito to the United States in the 1930s. The restaurant has expanded to a chain with six locations in Southern California. It celebrated its 100th anniversary in 2023.

== History ==
In 1923, Alejandro and Rosa Borquez opened the Sonora Cafe at Santa Barbara Avenue and Moneta Avenue in Exposition Park, near where the Coliseum now stands. In 1925, a guest came into the restaurant and drew a caricature that he called a 'El cholo' – at that time referring to "field hands" of the Spanish settlers. Alejandro liked the image and changed the name of the restaurant to "El Cholo" with the drawing becoming its mascot. Alejandro and Rosa's daughter Aurelia, and her husband George Salisbury, later opened a second location at 1107 Western Avenue at the western edge of the city (now Koreatown). In 1931, the restaurant moved across the street to its current location.

When it opened, the restaurant advertised that it specialized in "Spanish food", which was a whitewashed euphemism for Mexican food. It is credited with the first restaurant-style burritos in U.S. El Cholo is considered a forerunner of other Mexican restaurants. Carmen Rocha, a waitress at El Cholo, is credited with introducing nachos to Los Angeles in 1959. (Note: Nachos are credited to Ignacio Anaya in the 1940s in Piedras Negras, Coahuila, Mexico.) The dish – made of layered tortilla chips, melted cheddar cheese, and slices of jalapeno peppers – was a recipe learned in her native San Antonio, Texas.

The Borquez family has roots in the northwestern Mexican state of Sonora, and the food offered by the restaurant (e.g. enchiladas, tamales, albondigas, chile rellenos, refried beans) reflects the regional cuisine. Items on the menu note their times of introduction (e.g. flour tortilla [1923], chile con carne [1923], nachos [1959], chimichangas [1967], crabmeat enchilada [1971], and filet mignon tacos [2009]). The restaurant is also known for its green tamales.

Its proximity to Hollywood made the restaurant popular with those in the entertainment industry, though its clientele represented all parts of the community. Louis Zamperini used memories of the restaurant to keep up his spirits while being held at a Japanese prisoner-of-war camp. The restaurant has expanded to six locations in Southern California, starting in 1962 with its second location on Whittier Boulevard in La Habra.

== Gallery ==
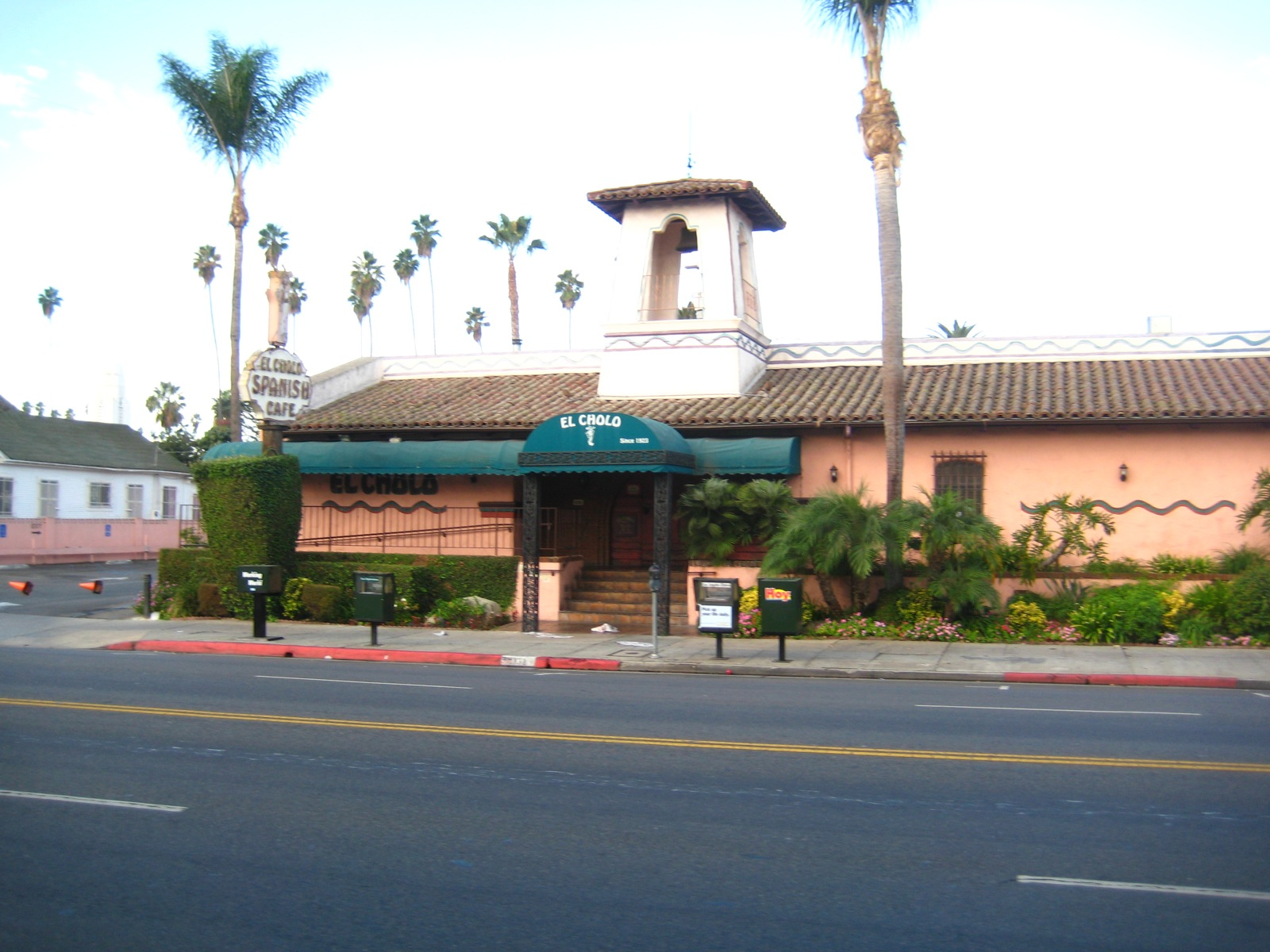
El Cholo Spanish Cafe in 2008.

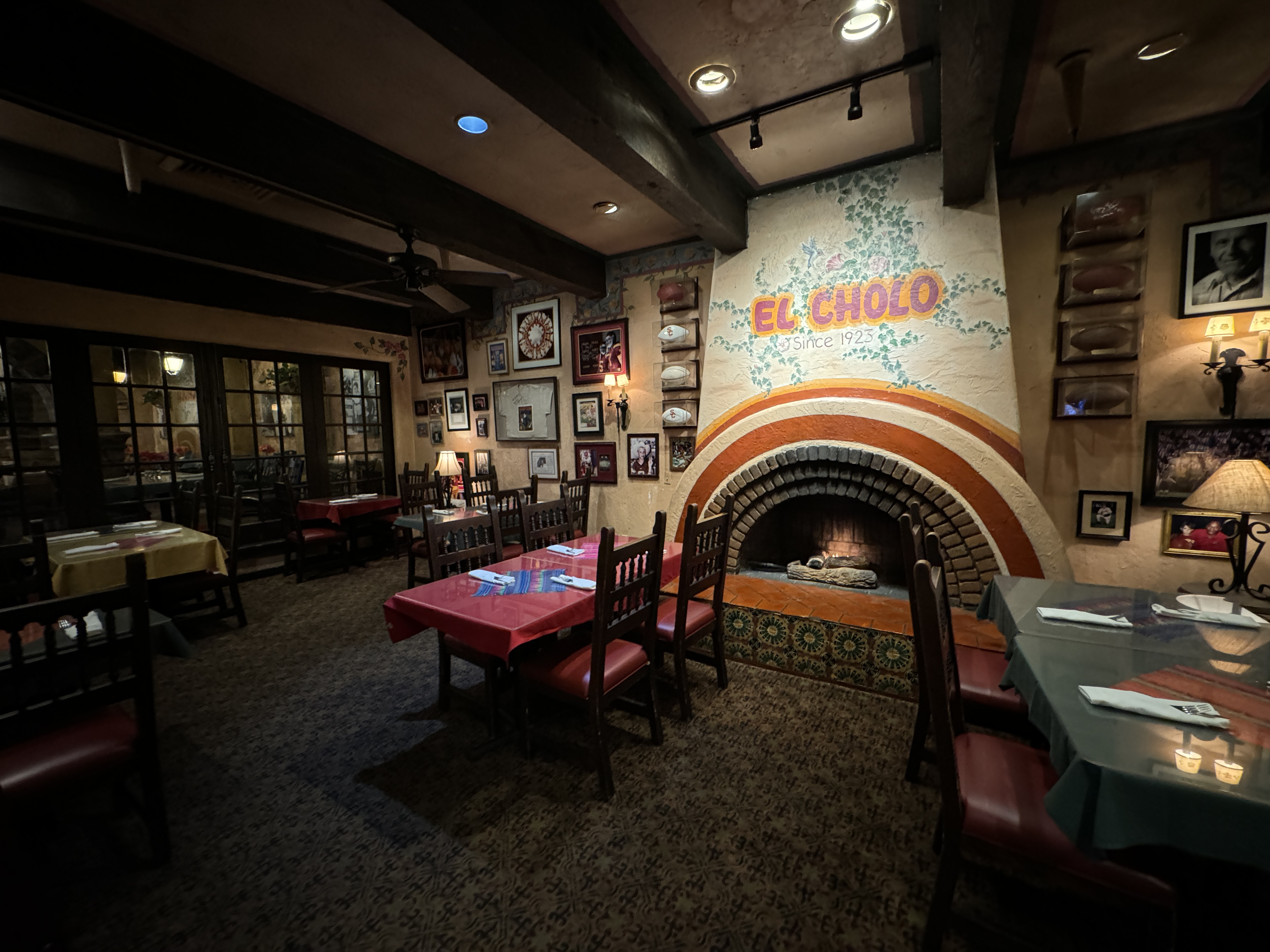
The original fireplace and dining room at El Cholo Spanish Cafe in 2024.

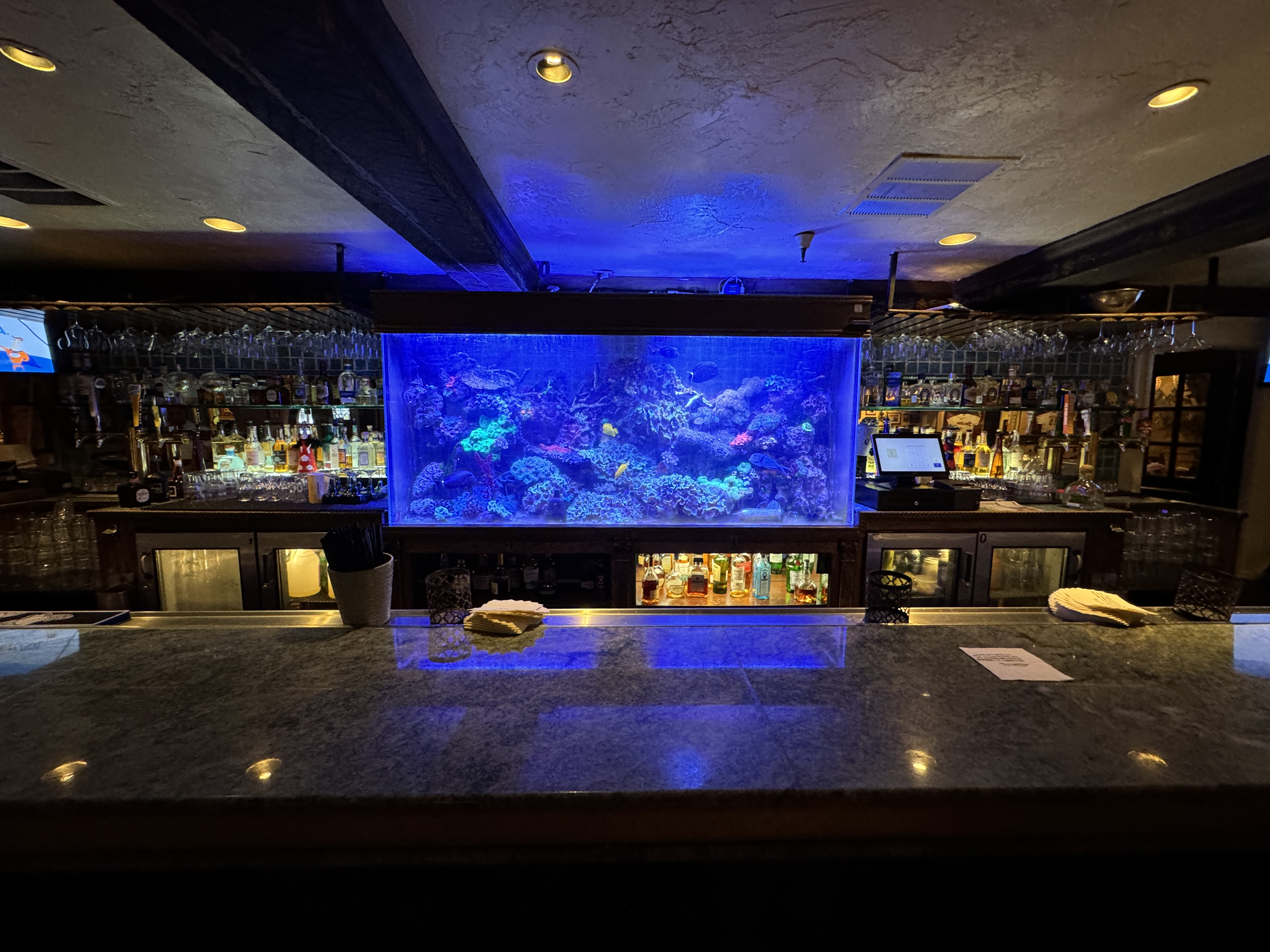
The bar at El Cholo Spanish Cafe in 2024.

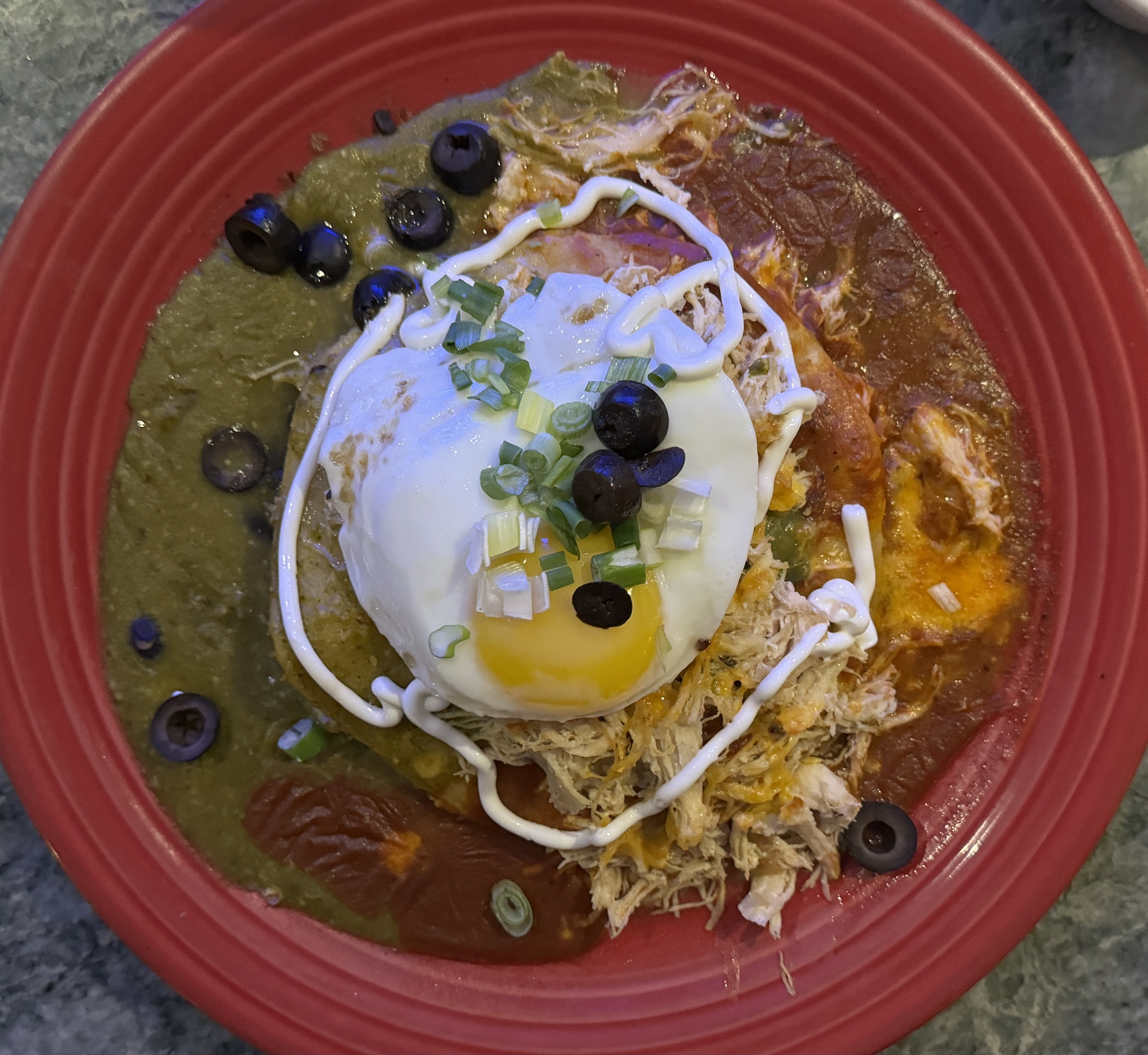
The Sonoran style enchilada at El Cholo Spanish Cafe in 2024. This dish was on one of the first dishes offered at the restaurant in 1923.
