= Tostada =

Tostada may refer to:

- Tostada (toast), a Latin American toast
- Tostada (tortilla), a Mexican fried tortilla and the dish based on it

== See also ==
- Tostado (disambiguation)
