= Tortilla chips =

Snack food made from corn tortillas

Tortilla chip
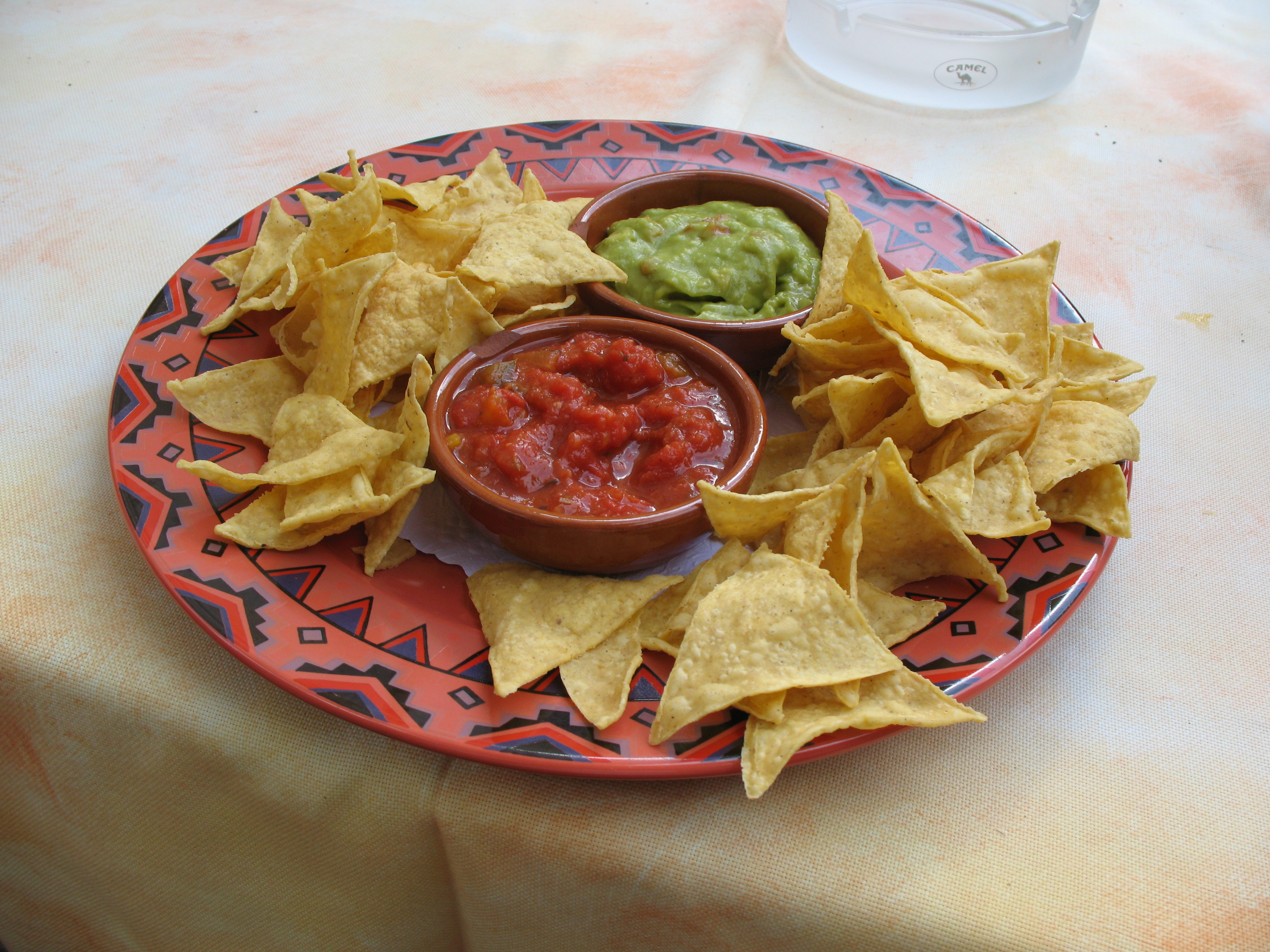
- A plate of tortilla chips with salsa and guacamole
- Type: Snack food
- Place of origin: Mexico
- Main ingredients: Tortillas (corn, vegetable oil, salt, water)

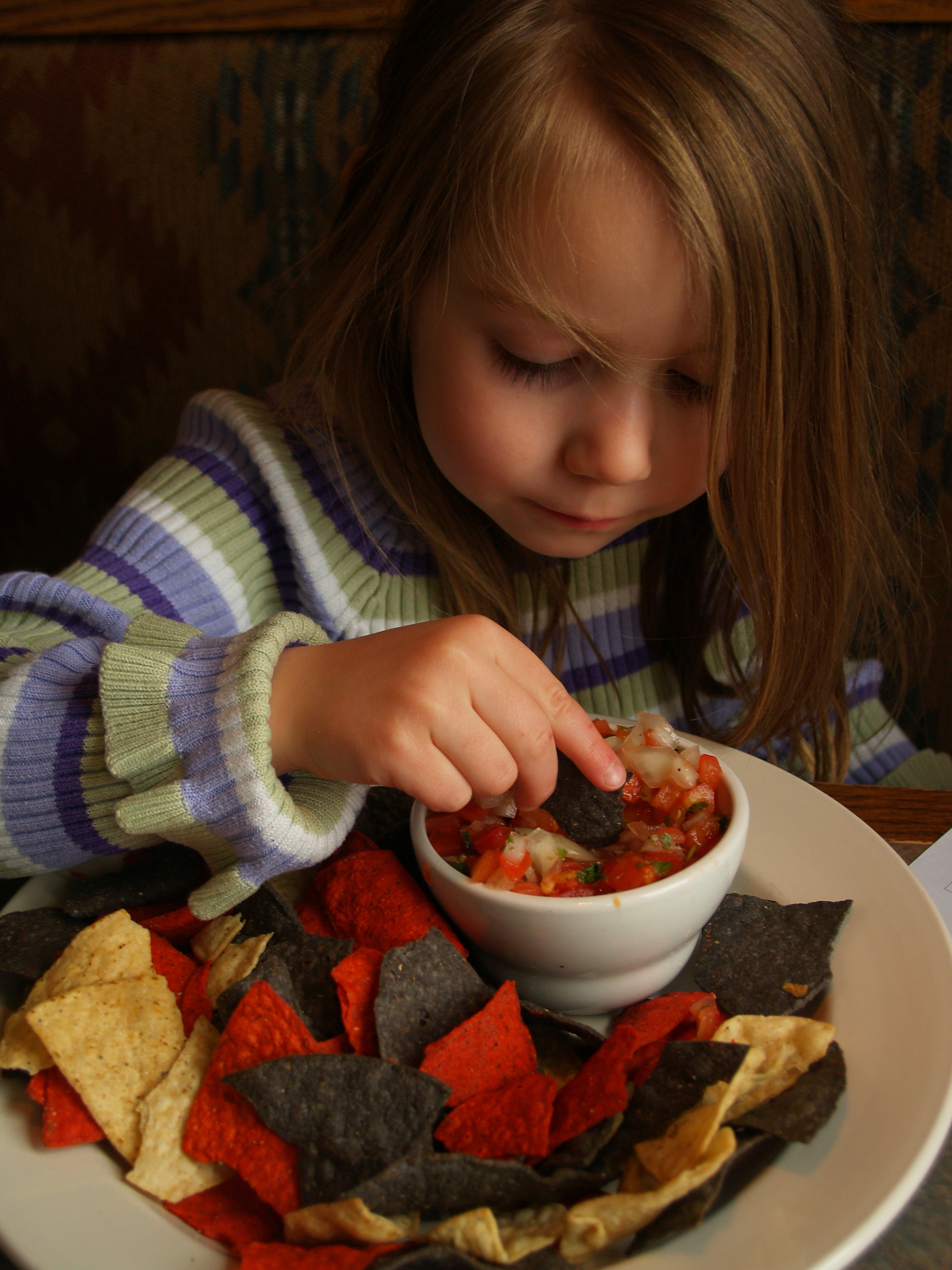
A young girl eating tortilla chips with pico de gallo

A tortilla chip is a snack food made from corn tortilla, which are cut into triangles and then fried or baked (alternatively they may be discs pressed out of corn masa then fried or baked). Corn tortillas are made of nixtamalized corn, vegetable oil, salt and water. Although first mass-produced commercially in the U.S. in Los Angeles in the late 1940s, tortilla chips grew out of Mexican cuisine, where similar items were well known, such as totopos and tostadas.

Though usually made of yellow corn, they can also be made of white, blue, or red corn. Tortilla chips intended to be dipped are typically only lightly salted, while others may be seasoned with a variety of flavors. Tortilla chips may be served as a garnish for soups or dishes such as chili con carne.

== History ==
Ignacio Anaya used triangles of fried tortilla for the nachos he created in 1943.

The triangle-shaped tortilla chip was popularized by Rebecca Webb Carranza in the 1940s as a way to make use of misshapen tortillas rejected from the automated tortilla manufacturing machine that she and her husband used at their Mexican delicatessen and tortilla factory in southwest Los Angeles. Carranza found that the discarded tortillas, cut into triangles and fried, were a popular snack, and she sold them for a dime a bag at the El Zarape Tortilla Factory. In 1994, Carranza received the Golden Tortilla award for her contribution to the Mexican food industry.

== Tex-Mex and Mexican cuisine ==
Tortilla chips are a popular appetizer in Tex-Mex and Mexican restaurants in the U.S. and elsewhere. Their popularity outside of California saw a steady rise in the late 1970s when they began to compete with corn chips, the dipping chip of choice during the first three quarters of the 20th century. Tortilla chips are typically served with a dip, such as salsa, chile con queso, or guacamole. When not served with a dip, the chips are often seasoned with herbs and spices. Although they are now available worldwide, the United States is one of the main markets for tortilla chips. Commercial brand names for tortilla chips include Tostitos, Doritos, Phileas Fogg snacks, and Don Tacos (in Japan).

A more elaborate dish utilizing tortilla chips is nachos. First created in 1943, nachos were invented in Mexico. "They originated in the small Mexican town of Piedras Negras in 1943 and were invented by restaurateur Ignacio 'Nacho' Anaya." Nachos are tortilla chips served with melted or shredded cheese, although often other toppings are added or substituted, such as meat, salsa (such as pico de gallo), refried beans, guacamole, sour cream, diced onions, olives, and pickled jalapeños. More elaborate nachos are often baked for a short period of time to warm the tortillas and melt shredded cheese.

== Corn chips ==
A similar fried corn snack is the corn chip, which is not made from a tortilla, but from corn meal which has been processed into a particular shape, typically a small scoop. Fritos are an example of this. The principal difference between the corn in tortilla and corn chips is that the corn in a tortilla chip has undergone a process known as nixtamalization, which involves processing the raw corn with quicklime.

== See also ==
- Bean chips
- Chalupas
- Chips and dip
- Flautas
- Gorditas
- List of maize dishes
- List of tortilla-based dishes
- Quesadillas
- Sopes
- Taquitos
- Tlacoyos
- Tlayudas
- Totopos
