= Nachos =

Tortilla chip dish

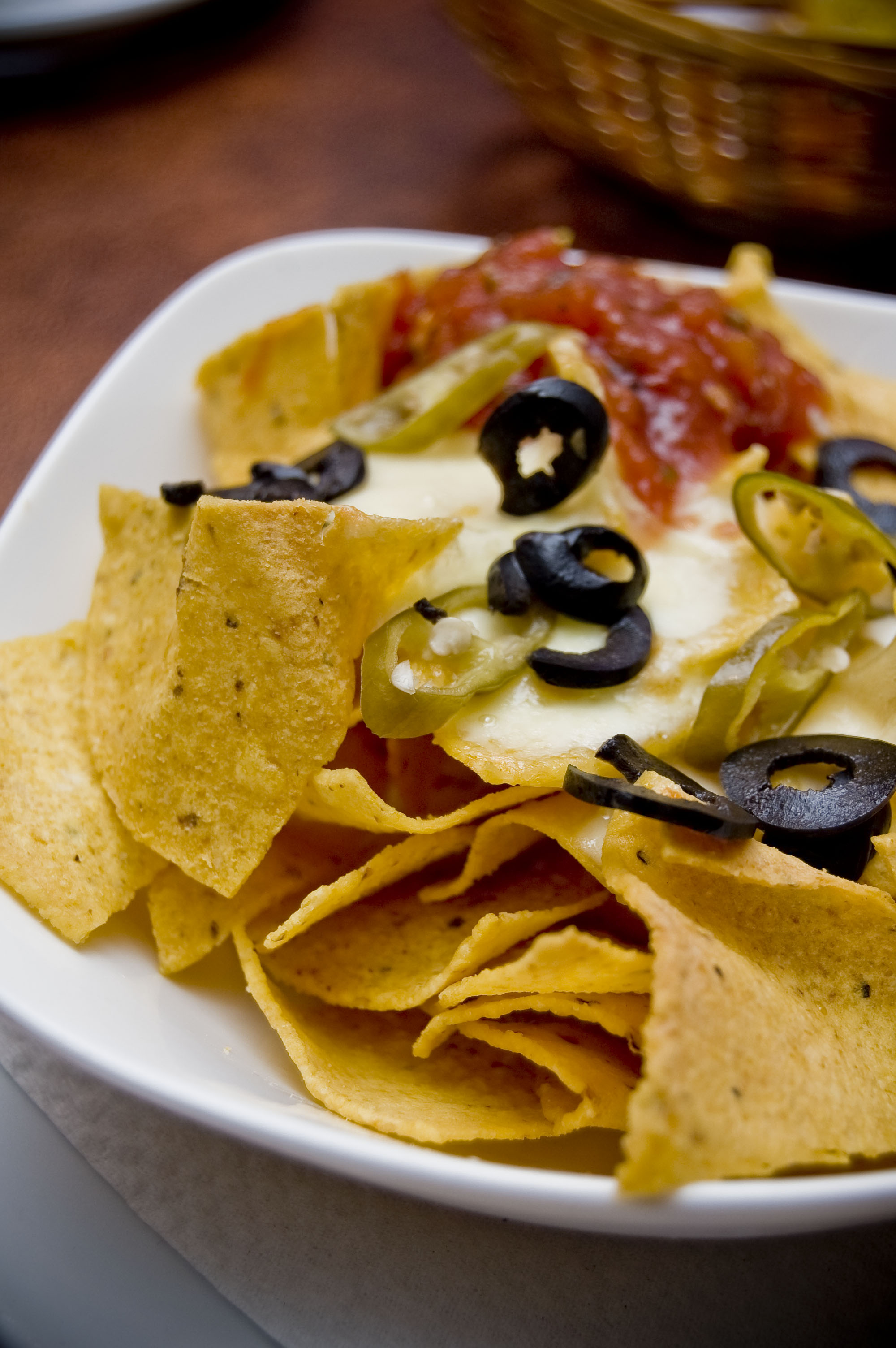
- Nachos with tortilla chips, olives, jalapeño peppers, sour cream, and salsa
- Course: Snack, appetizer, or main course
- Place of origin: Mexico
- Region or state: Piedras Negras, Coahuila; Mexico–United States border
- Associated cuisine: Tex-Mex cuisine
- Created by: Ignacio Anaya
- Main ingredients: Tortilla chips, cheese
- Ingredients generally used: Various toppings

Nachos are a Tex-Mex dish consisting of tortilla chips or totopos covered with cheese or chile con queso, as well as a variety of other toppings and garnishes, often including meats (such as ground beef or grilled chicken), vegetables (such as chili peppers, lettuce, tomatoes, and olives), and condiments such as salsa, guacamole, or sour cream. At its most basic form, nachos may consist of merely chips covered with melted cheese (usually cheddar or American cheese), or cheese sauce and served as an appetizer or snack, while other versions are substantial enough to serve as a main course. The dish was created by, and named after, Mexican restaurateur Ignacio "Nacho" Anaya, who created it in 1943 for American customers at the Victory Club restaurant in Piedras Negras, Coahuila.

== History ==
Nachos originated in the city of Piedras Negras, Coahuila, across the Mexico-U.S. border from Eagle Pass, Texas. In 1943, Ignacio Anaya was a maître d' at a restaurant called the Victory Club, when a group of women whose husbands were officers stationed at the nearby U.S. Army base Fort Duncan, traveled across the border to eat there. Seeking to serve food to them quickly, but unable to find the cook, he cut fried tortillas into triangles, added shredded Colby cheese and sliced pickled jalapeño peppers,^{[Note 1]} and heated them. When asked what the dish was called, Anaya responded, "Well, I guess we can just call them Nacho's Special"; Nacho is a common nickname for Ignacio.

Anaya later opened his own restaurant, Nacho's Restaurant, in Piedras Negras. His original recipe was printed in the 1954 St. Anne's Cookbook.

The popularity of the dish swiftly spread throughout Texas and the Southwestern United States. The first known appearance of the word "nachos" in English dates to 1949, from the book A Taste of Texas. According to El Cholo Spanish Cafe history, waitress Carmen Rocha is credited with making nachos in San Antonio, Texas, before introducing the dish to Los Angeles at the cafe in 1959.

A modified version of the dish, with cheese sauce and prepared tortilla chips, was marketed in 1976 by Frank Liberto, owner of Ricos Products, during Texas Rangers baseball games at Arlington Stadium in Arlington, Texas. This version became known as "ballpark nachos". During the September 4, 1978, Monday Night Football game between the Baltimore Colts and Dallas Cowboys, sportscaster Howard Cosell enjoyed the name "nachos", and made a point of mentioning the dish in his broadcasts over the following weeks, further popularizing it and introducing it to a larger audience. Liberto died in 2017.

Ignacio Anaya died in 1975. In his honor, a bronze plaque was erected in Piedras Negras, and October 21 was declared the International Day of the Nacho. Anaya's son, Ignacio Anaya Jr., served as a judge at the annual nacho competition.

== Nutritional information ==
The nutritional breakdown and total calorie count for a serving of nachos typically depends on the type of nacho, type of cheese, and additional toppings (such as beef, jalapeños, etc.) that are included in the serving. Most typical corn tortilla chips contain about 15 calories per chip. Baked corn tortilla chips have about 6 calories per chip. There are also Multigrain tortilla chips that contain about 12 calories per chip. Mexican-style cheddar cheese contains about 110 calories per ounce. Adding an additional source of protein, such as chicken or beef, increases the calorie count by about 100 calories or so. All in all, a single serving of nachos can contain from 300 to 600 total calories.

A single serving of nachos also contains significant amounts of fat, sodium, and calcium. There are around 16 grams of fat, 816 mg of sodium, and 272 mg of calcium per serving of nachos. In other words, one serving contains 39% of the daily value for fat, 34% of the daily value for sodium, and 27% of the daily value for calcium.

== Variations ==
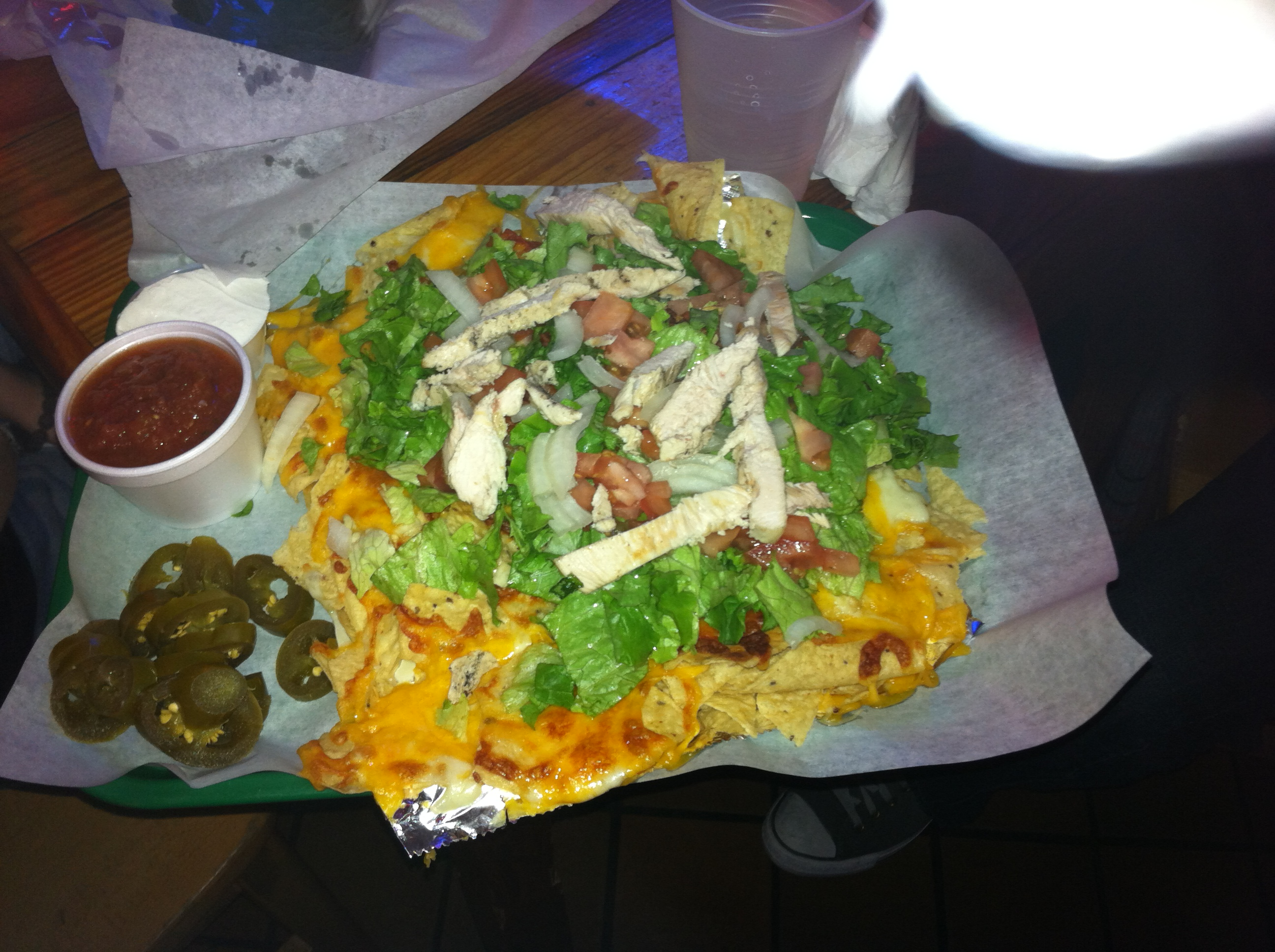
Nachos with chicken, with salsa and jalapenos on the side

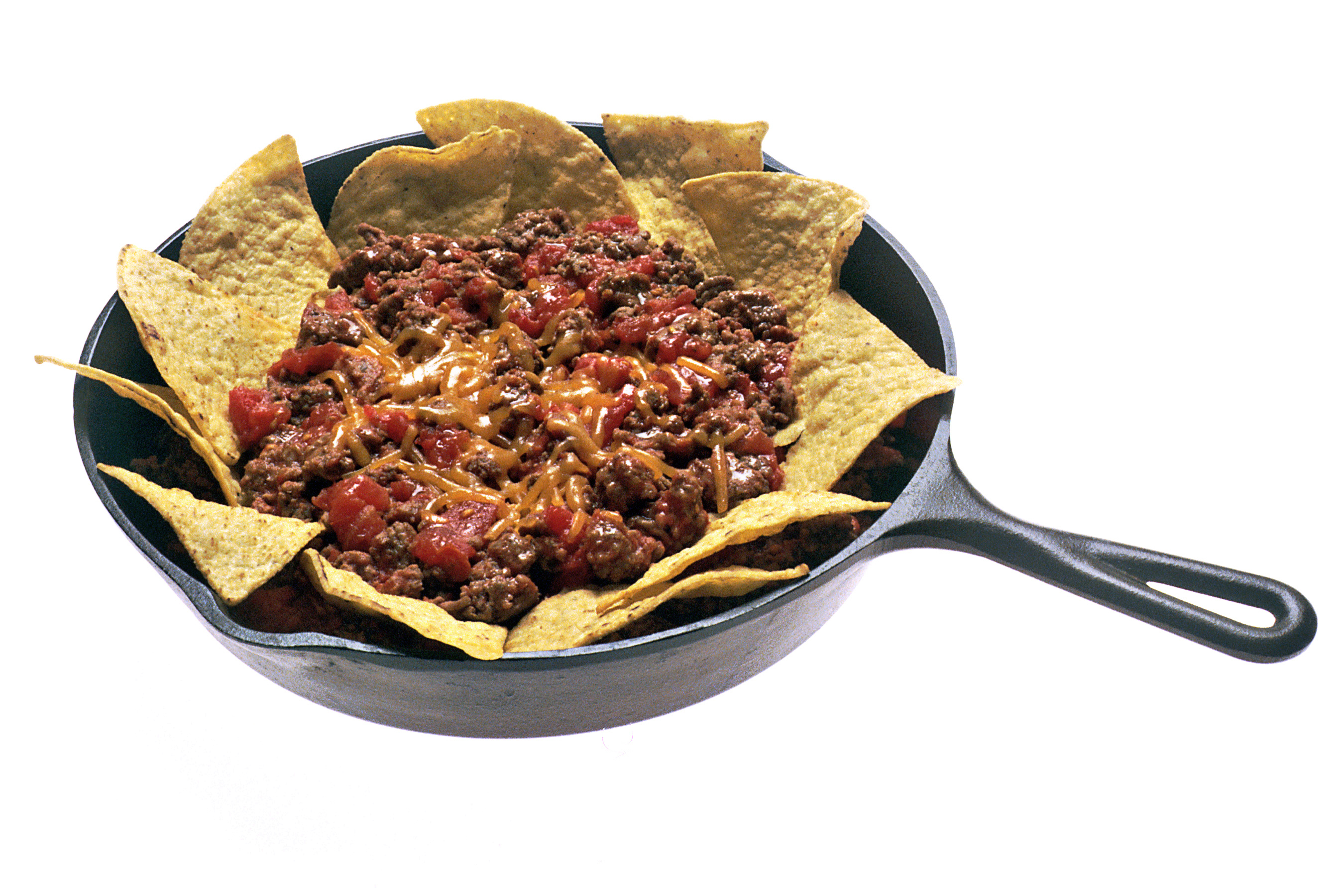
Nachos with beef and beans in a skillet

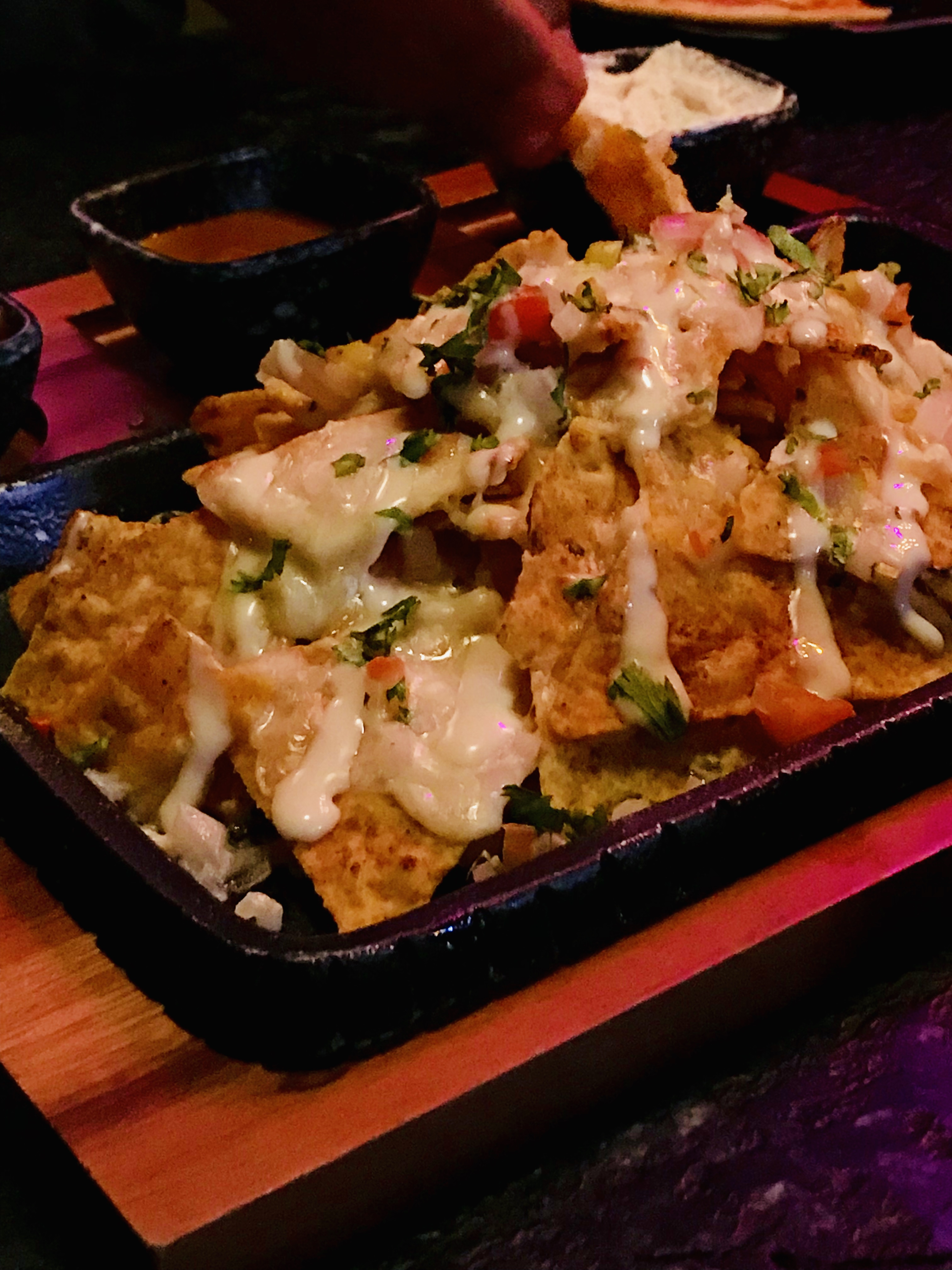
Nachos

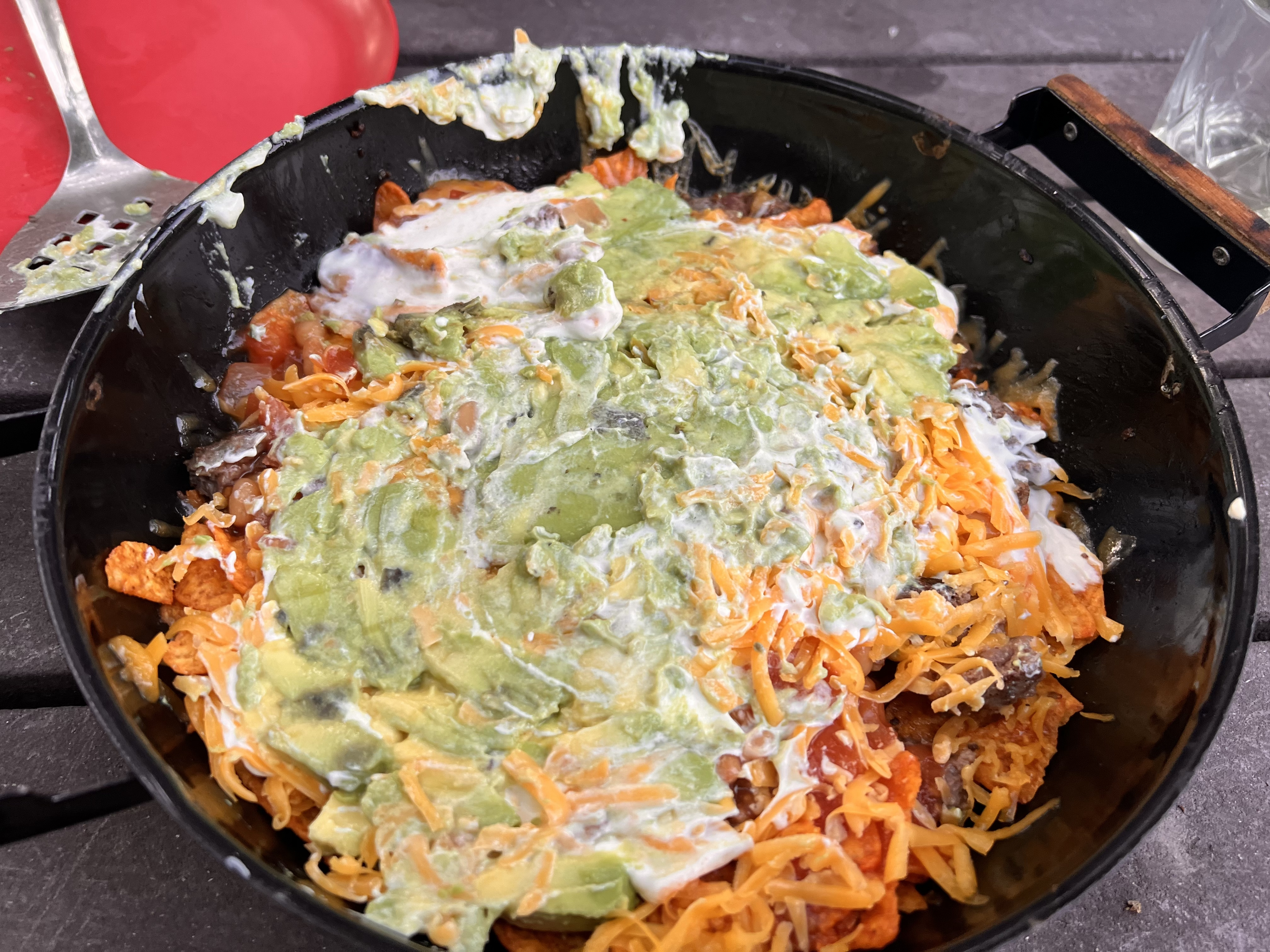
Camping-style nachos made in Bainskloof Pass, South Africa

A variation consists of a quartered and fried tostada topped with a layer of refried beans or various meats and a layer of shredded cheese or nacho cheese, topped with habanero hot sauce.

Other variations include barbecue nachos (in which barbecue sauce is added, sometimes in place of salsa, hot sauce or cheese sauce) and poutine nachos (in which cheddar cheese is replaced with cheese curds and gravy). Although those variations use nontraditional ingredients, these versions are still classified as nachos. In the Southeastern United States, pulled pork nachos, also called barbecue nachos, are very popular. In this variation, the nachos retain their cheese and often jalapeños, but are also topped with pulled smoked pork shoulder served with or without barbecue sauce or hot sauce. Some Irish-themed restaurants and bars serve "Irish Nachos" with toppings placed over potatoes (French fries) instead of tortilla chips. A Pacific Northwestern version of nachos called totchos, or Tot-Chos is a variation in which tortilla chips are replaced with deep-fried or baked tater tots. Although similar, these would not be classified as nachos as they lack tortilla chips, an essential ingredient in nachos.

Traditional nachos consist of the tortilla chips topped with cheese and jalapeños, as done by Anaya. The modern form of nachos has several possible ingredients with the most common toppings being cheese, guacamole, salsa, sour cream, jalapeños, olives, refried beans, ground beef, chicken, and sometimes lettuce. Lettuce is a less common topping, if added at all. Toppings may be served buffet-style to allow diners to create their own nachos. The topping of the greatest quantity is often the cheese.

Nachos vary from the modern style served in restaurants to the quick and easy nachos sold at concession stands in stadiums. The nachos commonly sold at concession stands in the U.S. consists of tortilla chips topped with pump-able cheese sauce. The cheese sauce comes in condensed form to which water or milk and pepper juice are added. What is contained in the condensed form itself is a trade secret. Another variation of nachos is "dessert nachos". These vary widely, from cinnamon and sugar on pita chips to "s'more nachos" with marshmallow and chocolate on graham crackers, and typically refer to a dessert consisting of scattered toppings on some form of crispy base.

== Ingredients ==
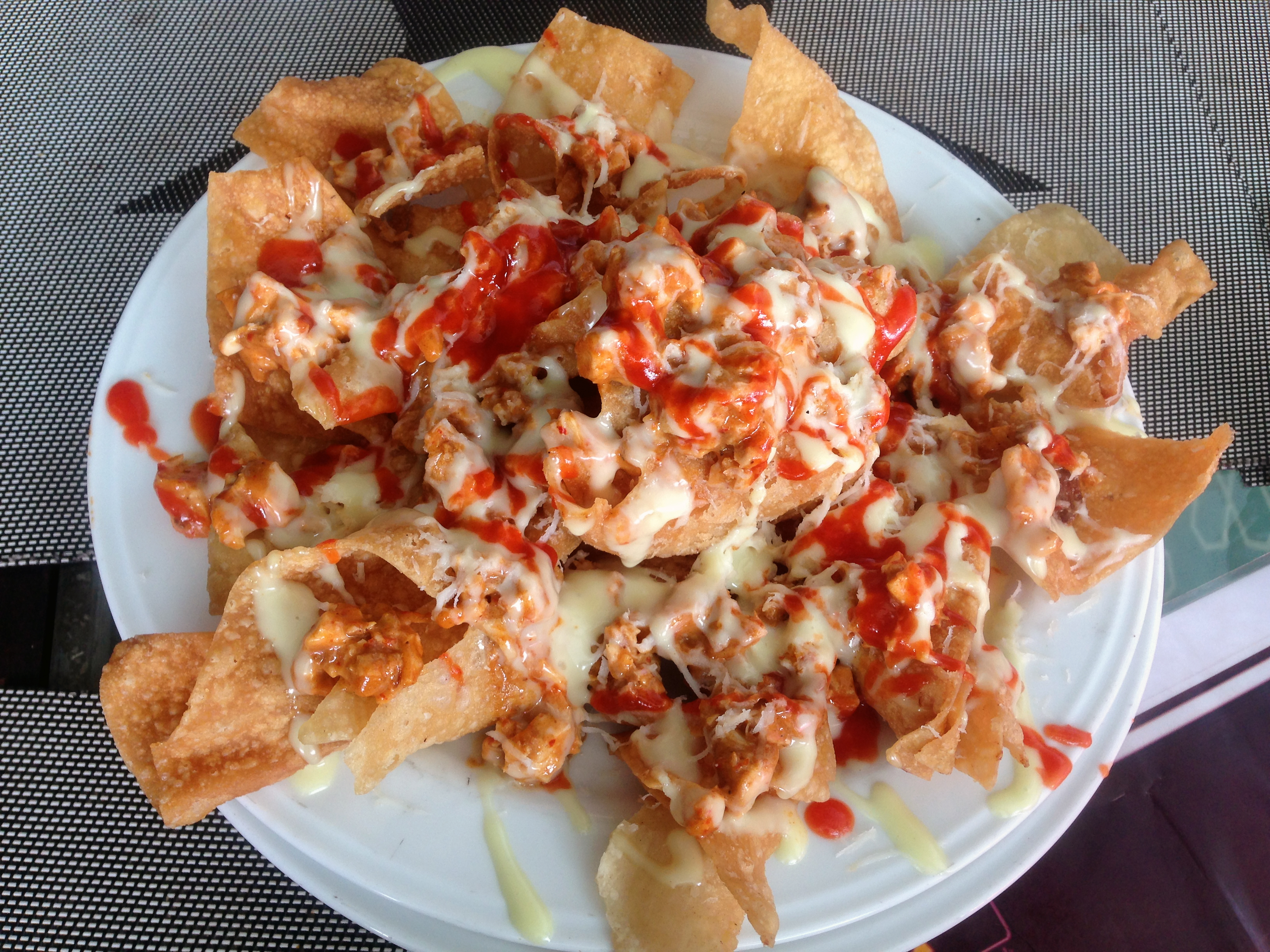
Nachos with tomato sauce

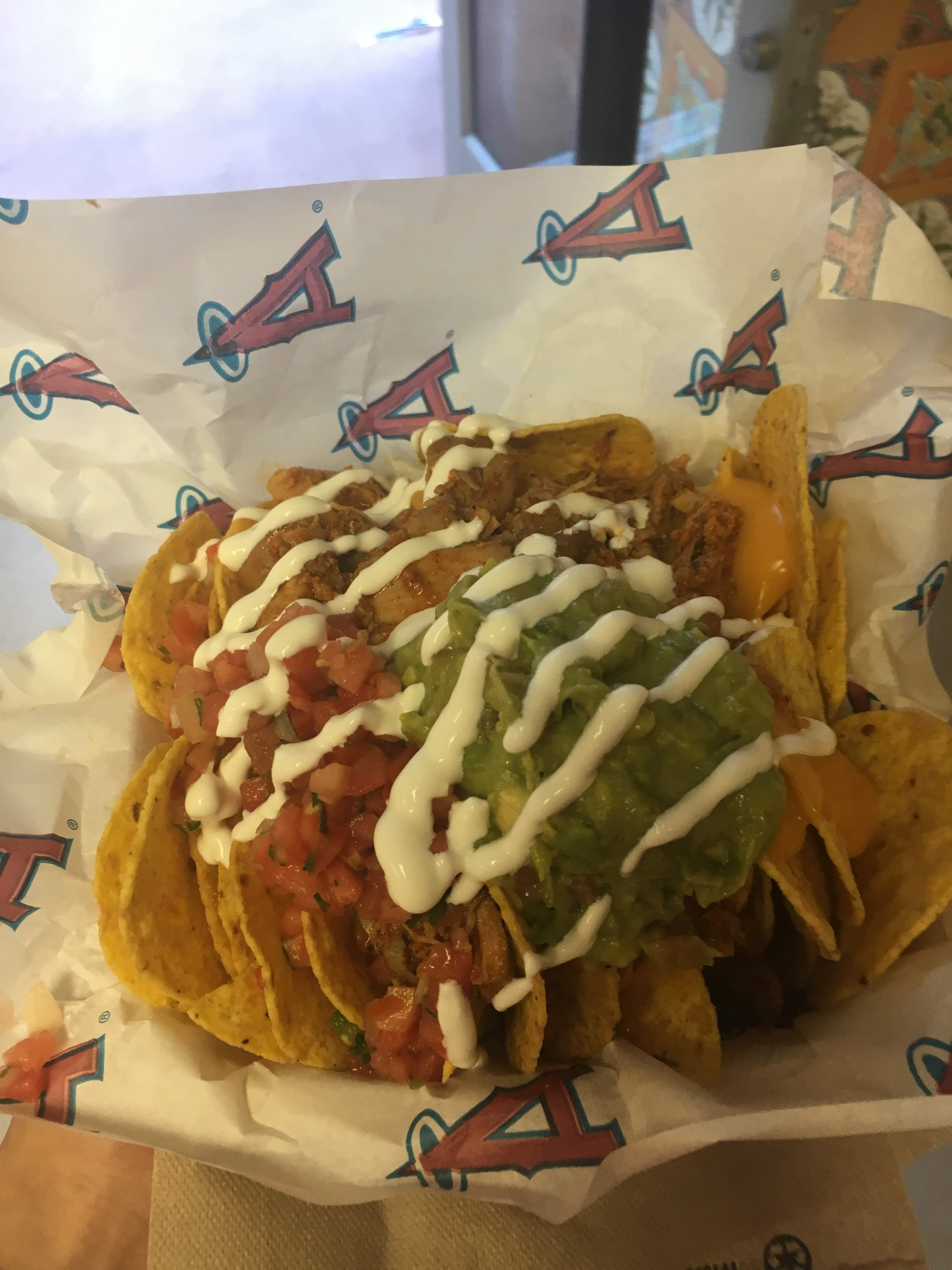
Nachos with chicken, pico de gallo, sour cream, and guacamole

Common toppings include:

- Black beans, pinto beans, or refried beans
- Chile con queso or chili con carne
- Cilantro
- Chives or scallions
- Meat, usually ground beef, sliced steak, chicken, chorizo, or carne asada; occasionally bacon, pepperoni, corned beef, shrimp, or Spam
- Guacamole
- Jalapeño or other Capsicum peppers, or hot sauce
- Lettuce
- Lime
- Olives
- Onions
- Garlic
- Pickles
- Pico de gallo or salsa
- Sour cream
- Salad dressing
- Ranch dressing
- Tomatoes

See also the common cheeses used:

- Processed cheese
- Cheddar cheese
- Mozzarella cheese
- Chihuahua cheese
- Cotija cheese
- Asadero cheese
- Oaxaca cheese
- Swiss cheese
- Provel cheese
- Monterey Jack
- Pepper Jack cheese
- Cheese curd

Nachos with an abundance of toppings are sometimes called "loaded nachos". The term "loaded" occurred during the concept expansion during the following decades back in the 1970s. This type of dish is usually served as an appetizer at bars or restaurants in the United States and elsewhere. Typically, the tortilla chips are arranged on a platter, meat and refried bean toppings are then added, and the entire platter is smothered with shredded cheese. The platter is then put into a broiler or microwave to cause the cheese to melt. The platter is then covered with the cold toppings (shredded lettuce, tomatoes, salsa, jalapeños, etc.) and served immediately.

In Memphis, Tennessee, barbecue nachos are served in most barbecue restaurants and also at sporting events. Barbecued pork shoulder is placed atop tortilla chips, then covered with melted cheese or nacho cheese, barbecue sauce, and sliced jalapeño peppers.

In Hawaii, kalua pork and pineapple nachos are served in many restaurants and bars. Kalua pork and pineapple bits are placed atop tortilla chips, then covered with melted cheese or nacho cheese, and varied toppings.

A similar dish that involves tortilla chips and cheese is found in Tex-Mex restaurants. Small bowls of chile con queso or, more commonly, salsa are served with baskets of warm tortilla chips as appetizers.

=== Nacho cheese ===
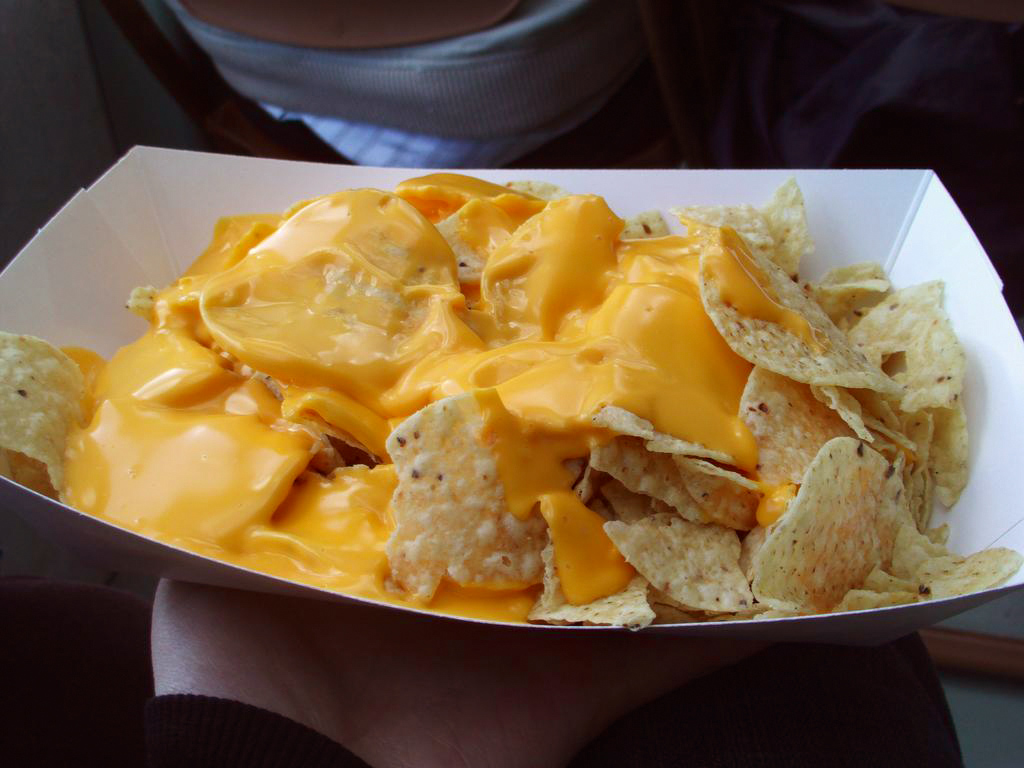
Nachos with a processed cheese sauce (nacho cheese)

A form of processed cheese sauce mixed with peppers and other spices is often used in place of freshly shredded cheese in institutional or large-scale production settings, such as schools, movie theaters, sports venues, and convenience stores, or wherever using freshly grated cheese may be logistically prohibitive. Though originally formulated as a cheaper and more convenient source of cheese to top nachos, this dip has become popular enough in the U.S. that it is available in some Mexican-themed restaurants, and at major grocery stores, in both name-brand (Frito-Lay, Tostitos, and Taco Bell) and unbranded versions.

== In popular culture ==
In the United States, National Nacho Day is celebrated on November 6. The International Nacho Festival is held between October 13 and 15 at Piedras Negras, the birthplace of nachos, and features live music, art, cultural activities, and a contest for the biggest nacho of the world which is registered with the Guinness World Records.

On April 21, 2012, the world's biggest serving of nachos was made by Centerplate at the University of Kansas in Lawrence, Kansas. It weighed 4,689 lb (2,127 kg) and contained 765 lb (347 kg) of nacho chips, 405 lb (184 kg) of salsa, 323 lb (147 kg) of tomato, 918 lb (416 kg) of meat and beans, and more than 2,200 lb (1,000 kg) of cheese.

A new record was set on September 25, 2022, when a 4,870 lb (2,210 kg) plate of nachos was served at a promotional event to celebrate a new season for the revived Beavis and Butt-Head. Paramount+ held the party at an open-air food market in Los Angeles, California. Show creator Mike Judge was present for the event and award presentation and said, "This is the proudest moment of my career." Portions of the food, including leftovers, were packaged and donated to food banks and local homeless shelters.

== See also ==
- Cuisine of California
- List of hors d'oeuvre
- List of maize dishes
- Mexican cuisine
- Nacho Cheese Doritos
- Texan cuisine

== Notes ==
1.In the original published accounts quoting Anaya, Sr., he says that he added the jalapeño before heating them. However, Anaya's son, Ignacio Anaya, Jr., is quoted as saying "My father was maître d' and he said 'Let me go quick and fix something for you.' He went into the kitchen, picked up tostadas, grated some cheese on them—Wisconsin cheese, the round one—and put them under the salamander (a broiling unit that browns the top of foods). He pulled them out after a couple of minutes, all melted, and put on a slice of jalapeño."
