= Tostada (tortilla) =

Flat or bowl-shaped tortilla that is deep-fried or toasted

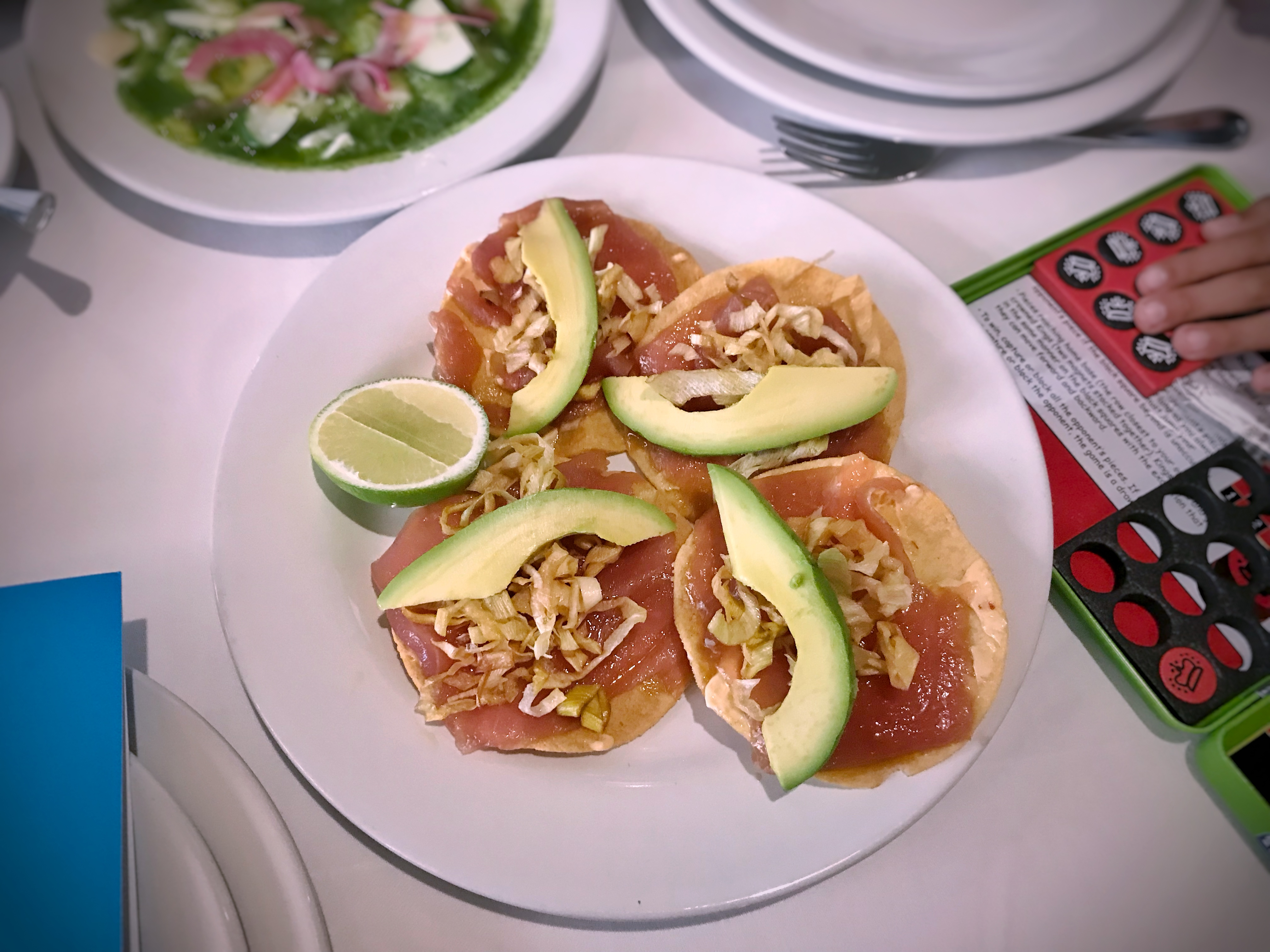
- A tuna tostada dish in a Mexico City restaurant
- Course: Appetizer or snack
- Place of origin: Mesoamerica
- Main ingredients: Tortillas, Vegetables

Tostadas (/tɒˈstɑːdə/ or /toʊˈstɑːdə/; Spanish: [tosˈtaða], lit. 'toasted') are various dishes in Mexican and Guatemalan cuisine based on toasted tortillas.

They are generally a flat or bowl-shaped tortilla that is deep-fried or toasted, but may also be any dish using a tostada as a base. They can be consumed alone, or used as a base for other foods. Corn tortillas are usually used for tostadas, although tostadas made of wheat or other ingredients are also found.

== Preparation ==
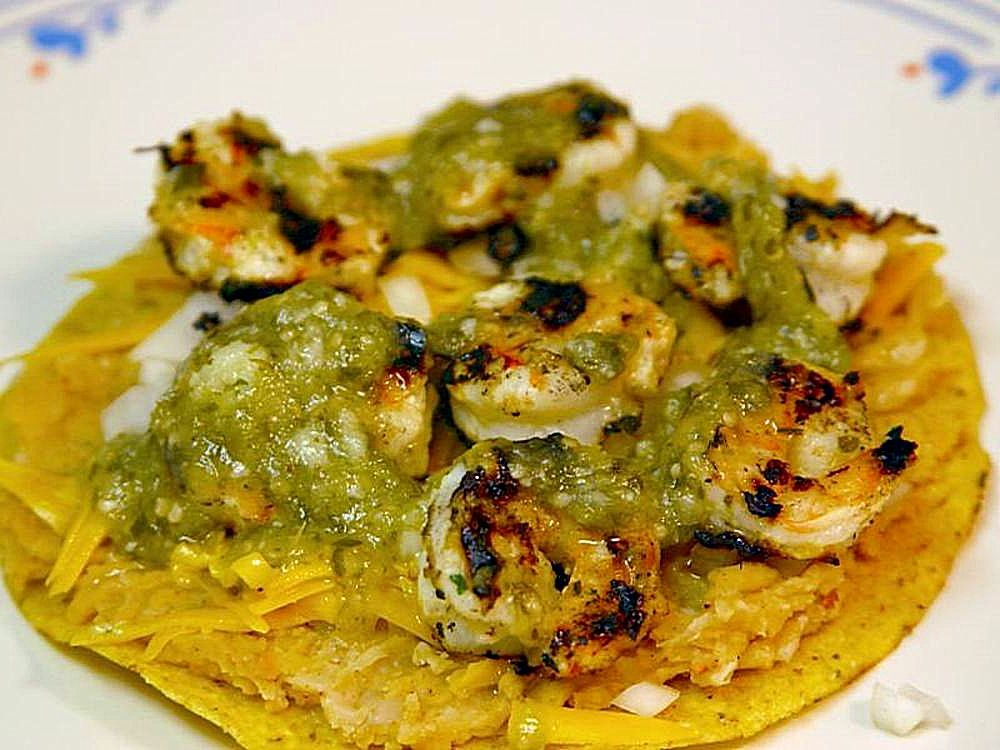
Shrimp tostada

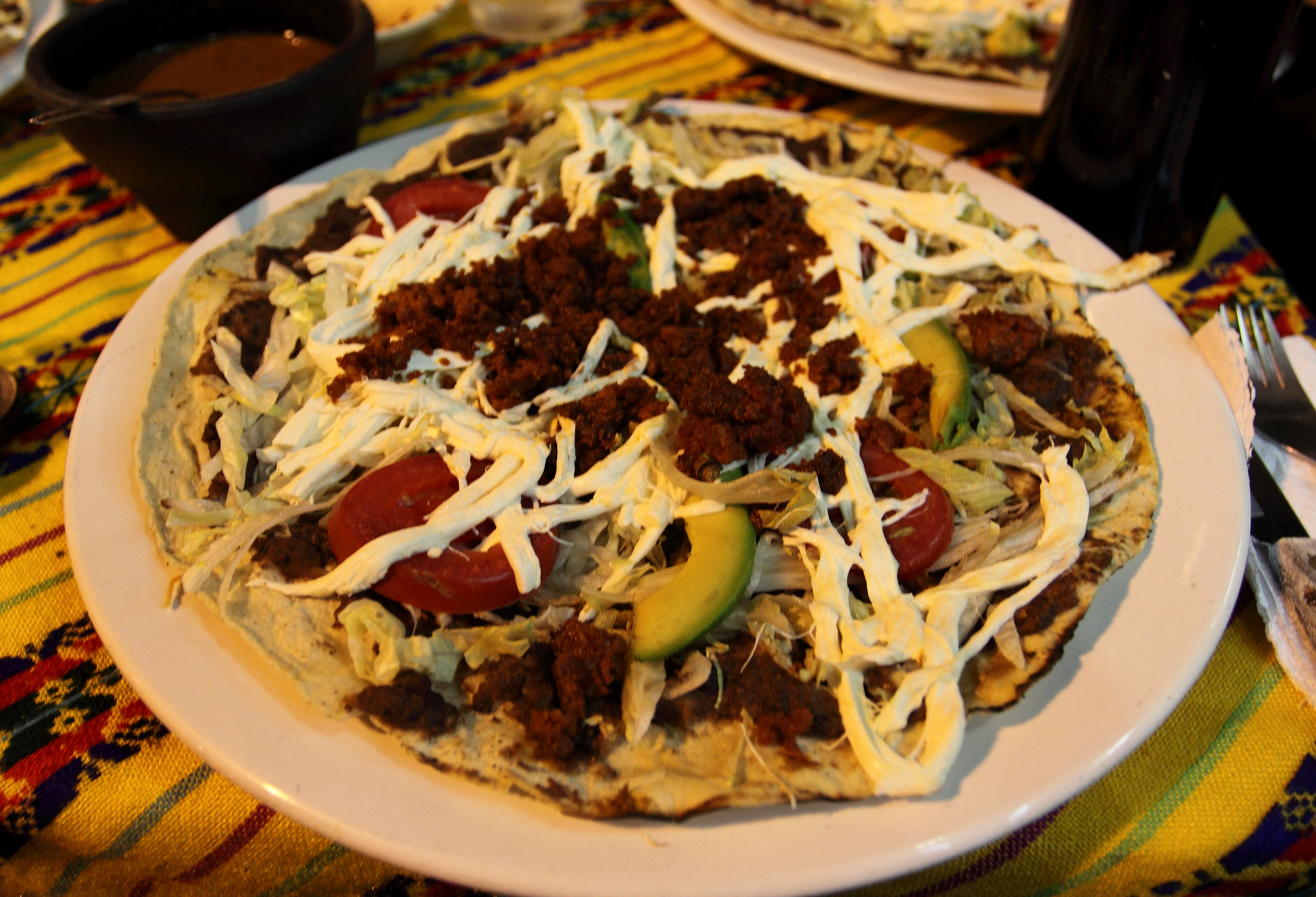
Oaxacan tlayuda

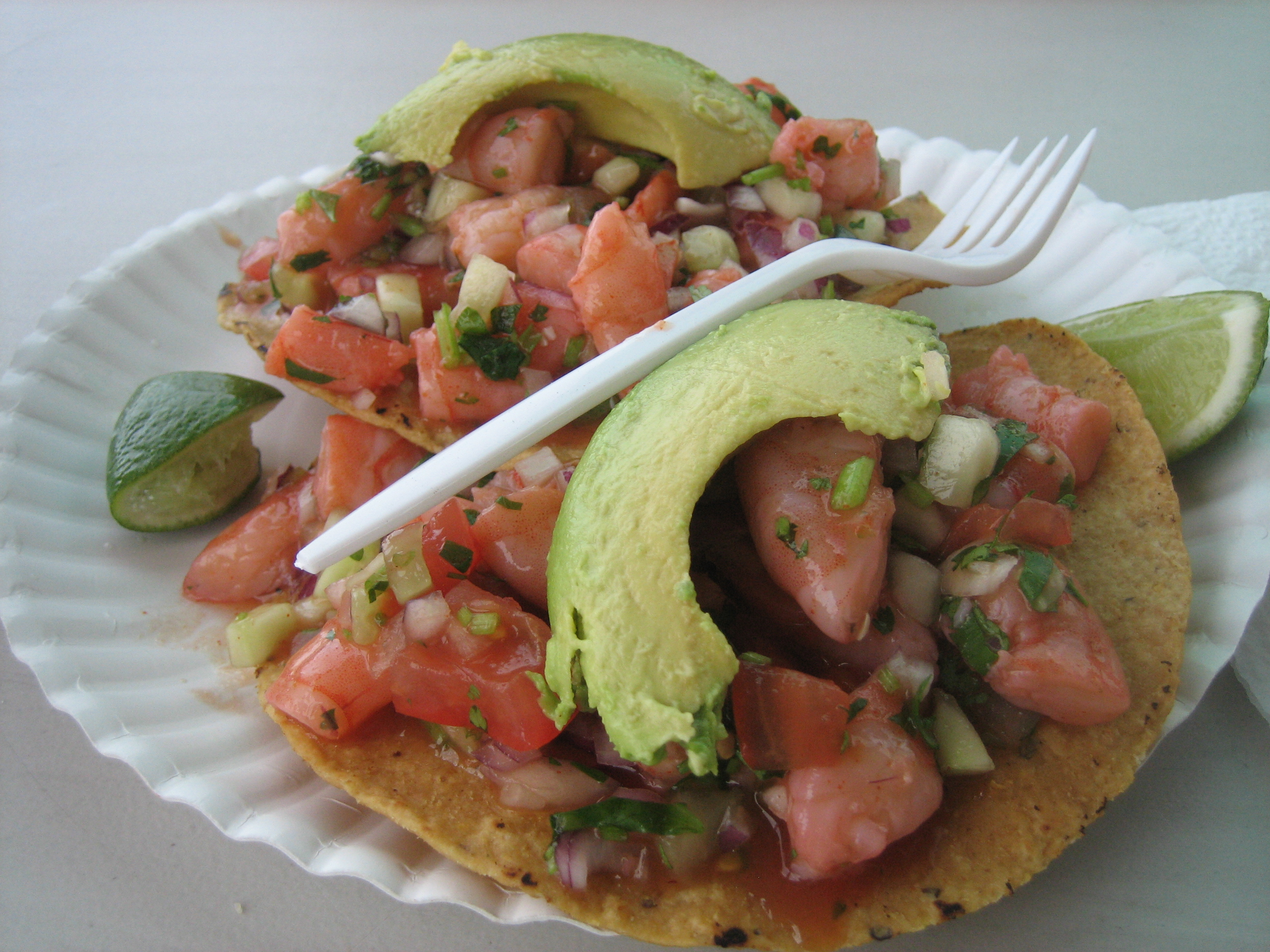
A shrimp tostada, as served by a taco truck in Oakland, California, in the United States

Just as stale bread can be made palatable as toast, a stale tortilla can be repurposed as a tostada by frying it in boiling oil until it becomes golden, rigid, and crunchy. Commercial tostadas are similar in taste and consistency to tortilla chip.

Tostadas are a standalone dish in Mexico and the American Southwest, and are also served as a companion to various Mexican foods, mostly seafood and stews, such as menudo, birria and pozole. Tostadas can be found across Mexico.

Toppings for tostadas are mostly the same as those used for tacos: a base layer of beans, cheese, sour cream, chopped lettuce, sliced onions, and salsa, which is then topped with diced and fried meat, usually chicken or pork, and also beef. They are also popular with seafood such as tuna, shrimp, crab, chopped octopus, and ceviche. Vegetarian tostadas, while not as common, can also be found. Due to the fragile nature of a tostada, the main topping (usually beans or cream) must be pasty enough to stay on; this keeps the other toppings or garnishes from falling off while being eaten. The Oaxaca region is known for its large tlayuda tostada, which is the size of a pizza and sometimes topped with fried chapulines (a variety of grasshopper).

Tostadas can be an appetizer ("botana"), cut into small triangles to make tortilla chips to dip into salsa, guacamole, beans, cream, cream cheese or served with chile con queso. This version of the tostada has its origins both in the totopos de maiz and the New Mexican and Tex-Mex cuisine. Commercial tortilla chips, sometimes known as nachos, are also commonly sold in stores and supermarkets.

In Guatemala, tostadas are often prepared with black beans, parsley, ground beef, and curtido.

== See also ==
- Chalupa, a cup-shaped version of the Mexican tostada
- Taco
- Mexican cuisine
- Guatemalan cuisine
- Tostado
- Garnacha
- List of maize dishes
- Cuisine of California
