= Totopo =

Oaxacan nixtamalized corn flatbread

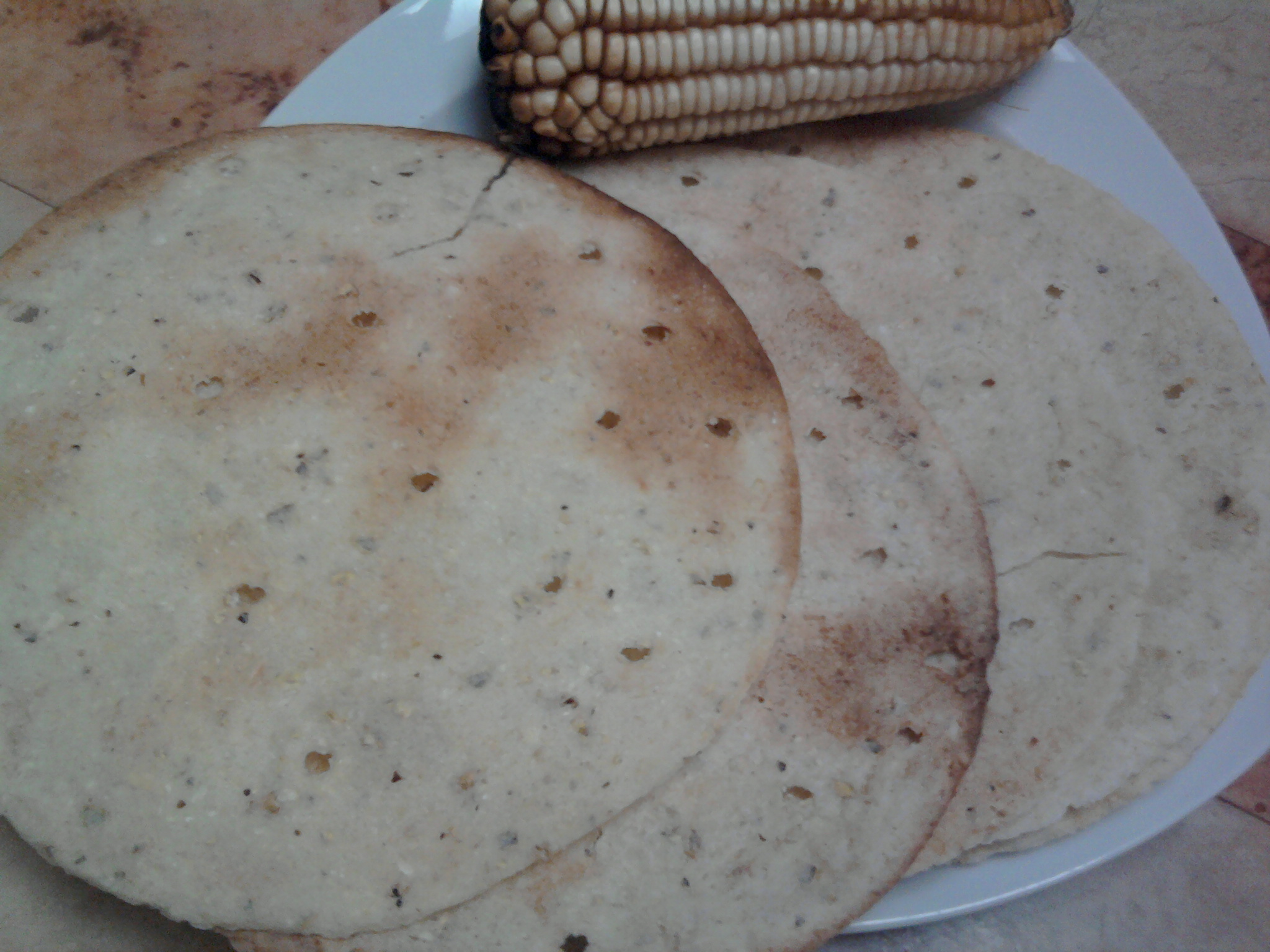
- Place of origin: Mexico
- Region or state: Oaxaca
- Created by: Zapotec peoples
- Main ingredients: Corn masa, salt

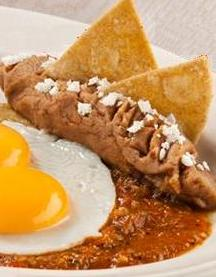
Totopo chips on refried beans

Totopo, in Mexican cuisine, is a flat, round, or triangular corn item similar to a tortilla, that has been toasted, fried or baked, and prepared with nixtamalized corn masa. Totopos are best known as originating from Zapotec peoples of the Isthmus of Tehuantepec region of the Mexican state of Oaxaca. There, the Zapotec women bake totopos in a clay oven known as a comixcal. Totopos resemble a round, baked tortilla chip or certain types of Scandinavian flat bread; however, unlike tortillas, salt is added to the masa and holes are made in the disk prior to baking.

Totopo may also refer to triangular fried tortillas (totopos de maíz), which are essentially tortilla chips. When the whole round tortilla is baked or fried it is generally known as a tostada.

An important feature of the baking and salting process is preservation. To prevent the decomposition of the corn and growth of mold, regular tortillas generally need to be eaten the same day as they are made (or stored cold) due to the moisture content, whereas totopos may be stored for future consumption, in the same manner as dry crackers.

In some cases, fried tortilla chips commercially made both in Mexico and the United States are labeled as or referred to as totopos, although they are not made in the manner of the Oaxacan totopo and are more akin to tortilla chips.

== Etymology ==
The name totopo comes from the Aztec (or Nahuatl) totopochtli, meaning 'toasted thing or thing that crunches when eaten', from the verb totopotza 'to crunch or to toast'. To differentiate the word from other toasted things, sometimes the compound tlaxcaltotopochtli was used, meaning 'toasted tortilla'. The combined word means, approximately, 'tortillas that are noisy to chew'.
