= Chalupa =

Mexican specialty dish

Chalupas
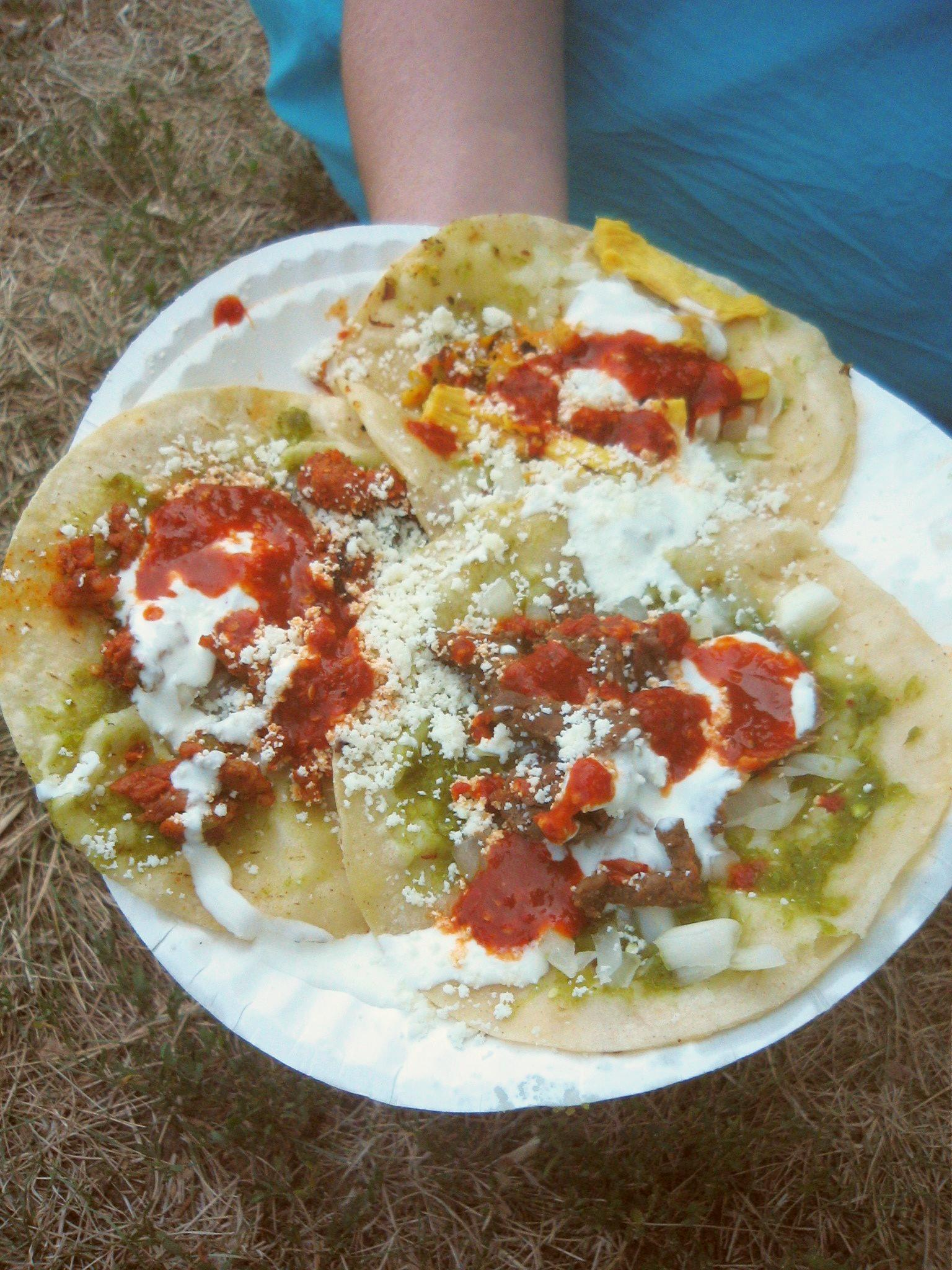
- A plate of chalupas
- Course: Lunch, dinner
- Place of origin: Mexico
- Region or state: Hidalgo, Puebla, Guerrero, and Oaxaca
- Serving temperature: Hot
- Main ingredients: Masa, cheese, lettuce, salsa

A chalupa (Spanish pronunciation: [tʃaˈlupa]) is one of several specialty dishes of south-central Mexico, including the states of Hidalgo, Puebla, Guerrero, and Oaxaca.

== Description ==
Chalupas are made by pressing a thin layer of masa dough around the outside of a small mold, in the process creating a concave container resembling the boat of the same name, and then deep frying the result to produce crisp, shallow corn cups. These are filled with various ingredients such as shredded chicken, pork, chopped onion, chipotle pepper, red salsa, and/or green salsa. They can in many cases resemble tostadas since both are made of a fried or baked masa-based dough.

Traditional chalupas, as found in Cholula, Puebla, are small, thick, boat-shaped fried masa topped only with salsa, cheese and shredded lettuce. Other regions in Mexico add variations, which can include chorizo, pork, shredded chicken, or refried beans, in addition to the classic cheese, salsa, and lettuce toppings. In other instances, the fried masa shape is round, resembling a tostada, with traditional chalupa toppings.

== Regional variations ==
=== Puebla ===
In Puebla, chalupa refers to a dish made with small, flat tortillas which are served soft, rather than concave, crisp masa shells. In other parts of Mexico, this dish is referred to as "chalupa poblana".

=== Hidalgo ===
In Hidalgo, chalupas are normally made with flat fried corn tortillas, and on top is added green chili sauce, potato purée, white cheese, pulled chicken, lettuce and radish.

=== United States ===
The widespread popularity of chalupas across Mexico has also influenced Mexican-style restaurant fare in the neighboring United States. Among notable examples in the US are fast-food versions, which, unlike its Mexican namesake, are fried tortilla shells topped with multiple ingredients. A thicker tortilla shell and multiple toppings have more in common with Navajo frybread and the use of frybread as the basis for a taco than the traditional savory chalupa found in Mexico. Del Taco in Rancho Cucamonga, California has been credited with bringing the chalupa to the United States in the early 1980s. Chalupas were first introduced to the national menu at Taco Bell in 1999.

== See also ==
- List of Mexican dishes
