= Tostado =

Tostado is a Spanish word meaning "toasted". In Ecuador, tostado refers to a fried type of corn grains.

Related concepts include:

- Alonso Tostado, Spanish erudite
- Almudena Cid Tostado, Spanish gymnast
- Edmundo Martínez Tostado, better known as Don Tosti, American musician
- Tostado, Santa Fe, Argentina
- Tostado, sandwiches in Argentina

== See also ==
- Tostada (disambiguation), several kinds of food
