= Ignacio Anaya =

Mexican chef (1895–1975)

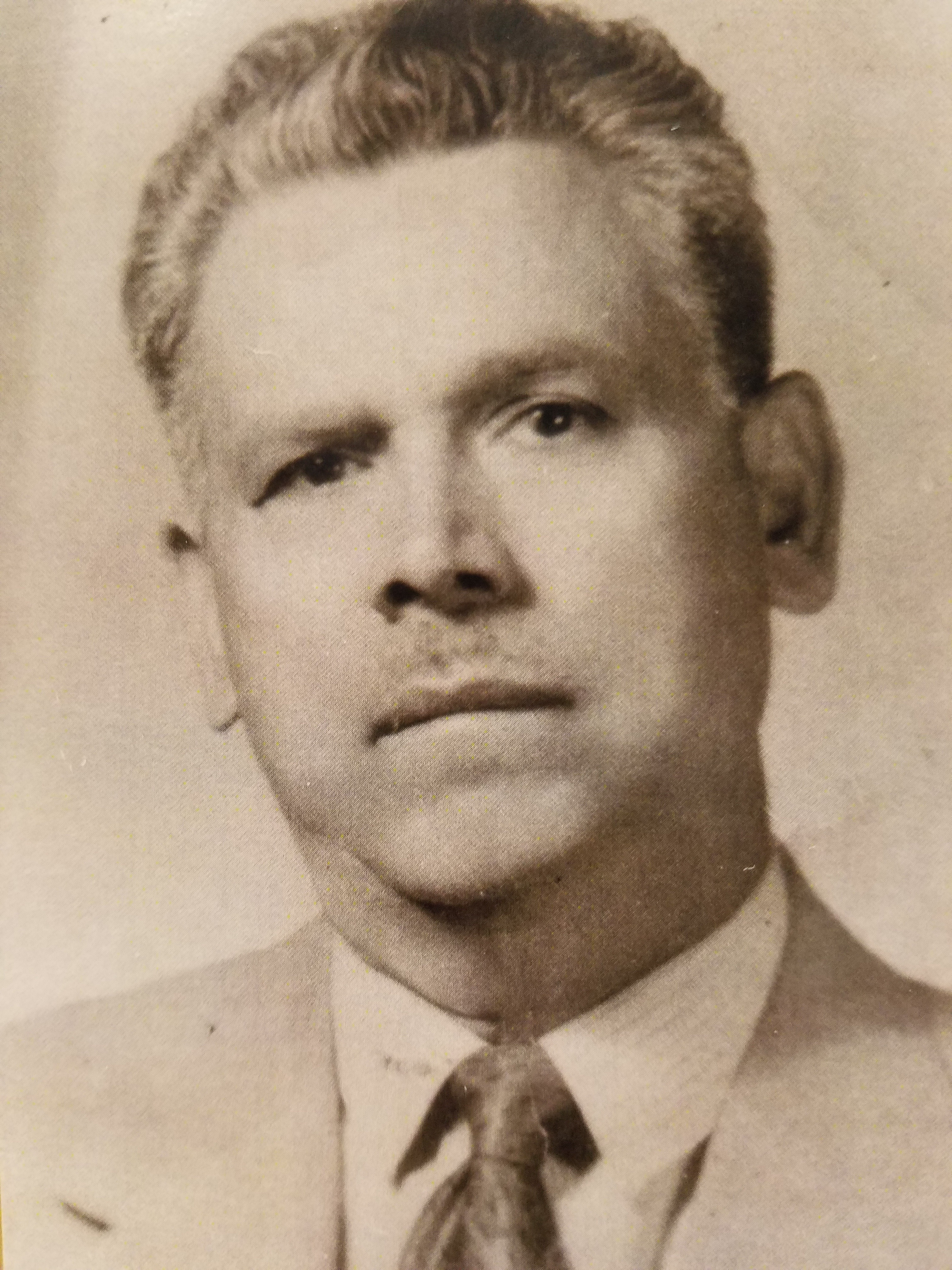
- Born: Ignacio Anaya García; August 15, 1895; Acuña, Coahuila, Mexico
- Died: November 9, 1975 (aged 80); Piedras Negras, Coahuila, Mexico
- Occupations: maître d', restaurateur
- Known for: Inventor of nachos
- Spouse: Marie Antoinette Salinas
- Children: 9

Ignacio Anaya García (August 15, 1895 – November 9, 1975) was a Mexican maître d'hotel who invented the popular Tex-Mex dish nachos at the Victory Club restaurant a couple miles from the border of Texas in Mexico in 1943. After nachos grew in popularity, Anaya was promoted to chef, and he eventually started his own restaurant in the 1960s.

His nickname was Nacho, derived from the Spanish Ignacio, the Spanish version of Ignatius.

== Life and career ==
Born in San Carlos, Manuel Benavides, Chihuahua, Mexico, on August 15, 1895, he worked at the Victory Club restaurant in Piedras Negras, Coahuila, Mexico, a restaurant close to the US border and popular with Americans from a nearby base during World War II. Anaya created nachos while working there one day in 1943 when a group of US Army wives entered and the chef was nowhere to be found. As recounted by his son:

My father was maître d' and he said "Let me go quick and fix something for you." He went into the kitchen, picked up tostadas, grated some cheese on them—Wisconsin cheese, the round one—and put them under the salamander (a broiling unit that browns the top of foods). He pulled them out after a couple of minutes, all melted, and put on a slice of jalapeño.

— Ignacio Anaya Jr.

The dish became so popular, the owner of the Victory Club, Roberto de los Santos, put his creation on the menu as Nacho's Especiales. When the Victory Club closed in 1961, Anaya opened his own restaurant, Nacho's Restaurant, in Piedras Negras.

Anaya married Marie Antoinette Salinas, with whom he had 9 children.

== Death and legacy ==
Anaya died on November 9, 1975, leaving a son, Ignacio Anaya Jr., who went into banking, and five other surviving children. Posthumously, he was honored with a bronze plaque in Piedras Negras. To celebrate Anaya's invention, the city of Piedras Negras holds a three-day Nacho Fest every year around October 21, the International Day of the Nacho.

Smithsonian Magazine ranked nachos as a sports stadium favorite in 1976, following the invention of a processed cheese sauce by Frank Liberto. Howard Cosell added to the popularity of nachos during a September 4, 1978 NFL game by weaving "nachos" into his commentary. Although the original nachos contained only three ingredients, nachos can now be found with a wide variety of toppings.

On August 15, 2019, Google honored Anaya with a Doodle celebrating what would have been his 124th birthday.
