= History of the tortilla =

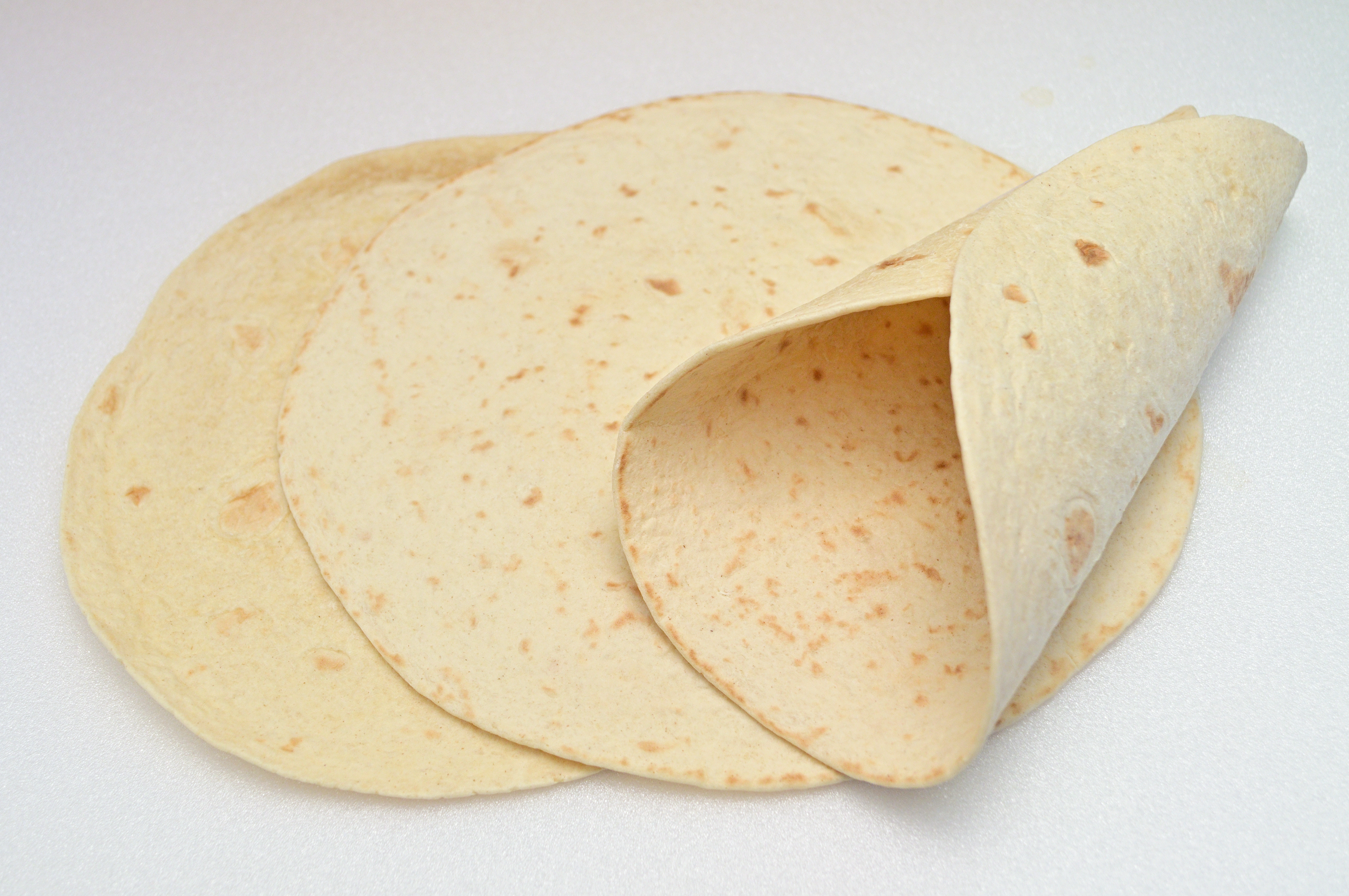
Tortillas

The earliest type of tortilla is the corn tortilla, originating in the ancient societies of Mesoamerica. Corn (maize) was the main staple of these societies since its cultivation in the 6th millennium BC; they developed the process of nixtamalization to produce masa, a dough that would become the basis of corn tortillas. It is unknown when tortillas originated, but they became popular with the development of civilizations, such as the Oaxaca Valley in 500–100 BC. They became a central dish of Aztec cuisine by the time of the Aztec Empire. Aztec influence may have popularized the tortilla among the Maya, among whom tortillas were previously not present.

Wheat was introduced to Mesoamerica during the Spanish conquest of the Aztec Empire, which began with the arrival of Hernan Cortés in 1519. The Spanish began eating wheat loaf bread while the indigenous population ate corn tortillas. The Spanish territory of New Spain (later Mexico) expanded northward into regions including Sonora. Settlers of Northern Mexico began eating flour tortillas made of wheat grown in the region, creating a regional division between wheat and corn tortillas. Mexican populations in Texas and in California were displaced by Americans in the 19th century, but tortillas remained common in these areas. Corn tortillas also increased in consumption among indigenous Mexicans, despite views of the Porfirio Diaz administration opposing them.

After the end of the Mexican Revolution in 1920, electrification made tortilla making more efficient, and workers in cities began purchasing tortillas from tortillerias. The tortilla became a national symbol of Mexico around this time and became popular among the urban middle class. Tortilla machines for industrial production gained widespread use in the 1950s, although there had been earlier attempts. This change was marked by the use of dried masa flour, or masa harina, which was produced by two Mexican firms: Maseca and the state-owned Minsa. Government policies known as "Tortilla Welfare" promoted the use of masa harina for its efficiency.

The tortilla industry grew in the late 20th century as technology decreased production costs. The industry saw significant growth in the United States amid the growing popularity of Mexican cuisine in the country. As Mexico's economy shifted to neoliberalism, corporations such as Gruma (the parent of Maseca) saw the most growth. Tortilla prices in Mexico increased as the government lifted subsidies and the corn industry became globalized. In 2007, protests against high prices culimated in the Tortilla Price Stabilization Pact. The popularity of tortillas increased worldwide in the early 21st century, reaching Europe and Asia, but decreased in Mexico.

== Pre-Columbian Mesoamerica ==
=== Origin ===
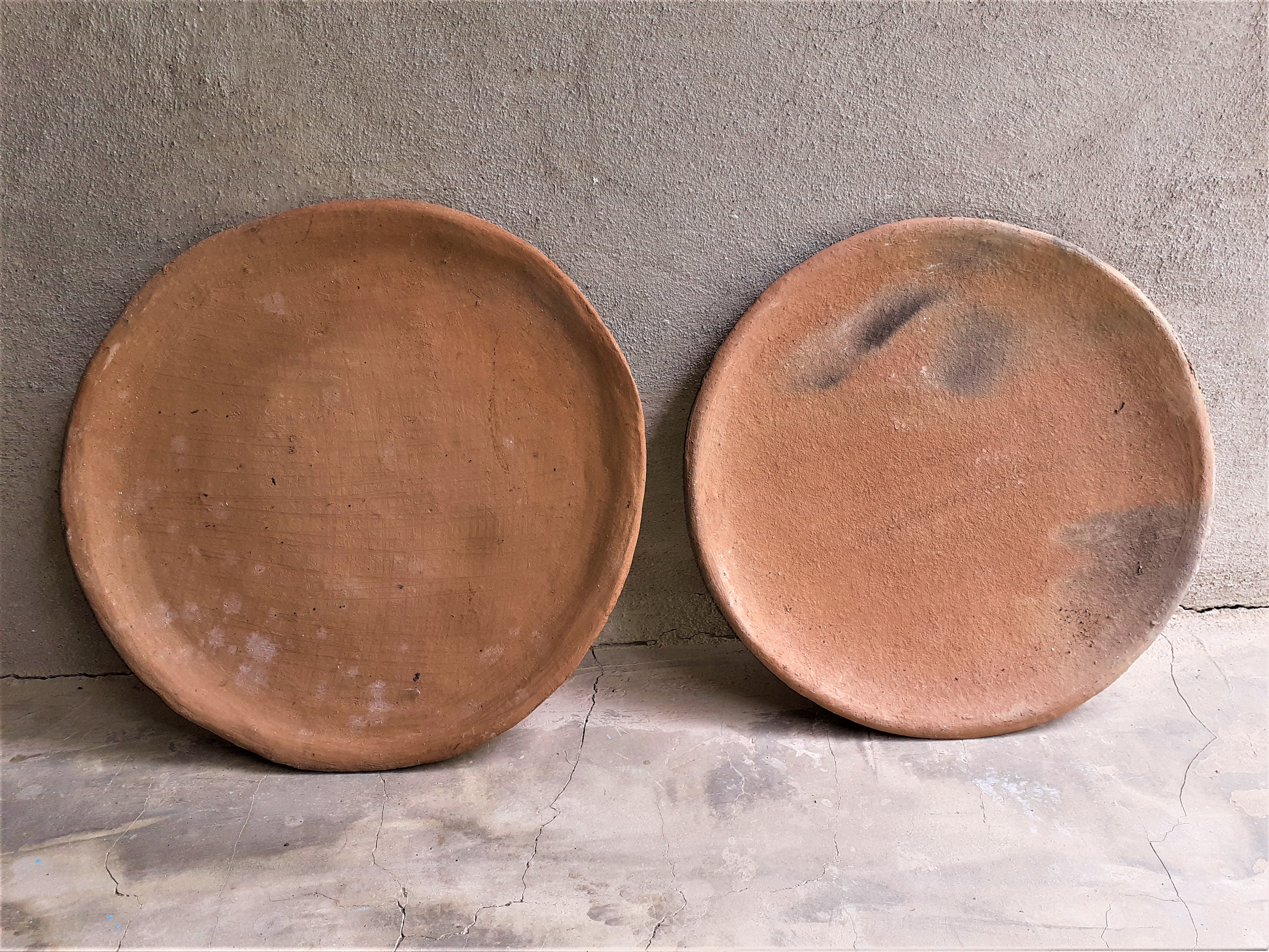
The comal is a design associated with the tortilla.

The history and culture of the tortilla is connected with that of corn (maize); the corn tortilla is the oldest form of tortilla. Corn was first cultivated by the 6th millennium BC, an adaptation of the crop teosinte. It became the main staple food for all the ancient societies of Mesoamerica, and its cultivation was a major factor in the development of civilizations in the region. This grain became ingrained in the religions and lifestyles of these civilizations. Some Mesoamerican creation myths, such as the one described in the Mayan Popol Vuh, saying that humans were created from corn. Early forms of tortillas may have originated as soon as maize was cultivated.

In early Mesoamerica, most foods involved nixtamalization, the process of treating corn with alkaline limewater. (Note: Nixtamalization improves nutrition by enabling niacin to be digested. This must have been important in the success of civilizations; societies that relied on corn without nixtamalization suffered from malnutrition.) Earlier societies performed this process using wood ash; the development of using lime was possibly to improve taste. Early Mesoamerican cultures used stone metates to grind masa, or nixtamalized corn. This would become the basis of tortillas and several other dishes, including tamales.

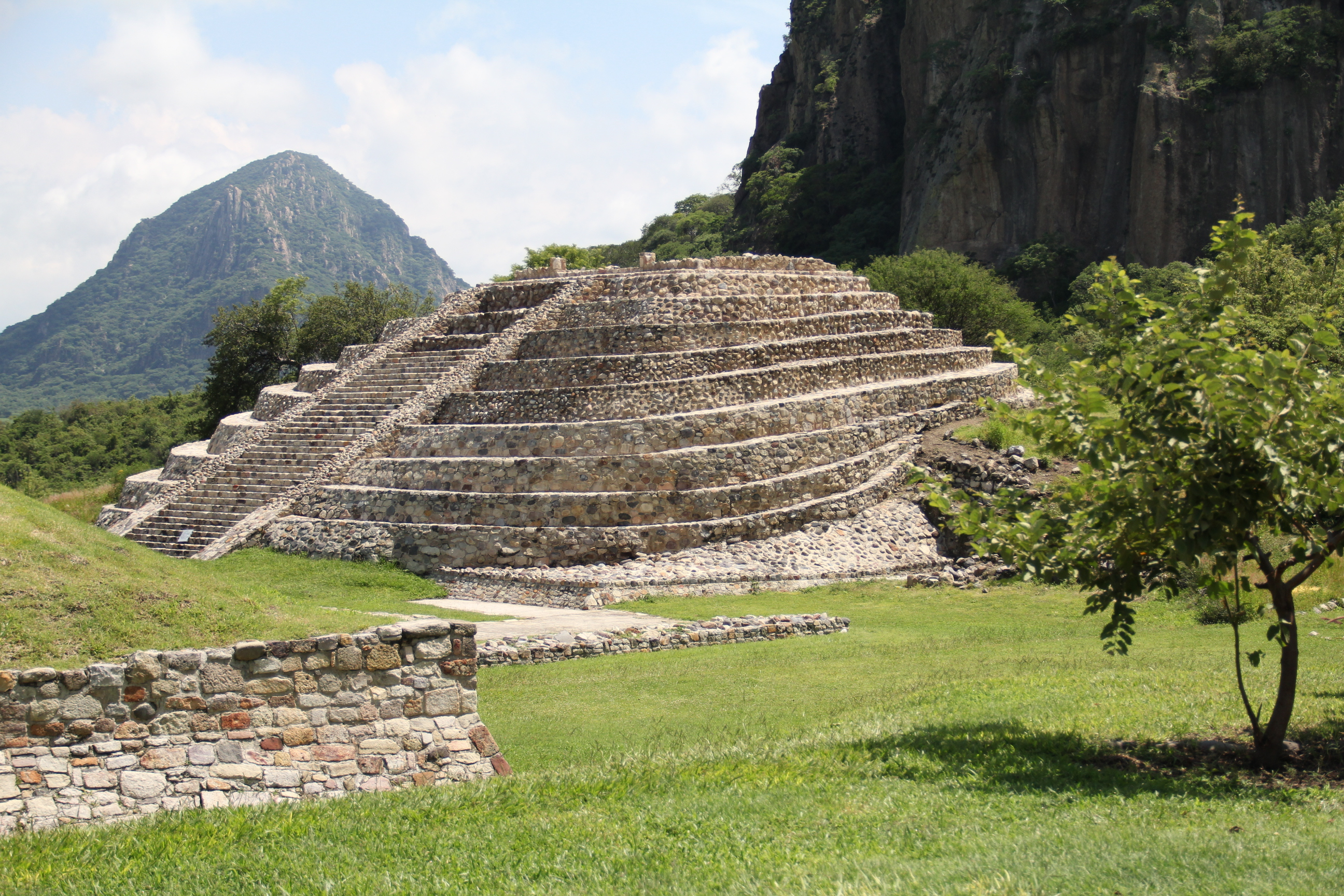
The site of Chalcatzingo

The exact origin of tortillas is unknown. The first versions may have been baked against hot stones. Archaeologically, tortillas are associated with the presence of the comal, a clay griddle, which may have been designed for optimal tortilla baking but could have been used for other foods. (Note: Archaeologists have excavated potsherds of comals at various sites, dated to 500–300 BC in the Oaxaca Valley and to 200–650 AD in the Valley of Mexico (including Teotihuacan).. At Teotihuacan, the presence of comals was accompanied by a shift in the design of metates that may have made it easier to grind nixtamal.) Remnants of a comal and processed lime dating to circa 700 BC were discovered by archaeologist David Grove at the site of Chalcatzingo in the state of Morelos, the earliest likely evidence of tortillas.

Aztec folklore states that the tortilla was invented by a peasant for a king who was visiting his village. Working quickly, the peasant roughly shaped some masa and cooked it on a stone slab before salting it and serving it to the king. One Maya folktale states that a king, to choose his wife, held a contest for the best idea to serve the Maya people. A peasant who loved the king received a divine vision of the tortilla, which won the king's affection.

Tortillas were a development of complex societies such as city-states, requiring time-intensive labor; tools such as pots, strainers, grinders, and griddles; and reliable sources of corn, limewater, and fuel. They became a convenient and palatable food that could easily be carried by workers. It is likely that these cultures prepared tortillas in roughly the same way as they are prepared thousands of years later; there is no archaeological evidence that the process changed. (Note: At a Zapotec site dating to around 1100, near the modern town of Macuilxóchitl, Oaxaca, archaeologist Ronald Fauseit discovered a kitchen very similar to the design used for tortillas by the area's modern Zapotec residents.)

=== In Mesoamerican cultures ===
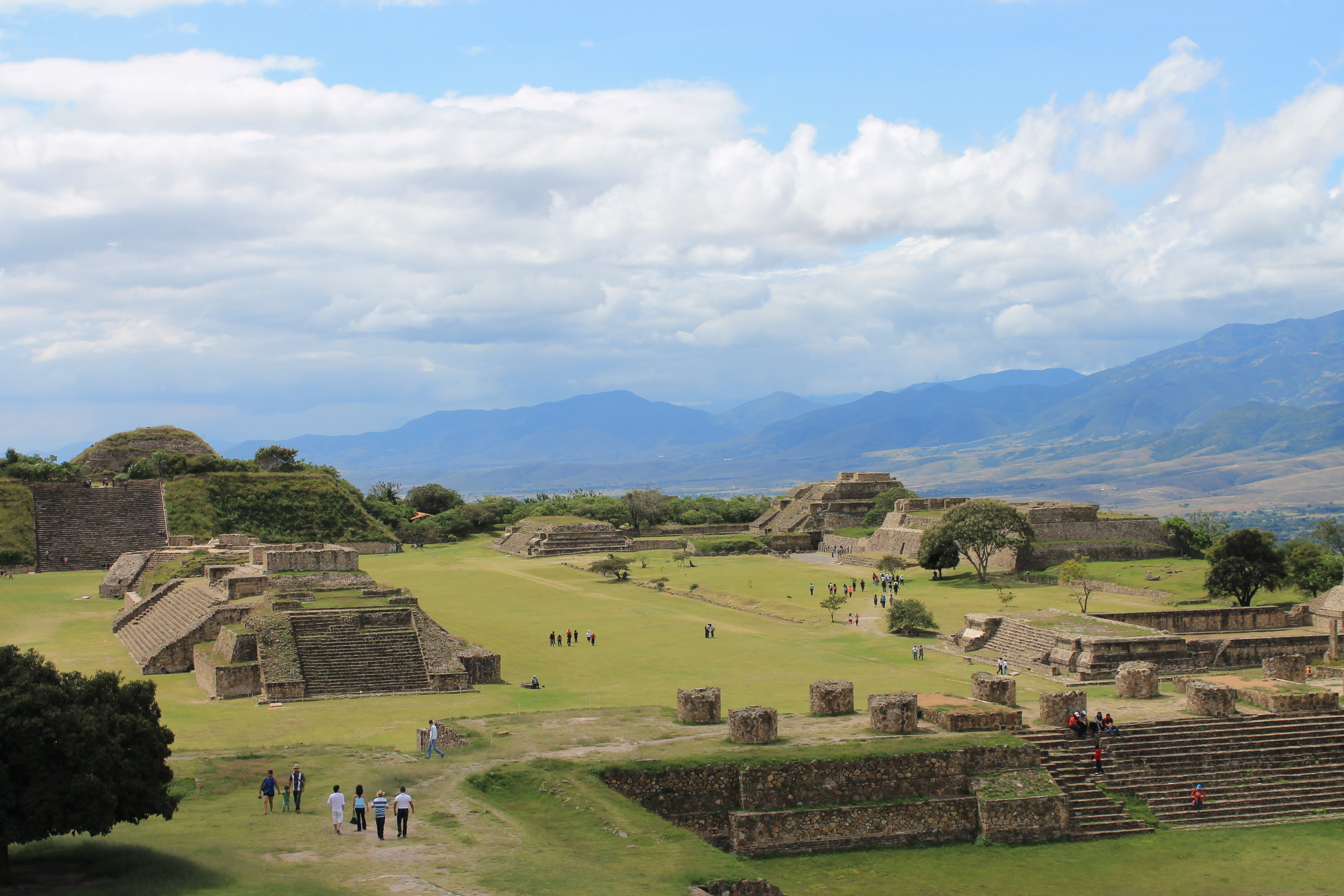
The site of Monte Albán

Tortillas became more common as more people lived in settlements with agriculture. In the Oaxaca Valley, which experienced economic and population growth around 500–100 BC, tortillas may have become popular as people spent more time outside the house; archaeological findings of comales are concentrated around the Monte Albán, a capital city during this era. As farmers began working beyond the household, they packed tortillas for lunch, folded around beans or game meat for an early form of taco. The Aztecs were initially nomadic and created simple tortillas without nixtamalization before they established cities such as Tenochtitlán.

Tortillas became one of the main foods in Mesoamerica during the Classic period, which began in 300 BC. Making tortillas, like other foods, was generally women's work. (Note: Records of tortilla making as women's work date back to 16th-century codices.) They were prepared daily as tortillas do not last long. Ancient Mesoamericans made tortillas with a diameter of about eight fingers, with their thickness varying to paper-thin. They used various types of corn—white, yellow, blue, brown, or purple. They ate them with beans or chile sauce. The Aztecs also created a food similar to tortilla chips, totopotchli, consisting of wedges of tortillas toasted on a griddle for increased shelf life. Other tortilla-like foods, including totopos, tlayudas, tlacoyos, and memelas, were found in various regions of ancient Mesoamerica.

The Maya did not make tortillas during the Classic period, instead using masa for tamales. Archaeological findings from the region are dominated by pots, with almost no evidence of comals. (Note: There is evidence of tortilla production at the Maya town of Kaminaljuyu, dating to the Early Classic period. It is possible that this was due to influence from Teotihuacan. A bowl found at Kaminaljuyu has an image of tortillas in the artistic style of Teotihuacan.) Tortillas are not mentioned in texts of the Maya script (Note: The word wah, which refers to tortillas in modern Maya languages, appears in ancient texts, but it could have referred to other foods.) or depicted in undisputed Maya sculptures. Tortillas were introduced to the Maya much later, likely by migrants from Central Mexico. (Note: It has been theorized that the Maya did not have tortillas before the Spanish conquest. Evidence against this theory, according to anthropologist E. N. Anderson, is that the Maya make tortillas quite differently from Central Mexicans.)

Tortillas were associated with occasions such as birthdays and religious festivals. They held religious significance as corn was sacred. In one Maya tribe, tortillas were put in graves, believing that the spirits of dogs that were eaten by humans would wish to enact revenge, but would instead eat the tortillas. The Classic-period Zapotec also buried their dead with tortillas and other foods such as cacao.

=== Aztec Empire era ===
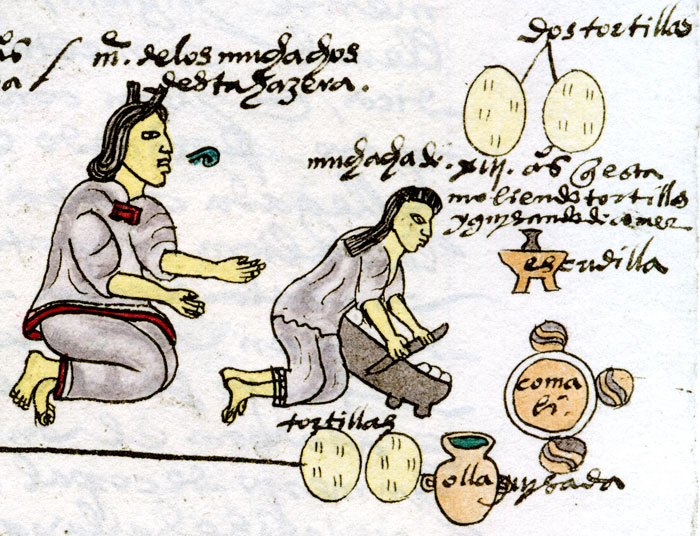
Depiction of tortilla makers in the Aztec Codex Mendoza

Tortillas were important in the Aztec Empire, as documented in many Aztec records. The popularity of tortillas in this era may have been associated with a demand for portable food. They were also faster to prepare than other foods. Tortilla vendors arose in the Aztec era, perhaps serving visitors from beyond the city as well as households that wanted to spend less work and fuel on cooking. As annual tribute from the city-state of Tepeacac, Tenochtitlán received enough corn and lime to regularly produce tortillas. Tortillas featured in Aztec poetry and ceramic art, while the Codex Mendoza depicted the use of the comal for tortilla baking.

In Aztec cuisine, a typical meal included tortillas, a bean dish, and a sauce. The proper way to eat a tortilla was to gently fold it and take multiple bites. Aztec girls learned to make tortillas before they were fifteen. Aztec culture created a dichotomy between good cooks, who could create tortillas of various sizes, shapes, and flavors, and bad cooks, whose tortillas were salty, sour, or smoky. Servings of tortillas for children were strictly based on age, receiving half a tortilla at age 3, one from age 4, one and a half from age 6, and two from age 13. (Note: It is not clear what size of tortilla this rule referred to.) Housewives believed that, if a tortilla folded while baking or got accidentally knocked over, it signalled the arrival of a visitor or a husband returning from travelling.

Tortillas were eaten by all social classes of Tenochtitlán. Peasant families made tortillas every day; they ate it with mole using three fingers of the right hand. Street food vendors at marketplaces sold tortillas with ingredients such as squash, nopales, and amaranth seeds, as well as tacos with scrambled turkey eggs, a street food for the wealthy. Vendors of good tortillas were associated with the virtue of discipline, and fallen crumbs were picked up by young boys to avoid waste and divine retribution. Warriors brought tortillas to battle, as described by a chronicler of the siege of Coyohuacan.

Some types of tortillas were created for Aztec nobility and emperors. Nobles regularly ate versions including cuauhtlacualli, which were large and thick; hueitlaxcalli, which were thin; totanquil tlaxcalli, which were folded; tlacepoalli tlaxcalli, which were multi-layered; elotlaxcalli, made of soft corn; and iztac tlaxcalli etica tlaoyo, made of white corn and beans. The last independent Aztec emperor, Moctezuma II, ate variations including quauhtlaquallis, which were large and thick, and tlacuelpachollis, which were very thin and made of white corn, as well as tortillas made with eggs or shaped like butterflies or leaves. A version uniquely prepared for him and the nobility was made of red corn, linseed flowers, and various medicinal herbs and roots.

Tortillas frequently featured in Aztec religious practices. The Aztecs believed that tortillas had souls. Peasant households had idols of Huehueteotl, the god of fire, to which they offered pieces of tortilla with every meal. Tortillas and poultry were offered to Quetzalcoatl to pray for the coming of the wet season. Tortillas mixed with tamales, beans, and honey were eaten to honor the god Xipe Totec, while tortillas made of green corn and amaranth were eaten to honor the goddess Chicomecōātl. Aztec temples hung pieces of tortillas from strings to be used as offerings, and temple priests wore S-shaped tortillas around their necks. Priests offered a basket of five tortillas topped with a frog during feasts of Centeōtl, god of corn, and holy virgins prepared very light tortillas or tortillas shaped like hands and feet as offerings to Huītzilōpōchtli. Human sacrifices were compared to tortillas that fed Huītzilōpōchtli. To prepare for sacrifices priests used dried tortillas to act out a sacrifice on the victim. (Note: Bernardino de Sahagún also observed children who, before being killed as sacrifices to Tlaloc, staged an imaginary sacrifice using a dried tortilla.) Healers treated sick children by placing one and a half green corn tortillas on their chests. During Aztec fasts, tortillas were made without nixtamal.

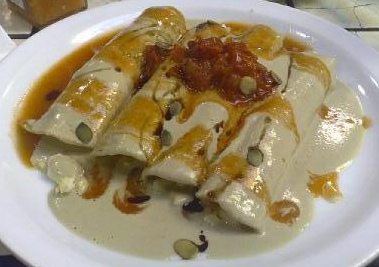
Papadzules were eaten by the Maya during the Aztec era.

As the Maya city-states saw Aztec influence, tortillas became as important as tamales. The Maya of the Yucatán ate tortillas with beans and chile sauce for dinner, their only solid meal. They also created the dish papadzules, resembling enchiladas. The Zapotec of Oaxaca ate tortillas with meat or fish. The Mixtec city of Tututepec, also in Oaxaca, had high tortilla production, as indicated by the archaeological presence of comals. Its people ate tortillas on their own or to pick up beans, vegetables, or, less commonly, meat. Meanwhile, the Otomi of Central Mexico built rituals around corn. They painted tortillas for ceremonies. Initially using imagery from their religion, they would use Catholic imagery after converting during the Spanish era. This tradition is still observed by the contemporary Otomi.

== Colonial era ==
=== Spanish conquest ===
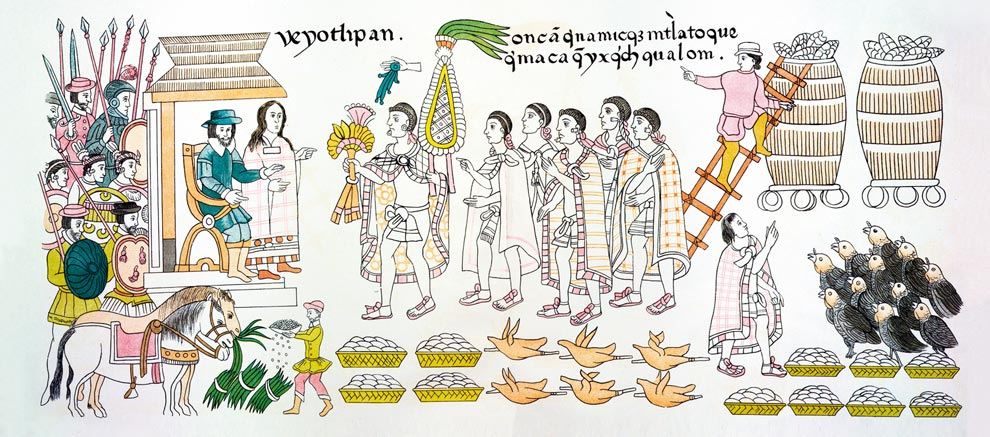
Hernan Cortés (seated) receiving tortillas and other gifts from the Aztecs

The Spanish conquest of the Aztec Empire began when Hernan Cortés, a conquistador, came to Mexico in 1519. Upon his arrival, Moctezuma gave them gifts, introducing them to tortillas and other foods. Moctezuma's ambassador, Teoctlamacazqui, greeted Cortés and his troops with white corn tortilla dishes, otherwise eaten by lords, and gave tortillas to the horses before being informed that they ate grass. Cortés tried various tortillas, served with beans or axayacatl bugs, but considered them inferior to European-style loaf bread. As Cortés's troops went further into the country, their primary subsistence was tortillas, which villagers gave them. Cortés introduced the term tortilla, replacing tlaxcalli, in his efforts to erase Aztec culture.

Many Spanish sources described the consumption of tortillas by indigenous peoples. For example, missionary Bernardino de Sahagún documented the wide range of tortillas eaten by the Aztecs, and he wrote of the Aztecs, "he who hath no tortillas, he falleth down; he droppeth quickly; there is a twittering as of birds in his ears; darkness descendeth upon him." Regarding the Maya, conquistador Pedro de Alvarado derided that they "only ate tortillas dipped in water mixed with ground chile". However, Spanish accounts of the Maya rarely mentioned tortillas. Missionaries of the Dominican Order noted that the Manche Chʼol Maya of the Petén Basin (modern-day Guatemala) did not know how to make tortillas. Writer Francisco Hernández de Toledo noted that, for the elite, tortillas could be so thin they were translucent. The Spanish recognized tortillas and maize as equivalent to their bread and wheat, (Note: Diego de Landa wrote, "They make bread in a number of ways, and it is a good and healthy bread, but it is bad to eat when cold so the Indian women go to pains to make it twice a day.") but they did not classify it as bread.

Wheat, the most important crop in Europe, was brought to Mexico once the conquest began. Corn and other products from the Americas spread to Europe, but the tortilla did not. Within this context, a division formed between corn-eating and wheat-eating cultures. As they defeated the Aztec and replaced Tenochtitlán with Mexico City, capital of New Spain, they planted wheat, installed ovens to bake loaf bread, and built a new market without tortillas. Tortillas were then restricted to segregated indigenous markets. Aztec women with experience baking tortillas began baking for the Spanish. The introduction of wheat also led indigenous people to use it for tortillas, though these did not yet use shortening. Some Spanish farmers grew corn, a more efficient crop, but the Spanish looked down upon tortillas. They found tortillas flavorless and believed that Europeans were healthiest eating European foods. Indigenous Mexicans still primarily ate tortillas, as long as corn was available, unless they were given bread as rations or wished to assimilate into Spanish culture. Cortés's estate received 1,600 tortillas per week to feed indigenous servants. During the Spanish conquest of the Maya, members of the Lacandon Maya prepared sourdough tortillas, toasted until dry, as a survival food as they fled. The colonists of Mexico City ate corn tortillas in emergencies, such as a wheat crop failure in 1602.

As missionaries converted Aztecs to Catholicism, they mentioned tortillas in place of bread in Nahuatl translations of Christian texts. During the Eucharist ritual, they gave tortillas as Communion bread, despite Catholic law requiring wheat; this may have motivated by convenience or by the symbolic significance of corn to the Aztec. The use of tortillas as Communion bread continued as a form of syncretism between Catholicism and local beliefs; the Maya around the town of Bacalar observed this tradition into the 17th century, in defiance of the Spanish.

=== Expansion of Mexico and flour tortillas ===
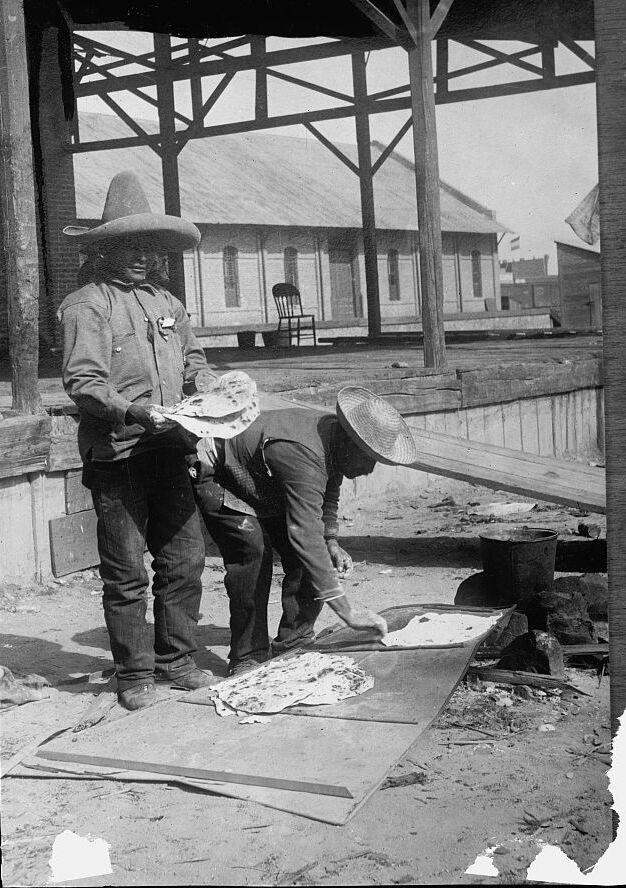
Tortilla making in Ciudad Juárez, early 20th century

From Mexico, the Spanish expanded north into the land of the Puebloan people, who used corn for a food similar to tortillas. (Note: Conquistador Francisco Vásquez de Coronado wrote of the Zuni Puebloans eating tortillas. This likely described a flatbread made of corn without nixtamalization.) This land was claimed as the Spanish province of New Mexico. It has been suggested that Jewish members of the 1598 expedition that claimed the land may have observed the Passover Seder using tortillas in place of matzah. New Spain also expanded north into Sonora, the land of the Tohono O'odham, where a 1687 Jesuit mission led by Eusebio Kino introduced winter wheat. The region became a major source of wheat in New Spain. Kino had initially used tortillas as Communion bread, but missionaries were soon able to perform the ritual with wheat bread.

Indigenous culture, featuring corn tortillas, and Spanish culture, featuring wheat bread, remained separate in the colonial era. The mestizo people—of mixed Spanish and indigenous descent—developed a cuisine with Spanish and indigenous influence. Mestizo market vendors served quesadillas, combining the indigenous tortilla with the European cheese. Tostadas were created by the mestizo community as a way to eat stale tortillas, becoming popular by the 19th century.

Settlers of the northern frontier—of Spanish or mestizo heritage—formed a distinct, wheat-centric culture. They created flour tortillas, milling Sonoran wheat and introducing lard to the recipe. Flour tortillas may have simply been a variation on corn tortillas, though it has been theorized that they were influenced by Middle Eastern breads, introduced by Muslim and Jewish settlers. (Note: Southern Mexicans sometimes refer to flour tortillas as "Arab bread", possibly signifying the exchange between Hispanic and Middle Eastern cultures.) On the northern frontier, flour tortillas were rolled out as large as 18 inches (46 cm), known as a tortilla grande de harina, or as small as 8 inches (20 cm). Sonorans wrapped flour tortillas around grilled beef, forming the burrito.

Flour tortillas became part of the regional identity of Northern Mexico; they were made of local wheat and quick to prepare. In the region, men began participating in tortilla production. Corn tortillas were still part of the regional identity of Central Mexico, where corn was easier to grow, and the locals preferred the taste of corn tortillas. Mexicans settled Texas on a large scale in the 18th century, identifying with the northern frontier culture and the Hispanic identity. They ate flour tortillas, whereas indigenous communities in the area, including diasporic Tiwa Puebloans, ate corn tortillas.

=== 19th-century cultural divisions ===
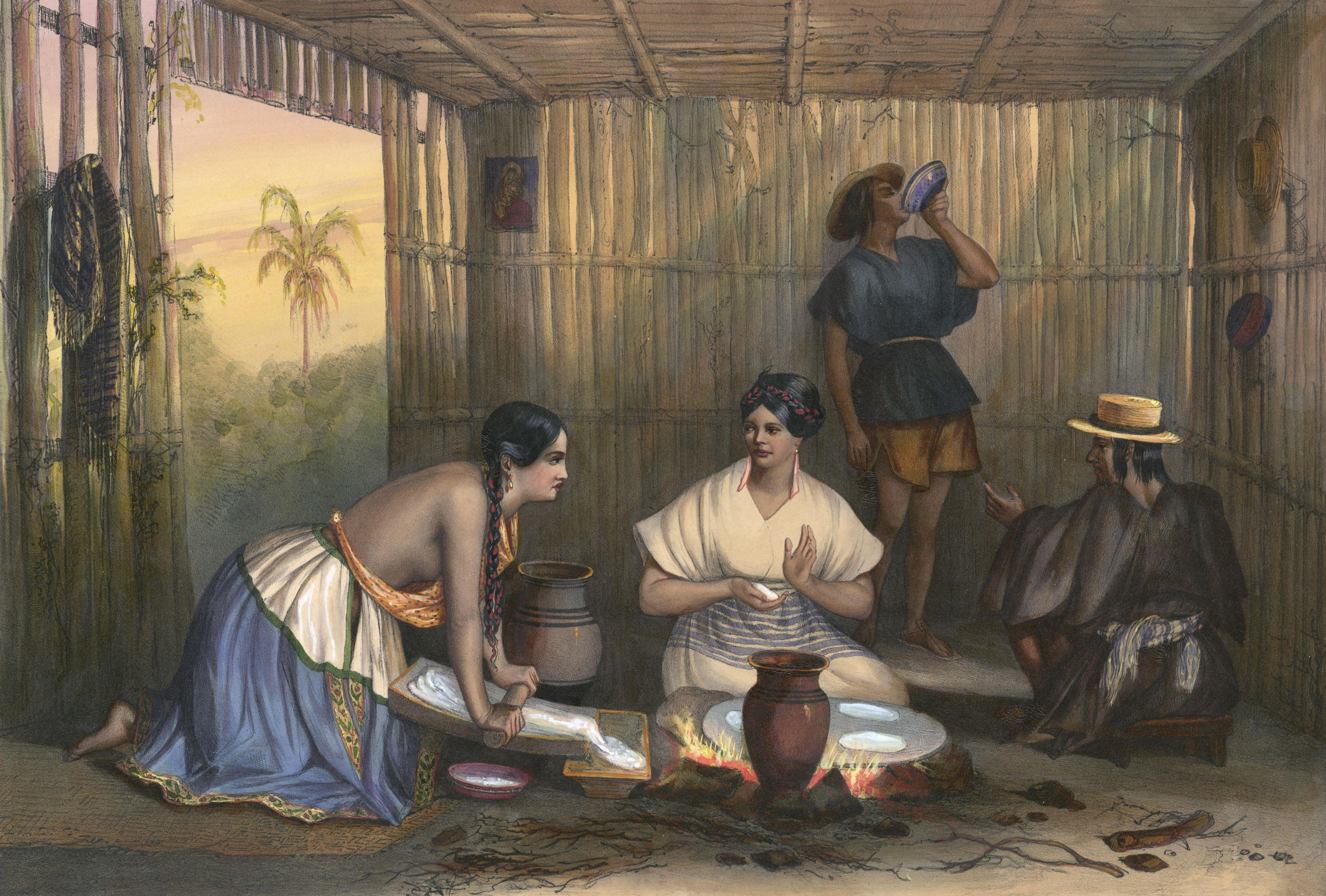
Las Tortilleras, lithograph by Carl Nebel (circa 1839)

Women prepared fresh tortillas even for men sent to fight or work on large projects, who would otherwise require non-perishable food. Soldiers in the Mexican–American War of 1847 ate totopos, which towns were required to provide them, but they were also accompanied by women to meet their demand of fresh tortillas. By the end of the century, coffee plantations in the Soconusco region (modern-day Chiapas) installed some of the earliest nixtamal mills so that tortillas would not need to be made from scratch for their workers.

After Texas received Anglo-American migrants and became part of the United States in 1848, Mexican Texans continued to eat tortillas with their meals. Anglo-Texans formed negative stereotypes about tortillas. Despite racial tensions, flour tortillas were popular among all cultures in Texas and the rest of the Southwestern United States. For Americans migrating west to California, tortillas were an affordable food source. They purchased burritos at village outposts. As Anglo-Californians replaced Mexican Californians as the dominant cultural group, they rejected Mexican foods, except for the beef burrito. Corn tortillas existed in California due to Central Mexican influence. A recipe for corn tortillas appeared in The Spanish Cook, an 1891 cookbook by Mexican Californian Encarnación Pinedo, directing readers to use mechanical mills rather than metates.

Among indigenous Mesoamericans, tortilla consumption increased to 70–75% of calories by the early 20th century as many native crops declined. From 1876 to 1911, Mexico was led by President Porfirio Diaz, who believed in modernization and derided traditions such as the corn tortilla. During this time, Senator Francisco Bulnes made pseudoscientific claims—known to historians as the tortilla discourse—that considered wheat to bring societal development, in contrast with the inferior corn. These views were supported by Diaz but did not resonate with the public; corn tortillas were nutritionally and culturally important for most Mexicans. During the Mexican Revolution (1910–1920), women who joined the troops, known as soldaderas, performed jobs including tortilla making.

=== Early attempts at industrialization ===
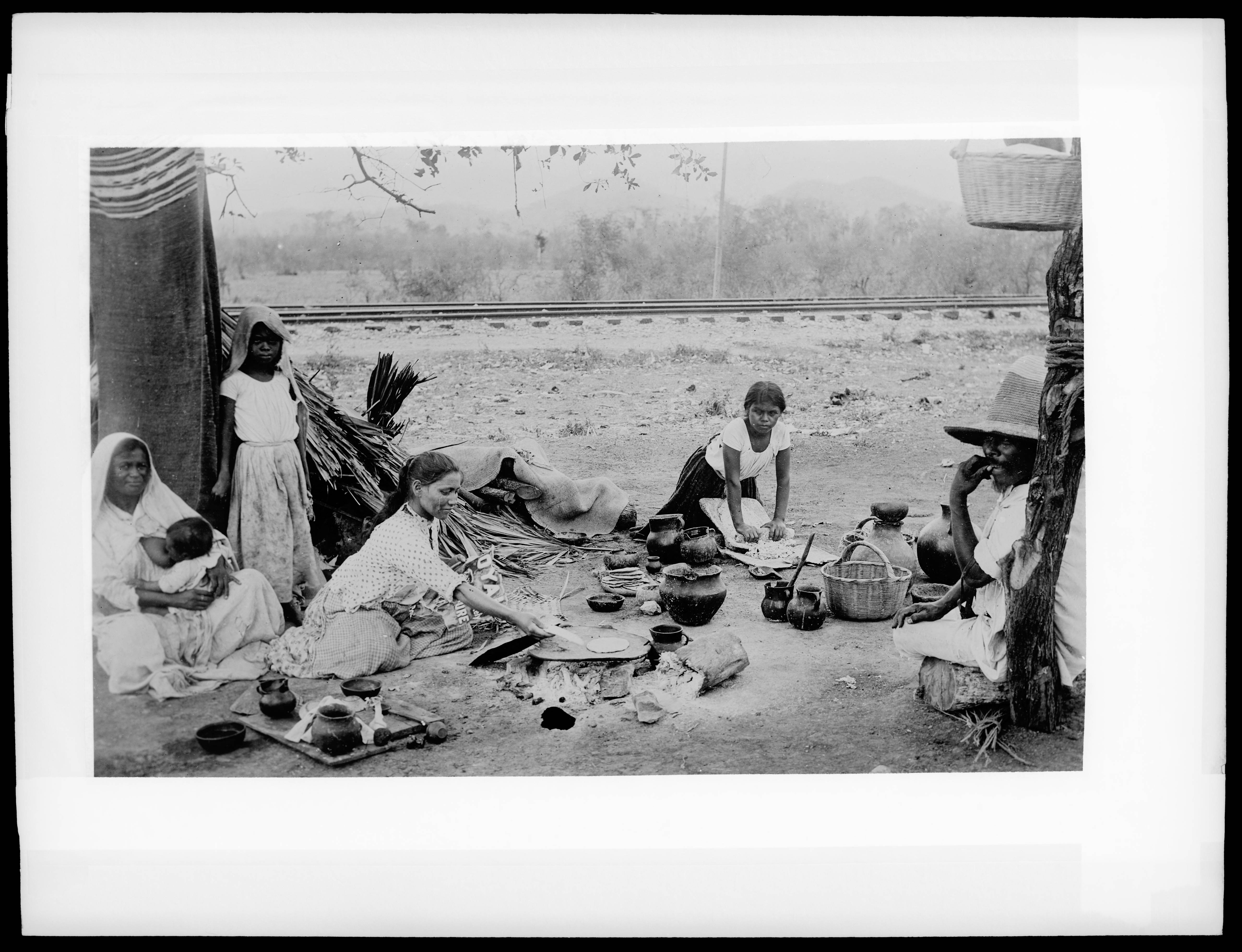
Making tortillas was very labor-intensive before industrialization.

The industrialization of tortillas began slowly in the pre-revolution era. The first patent for a tortilla machine was given to P. Celerino Cortes in 1884. The first to perform sheeting and cutting was created by Industrial Tortilladora S.A. in 1905. The tortilla press was invented in 1908 by Miguel Bernardo. Masa harina was mass-produced as early as 1909 by Tamalina, a company based in San Antonio, United States, which also developed an early form of tortilla chips. A Mexican patent for masa harina was given to engineer Luis Romero Soto in 1912, but his business plans did not materialize.

While industrialization impacted many aspects of life in Mexico, tortillas still required intense, precise labor. To provide tortillas every day, a housewife had to work 35–40 hours per week. Anthropologists including Margaret Park Redfield in the 1920s noted the amount of work needed. Mass production of tortillas was not yet commercially feasible. It could not successfully achieve economies of scale as it competed with small-scale producers of fresh tortillas, which were more palatable.

== Industrial production ==
=== Post-revolution Mexico ===
Tortilla Makers (1926)

The Grinder (1924)

Paintings by Diego Rivera depicting tortilla making

In post-revolution Mexico, tortilla making became more efficient. Rural communities gained access to electricity, so housewives could bring nixtamal to a mechanical mill rather than grind it by hand. They could also buy tortilla presses from stores. Middle-class households in Mexico City could purchase electric mills to grind corn in their kitchen. Many women entered the workforce in cities, so they purchased tortillas from tortillerias rather than making them. Most neighborhoods had tortillerias by 1930, despite many people considering store-bought tortillas to be inferior. As tortilla making became a business, men began doing it as a job. At tortilla factories and nixtamal mills, men and women worked in poor conditions, with men gradually shifting toward higher-paying positions. Tortilla workers formed labor unions.

The tortilla became a national symbol of Mexico as the national cuisine was developed. This cultural shift was reflected by artworks such as Diego Rivera's paintings Tortilla Makers and The Grinder. Mexican nationalism in the post-revolutionary era increased the popularity of the corn tortilla among the urban middle class, who read cookbooks that included foods from across the country. Still, bread remained the staple of wealthy mestizo communities, while corn tortillas were the staple of poor indigenous communities. Wheat tortillas remained popular only in the northern parts of the country, where the wheat industry was growing.

=== Tortilla machine and masa harina ===
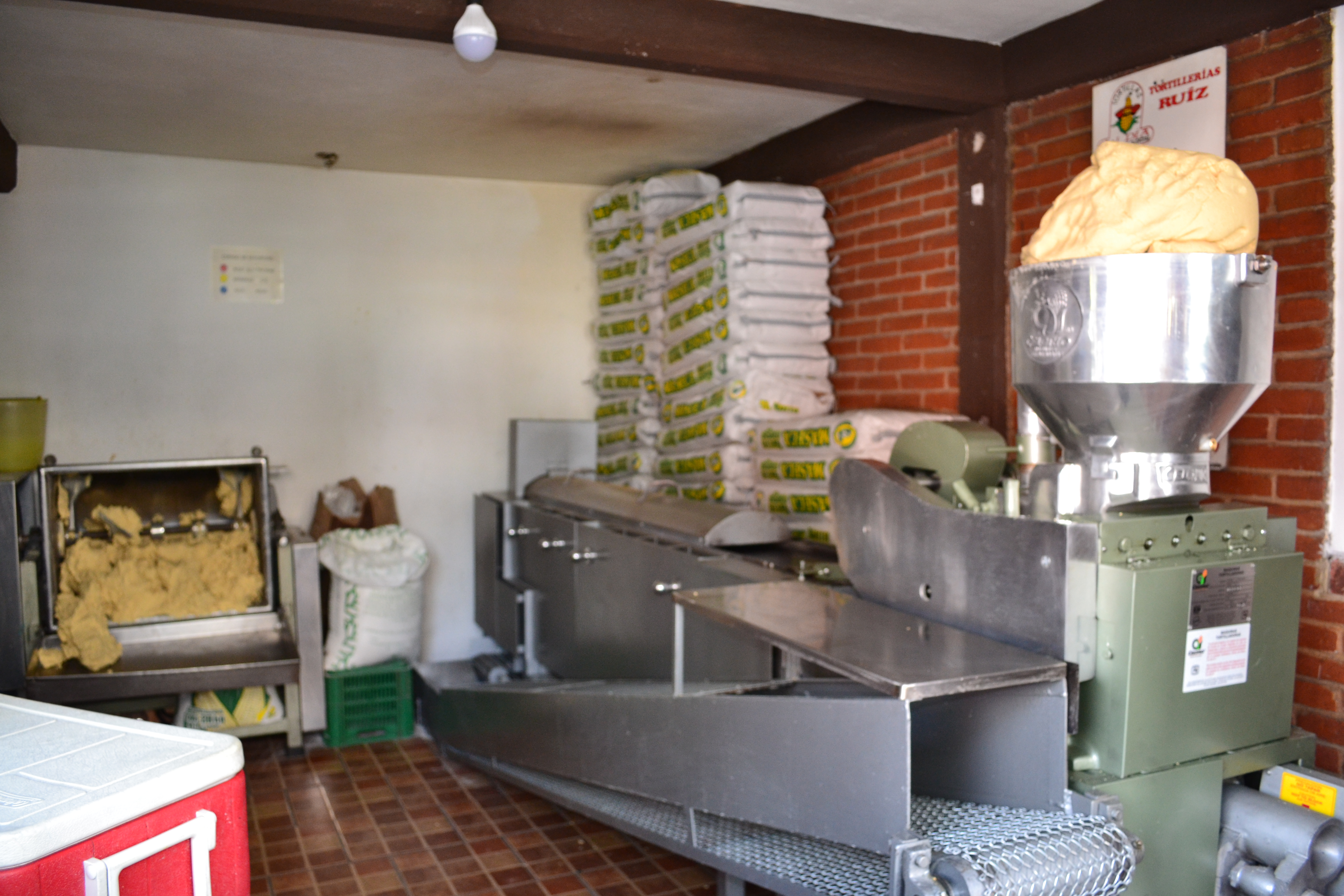
A tortilla machine and bags of masa harina

The modern design of the tortilla machine dates to the mid-20th century. The first business dedicated to tortilla machines was founded by Fausto Celorio in 1947 and gained wide use in the 1950s. Masa harina was invented to enable the mass production of corn tortillas. While wheat flour was fairly easy to process in machines, masa was very sticky, so it caused blockages and was hard to shape. The first commercial masa harina in Mexico was Maseca, founded by Roberto González Barrera in 1949, which became the first product of Gruma Corporation.

The use of masa harina for tortillas was appreciated by tortilla factories, as it was consistent and could easily incorporate additives, as well as working families, as it was quick and cheap. Producers of fresh masa saw a decline while flour mills saw growth, though some consumers still preferred tortillas made of fresh masa, which were more flavorful. Mass-produced tortillas became affordable for Mexican farmers, saving them time.

Masa harina was one of the largest changes in how tortillas are made; the rest of the tortilla-making process was mostly the same whether fresh or factory-made. Industrial tortilla production decreased the amount of time women spent cooking; it now only took 3–4 hours per week to eat tortillas every day. The spread of masa harina would contribute to the global reach of the tortilla industry.

=== Welfare policies ===
The economic policies of 20th-century Mexico have been described as "Tortilla Welfare". Enabled by mechanized production and the ejido farming system, welfare institutions strengthened infrastructure for corn and tortillas and the role of farmers in the domestic market. Corn and tortillas increasingly became a commodity, and the integration of corn into the national economy contributed to tortillas being a national symbol.

Government support for tortilla production was partly motivated by the 1943 crop failure of corn that had prevented people from eating tortillas. In 1944, the government funded a project led by agronomist Norman Borlaug to develop improve the yield of wheat and corn, sparking the Green Revolution. Wheat farmers quickly adopted Borlaug's dwarf wheat—by the 1960s, Sonora produced more than enough wheat for its flour tortilla consumption—but corn farmers maintained older varieties that they considered important for tortillas.

A state-funded masa harina producer, Minsa, was founded in 1950. The government supported masa harina while restricting the supply of fresh corn to stabilize tortilla prices. This policy received political support as masa harina efficiently provided food for the population. The government also subsidized tortillas to control the price, which contributed to the growth of masa mills and tortillerias. Welfare initiatives continued into the 1970s, with the establishment of social assistance programs—CONASUPO, DIF, and DINSA—that distributed food commodities like tortillas. Minsa and Maseca were the only major masa harina companies for decades. (Note: In 1980, of the 17 masa harina factories in Mexico, Maseca owned 10 and Minsa owned 6. The other 1 was run by the state-owned CONASUPO.) They collaborated on the development of masa harina through the 1970s, a period seeing slow growth of the product.

=== Spread outside of Mexico ===
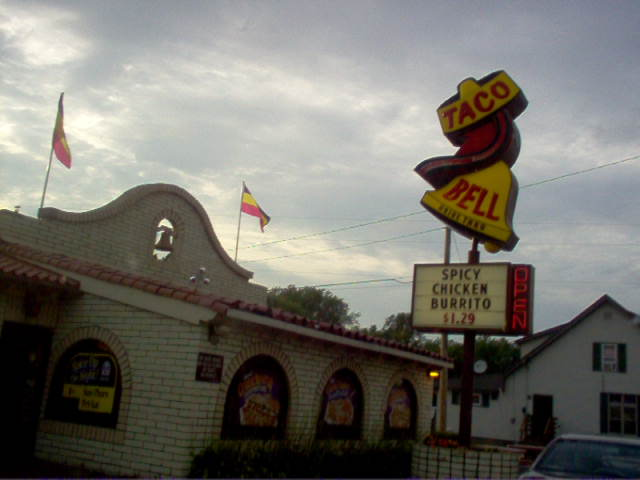
Taco Bell, founded in 1962, popularized the taco shell.

By the mid-20th century, tacos were widespread in Texas and California as part of their respective Tex-Mex and Cal-Mex cuisines, but they were little known beyond the Southwest. In the 1940s, Old El Paso sold tortillas in cans to be shipped to American communities without tortillerias, and multiple American companies produced tortilla making equipment.

Nachos originated in 1943, improvised by Ignacio "Nacho" Anaya, the maître d'hôtel at a restaurant in Piedras Negras, Coahuila, on the Texan border. The taco shell—a fried, bent tortilla—was popularized by the fast food chain Taco Bell, founded by Glen Bell in California in 1962. In developing the taco shell, Bell aimed to increase efficiency, but another effect was to remove the need for the labor of tortilla makers that had been tied to Hispanic communities. Taco Bell spread across the country, making tacos familiar in these regions. Tortilla chips also became popular in the country, being mass-produced by Frito-Lay. In Australia, Californian immigrant Bill Chilcote founded the restaurant chain Taco Bill. This was Australia's only major supplier of tortillas until the establishment of the wholesale retailer Aztec Foods in 1986.

In 1980s Nicaragua, the Sandinista government promoted eating corn tortillas rather than wheat bread as the United States limited wheat imports. However, tortilla consumption remained lower than that of bread rolls for many people.

== Globalization ==
=== Shift toward large-scale production ===
Technological advancements enabled tortillas to be made on a very large scale with low prices. The number of tortilla factories in Mexico increased from 2,214 in 1945 to 23,216 in 1980, and annual production of masa harina reached 500,000 tons in 1975. Tortilla purchases shifted from tortillerias to mass-production companies. The proportion of tortillas that used masa harina increased from 15% in 1991 to 27% in 1993.

Tortilla companies became vertically integrated. Most of the industry's growth was in large corporations such as Gruma, including its American subsidiary Mission Foods; the corporation gained influence on Mexico's corn industry as the economy shifted toward neoliberalism. Mexican president Carlos Salinas de Gortari, responding to the economic crisis of the 1980s, implemented a price ceiling for tortillas while increasing the price of fresh corn. This was followed by a 1990 policy subsidizing tortillerias only if they used masa harina. A 1996 article in The New York Times by Anthony DePalma argued that Gruma was subject to favoritism by Salinas's administration. Small-scale producers in California and Texas accused Gruma of anti-competitive practices. Gruma's success made González Barrera a billionaire, and he gained the nickname "Tortilla King".

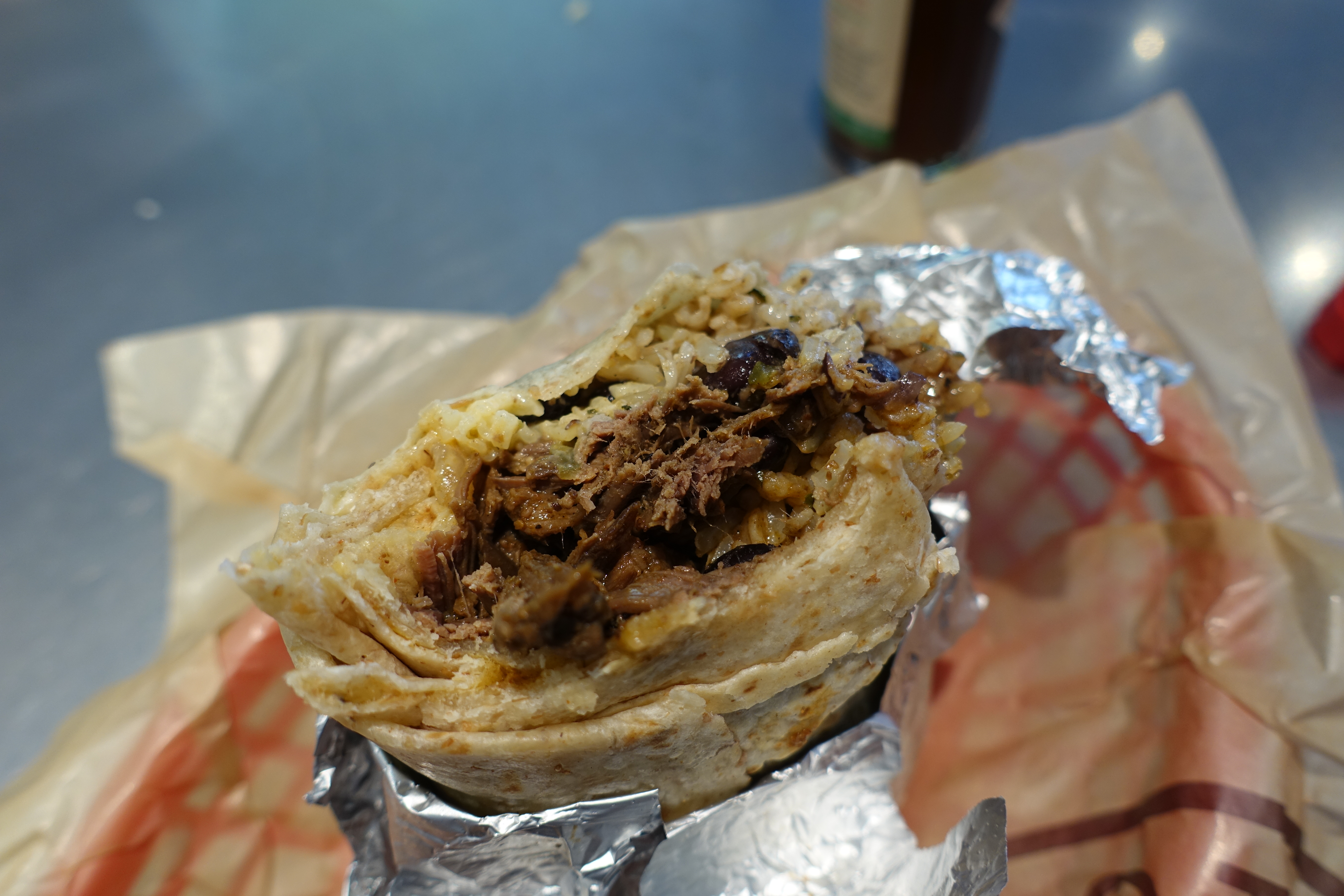
A burrito from Chipotle Mexican Grill

Mexican food in the United States grew as an industry amid shifts in trade and consumer preferences. The country produced $2.5 billion of tortillas in 1996, with 25,000 people, mostly immigrants, working in the industry. Taco Bell attempted to expand to Mexico in 1992, with a localized menu featuring fresh tortillas, but failed. The fast food chain Chipotle Mexican Grill, founded in 1993, created a version of burritos that became popular across the United States. Around this time, companies began selling wraps, a type of tortilla made of whole wheat and sometimes flavored, aiming to avoid being associated only with Mexican cuisine. Tortillas became an American cultural icon, promoted by companies such as Mission Foods, which launched a sponsored attraction at Disneyland in California in 2001.

Mexican government policy shifted away from Tortilla Welfare as it became liberalized in years following the 1980s economic crisis. Fresh masa tortillas were no longer a cheap food source in the country as price controls were lifted in the 1990s, and tortillerias had to switch to masa harina. After the North American Free Trade Agreement (NAFTA) began in 1994, the price of tortillas increased by 483% by 1999. President Ernesto Zedillo introduced vouchers known as tortivales that gave low-income families 1 kilogram of tortillas per day. Corn imported from the United States became competitive with Mexican producers. The Progresa welfare program, launched in 1997, provided households with money, not tortillas. Globalization of the Mexican economy, strengthened by NAFTA, made the country more dependent on cheap, imported corn, particularly from the United States, leading to a decline in domestic production. Corn prices increased in 2006–2007 amid an increase in U.S. demand for corn-derived ethanol. This led to a sharp increase in the price of tortillas, resulting in a period of protests known as the Tortilla Crisis. These protests saw strong engagement due to the sociocultural importance of tortillas. In response, President Felipe Calderón introduced the Tortilla Price Stabilization Pact, in which several producers implemented a price ceiling.

The popularity of corn tortilla motivated initiatives to develop fortified versions. Maseca began producing soybean-fortified masa harina in 1998. A research program to fortify nixtamal was led by Michael Dunn of Brigham Young University from 2004 to 2007, while another to fortify masa harina was led by Sergio Serna-Saldivar of the Tecnológico de Monterrey.

=== Global popularity ===
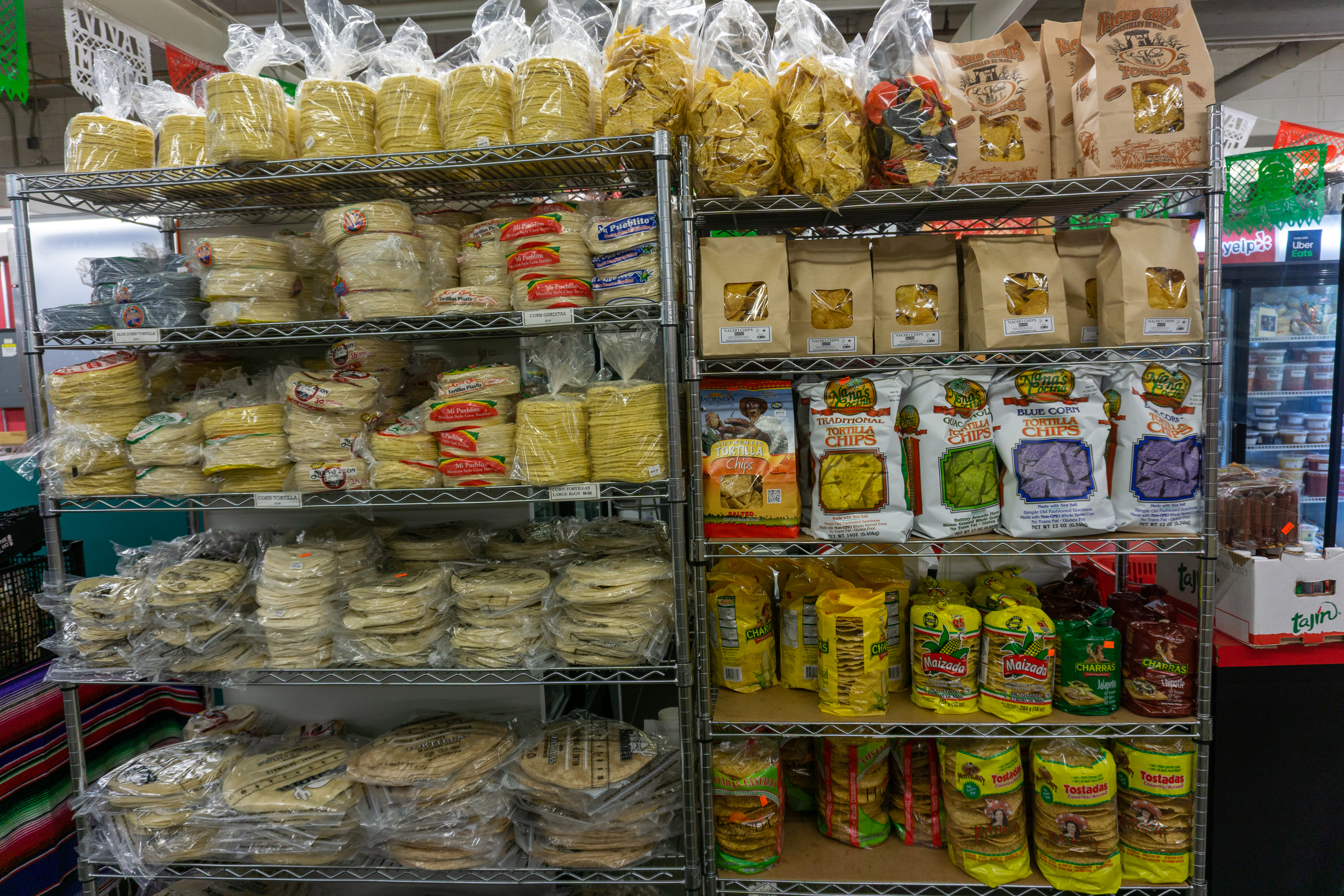
Tortillas sold at a store in Canada

In the early 21st century, sales of tortillas increased in the United States and other countries, being widely available at grocery stores and used for wraps at restaurants and take-out establishments. Global sales reached $9 billion in 2002 (equivalent to $16 billion in 2025). Sales in the United States reached $6 billion in 2006 (equivalent to $10 billion in 2025), with an annual growth rate of 9%, before reaching $9 billion in 2009 (equivalent to $14 billion in 2025, with an annual growth rate of 57%. The industrialization of the tortilla increased its famililarity, thus contributing to the popularity of the fresh tortilla.

In Mexico, however, consumption of corn tortillas decreased from a daily average of 249 grams (8.8 oz) in 2002 to 157 grams (5.5 oz) in 2010. It became rare to prepare corn tortillas from scratch, except in some rural indigenous communities, such as the Otomi of the state of Guanajuato. Mexican consumers gained more food options, while tortillas were viewed by some as poor people's food.

Tortillas became popular in Europe and Asia. For example, in the United Kingdom, wheat tortilla sales increased by 17% in 2010. As the market for Mexican food in Australia increased, driven in part by middle-class Mexican immigrants, a market formed for local tortilla producers in the 2010s.

== See also ==
- History of agriculture
- History of bread
- History of Mexico
