= Michael Dunn =

Michael or Mike Dunn may refer to:

- Michael Dunn (actor) (1934–1973), American actor and singer
- Michael Dunn (American football) (born 1994), American NFL football player
- Michael Dunn (art historian) (born 1942), New Zealand writer and art historian
- Michael Dunn (cricketer) (1940–2025), English cricketer
- Michael Dunn (nutritionist), director of Brigham Young University's Department of Nutrition, Dietetics and Food Science
- Michael Dunn (politician) (1859–??), American politician
- Michael Collins Dunn (1947–2023), American scholar of the Middle East
- Michael David Dunn, the perpetrator of the murder of Jordan Davis
- Michael A. Dunn, general authority of The Church of Jesus Christ of Latter-day Saints
- Michael V. Dunn, commissioner of the Commodity Futures Trading Commission
- Mike Dunn (baseball) (born 1985), former Major League Baseball pitcher
- Mike Dunn (musician), American DJ and record producer
- Mike Dunn (snooker player) (born 1971), English snooker player
- Michael Dunn, American singer in the duo Dick and Dee Dee
- Mickey Dunn, a character in CSI: Crime Scene Investigation episode "Living Legend"

== See also ==
- Michael Dunne (disambiguation)
