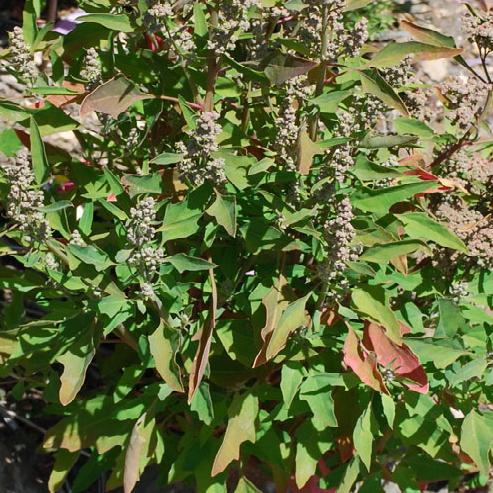

Scientific classification
- Kingdom: Plantae
- Clade: Tracheophytes
- Clade: Angiosperms
- Clade: Eudicots
- Order: Caryophyllales
- Family: Amaranthaceae
- Genus: Chenopodium
- Species: C. nuttalliae

Binomial name
- Chenopodium nuttalliae Saff.

Synonyms
- Chenopodium berlandieri subsp. nuttalliae

= Chenopodium nuttalliae =

Species of edible plant native to Mexico

Chenopodium nuttalliae is a species of plant also known by the common names huauzontle (literally 'hairy amaranth', from the Nahuatl huauhtli 'amaranth' and tzontli 'hair') and Aztec broccoli. (Note: Other variations of the name include huauhzontle, huazontle, huanzontle, and guausoncle.) It is related to other commonly consumed plants such as quinoa, amaranth, and epazote, as well as the common American weeds goosefoot and lambsquarters.

The plant is native to Mexico and has a number of culinary uses.

== Description ==
The plant grows upright branches with red tinted green leafy stems. Huauzontle stems superficially resemble baby broccoli, although the stems are much thinner, and support fewer of the leaves.

Huauzontles have a polyploid genome, similar to quinoa. In 2024, researchers published the genome of an accession of huauzontle from Puebla, Mexico.

== Distribution and habitat ==
The species is native to Mexico. Like amaranth, it is very resistant to cold and dry climates, and grows even in poor soil.

== Uses ==
As with other members of the goosefoot family, the leaves, branches, flowers (inflorescence), and seeds of huauzontle are all edible. The plant is used both as a herb and as a vegetable in Mexican cuisine. While it is eaten throughout Mexico, it is most commonly consumed in the center of the country, especially in the states of Tlaxcala, Mexico, Guerrero, Morelos, and in the south of Mexico City. With a high nutritional content, it serves as a grain alternative in regions with difficulties sowing other types of cereals.

One popular dish is huauzontle pancakes stuffed with cheese and topped with tomato sauce. Alternatively, huauzontles can be encased in an egg batter and deep-fried with a stick of salty Mexican cheese. Huauzontle is used to season salads, ahuautles in pasilla sauce, and beef fillets. The mature seeds can also be ground into flour to make tortillas.

Like quinoa, another plant in the genus Chenopodium, huauzontle contains saponins, albeit in lesser quantities. While saponins are toxic to humans, huauzontle contains such small amounts that they pose no risk. Additionally, saponins are difficult for the human body to absorb, and are mostly rendered inactive when cooked.

== In culture ==
During the rule of Moctezuma, huauzontle and amaranth were the fourth most important crops, after maize, beans, and chia. Many towns paid tribute to the Aztec empire in huauzontle.
