= Michael Dunne =

Michael or Mike Dunne may refer to:

- Mike Dunne (journalist) (1949–2007), American writer
- Mick Dunne (1929–2002), Irish sports journalist
- Mike Dunne (baseball) (born 1962), American baseball player
- Mike Dunne (rugby union) (1906–1967), Irish rugby union player
- Michael Dunne (MP) (1800–1876), member of the UK parliament for Queen's County, 1852–1865
- Stephen Dunne (actor) (1918–1977), American actor sometimes credited as Michael Dunne

== See also ==
- Michael Dunn (disambiguation)
