= Axayacatl (insect) =

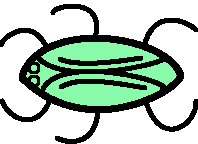
This is a reproduction of the Aztec glyph for the axayacatl, as seen in Book 11 of the Florentine Codex.

Axayacatl [ɑʃɑˈjɑkɑt͡ɬ] and its plural, āxaxayacatl [ɑːʃɑʃɑˈjɑkɑt͡ɬ] (the plural form is not commonly used in daily Nahuatl) are the two common names of pre-Hispanic origin used in Mexico to refer to species of aquatic insects in the family Corixidae, the eggs of which, ahuauhtli ([aˈwawt͡ɬi]) (in Spanish ahuautle), deposited abundantly on rushes (grass-like plants in the Juncaceae family) and flags (species of Iris plant) in lakes and ponds, are collected and sold as a sort of Mexican caviar, as part of Aztec cuisine.

== Gastronomy use ==
Both the adult axayácatl and its roe are edible. The insect is caught with a net and roasted before being eaten; the ahuautle is obtained by placing tules on the shore of the lakes (in the past, corn leaves were used) where the axayácatl leaves its eggs, which are then dried and roasted. Both foods are very rich in protein, with digestible protein percentages of 61.96 and 63.88 percent, respectively.

The accounts of the Spanish conquistadors tell that they were given as an offering to the divinity Xiuhtecutli. They were also brought to Montezuma's court in Tenochtitlan daily, so that the Aztec emperor could eat them fresh for breakfast. Normally, the ahuautle was eaten in tortas or taquitos and the conquistadors learned to appreciate it on Fridays, when their Catholic religion prevented them from eating red meat.

Nowadays, the axayácatl is eaten toasted, while the ahuautle is usually prepared in cakes dipped in egg batter and fried, but also in tamales or mixiotes. They are most consumed during Lent and Christmas Eve. Cultivation of these species is simple and cheap, although they fetch high prices in the market due to high demand. In addition, they are endangered by the drying and pollution of the lakes in which they have their habitat.

== See also ==
- Escamol
