= Michael Dunn (nutritionist) =

American nutritionist

Michael Dunn is, As of November 2008, the director of Brigham Young University's Department of Nutrition, Dietetics and Food Science. Dunn was the leader a team also including BYU students Kathryn Burton and Adam Richins that developed a way to make corn tortillas which were fortified with iron and other essential vitamins to aid the health of people who live primarily on corn tortillas, such as most children in Mexico.

Dunn worked for the International Food Network before joining the BYU faculty five years ago.

Dunn received a Ph.D. from Cornell University in 1996.

== Sources ==
- BYU faculty listing
- Salt Lake Tribune article on Dunn's tortilla work
- BYU newsnet article on Dunn's corn fortification project
- Daily Herald article on project
- [IDX]=348993 Agriculture Academia "Who's Who" sight listing for Dunn
