= Tito's Taquitos =

Chain of Mexican restaurants in the Portland metropolitan area, U.S.

Restaurant information
- Established: 2021
- Owner: Anthony La Pietra
- Chef: Anthony La Pietra
- Food type: Mexican
- Location: Oregon, United States
- Website: titostaquitos.com

Tito's Taquitos is a small chain of Mexican restaurants in the Portland metropolitan area, in the United States. Established in 2021, the business has operated from food carts and brick-and-mortar spaces in Portland and Beaverton. Tito's Taquitos serves potato-filled taquitos and tacos with various toppings, as well as agua fresca, chocolate brownies, and tres leches cake. The restaurant has garnered a positive reception and was named Food Cart of the Year by The Oregonian in 2022.

== Description ==
Tito's Taquitos is a small chain of casual counter service Mexican restaurants in the Portland metropolitan area. The menu includes potato-filled taquitos and tacos with toppings such as birria, shredded chicken, shrimp, and vegetables like al pastor-style chickpeas, asada mushrooms, and hibiscus flowers. Taquitos also have cabbage, pickled onion, and radish. Salsas include chile de arbol, habanero, and tomatillo. The restaurant also serves agua fresca, brownies made with Mexican chocolate, and tres leches cake. The potato filling has boiled and mashed Russet potatoes, as well as garlic, pepper, and salt. Tito's Taquitos has also served tamarind-glazed ribs, beer, and wine.

== History ==
The business began operating in January or February 2021, initially from a teal-colored food cart in a church parking lot in southwest Portland. Anthony La Pietra is the chef and owner. He named the business after his late stepfather Margarito "Tito" Jimenez . The business received a positive response and by September, La Pietra had to close temporarily to relocate to a larger cart. He moved to a parking lot with a covered deck at a 76 gas station along Southwest Beaverton Hillsdale Highway. Tito's Taquitos reopened on May 12, 2022.

The business opened its first brick-and-mortar restaurant on Swan Island in north Portland's Overlook neighborhood in May 2023, in a space that previously housed a Tilt location. The larger space provided support and supplies to the food cart. In November 2023, La Pietra announced plans to open a second cart at Breakside Brewery's cart pod in Beaverton in early 2024. On November 23, Tito's Taquitos operated as a pop-up at Breakside Brewery's taproom in Milwaukie. The Beaverton location opened on January 27, 2024, operating alongside other food carts including Farmer and the Beast, Fry Bar, Let's Roll, and Matt's BBQ.

In January 2025, the Beaverton Breakside food cart was converted to Alitas, serving burritos and chicken wings. In February, La Pietra opened Tito's Taquitos in a nearby brick-and-mortar space that previously housed Magna Kubo. In May 2025, La Pietra and Carlos Mendoza opened Tito's Taquitos at a brick-and-mortar space along Capitol Highway, in the space that previously housed a Little Big Burger location. It operates approximately one mile from the original food cart's location in Multnomah Village. With these changes, Tito Taquito's no longer operated from any food carts.

== Reception ==
Katherine Chew Hamilton and Karen Brooks included Tito's Taquitos in Portland Monthly's 2021 list of the city's best new food carts. Hamilton later included the business in the newspaper's 2022 list of twenty food carts "that define Portland now". Hamilton, Alex Frane, and Brooke Jackson-Glidden also included the business in a 2025 overview of the city's best Mexican cuisine. In 2022, Willamette Week said, "At Tito's, the taquitos are neither an appetizer nor an afterthought but an elaborate—and elaborately composed—entree."

Tito's Taquitos was named the Food Cart of the Year by The Oregonian in 2022. The newspaper's Michael Russell also included the plain potato taquitos in an overview of the city's ten best dishes of 2022. He said the business made "the best gas station-adjacent taquitos in America" in 2022, and he and Mims Copeland described the cart as "phenomenal" in 2024. In 2026, Russell said Tito's Taquitos was among a dozen worthy alternative selections for The New York Times's list of the nation's 41 best Mexican restaurants, which included Portland's Ki'ikibáa and Mis Tacones. The business ranked second in best tacos category of The Oregonian's Readers Choice Awards in 2026.

In 2023, Tito's Taquitos ranked number 64 in Yelp's list of the nation's top taco restaurants. Meira Gebel and Emily Harris included the business in Axios Portland's 2023 list of six eateries for "standout" tacos in the city. Zoe Baillargeon included Tito's Taquitos in Eater Portland's 2026 overview of the city's best Mexican restaurants.

== See also ==
- Hispanics and Latinos in Portland, Oregon
- List of Mexican restaurants
- List of restaurant chains in the United States
