= Autentica =

Defunct Mexican restaurant in Portland, Oregon, U.S.

Restaurant information
- Established: 2006
- Closed: July 13, 2019
- Owner: Oswaldo Bibiano
- Head chef: Oswaldo Bibiano
- Food type: Mexican
- Location: Portland, Multnomah, Oregon, United States

Autentica was a Mexican restaurant in Portland, Oregon, United States. Owned by chef Oswaldo Bibiano, the restaurant operated in Northeast Portland's Concordia neighborhood from 2006 to July 2019.

== Description ==
The Mexican restaurant Autentica (which translates to "authentic" in Spanish) operated in Northeast Portland's Concordia neighborhood. One guide book by Moon Publications called the interior "colorful" and "warm". Eater Portland described the restaurant as "dark" and "sultry". The Oregonian called Autentica "midscale"; writers for Portland Monthly and the Portland Tribune described the restaurant as "higher-end".

=== Menu ===
The Guerrero-focused menu included chicken mole, tacos al pastor, and Oaxacan melting cheese with chorizo. One entree included two different enchiladas and a Chile relleno. The restaurant also served ceviche, pozole, chilaquiles, quesadillas, tortas, and cactus leaves, as well as an octopus salad and prawns. The mole was made with 30 ingredients, including bread, clove, cinnamon, nuts, and, plantain. The chivo had potatoes and red onions. The brunch menu included entomatadas, huevos rancheros, and steak and eggs. Margaritas and micheladas were among drink options. The restaurant had vegetarian options and made tortillas in-house.

== History ==
Autentica opened in 2006. Oswaldo Bibiano was the chef and owner. Mextiza was decribed as Autentica's "sister" establishment. Autentica was vandalized in 2017.

In June 2019, the business announced plans to close permanently on July 13.

== Reception ==
In 2009, Bart Blasengame of Portland Monthly said the business was among the city's best Mexican restaurants. The magazine's Allison Jones said Autentica "tops many lists of the best Mexican restaurants within Portland city limits" in 2011. Benjamin Tepler of Portland Monthly said the restaurant "serves one of the best Mexican brunches in town" in 2014. Bibiano was a semifinalist in the Best Chef: Northwest category at the James Beard Foundation Awards in 2010 for his work at Autentica. Zagat said the business was among the nation's best Mexican restaurants in 2013. In 2019, Willamette Week said Bibiano delivered "beautifully complex dishes" at Autentica. Michael Russell included the business in The Oregonian's list of "Portland's most painful restaurant closures of 2019".

== See also ==
- Hispanics and Latinos in Portland, Oregon
- List of defunct restaurants of the United States
- List of Mexican restaurants
