= Cha Cha Cha (restaurant) =

Chain of Mexican restaurants in Portland, Oregon, U.S.

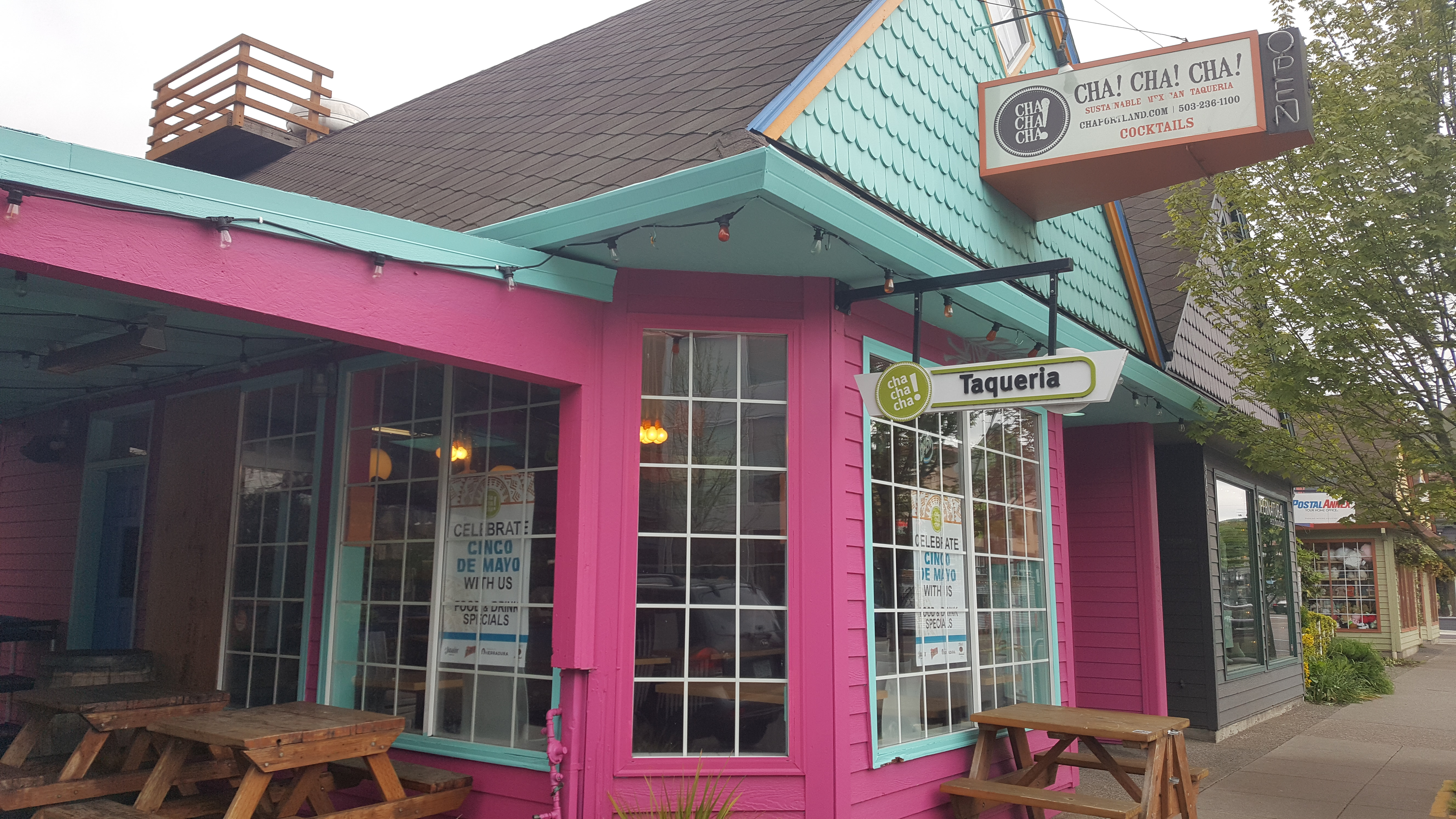
- Exterior of a Cha Cha Cha restaurant on Hawthorne Boulevard in Southeast Portland, Oregon, 2022

Restaurant information
- Established: 2001
- Owner: Javier Hurtado
- Chef: Javier Hurtado
- Food type: Mexican
- Location: Portland, Multnomah, Oregon, United States
- Website: chachachapdx.com

Cha Cha Cha Mexican Taqueria (often simply Cha Cha Cha, or sometimes Cha! Cha! Cha!) is a chain of Mexican restaurants in Portland, Oregon. Chef and owner Javier Hurtado opened the first restaurant in 2001. There were nine locations, as of 2014. The menu includes traditional Mexican food such as burritos, enchilada, tacos, tamales, and margaritas. Cha Cha Cha is family-friendly and has garnered a positive reception.

== Description ==
Cha Cha Cha is a chain of Mexican restaurants in Portland, Oregon. The menu includes burritos, tacos, tamales, tortas, and salads with carne asada, chicken, fish, and pork carnitas. The "wet" version of a burrito includes red enchilada sauce, guacamole, pico de Gallo, and sour cream. The machada burrito has shredded beef, scrambled eggs, Spanish rice, and vegetables, and Cha Cha Cha also serves a breakfast burrito. The restaurant has enchiladas with Dungeness crab and a sauce of garlic and white wine; another variety has mole. The menu has also included poblanos stuffed with seafood, as well as margaritas.

== History and locations ==
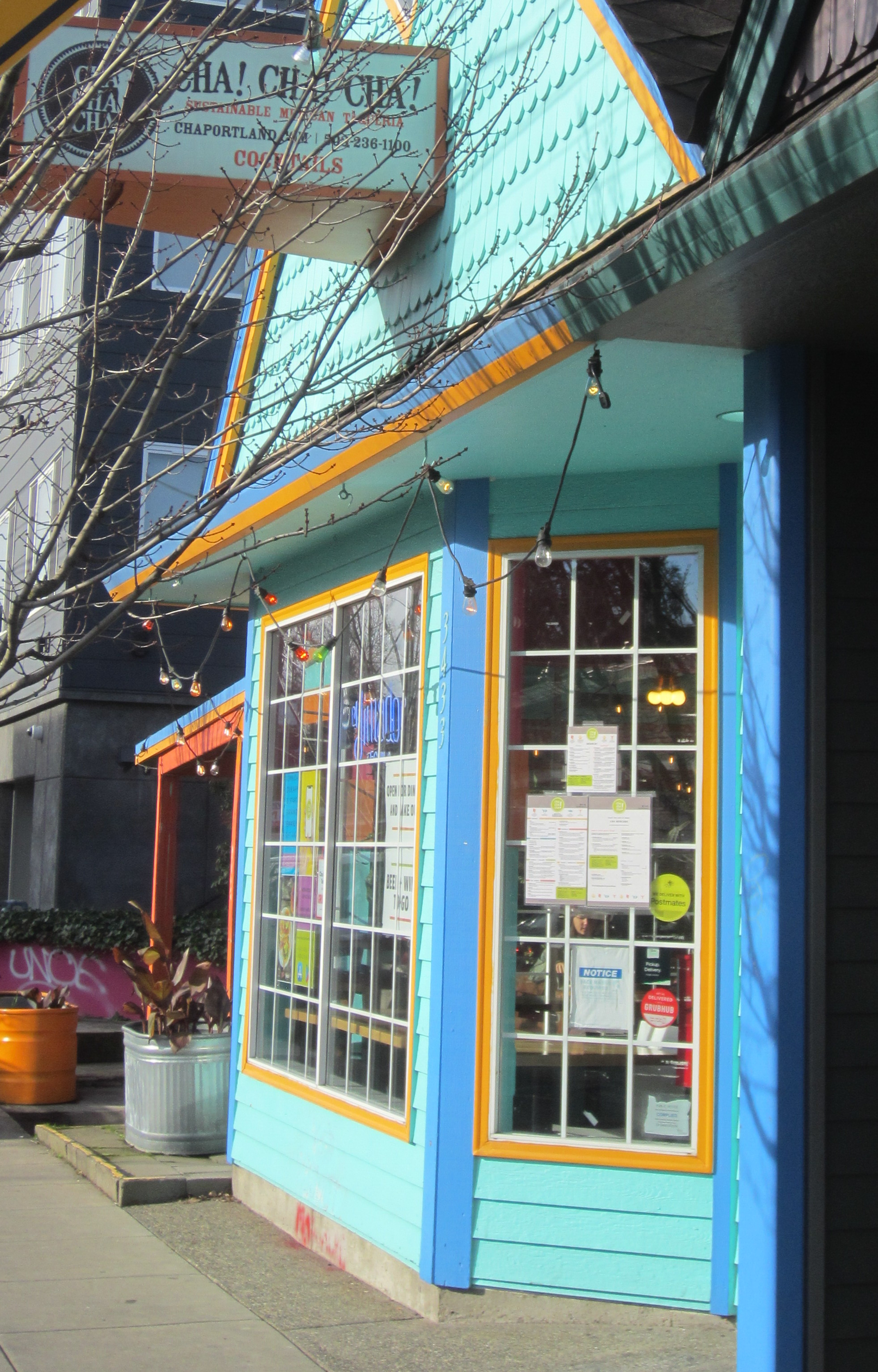
Exterior of the Hawthorne Boulevard restaurant in 2021

Javier Hurtado is the chef and owner. He opened the first Cha Cha Cha restaurant in 2001. In 2003, there were three locations in downtown Portland and another planned for Southeast Portland's Sellwood-Moreland neighborhood.

In 2013, the business announced plans to operate in a 1,700-square-foot space in South Waterfront's Emery building. There were nine locations, as of 2014. A woman sued the business for gender discrimination in 2018.

Cha Cha Cha has operated in the following neighborhoods:

- Downtown Portland (Southwest Portland)
- Pearl District (Northwest Portland)
- Sellwood-Moreland (Southeast Portland)
- South Waterfront

Cha Cha Cha also operates at Portland International Airport.

Hurtado converted a Cha Cha Cha restaurants he opened in 2011 into the Cintli Cantina in 2022. He also operated Cha Taqueria Bar on 21st Avenue in Northwest Portland. Eater Portland described Cha Taqueria Bar as "the slightly more upscale property of the Cha! Cha! Cha! local chainlet".

== Reception ==
Cha Cha Cha has garnered a positive reception and is a perennial favorite in Willamette Week's annual readers' poll. The business won in the Best Burrito category in 2005, 2006, and 2007, and received honorable mention in the Best Mexican Food category in 2015. One guide book by Moon Publications recommended Cha Cha Cha for families with children. Julie Lee included the chain in 1859 Oregon's Magazine's 2015 list of Portland's best family restaurants and 2016 list of the city's best burritos. In a 2022 list of Portland's highest-rated Mexican restaurants based on Tripadvisor, Cha Cha Cha had an overall rating of 4 out of 5, based on 90 reviews. The chain scored the same in the atmosphere, food, service, and value categories.

== See also ==
- Hispanics and Latinos in Portland, Oregon
- List of Mexican restaurants
- List of restaurant chains in the United States
