= La Bonita (restaurant) =

Mexican restaurant in Portland, Oregon, U.S.

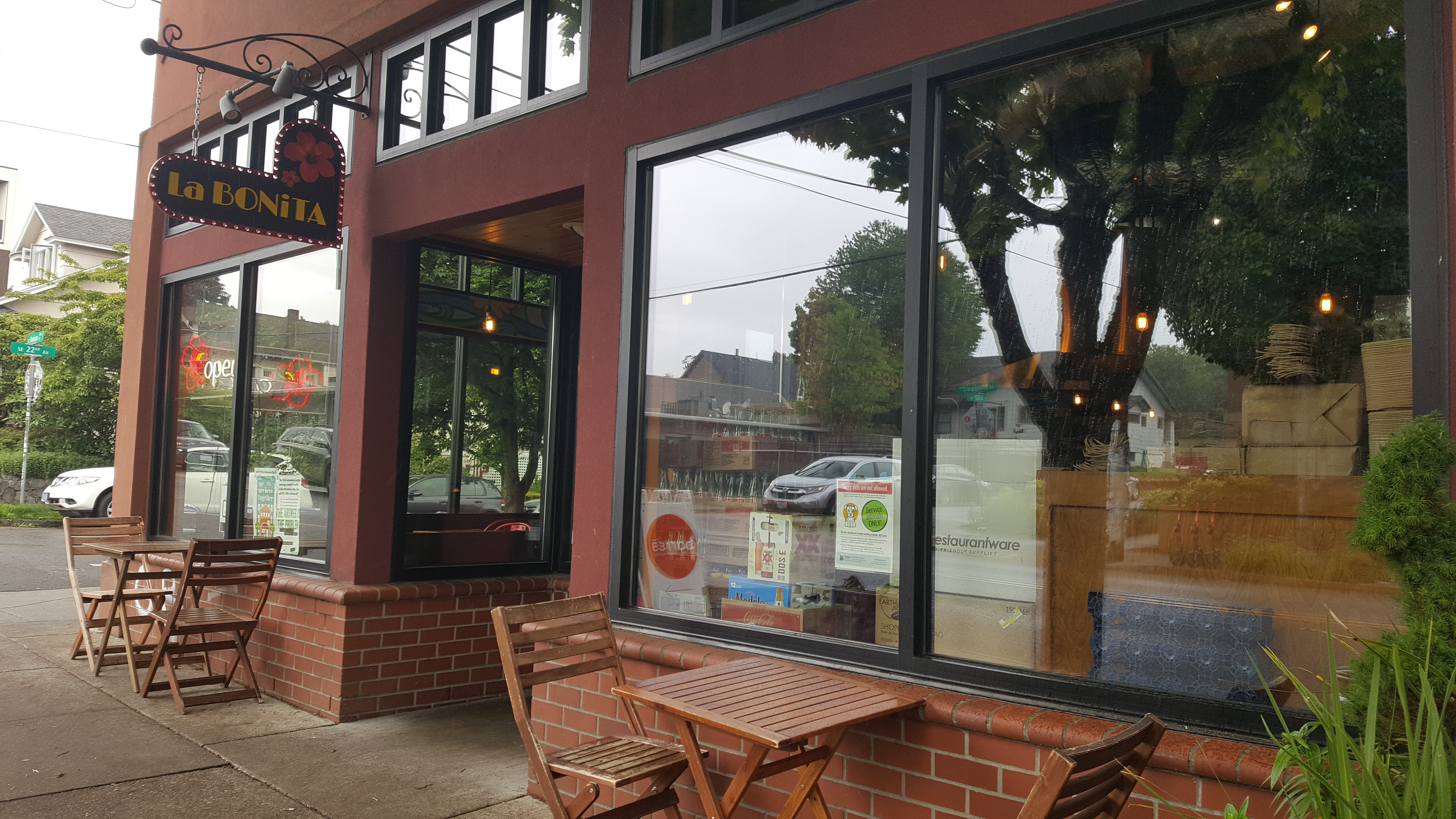
- Exterior of the restaurant in southeast Portland's Hosford-Abernethy neighborhood, 2022

Restaurant information
- Food type: Mexican
- Location: 2839 Northeast Alberta Street; 2710 North Killingsworth Street; 2138 Southeast Division Street, Portland, Multnomah, Oregon, United States
- Other locations
- Website: labonitapdx.com

La Bonita: Food for the People, or simply La Bonita, is a small chain of Mexican restaurants in Portland, Oregon, United States. The family-owned business operates three locations in north (since 2011), northeast, and southeast Portland (since 2020), serving burritos, chilaquiles, tacos, tamales, and other traditional cuisine. The restaurant has a good reputation, and has been included on two Thrillist lists of the country's best burritos.

== Description ==
La Bonita: Food for the People is a small chain of casual Mexican restaurants based in Portland. The family-owned business has fast counter service, serving burritos, chilaquiles, pozole, tacos, and tamales. Its menu also includes chicken enchiladas, horchata, quesadillas, tortas, tostadas, chimichangas, beef tongue, machaca, chile rellenos, menudo, beans, and rice. The breakfast menu includes a breakfast burrito, huevos a la mexicana, and huevos rancheros. The restaurants' interiors have a "sunny" decor, and the Alberta Street exterior has a Diego Rivera-inspired mural of a reclining woman.

== History ==
The original restaurant opened on Alberta Street in northeast Portland's Concordia neighborhood. A second restaurant opened on Killingsworth in north Portland's Overlook neighborhood in 2011. The third restaurant opened on Division Street in southeast Portland's Hosford-Abernethy neighborhood in 2020, and has a seating capacity of 34. All three locations operated via takeout during the COVID-19 pandemic; as of May 2020, the original restaurant also offered delivery service. By April 2021, it had indoor dining, takeout, and delivery.

== Reception ==
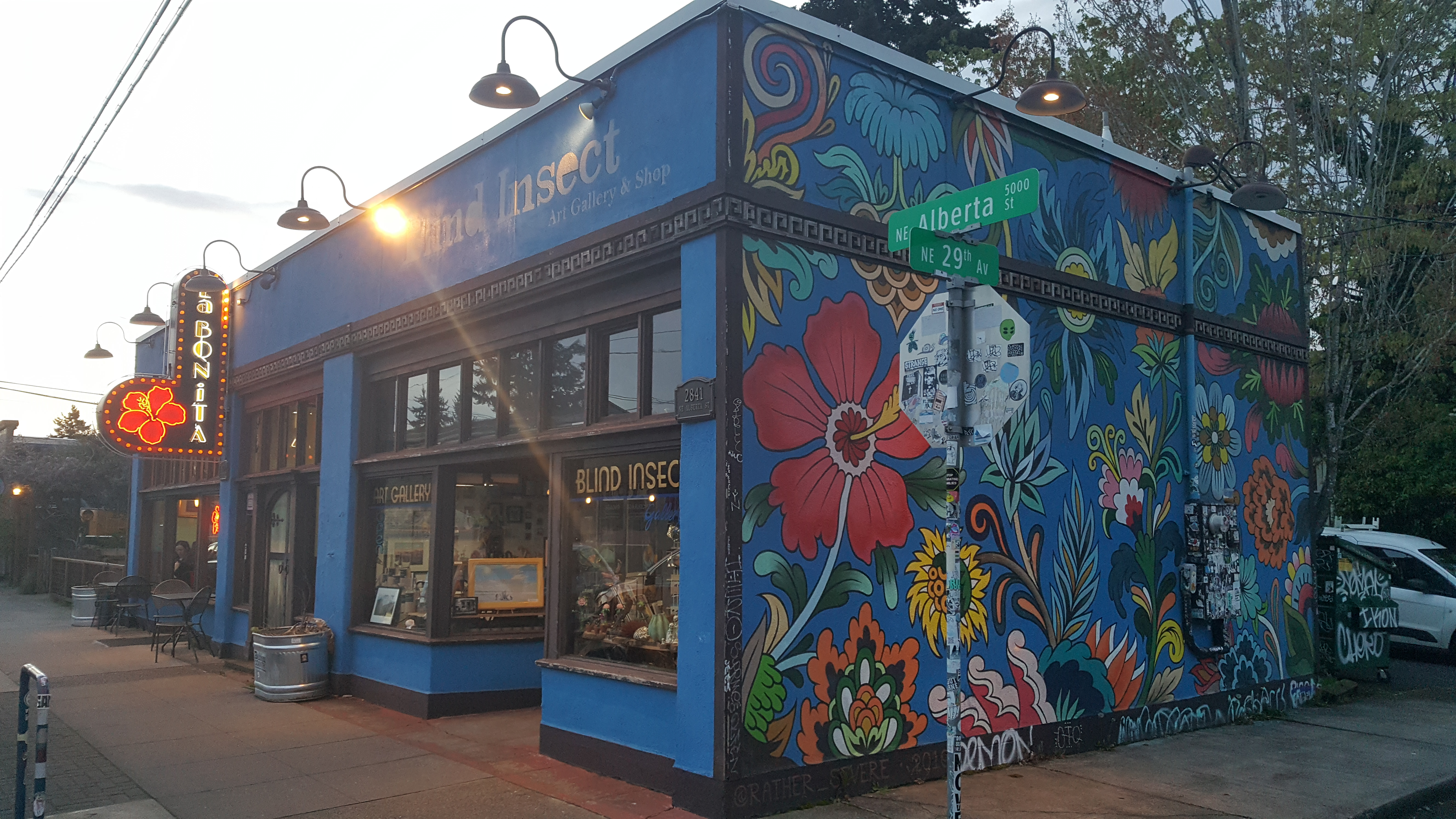
Exterior of the Alberta Street restaurant in 2022

Thrillist's Dan Gentile included La Bonita on a 2014 list of the 16 best burritos in the United States. Kristin Hunt included the chain on Thrillist's 2015 list of the country's 33 best burritos. La Bonita was included in The Oregonian's 2008 guide to "meals without borders", which said: "The straightforward Mexican food is a magnet to locals and wayfaring strangers." The newspaper's Michael C. Zusman included the restaurant's pozole in a 2009 overview of Portland's top pork dishes. Michael Russell and Samantha Bakall included La Bonita on the newspaper's 2015 and 2016 lists of the city's 10 best nachos and 25 best Mexican restaurants, respectively.

Nick Zukin included La Bonita on Willamette Week's 2016 list of Portland's nine best chile relleno burritos. In her 2019 Moon guidebook to Portland, Hollyanna McCollom said the food at the Alberta restaurant "is quick, inexpensive, and delicious". During the pandemic, Brooke Jackson-Glidden included La Bonita on Eater Portland's 2020 overview of Portland eateries with "knockout" tacos for takeout and delivery. She also included the Alberta restaurant in a 2021 overview of recommended eateries on Alberta. Nick Woo and Seiji Nanbu included La Bonita on a 2021 list of twelve "unreal" burritos in Portland, and said the restaurant "has become synonymous with quality fast-casual Mexican fare". Katrina Yentch included the restaurant in Eater Portland's 2022 list of eighteen "knockout spots" for affordable dining in the city. La Bonita was included in a similar list of Portland's best affordable restaurants in 2025.

== See also ==
- Hispanics and Latinos in Portland, Oregon
- List of casual dining restaurant chains
- List of Mexican restaurants
- List of restaurant chains in the United States
