= Astral (restaurant) =

Mexican restaurant in Portland, Oregon, U.S.

Coordinates: 45°31′40″N 122°38′21″W

- Interactive map of Astral

Restaurant information
- Chef: John Boisse
- Pastry chef: Lauren Breneman
- Food type: Mexican
- Location: 715 NE Lawrence Avenue, Portland, Oregon, 97232, United States

Astral (also known as Astral PDX) is a Mexican restaurant in Portland, Oregon. The restaurant started as a pop-up by spouses John Boisse and Lauren Breneman. Boisse and Breneman are the chef and pastry chef, respectively. It is now housed at Duality Brewing, in the northeast Portland portion of the Kerns neighborhood.

In 2023, the business was named one of Eater's twelve best new restaurants in the United States. Astral also won in the Best Chef Residency or Pop-Up category of Eater Portland's annual Eater Awards in 2023. The website's Krista Garcia included the business in a 2025 overview of Portland's best Mexican restaurants and food carts.

Michael Russell ranked Astral number 40 in The Oregonian's 2025 list of Portland's 40 best restaurants.

== See also ==
- Hispanics and Latinos in Portland, Oregon
- List of Mexican restaurants
