= Ki'ikibáa =

Mexican restaurant in Portland, Oregon, U.S.

Ki’ikibáa
- Interactive map of Ki’ikibáa

Restaurant information
- Established: 2022
- Owners: Manuel "Manny" Lopez; Suny Parra Castillo
- Food type: Mexican
- Location: 3244 Northeast 82nd Avenue, Portland, Multnomah, Oregon, 97220, United States
- Coordinates: 45.5462°N 122.5786°W

Ki'ikibáa is a Mexican restaurant in Portland, Oregon, United States. Spouses Manuel "Manny" Lopez and Suny Parra Castillo opened the restaurant in late 2022, on 82nd Avenue in northeast Portland's Madison South neighborhood. Specializing in Yucatecan cuisine, Ki'ikibáa has garnered a positive reception and was named Restaurant of the Year for 2023 by The Oregonian.

== Description ==
The Yucatecan restaurant Ki'ikibáa (Mayan for "delicious food") operates in the Madison Heights Plaza complex on 82nd Avenue in northeast Portland's Madison South neighborhood.

The menu includes: burritos; panuchos, or tortillas stuffed with a black bean puree, lettuce, pickled onion, and meat such as cochinita pibil; choch (Yucatecan blood sausage) with black beans; and relleno negro, or pork meat loaf with hard-boiled egg, served with turkey in a broth with chilies.

The restaurant has also served chicken tenders, quesadillas, poc chuc, salbutes, tamales, and frijol con puerco, or pork and beans. Tamales are available with banana leaf or corn husks.

== History ==
Established in late 2022, spouses Manuel "Manny" Lopez and Suny Parra Castillo opened Ki'ikibáa in the space that previously housed La Parilla.

== Reception ==
Ki'ikibáa was named Restaurant of the Year for 2023 by The Oregonian. The newspaper's Michael Russell recommended the panuchos with cochinita pibil, the rellenos (blanco or negro), and the carne asada burritos. Russell also included the frijol con puerco in The Oregonian's list of Portland's ten best dishes of 2024. He ranked the business number 20 in the newspaper's 2025 list of Portland's 40 best restaurants.

Katherine Chew Hamilton included the restaurant in Portland Monthly's 2023 overview of the city's best Mexican cuisine. Krista Garcia included the business in the magazine's 2025 overview of the best tamales in the metropolitan area. Lindsay D. Mattison included Ki'ikibáa in Tasting Table's 2023 list of Portland's forty best restaurants. Willamette Week's Andrea Damewood said the restaurant's location "is nothing to write home about" but the food "will have you sending cross-town postcards raving about lunch".

Nick Woo and Janey Wong included the business in Eater Portland's 2023 overview of 14 recommended eateries for "gargantuan" stuffed burritos in the city. Krista Garcia called Ki'ikibáa "colorful" in the website's 2024 list of the city's "standout" Mexican restaurants and food carts. She also included the business in a 2025 overview of Portland's best Mexican eateries. The business was also included in Time Out Portland's 2025 list of the city's eighteen best restaurants.

== See also ==
- Hispanics and Latinos in Portland, Oregon
- List of Mexican restaurants
