= Mi Mero Mole =

Defunct Mexican restaurant in Portland, Oregon, U.S.

Restaurant information
- Established: 2011
- Closed: July 3, 2020
- Owner: Nick Zukin
- Food type: Mexican
- Location: 5026 Southeast Division Street; 32 Northwest 5th Avenue, Portland, Oregon, United States
- Website: mmmtacospdx.com

Mi Mero Mole was a Mexican restaurant with two locations in Portland, Oregon, United States.

== Description ==
The restaurant served Mexican cuisine such as burritos, guisados, moles, quesadillas, tacos, and tortillas. The restaurant also served breakfast on weekdays, as of 2019.

== History ==
The original Mi Mero Mole opened on Division Street in southeast Portland's Richmond neighborhood in 2011. Owner Nick Zukin opened a second location in the Old Town Chinatown neighborhood in 2014. The Division restaurant closed in 2017, and the Old Town Chinatown restaurant closed on July 3, 2020, during the COVID-19 pandemic. Zukin had estimated that business was reduced by as much as 80 percent during the pandemic. The restaurant was operating via pickup and delivery, as of April 2020.

The restaurant offered "all you can eat" tacos; the record for most eaten was 14, as of 2016. Zukin received some media attention for his controversial social media interactions.

== Reception ==
Mi Mero Mole won the best guisados category in Michael Russell's 2018 list of The Oregonian's "8 best tacos within striking distance" of downtown Portland. The restaurant was a favorite of the Unipiper, as of 2020.

== See also ==
- COVID-19 pandemic in Portland, Oregon
- Hispanics and Latinos in Portland, Oregon
- Impact of the COVID-19 pandemic on the restaurant industry in the United States
- List of restaurant chains in the United States
- List of Mexican restaurants
