= Tilt (restaurant) =

Defunct restaurant in Portland, Oregon, U.S.

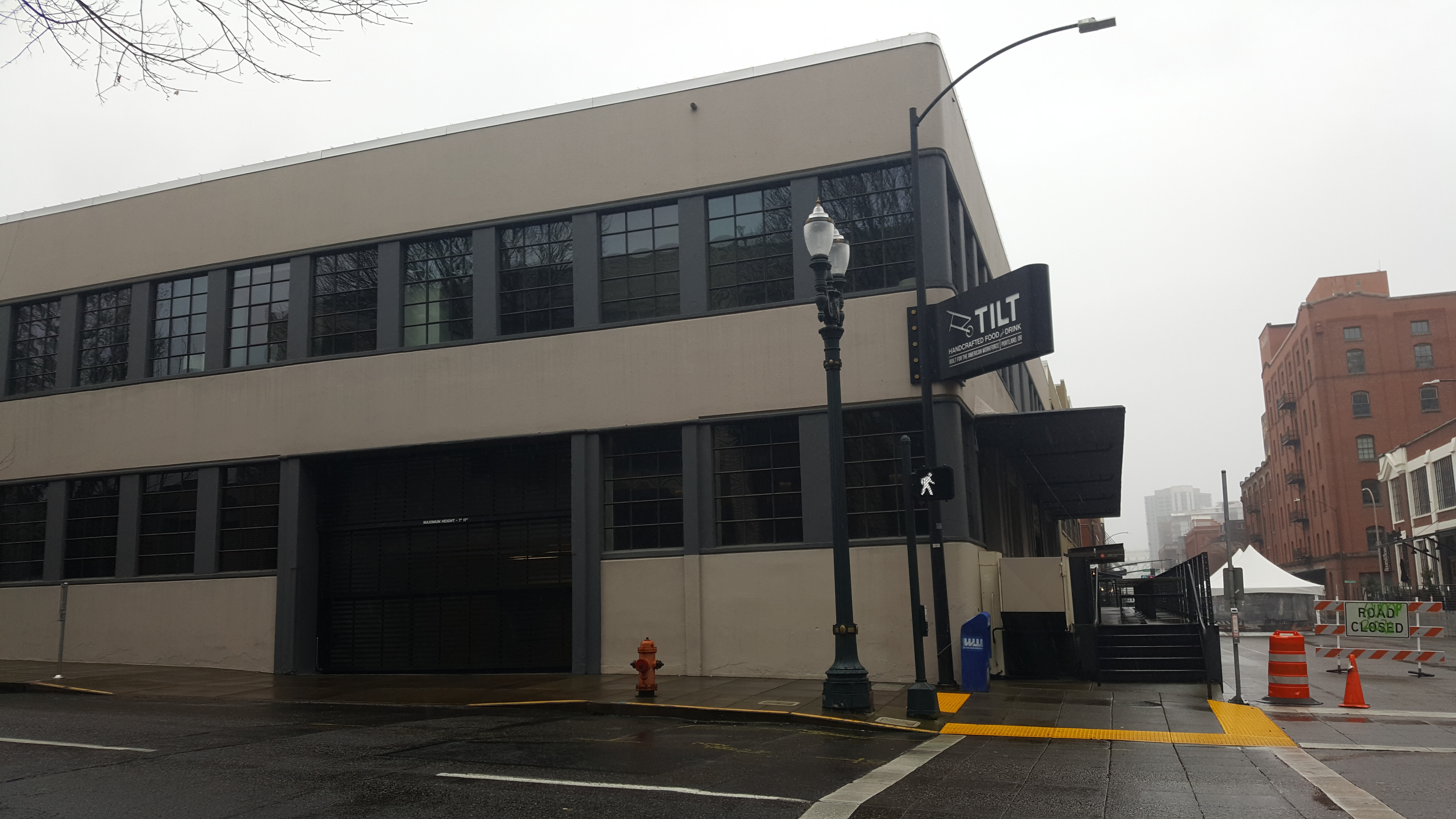
- Exterior of the restaurant in the Pearl District, 2021
- Interactive map of Tilt

Restaurant information
- Owners: Octavian and Brittany Jurj
- Location: Portland, Multnomah, Oregon, United States
- Coordinates: 45.55940°N 122.70233°W
- Website: tiltitup.com

Tilt was a hamburger restaurant with multiple locations in Portland, Oregon, United States.

== Description ==
Tilt's menu included burgers, sandwiches, house-made jalapeño tots, French fries, pies, and pie milkshakes. The Island Trucker burger had a beef patty with honey-cured ham, beer-battered onion rings, grilled pineapple, Swiss cheese, and teriyaki. The business also served biscuits and gravy with bacon and pork. The last word cocktail had gin, Chartreuse, and maraschino liqueur, and the Second Amendment had rum, Aperol, lemon, cinnamon, and bitters. The Peanut Butter, Cookies and Cream, Pie Milkshake had a full slice of pie blended into the drink. The family-operated business' motto was "handcrafted food, built for the American workforce".

The business operated in three locations. Fodor's called the Pearl District restaurant a "slightly snazzier but still informal outpost of a classic blue-collar burger joint in Portland's industrial Swan Island neighborhood." The guide book says, "On the right side of this cavernous order-at-the-counter space, there's a full bar as well as a coffee counter serving high-quality Ristretto Roasters espresso drinks. There's ample seating on the patio, a former loading dock." Lonely Planet said the restaurant next to the Burnside Skatepark was "committedly industrial-chic" with "raw-concrete pillars [and] shop-rags for napkins".

== History ==
Octavian and Brittany Jurj opened the original Tilt on Swan Island, in the Overlook, Portland, Oregon neighborhood, in 2012. In 2013, the restaurant announced plans to open a second location in the Pearl District. The restaurant opened in December. The business announced plans for a third location in February 2014. Following a legal dispute and a year renovating the RJ Templeton Building, Tilt announced plans to instead open at the Yard, in the northeast Portland part of the Kerns neighborhood. The restaurant opened next to the Burnside Skatepark on August 13, 2018.

Tilt was featured on the fourth episode of the first season of the Food Network series The Grill Dads. The Swan Island restaurant was replaced by Tito's Taquitos. The Pearl District location closed c. 2020. Toro Mexican Kitchen opened in the space in 2023. Andi Prewitt of Willamette Week said Tilt's "dark, industrial aesthetics are gone".

== Reception ==
Fodor's recommended the Island Trucker. In 2014, Chris Onstad of the Portland Mercury said Tilt was "hugely successful".

== See also ==
- List of hamburger restaurants
