= Tamale Boy =

Mexican restaurant chain in the U.S. state of Oregon

Restaurant information
- Owner: Jaime Soltero Jr.
- Food type: Mexican
- Location: Portland; Happy Valley, Oregon, United States
- Website: tamaleboy.com

Tamale Boy is a Mexican restaurant chain with multiple locations in the Portland, Oregon metropolitan area, in the United States.

== Description ==
The menu has included tamales, burritos, enchiladas, mole, and pozoles.

== History ==
Initially operating as a food cart, Tamale Boy opened as a brick and mortar restaurant on Northeast Dekum in the Woodlawn neighborhood in 2014. In 2016, a second location opened on Russell Street in the north Portland part of the Eliot neighborhood. In 2020, owner Jaime Soltero Jr. announced plans to expand into a food hall in Happy Valley. In 2022, Soltero announced plans to relocate the business's headquarters from Portland to Tigard. Tamale Boy also caters large events.

== Reception ==
Michelle DeVona and Brooke Jackson-Glidden included Tamale Boy in Eater Portland's 2021 list of "13 Dynamite Dog-Friendly Bars and Restaurants in Portland". Jackson-Glidden also included the Dekum location in a 2022 list of "Where to Find Tasty Tamales in Portland and Beyond" and wrote, "Likely the most famous spot in Portland for tamales, Tamale Boy’s wide range of both Oaxacan and Northern Mexican variations make it a local favorite." Krista Garcia included the business in Portland Monthly's 2025 overview of the best tamales in the metropolitan area. Tamale Boy was a finalist in the Best Catering Service category of Willamette Week's annual 'Best of Portland' readers' poll in 2025.

== See also ==
- Hispanics and Latinos in Portland, Oregon
- List of Mexican restaurants
