= Güero (restaurant) =

Mexican restaurant in Portland, Oregon, U.S.

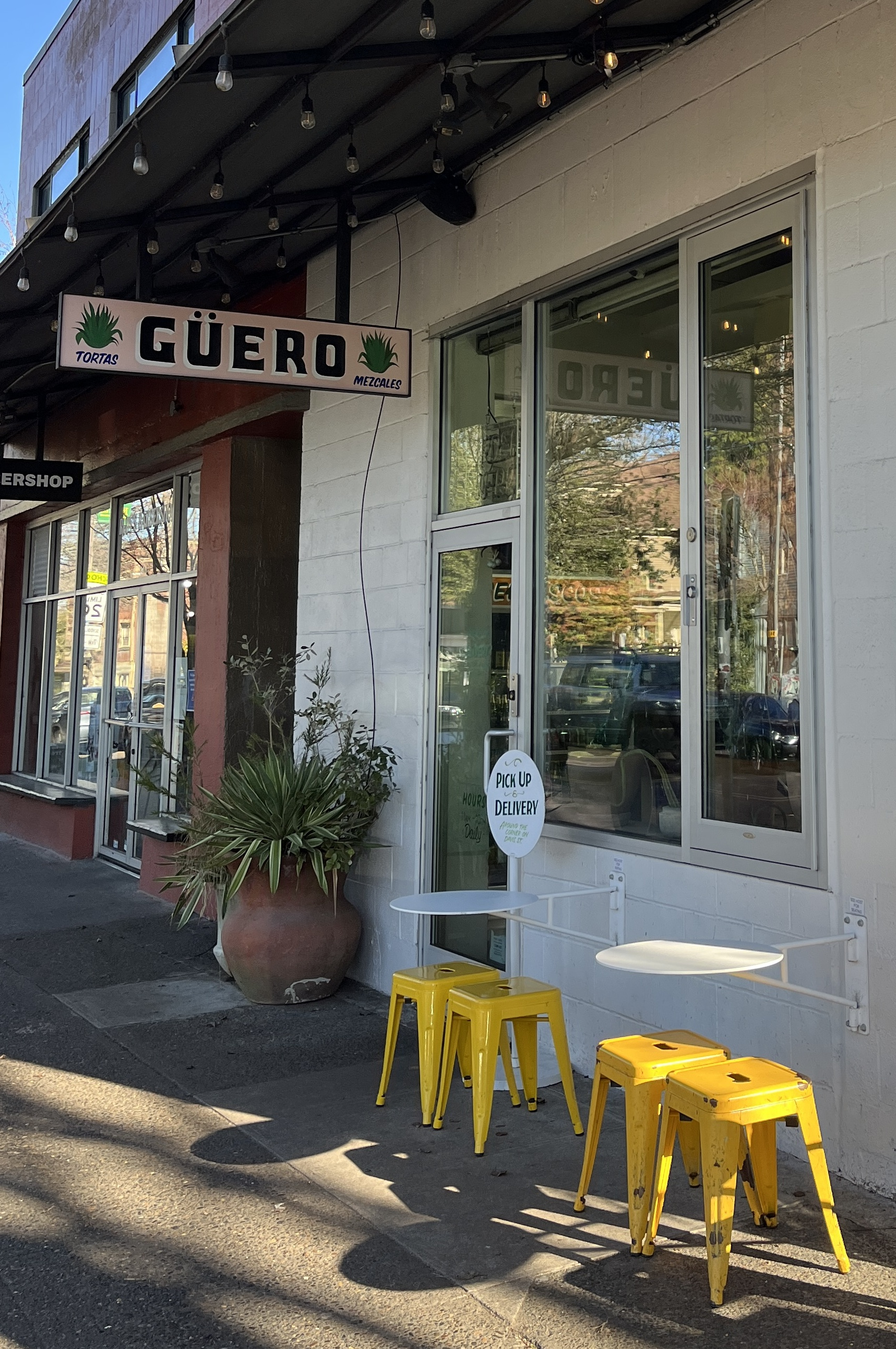
- The restaurant's exterior, 2025
- Interactive map of Güero

Restaurant information
- Established: 2017
- Food type: Mexican
- Location: 200 Northeast 28th Avenue, Portland, Multomah, Oregon, 97232, United States
- Coordinates: 45.5245°N 122.6370°W
- Website: www.guerotortas.com

Güero is a restaurant serving Mexican cuisine in Portland, Oregon's Kerns neighborhood, in the United States.

== Description ==
The restaurant specializes in tortas.

== History ==
The restaurant opened in February 2017.

== Reception ==
Güero was named "Portland's 2017 Rising Star restaurant" by The Oregonian contributor Ben Waterhouse. Michael Russell ranked the business number 34 in the newspaper's 2025 list of Portland's 40 best restaurants.

The Portland Mercury included Güero in a 2019 overview of the city's 50 "best multi-cultural restaurants and food carts". It was a runner-up in the Best Mexican Restaurant category of Willamette Week's annual 'Best of Portland' readers' poll in 2022. The dish called The Bowl was included in Willamette Week's 2026 list of the city's best "cheap eats".

The business was included in Time Out Portland's 2025 list of the city's eighteen best restaurants. Krista Garcia included the business in Eater Portland's 2025 overview of Portland's best Mexican restaurants and food carts.

== See also ==
- Hispanics and Latinos in Portland, Oregon
- List of Mexican restaurants
