= Milagro (theatre) =

Latino arts and cultural center in Portland, Oregon, US

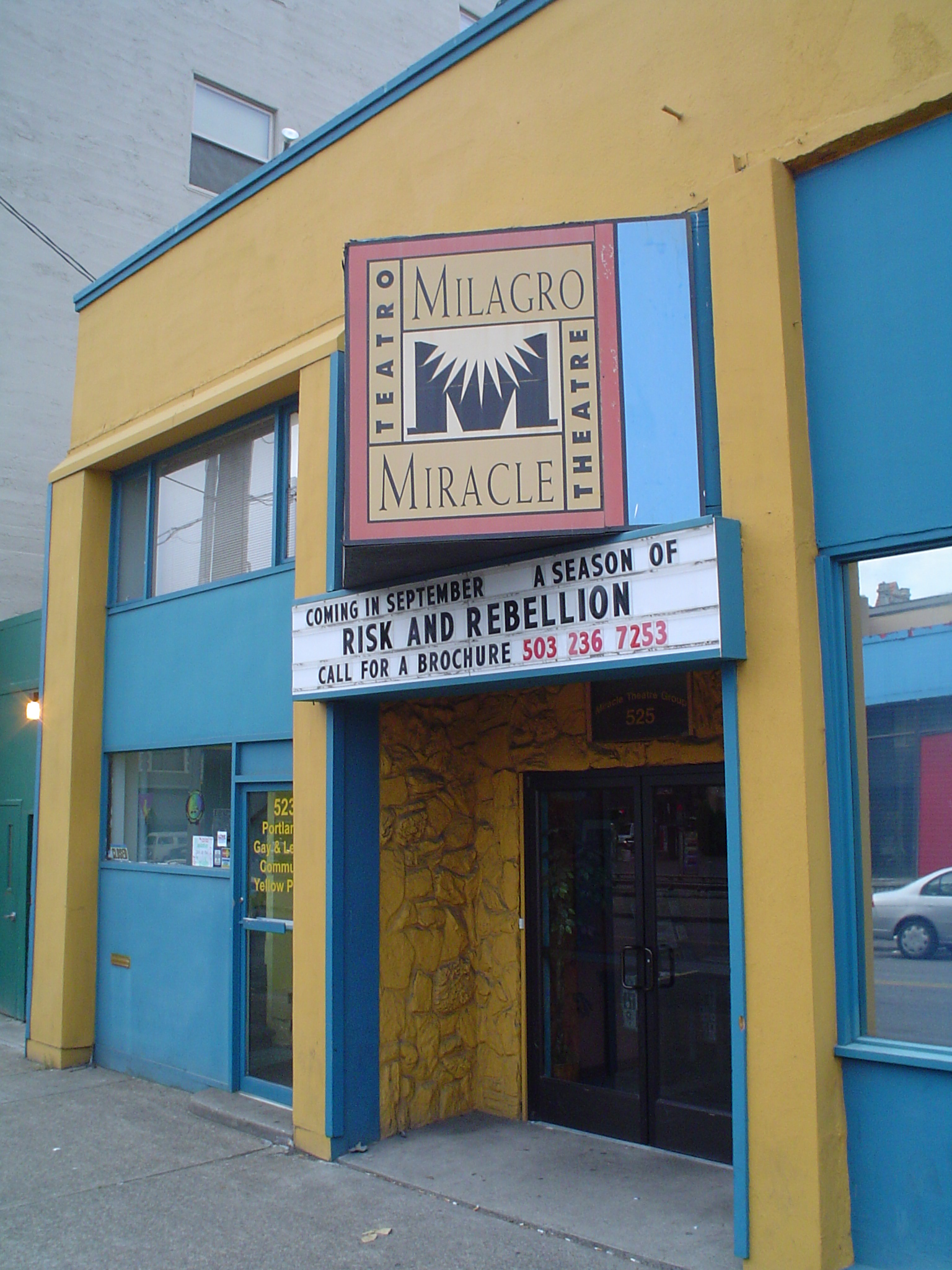
El Centro Milagro in SE Portland.

Milagro, sometimes referred to as Milagro Theatre or Teatro Milagro, formerly as Miracle Theatre or Miracle Theatre Group, is the premier Latino arts, culture and heritage organization in the Pacific Northwest. Its home is in Portland, Oregon, United States. It was founded in 1985.

The theatre produces a mainstage season from around September to May every year, complimented by several smaller events and community engagement activities both at and outside of the El Centro Milagro building. Prior to 2019, a touring company known as Teatro Milagro operated, showing original productions in spanish and english internationally by partnering with schools and universities. The Teatro Milagro name has since been used to refer to the mainstage productions and the organization overall. In the 2020s, the touring company was reworked into the Arts Education Program, where teaching artists host classes and seminars based on programming from the mainstage.

Milagro also sponsors the annual Latino Artist Fund, which awards thousands of dollars a year to local artists.

== History ==
Milagro, then known as Miracle Theatre was founded in the year 1985 by José Eduardo González and Dañel Malán, who would become the Executive and Artistic Director, respectively. Milagro produced and featured Oedipus Rex as its first showing. Miracle Theatre continued to produce Greek tragedies and comedies for the next seven years. Apart from Greek Classic plays, Milagro also produced plays such as Roosters by Milcha Sanchez-Scott. Milagro's touring and educational projects began in 1989 with Pérez y Martina, a play adapted from a Puerto Rican/Mexican folktale. Up until 1992 Teatro Milagro presented both Hispanic plays, which were shown in the spring, and Greek plays, which were shown in the fall. However, in 1992 the theater fully dedicated themselves to creating and producing Hispanic works. Following 1992, Teatro Milagro has performed a variety of plays per year, alongside organizing the Hispanic Cultural Festival. This was up until the 8th annual and last festival occurred during 1995–1996.

Over the 2018–2019 season, Milagro had over 5,000 audience members in attendance performed over 85 times, and whilst they were on tour, Milagro held over 80 workshops, residencies, and performances in Oregon and 8 other states, reaching over 11,700 students in K–12 schools and colleges.

== Foundation ==
Originally Miracle Theatre was located at the Northwest Service Center where it stayed until the end of 1992. Milagro then decided to relinquish tenancy of the Northwest Service Center in favor of finding its own home. Over the next three years Milagro continued to produce a full season of productions utilizing other spaces throughout the region.

In 1995 Milagro found a new permanent home in Portland, Oregon. Milagro leased space in the Central Eastside Industrial District in which it built a 120-seat theater. They were able to set this up in just seven weeks, opening with the Día de los Muertos Festival. Eventually in December 1997, Milagro officially purchased the building and founded El Centro Milagro, Portland's first Latino cultural center, which allowed for expansion and independence.

== Teatro Milagro ==
In 1989, Miracle Theater created Teatro Milagro, a bilingual tour program for performing arts. It was co-founded by Executive and artistic director, Jose Gonzalez and Dañel Malan, respectively.

The program took national tours to partner with schools and universities to perform original bilingual works, and provide education and training in underserved areas. Student tickets to Milagro shows were often released for free or at a low cost. Theater and workshops covered a wide range of topics, including socio-economic disparities, racism, ecological and health inequality, and loss of cultural identity. Milagro worked with schools and social services agencies to raise awareness and address the key issues facing the Latin community.

In 2019, Teatro Milagro took its last tour. In the 2020s, the remains of Teatro Milagro became the new Milagro Arts Education program, which instead has school groups travel to see shows on the mainstage at El Centro Milagro, and/or have Teaching Artists travel to schools to lead workshops and seminars related to the themes and content of a particular mainstage program.

== Archives ==
Milagro collaborated with The Oregon Multicultural Archives (OMA) for the purpose of preserving records integral to the history of the theater. Milagro's full archived record consisted of 27 cubic feet of material documenting theater management and board, architectural history, public and educational efforts, staff and artists, finances, and creative programs. In addition to textual documents, the collection includes photographic and audiovisual medias and materials. To make the records accessible to the public, OMA copied and condensed Milagro's records to be presented alongside those of the Obo Addy Legacy Project, a West African dance and music group, also established in Portland, Oregon. The organizations were chosen to be archived together due to their same purpose of providing voices and representation of their respective cultural groups. The exhibit included viewing stations so visitors could watch performance clips. The exhibit was on view from April to September 2014.

== See also ==
- Culture of Portland, Oregon
- Hispanics and Latinos in Portland, Oregon
