= La Calaca Comelona =

Defunct Mexican restaurant in Portland, Oregon, U.S.

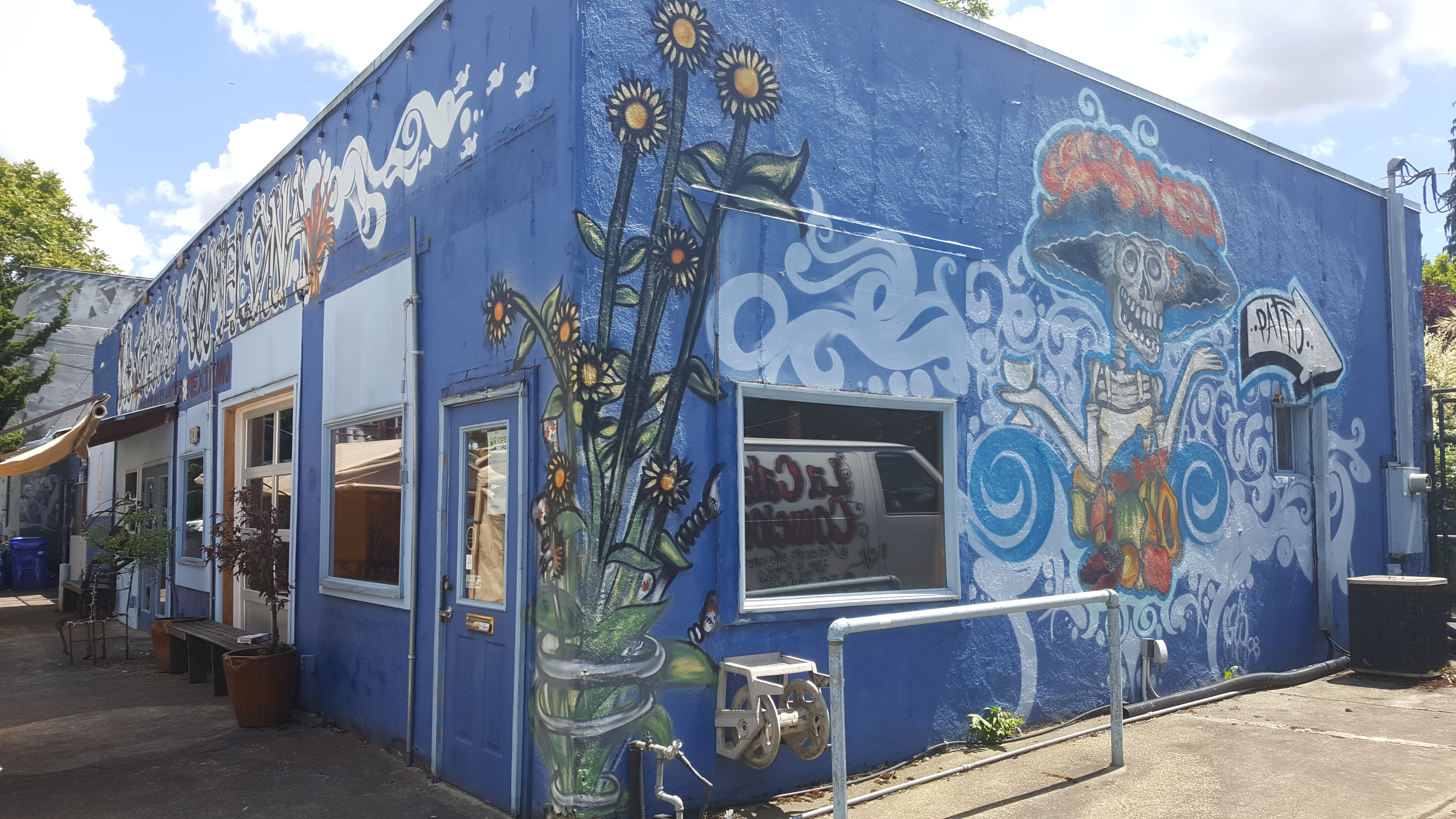
- The restaurant's exterior in 2021
- Interactive map of La Calaca Comelona

Restaurant information
- Owner: Patricia Cabrera
- Chef: Patricia Cabrera
- Food type: Mexican
- Location: 2304 Southeast Belmont Street, Portland, Multnomah, Oregon, 97214, United States
- Coordinates: 45.5162°N 122.6422°W
- Website: lacalacacomelona.com

La Calaca Comelona was a Mexican restaurant in Portland, Oregon, United States.

== Description ==
La Calaca Comelona (English: "The Hungry Skeleton") was a Mexican restaurant on Belmont Street in southeast Portland's Buckman neighborhood. Patricia Cabrera was the chef and owner. The restaurant had skeletal decor and a "secret" garden. According to Michael Russell of The Oregonian, the restaurant was "known for its lush back patio, house-made salsas, and authentic dishes representing multiple regions of Mexico". The menu included three varieties of alambre, mole, papitas, quesadillas, and tacos.

== Reception ==
In her 2016 overview of Portland's 25 best Mexican restaurants, Samantha Bakall of The Oregonian described La Calaca Comelona as "regional Mexican food and good cocktails in a restaurant as obsessed with skeletons as a Dia De Los Muertos parade".

== See also ==
- Hispanics and Latinos in Portland, Oregon
- List of defunct restaurants of the United States
- List of Mexican restaurants
