= El Grito Portland =

Annual festival in Portland, Oregon, U.S.

- Logo for the 2026 festival
- Frequency: Annually
- Location: Portland, Oregon
- Country: United States
- Website: elgritoportland.com

El Grito Portland is an annual celebration in Portland, Oregon, United States. The event commemorates the independence of Mexico and other Latin American nations, and marks the start of National Hispanic Heritage Month. It has been held for more than two decades. It is billed as "the largest, fully Latinx-owned, organized and executed event in the Northwest". The event showcases the cultures and traditions of various Latin American nations and features dancing, food, handicraft, music, and other family-friendly activities. In addition to cultural programming, the event has had a health and resource fair as well as marketplace featuring Latin-owned businesses. According to KOIN, the festival celebrates the indepdence of seven nations: Chile, Costa Rica, El Salvador, Guatemala, Honduras, Mexico, and Nicaragua.

The event is organized by Victoria Lara and employees of her company Lara Media, which was established in 2000. Lara has described the festival as "the largest El Grito celebration on the west coast ". The 2022 event was held at the Moda Center. Approximately 1,000 students from Portland Public Schools were expected to attend. The 2024 festival was held at Rose Quarter Commons. The 2025 festival was held at Rose Quarter Commons and its Poderosas Pavillion featured twelve Latina-owned businesses selling art, clothing, jewelry, and other products. Some organizers moved activities online because of federal immigration crackdowns. The two-day event in 2026 was held outside the Moda Center.

== See also ==
- Culture of Portland, Oregon
- Hispanics and Latinos in Portland, Oregon
- List of festivals in the United States
