= Smart Donkey =

Mexican restaurant in Portland, Oregon, U.S.

Smart Donkey Burreria

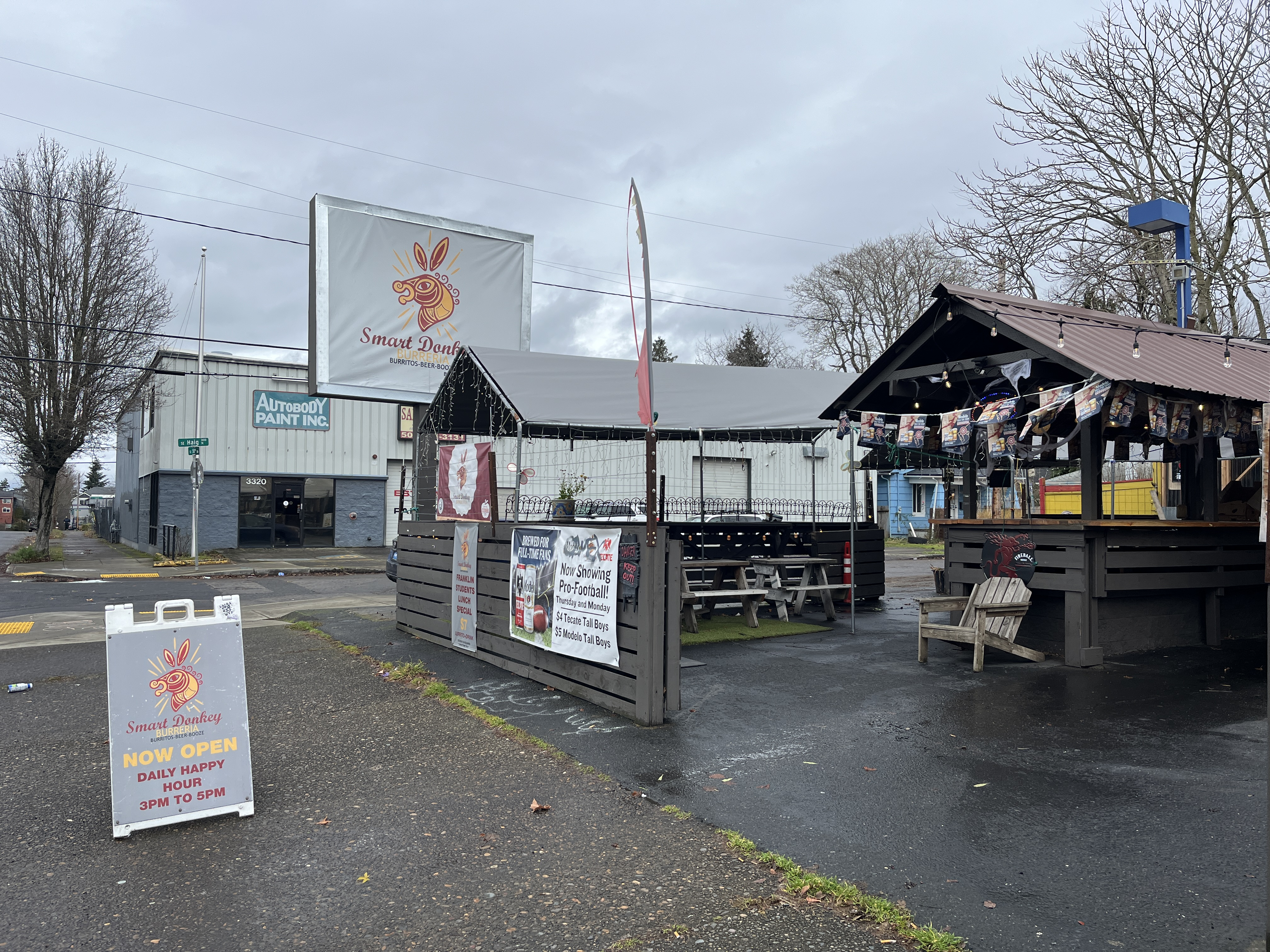
- The restaurant's exterior, 2024
- Interactive map of Smart Donkey Burreria

Restaurant information
- Owner: Oswaldo Bibiano
- Chef: Oswaldo Bibiano
- Food type: Mexican
- Location: 3420 Southeast 50th Avenue, Portland, Multnomah, Oregon, 97206, United States
- Coordinates: 45.4980°N 122.6110°W
- Website: smartdonkeypdx.com

Smart Donkey Burreria, or simply Smart Donkey, is a Mexican restaurant in Portland, Oregon. Chef Oswaldo Bibiano operates the food cart in southeast Portland's Richmond neighborhood, in a converted car wash. Smart Donkey has garnered a positive reception and was named one of the city's best new food carts of 2022 by The Oregonian.

== Description ==
The Mexican restaurant Smart Donkey operates on 50th Avenue in southeast Portland's Richmond neighborhood, near Foster-Powell. Eater Portland has described the space as "something like a single-cart pod and beer garden". Among burritos on the menu is the El Gordo, which has chicharron, chorizo, and potatoes, and the El Guapo, which has vegetables, pumpkin seeds, and avocado salsa. The El Hipster has kale and red cabbage braised in apple cider and red wine vinegar, and the Zumpango has Guerrero-style shredded beef. Drink options include draught beer and cider, micheladas, wine, and cocktails such as margaritas and mimosas.

== History ==
Chef Oswaldo Bibiano opened Smart Donkey in a space next to SuperDeluxe that was previously used as car wash.

== Reception ==
Writers for The Oregonian ranked Smart Donkey tenth in a list of Portland's best new food carts of 2022. The newspaper's Michael Russell described a "perfect" mean at the restaurant: "A burrito with barbacoa in the style of Guerrero, Bibiano's home state, plus a tall margarita and a lawn game played on the former car wash parking lot." Katherine Chew Hamilton included Smart Donkey in Portland Monthly's 2023 overview of the city's best Mexican cuisine.

Nick Woo and Janey Wong included Smart Donkey in Eater Portland's 2023 overview of fourteen recommended eateries for "gargantuan" stuffed burritos in the city. Brooke Jackson-Glidden and Maya MacEvoy included the business in the website's 2024 overview of "jaw-dropping" happy hours. In KOIN's 2024 overview of Portland's "top-rated" burritos, Aimee Plante said Smart Donkey had a rating of 4.8 on Yelp. The zumpango burrito was included in Willamette Week's 2026 list of the city's best "cheap eats".

== See also ==
- Hispanics and Latinos in Portland, Oregon
- List of Mexican restaurants
