= Teote =

Restaurant in Portland, Oregon, U.S.

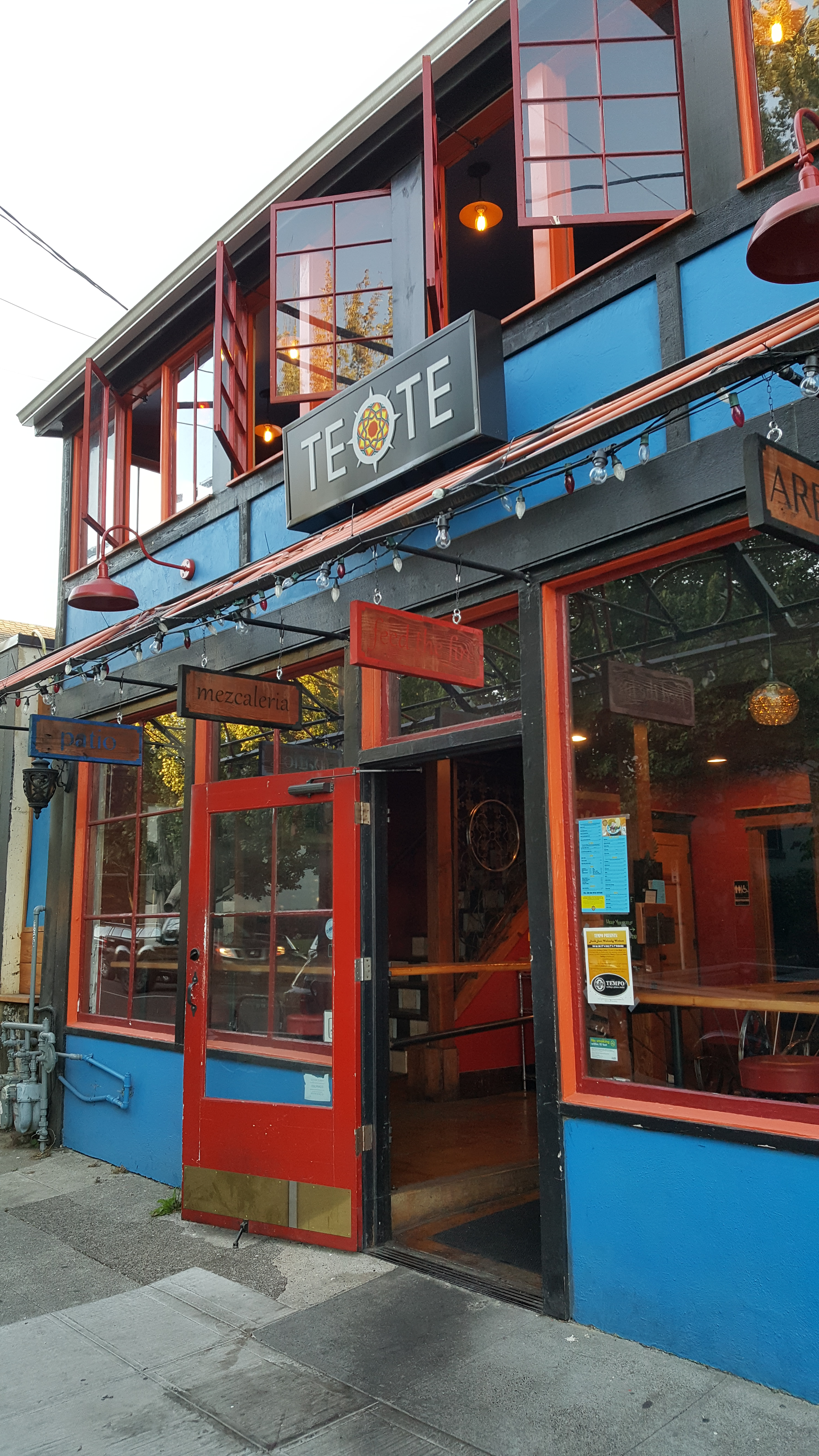
- Exterior of the southeast Portland restaurant, 2016

Restaurant information
- Established: 2013
- Food type: Latin American
- Location: Portland, Oregon, United States
- Website: teotepdx.com

Teote was a Latin American restaurant with multiple locations in Portland, Oregon.

== History ==
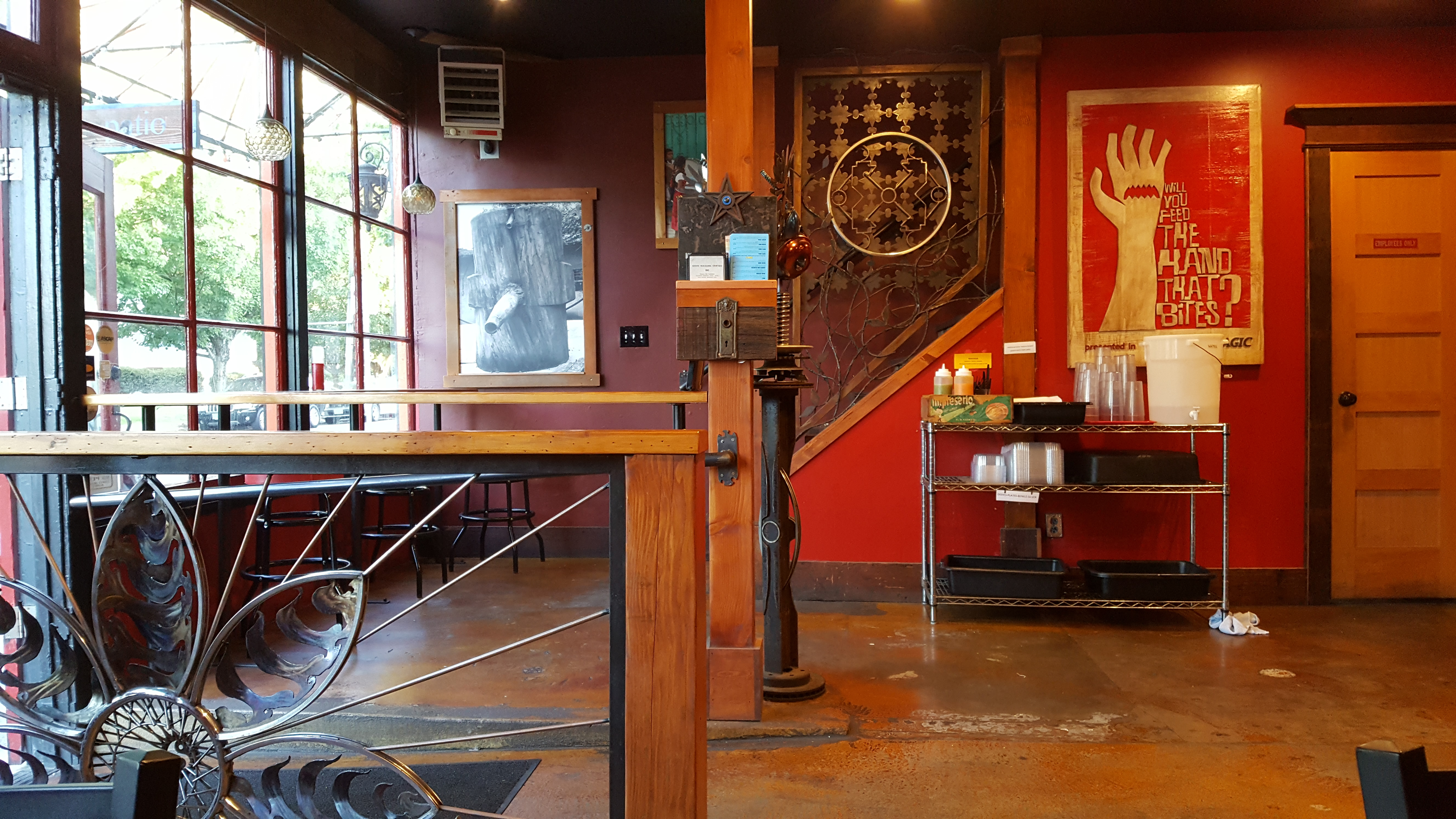
Interior of the southeast Portland restaurant in 2016

The original restaurant, also known as Teote Areperia, opened in July 2013. The Alberta location opened in 2018. Plans for a restaurant in Pine Street Market were confirmed in December 2018.

== Locations ==
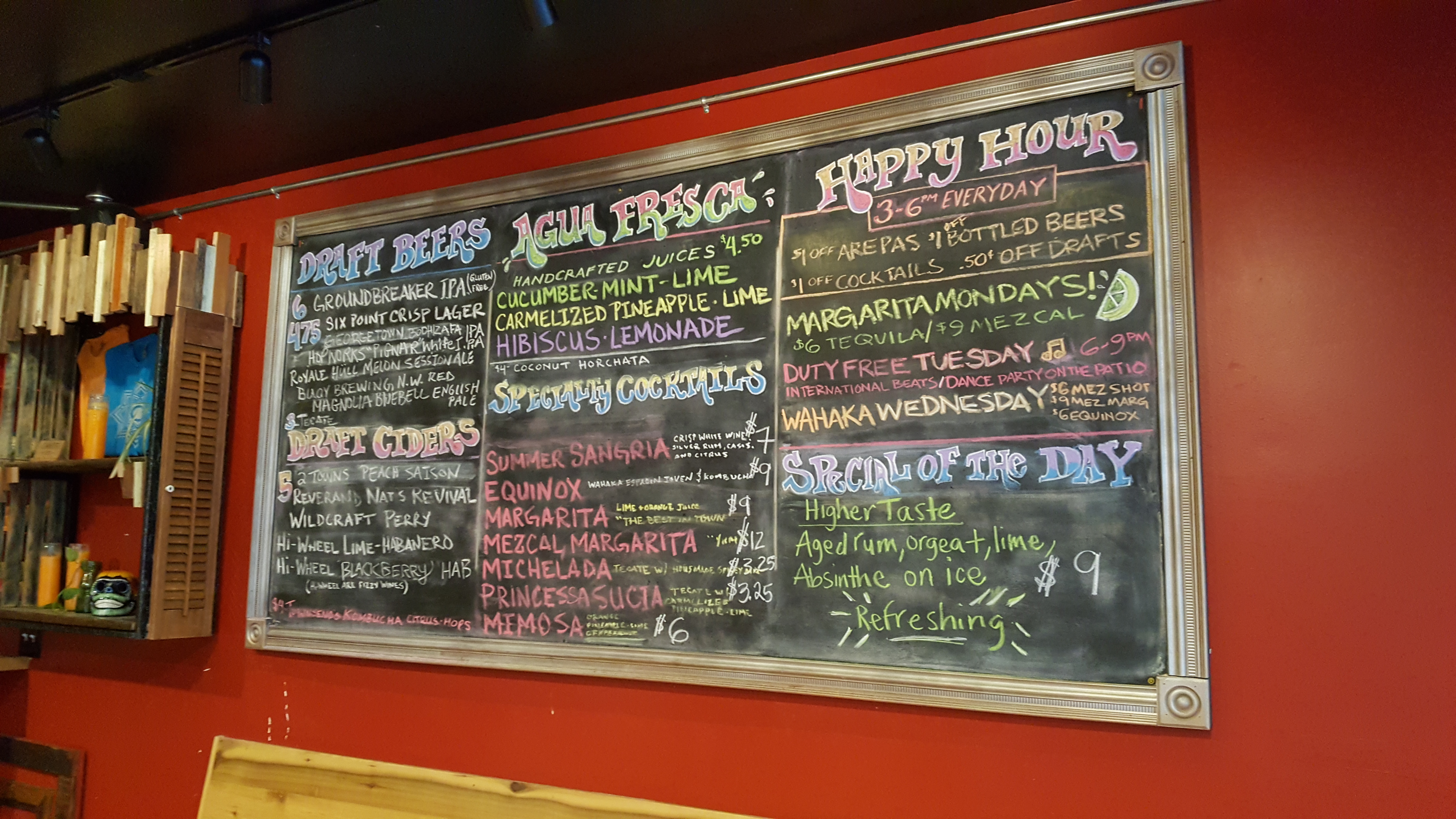
Menu on the wall, 2016

- Teote Outpost was located at 126 SW 2nd Avenue within the Pine Street Market in downtown Portland

=== Former ===
- Teote House Cafe was located at 1615 SE 12th Avenue in the Hosford-Abernethy neighborhood. The restaurant closed in 2023.
- Teote Mezcaleria was located at 2700 NE Alberta Street in the Concordia neighborhood. The restaurant closed in 2023.

== Reception ==
Teote received positive reviews.

== See also ==
- Hispanics and Latinos in Portland, Oregon
- List of defunct restaurants of the United States
- List of restaurant chains in the United States
