= Santa Fe Taqueria =

Defunct Mexican restaurant in Portland, Oregon, U.S.

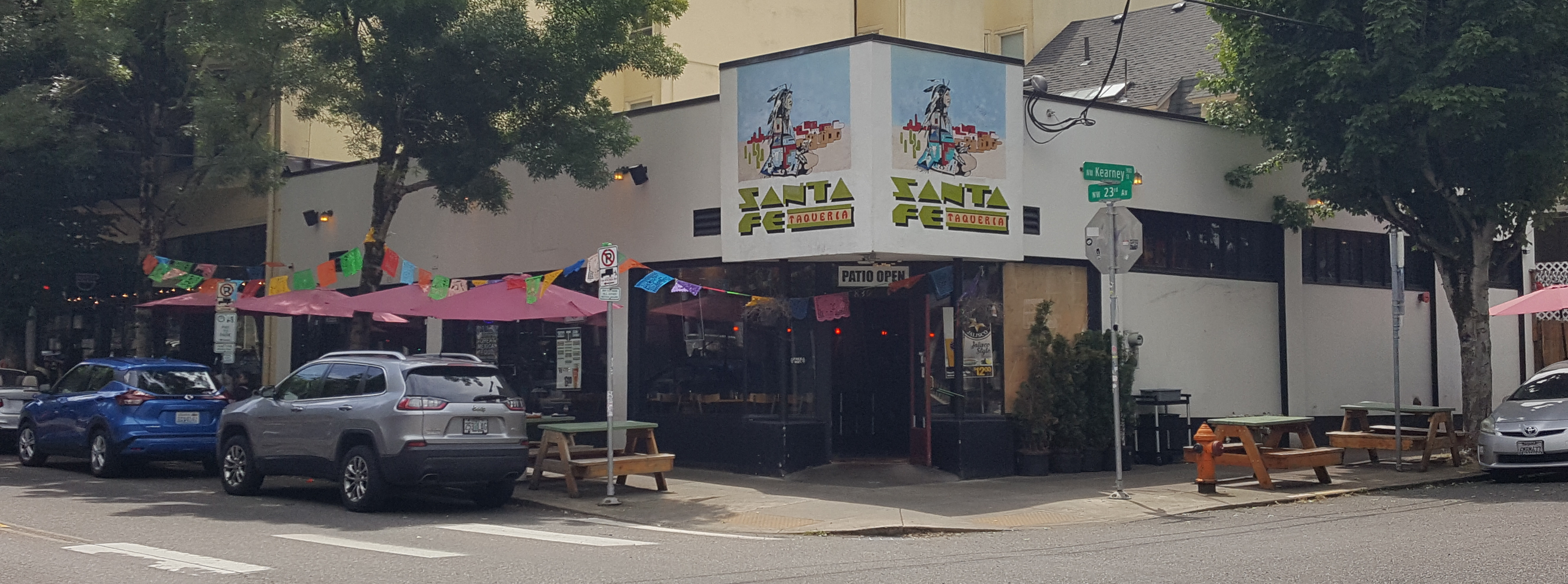
- The restaurant's exterior, 2022
- Interactive map of Santa Fe Taqueria

Restaurant information
- Established: 1990
- Closed: September 2024
- Owner: Danny Cardoso
- Food type: Mexican
- Location: 831 Northwest 23rd Avenue, Portland, Multnomah, Oregon, 97210, United States
- Coordinates: 45.5290°N 122.6987°W

Santa Fe Taqueria was a Mexican restaurant in Portland, Oregon, United States. Owner Danny Cardoso opened the restaurant on 23rd Avenue in northwest Portland's Northwest District in 1990, serving traditional cuisine such as burritos, enchiladas, nachos, tacos, and margaritas. The family-friendly taqueria garnered a positive reception, and is slated to close permanently on September 30, 2024.

== Description ==
The Mexican restaurant Santa Fe Taqueria operates on 23rd Avenue in northwest Portland's Northwest District. It has a large dining room and an attached cantina. The restaurant serves lunch and dinner, and in 2007, Christopher Reynolds of the Los Angeles Times called Santa Fe Taqueria "a tang of Southwest flavor amid much Northwestness".

=== Menu ===
According to Eater Portland, the taqueria serves Mexican food in the style of Puebla, where the owner's family is from. The menu includes Aztec Calendar dip, blue-corn chicken, burritos, enchiladas, flautas, nachos, tacos, horchata, and margaritas.

Vegan and vegetarian options for burritos, nachos, and tacos include ground Beyond Meat, jackfruit carnitas, soy chorizo in green sauce, or soy curls with onions and red sauce. Among blended and frozen margarita varieties are blood orange, guava, or passionfruit.

== History ==
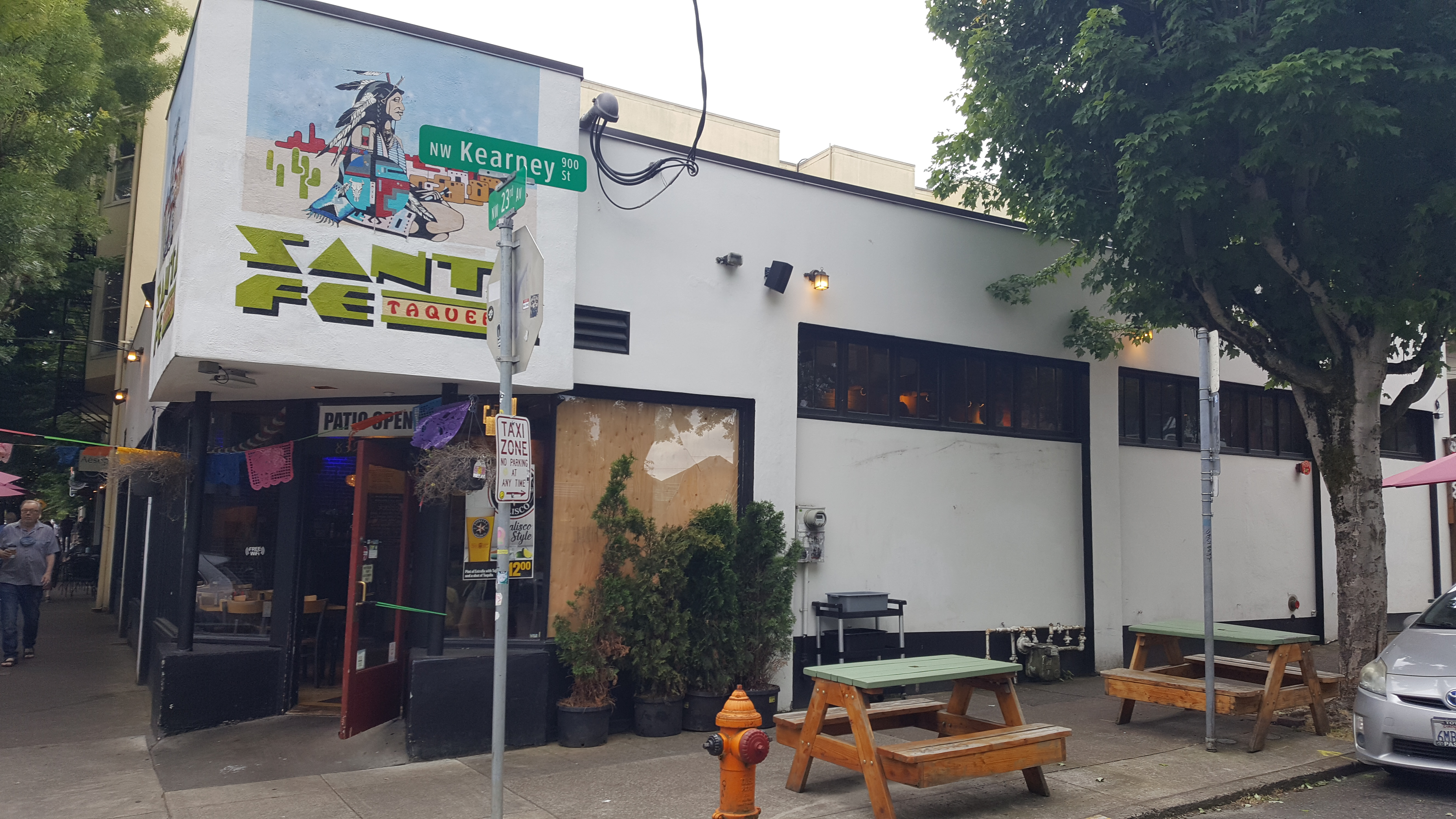
Exterior of the restaurant in 2022

Owner Danny Cardoso opened Santa Fe Taqueria in 1990; he also owned sibling establishments Mayas Taqueria (or Maya's Taqueria), which opened in 1986 and was later sold, as well as Aztec Willie's Taqueria, which opened in 1994. Yolanda Munos was the bar manager of Santa Fe Taqueria in 2020.

In November 2015, to commemorate its 25th anniversary, Santa Fe Taqueria hosted an event with free food, drink specials, and live music, as well as activities for children such as balloon modelling and face painting. As of 2017, children ate for free on Wednesdays after 5pm.

In 2020, during the COVID-19 pandemic, a parking-strip patio made of corrugated plastic walls was installed outside Sante Fe Taqueria, at a cost of approximately $6,000. The patio collapsed under the weight of snow in February 2021. The restaurant increased outdoor seating at times when there were indoor seating capacity restrictions.

On August 29, 2024, Cardoso announced plans to close the restaurant permanently on September 30. He said on social media: "I opened the first taqueria in the city of Portland (on) August 4, 1986 and now the window for exiting the food scene in Portland has opened up for me. I am eternally grateful and appreciative to all who have come through and supported me." A farewell party was held on September 25, where belongings like chairs, plates, and tables were put up for sale. The space was converted into a Dave's Hot Chicken location.

== Reception ==
Santa Fe Taqueria's horchata won in the Best Hangover Cure category of Willamette Week's 2009 "best nights" overview. In 2022, the business was among the 30 highest-rated Mexican restaurants in the city, according to Tripadvisor. The website gave ratings of 4 for food, 4 for service, 4 for value, and 3.5 for atmosphere, each on a scale of 5. In 2023, Waz Wu recommended Santa Fe Taqueria in Eater Portland's overview of the city's best vegan tacos, and Meira Gebel and Emily Harris included the business in Axios Portland's list of six restaurants for "standout" tacos.

== See also ==
- Hispanics and Latinos in Portland, Oregon
- List of Mexican restaurants
