= Por Que No =

Mexican restaurant in Portland, Oregon, U.S.

¿Por Qué No? Taqueria

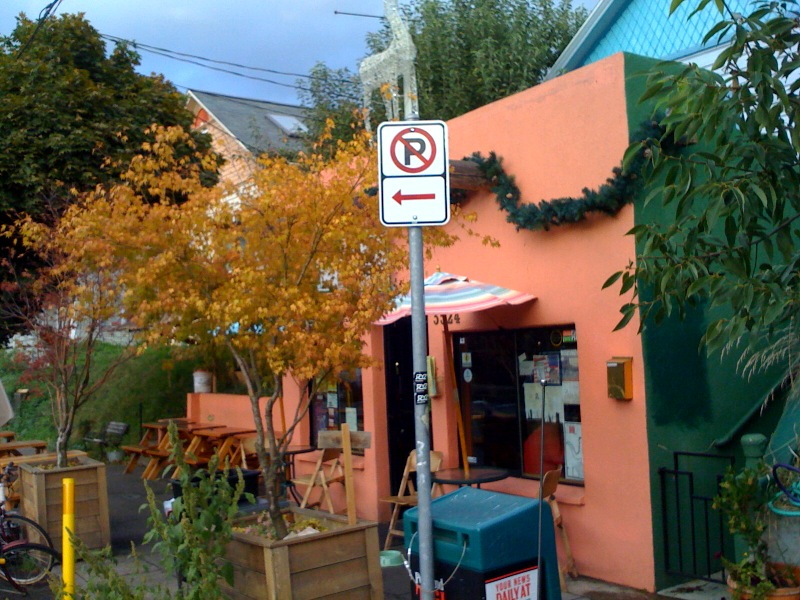
- Front exterior of the original restaurant, 2008
- Interactive map of ¿Por Qué No? Taqueria

Restaurant information
- Established: 2004
- Owner: Bryan Steelman
- Chef: Mark Saldaña (2005)
- Food type: Mexican
- Location: 3524 North Mississippi Avenue, Portland, Multnomah, Oregon, United States
- Coordinates: 45.5482°N 122.6754°W
- Other locations: 4635 Southeast Hawthorne Boulevard; 45.5122°N 122.6143°W
- Website: www.porquenotacos.com

¿Por Qué No? Taqueria, commonly referred to as Por Que No and sometimes stylized as ¿Por Que No?, is a small chain of taquerias owned by Bryan Steelman with two locations in Portland, Oregon, United States. The restaurant is known for its Mexican-style tacos, but also serves a variety of entrées such as enchiladas, quesadillas, rice bowls, salads, and tamales. The restaurant has garnered a positive reception.

== Description ==
¿Por Qué No? (English: Why not?) is a small taqueria chain with two locations owned by Bryan Steelman, who was inspired by the "hole-in-the-wall joints" he visited in Mexico. The original restaurant is in the Boise neighborhood in north Portland (3524 North Mississippi Avenue) and a second opened in the Hawthorne District of southeast Portland's Sunnyside neighborhood (4635 Southeast Hawthorne Boulevard).

Both restaurants often have queue lines, especially during good weather or happy hour, and on "Taco Tuesdays". In 2005, Willamette Week described the original restaurant as a "newish taqueria owned by a white couple, frequented by a largely—but by no means entirely—white clientele, and it charges higher-than-average taqueria prices." Nearly ten years later, the paper described it as "Nouveau-Portland comfort Mexican food".

=== Menu ===
The chain is known for its Mexican-style tacos with recipes originating from across the country, from the Oaxaca region to the Pacific Coast, and for its sustainable practices and seasonal ingredients. Por Que No is considered local food, with line-caught fish, pork by Oregon-based Carlton Farms, and tortillas handmade and chips fried on-site.

Taco filling options include barbacoa, calamari, carne asada, and cod. Larger entrées include enchiladas, quesadillas, rice bowls, salads, and tamale plates. Its "pollo verde" features chicken slow-cooked in tomatillo salsa and its tinga recipe includes shredded beef in a both instead of the traditional chicken or pork stew. Side dishes include fish ceviche, guacamole, a house salad with tomatillo-avocado dressing, and pinto beans. Beverages include margaritas, michelada, "cerveza roja" (michelada with Bloody Maria and Tecate beer), and various flavors of aguas frescas. The restaurant also serves SolPops paletas, or popsicles made with whole fruit.

== History ==
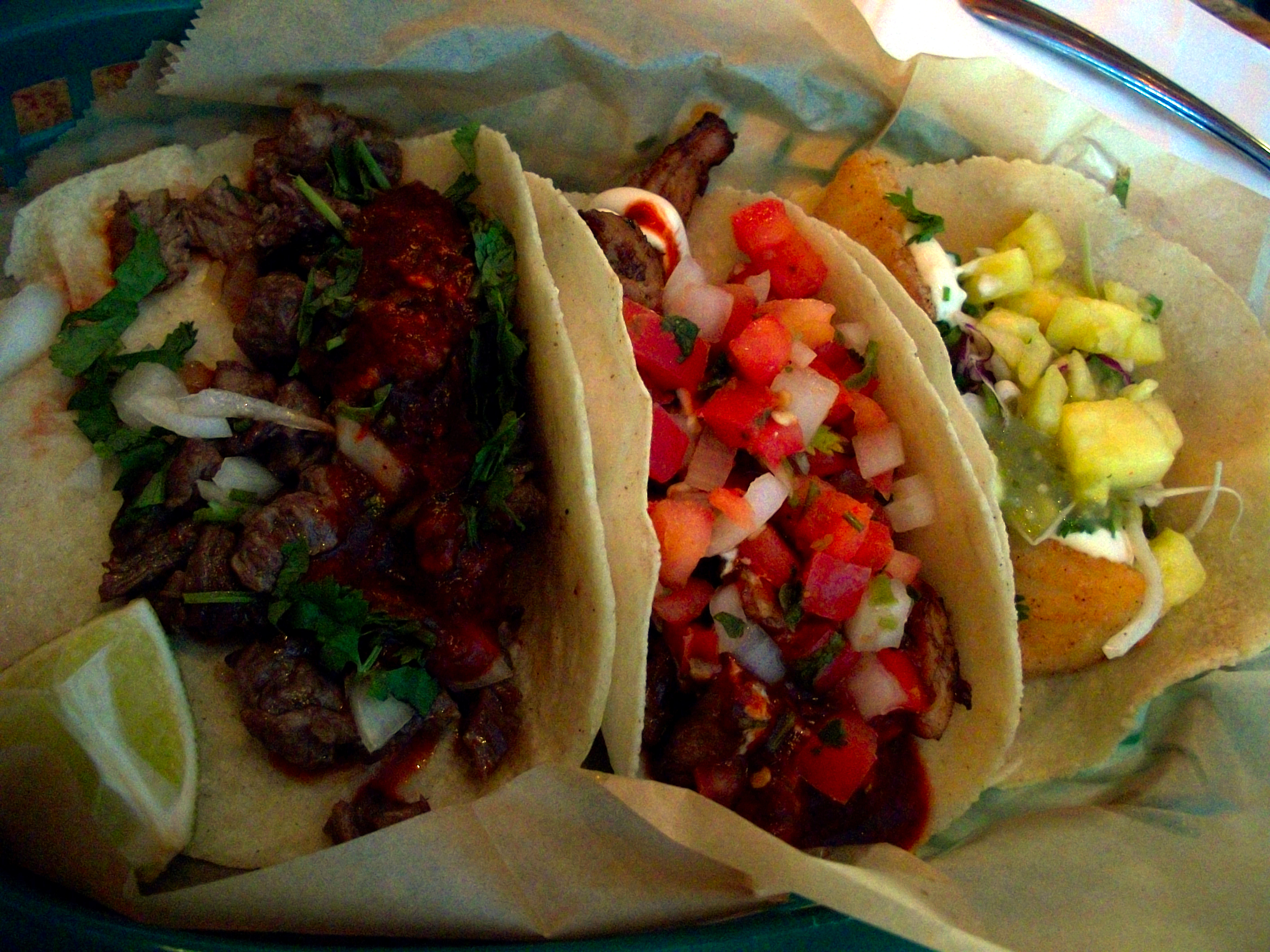
Three taco varieties, 2010

In 2009, Steelman received a grant from the Portland Development Commission (PDC) for construction of a "green" covered outdoor patio at the north Portland location. The project's design and development was led by Orange Design and Construction Company, with assistance from Allusa Architecture. Steelman used the opportunity to also install a green roof with assistance from the Bureau of Environmental Service's Ecoroof Program. Construction of the patio and ecoroof, which features vegetation and two solar water heating panels, occurred during April–May 2010. The same location closed for two months in 2013 for expansion and remodeling, during which the house above the restaurant was converted into a catering kitchen, an additional bathroom was added, and the downstairs seating capacity was increased.

As part of the COVID-19 pandemic, the company's "PQN Hawthorne" division received $388,000 in federally backed small business loans from Umpqua Bank as part of the Paycheck Protection Program. The company stated it would allow them to retain 54 jobs. The restaurant participated in Portland's Dumpling Week in 2026.

=== Community ===
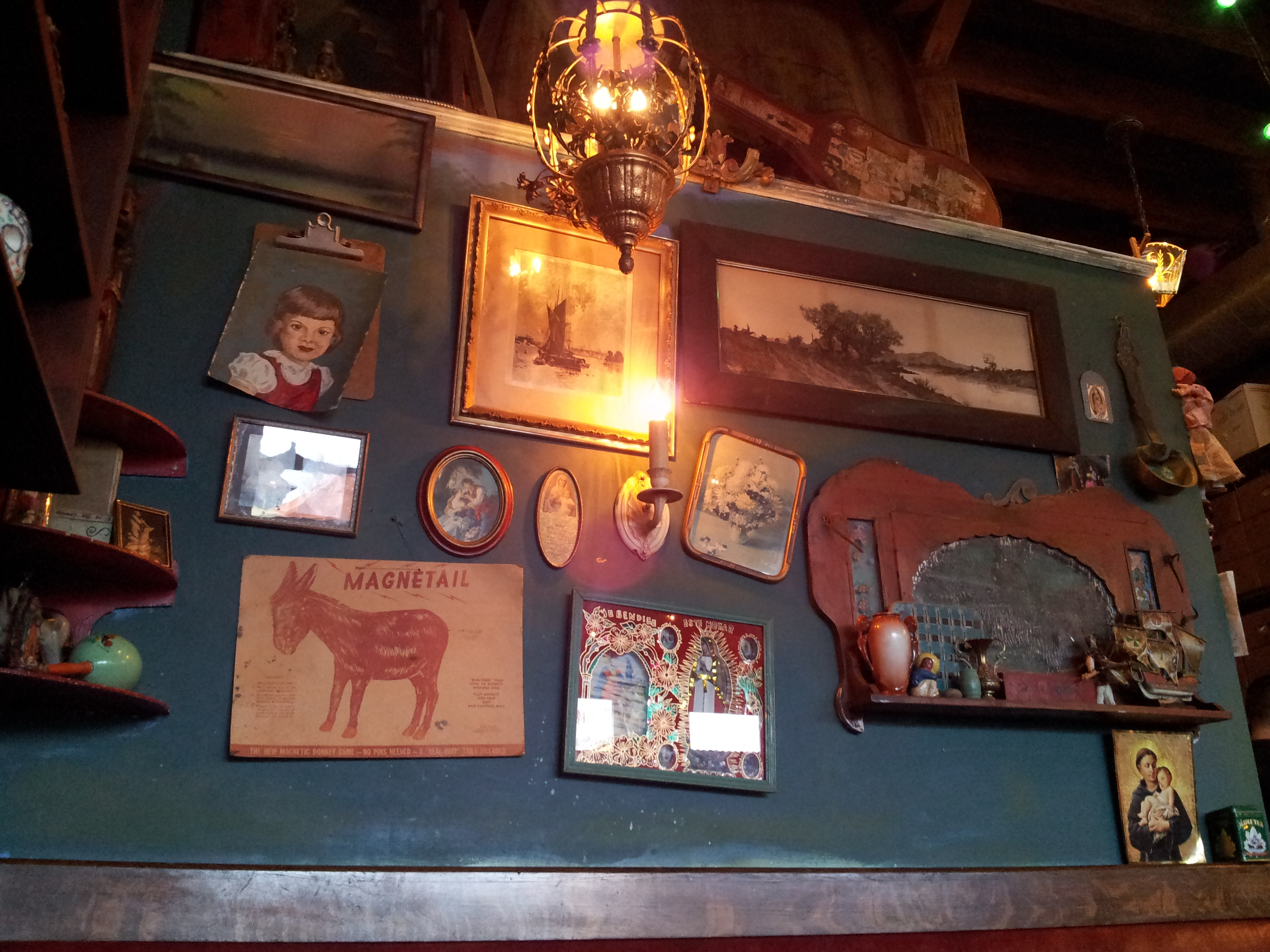
Interior of the Hawthorne restaurant, 2015

Por Que No has contributed to a variety of charitable organizations and fundraising campaigns, including the annual dine-out for Raphael House (which supports victims of domestic abuse), "Dining with Dignity" for Sisters of the Road, "Make It Pop" for the non-profit local summer music festival PDX Pop Now!, and Willamette Week's giving program "Give!Guide". In 2011, the restaurant donated food to Occupy Portland demonstrators.

The restaurant has also taken political stances. In 2013, it joined a handful of other restaurants in supporting City Commissioner Amanda Fritz's plan to require all local businesses to provide paid sick leave to employees. Steelman shared with The Portland Mercury that his employees accrue three paid days off per year and said, "I think that employee benefits give employees more confidence and self-worth, which creates a stronger community at work." In 2014, Por Que No supported the unsuccessful campaign behind Oregon Ballot Measure 88, which sought to make available four-year driver's cards to people who were unable to supply documentation of legal status.

== Reception ==
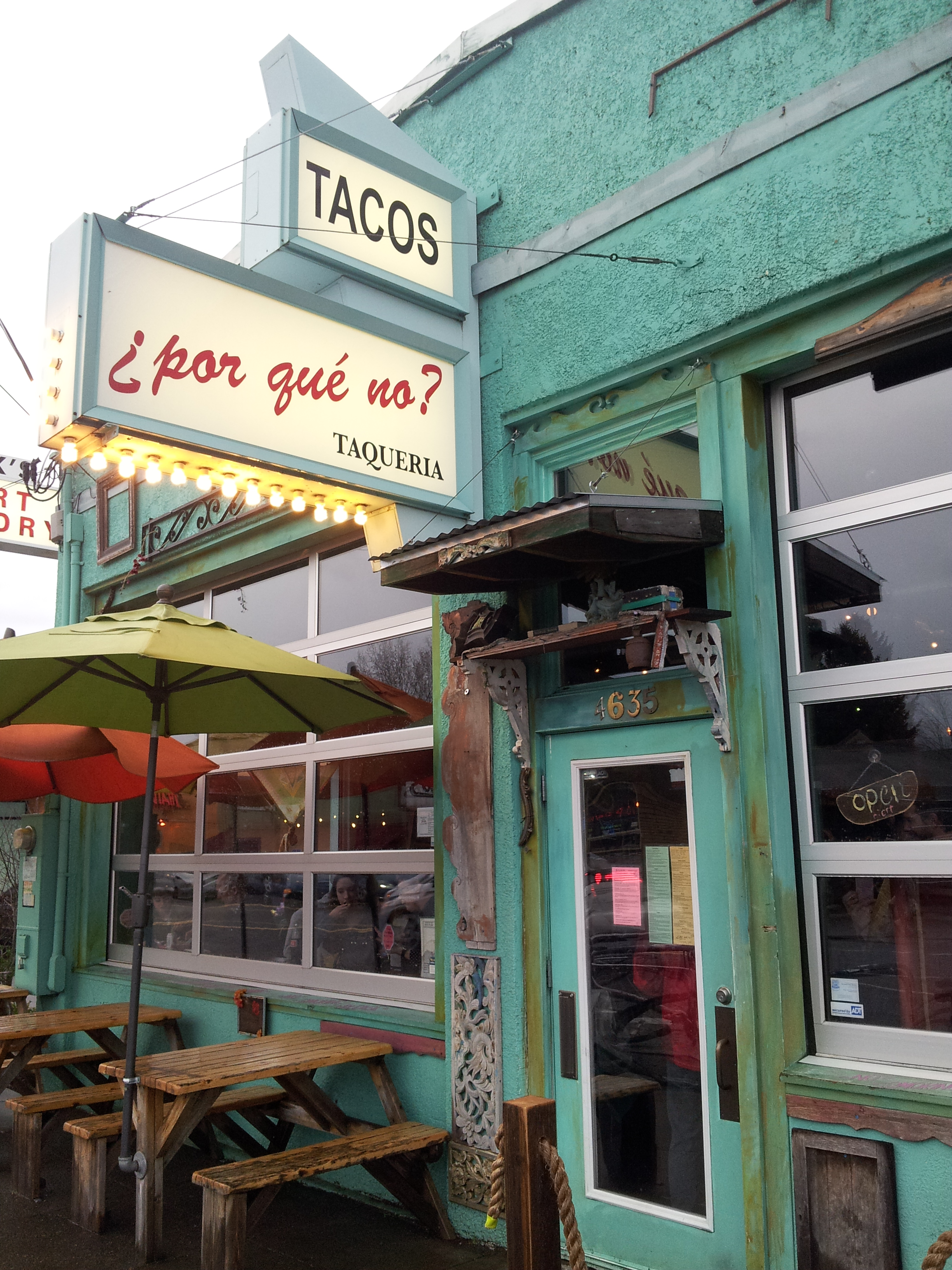
Hawthorne restaurant exterior, 2015

In 2005, Willamette Week's Seth Lorinczi disagreed with locals who criticized the original restaurant's high prices, saying, "you get what you pay for, and ¿Por Qué No? delivers the goods and then some. And in a neighborhood not known for its Mexican food, it fills a niche." Furthermore, he said the "folksy knickknacks and distressed tables fulfill the decorative requirements without veering into pastiche, and the effect is charming". Lorinczi complimented chef Mark Saldaña, whose "treatments border on the reverential... The effect is akin to watching high-definition television: One recognizes familiar flavors and textures, but they're startlingly detailed and fully realized." He ended his review by saying the restaurant's "upscale street food isn't for everyone... But I do know great cooking when I taste it, and ¿Por Que No?'s got it in spades."

The restaurant has been included in several Willamette Week lists. It was runner-up in the Best Mexican Restaurant category in the annual readers' poll in 2007. It won in the same category as well as the Best Taco category in 2022. Por Que No won in both categories in 2024. It has also been included in the newspaper's "Eat Cheap" (2008), "Restaurant Guide" (2013), and "Cheap Eats" (2014) lists.

Fox News Channel included Por Que No at number seven in its 2014 list of the ten best taco stands of the United States. One Frommer's reviewer recommend the lime margaritas and said of the Hawthorne location: "It's not huge, and you'll find lines for lunch more often than not, but in good weather it's the perfect spot for sunny sidewalk dining." The same reviewer described the taqueria in USA Today as "colorful" and said it "excels in atmosphere and food". In 2014, The Oregonian readers voted Por Que No as the Portland metropolitan area's best taqueria "in a landslide". The restaurant has also been called "hip", "merrily chaotic", "perpetually hectic", and a "Technicolor shrine" to the restaurants Steelman visited in Mexico.

== See also ==
- Hispanics and Latinos in Portland, Oregon
- List of restaurant chains in the United States
- Mexican street food
