= Cafe Azul =

Defunct Mexican restaurant in Portland, Oregon, US

- Interactive map of Cafe Azul

Restaurant information
- Established: 1994
- Closed: 2004
- Owners: Claire and Shawna Archibald
- Food type: Mexican
- Location: 112 Northwest 9th Avenue, Portland, Oregon, 97209, United States
- Coordinates: 45°31′26.6″N 122°40′48″W

Cafe Azul was a Mexican restaurant in Portland, Oregon's Pearl District, in the United States.

== History ==
Sisters Claire and Shawna Archibald opened the restaurant in McMinnville, Oregon, in 1994. The business was relocated to northwest Portland's Pearl District in 1998. The restaurant closed in 2004.

== Reception ==
Gourmet named Cafe Azul one of the 50 best restaurants in the United States. Claire Archibald earned a James Beard nomination in 2003 for her work. Danielle Centoni included Cafe Azul in Eater Portland's 2014 list of the city's "most missed" restaurants, writing, "Chef Claire Archibald's Mexican spot Cafe Azul is now looked upon as 'ahead of its time' for its upscale-authentic approach to Oaxacan cooking, and many readers are still nostalgic."

== See also ==
- Hispanics and Latinos in Portland, Oregon
- List of Mexican restaurants
