= Hispanics and Latinos in Portland, Oregon =

Ethnic and cultural demographic in Portland, Oregon

There were approximately 60,000 people of Hispanic or Latino origin in Portland, Oregon, as of 2020; about 10 percent of the city's population.

== Demographics ==
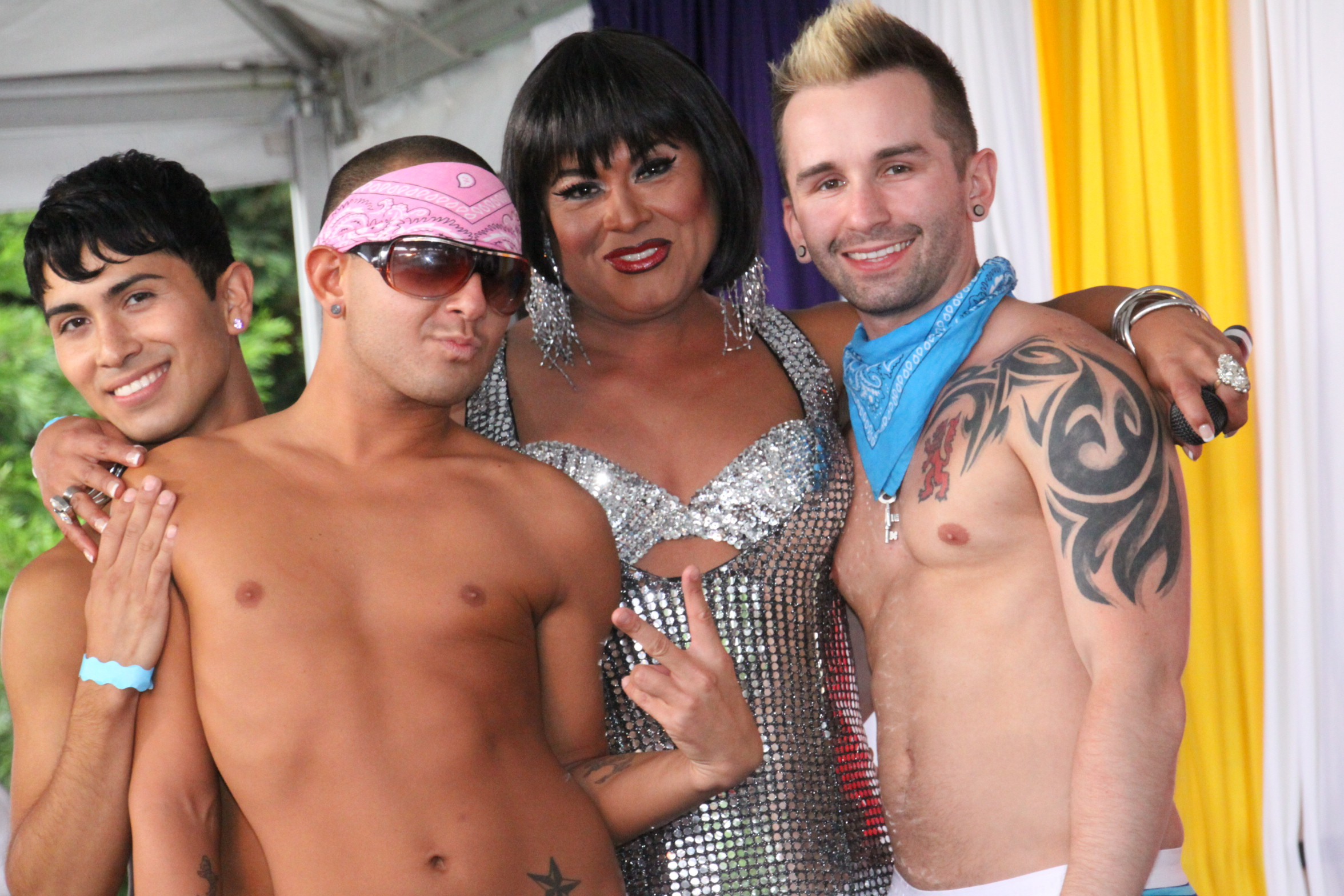
Latino Gay Pride, Portland, Oregon, 2011

The Portland metropolitan area has Oregon's largest Latino population. In 2022, Jamie Goldberg of The Oregonian wrote, "More than half of Oregon's Latino population lives in Multnomah, Washington and Marion counties. All three saw their Latino populations grow by at least 25% in the last decade. Washington County has the largest Latino population, 107,000 ... In Clackamas County, the Latino population grew by 38.5% in the last decade to more than 40,000 residents."

In 2024, Eater Portland said, "A self-reported study on Statistical Atlas showed just over 1,100 Salvadorans living in Portland, which makes up less than 1 percent of the Hispanic population of the city."

Ancestry by origin	Number
(Mexico) Mexican	39,181
(Puerto Rico) Puerto Rican	1,729
(Cuba) Cuban	2,172
(Dominican Republic) Dominican	138
(Costa Rica) Costa Rican	144
(Guatemala) Guatemalan	1,894
(Honduras) Honduran	423
(Nicaragua) Nicaraguan	284
(Panama) Panamanian	137
(El Salvador) Salvadoran	1,027
(Argentina) Argentine	381
(Bolivia) Bolivian	83
(Chile) Chilean	307
(Colombia) Colombian	446
(Ecuador) Ecuadorian	215
(Paraguay) Paraguayan	20
(Peru) Peruvian	537
(Uruguay) Uruguayan	33
(Venezuela) Venezuelan	161

== Culture ==
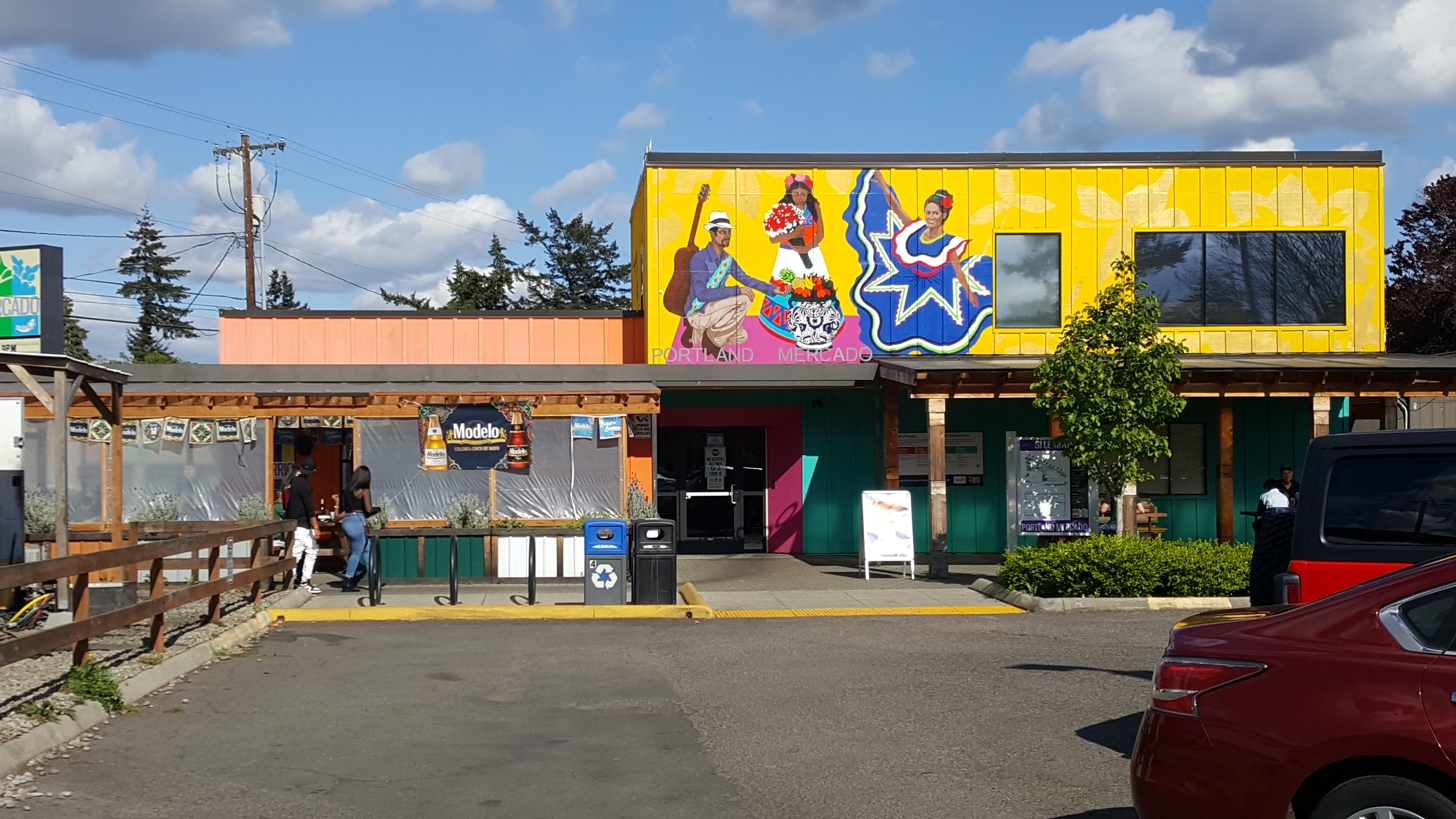
Portland Mercado focuses on Latin American cuisine

Parts of 39th Avenue were named Cesar Chavez Boulevard in honor of Latino labor activist Cesar Chavez.

Milagro is the only Hispanic theater production company in the Pacific Northwest. Deportivo Rose City is a soccer club.

=== Events ===
Annual events include the Portland Cinco de Mayo Fiesta, Day of the Dead celebrations, El Grito Portland, and the Latin American Film Festival. Makers de Mayo "showcases and celebrates Latin American culture through art, makers, music, food and more", according to KPTV's Ayo Elise. PDX Latinx Pride (formerly Portland Latino Gay Pride) hosts the Latinx Pride Festival.

=== Cuisine ===
The Portland Mercado is a collection of food carts in southeast Portland, focused on Latin American cuisine. Notable restaurants and bars known for serving Latin American and Spanish (or Catalan) food in the city include:

- Andina
- Astral
- Bar Cala (2022)
- Birrieria La Plaza
- Birrieria PDX (2020)
- Casa Zoraya
- Cha Cha Cha (2001)
- El Cubo de Cuba
- El Nutri Taco
- Gol
- Güero (2017)
- Ki'ikibáa (2022)
- La Bonita
- Lechon
- Los Gorditos (2006)
- Matt's BBQ Tacos
- Mestizo
- Mis Tacones (2016)
- Mole Mole
- Nuestra Cocina (2004)
- Ox (2012)
- Palomar (2018)
- Pambiche Cocina and Repostería Cubana
- Papi Chulo's (2019)
- Por Que No (2004)
- República
- Salsas Locas
- Smart Donkey
- Tamale Boy
- Taqueria Los Puñales (2020)
- Tight Tacos (2016)
- Tito's Taquitos
- Tope

Notable defunct restaurants include:

- 180 Xurros
- Ataula (2013–2021)
- Autentica
- Cafe Azul
- Chelo
- De Noche (2022–2025)
- El Gallo Taqueria (2009–2022)
- Esparza's (1990–2014)
- The Goose (2014)
- La Calaca Comelona
- La Carreta Mexican Restaurant (1990–2020s)
- Masia (2020–2021)
- Mi Mero Mole (2011–2020)
- Original Taco House (1960–2017)
- Ración
- Reeva (2022–2025)
- Robo Taco
- Santa Fe Taqueria (1990–2024)
- Sissy Bar (2022–2024)
- Teote (2013)
- Toro Bravo (2007–2020)
- Xico (2012–2023)
