= Los Gorditos =

Chain of Mexican restaurants in Portland, Oregon, U.S.

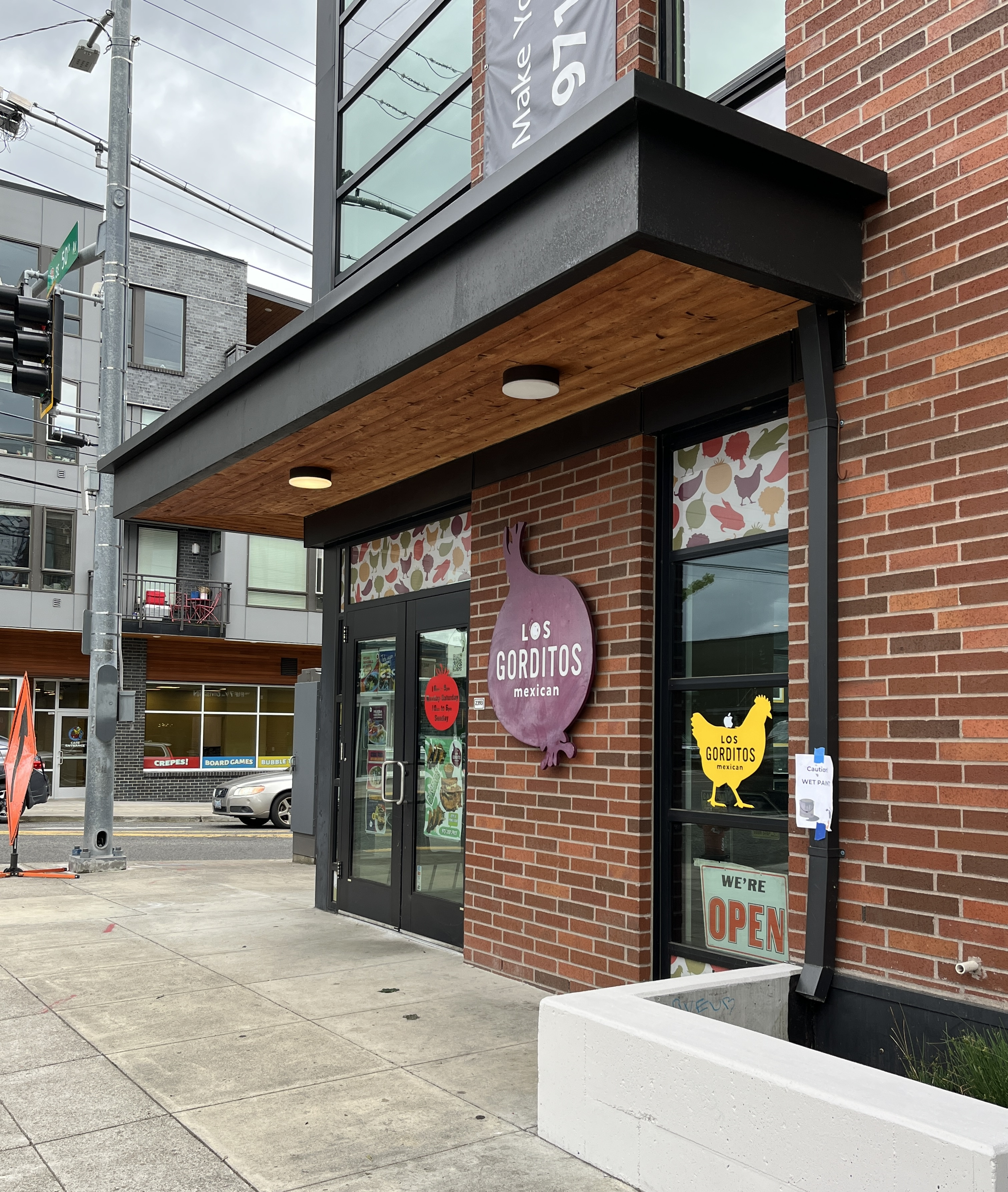
- Exterior of a location in southeast Portland, Oregon, 2025

Restaurant information
- Established: 2006
- Previous owner: Alicia Cruz
- Food type: Mexican
- Location: Portland, Multnomah, Oregon, United States
- Website: losgorditospdx.com

Los Gorditos (also known as Taqueria Los Gorditos) is a small chain of Mexican restaurants in Portland, Oregon, United States. Established in 2006, the business has operated as many as six locations, as food trucks and brick and mortar shops. The vegan- and vegetarian-friendly menu includes burritos, fajitas, quesadillas, and tacos, with fillings such as pinto beans, soy curls, soy chorizo, and tofu. The business has garnered a positive reception.

== Description ==
The small chain of Mexican restaurants Los Gorditos operates in Portland, Oregon. The menu has burritos (including a chile relleno variety), fajitas, quesadillas, and tacos. Los Gortidos also has vegan and vegetarian options; among vegan taco fillings are fajita vegetables, refried pinto beans, grilled soy curls, soy chorizo, and tofu. The Garbage Burrito has chicken, beef, and pork, as well as beans, rice, cheese, cilantro, onion, salsas, and sour cream.

== History and locations ==
Los Gorditos was established in 2006. The original food truck operated at the intersection of 50th and Division Street, in southeast Portland. In 2017, owner Alicia Cruz announced plans to open a brick and mortar shop (the chain's sixth overall) at a development on the same site. As of 2017, Los Gorditos operated a food truck at 50th and Powell Boulevard, in southeast Portland.

Los Gorditos has a shop at 83rd and Powell. The business also operates at the intersection of 9th and Davis, in northwest Portland's Pearl District, in the space previously occupied by Sweet Masterpieces.

== Reception ==
In 2009, Patrick Alan Coleman said of the taco truck at 50th and Division: "I love eating next to Gorditos' large psychedelic mural. It makes me feel like I'm in a 1960s acid-western flick starring Peter Fonda." Michael Russell of The Oregonian called the quesatacos, which he described as "gooey little quesadillas topped with meat and rolled into a taco", "irresistible" in 2011. He said: "Best eaten with Gorditos' garlicky, neon orange hot sauce, they're just about the greatest invention since grilled cheese and sliced bread." The Daily Hive included Los Gorditos in 2021 lists of the seven best eateries in the Portland metropolitan area for both burritos and tacos.

== See also ==
- Hispanics and Latinos in Portland, Oregon
- List of Mexican restaurants
- List of restaurant chains in the United States
