= Birrieria PDX =

Mexican restaurant in Portland, Oregon, U.S.

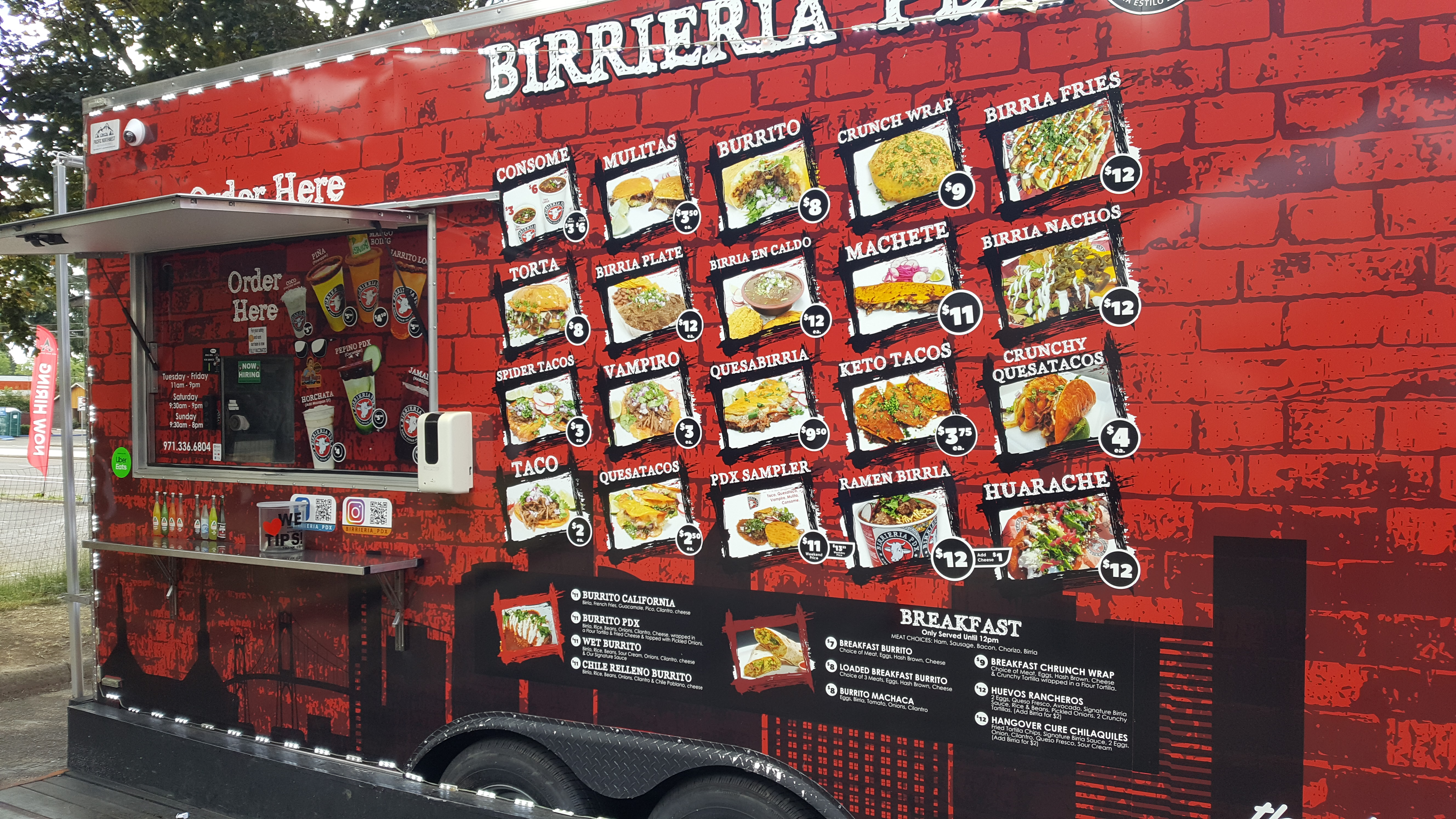
- The food cart in southeast Portland, Oregon, 2022
- Interactive map of Birrieria PDX

Restaurant information
- Owners: Lorena Brambila; Daniel Miranda; Grecya Miranda; Ivan Uc
- Food type: Mexican
- Location: Portland, Oregon, United States
- Coordinates: 45.5041°N 122.4923°W

Birrieria PDX is a Mexican restaurant in Portland, Oregon, United States.

== Description ==
The original Birrieria PDX operates from a red food cart on Division Street in southeast Portland's Centennial neighborhood, serving Mexican cuisine such as birria (including birria tacos and "birriamen", or ramen with birria), quesabirria, rice, beans, shredded meat, horchata, and agua frescas. The Plaza Plate includes a quesadilla, taco, mulita, tostada, and cup of consommé.

== History ==
The family-owned restaurant opened in August 2020. Spouses Daniel Miranda and Lorena Brambila are co-owners with his sister Grecya Miranda her husband Ivan Uc. Since then, the business has expanded; there are four food carts in Portland, as of 2022.

== Reception ==
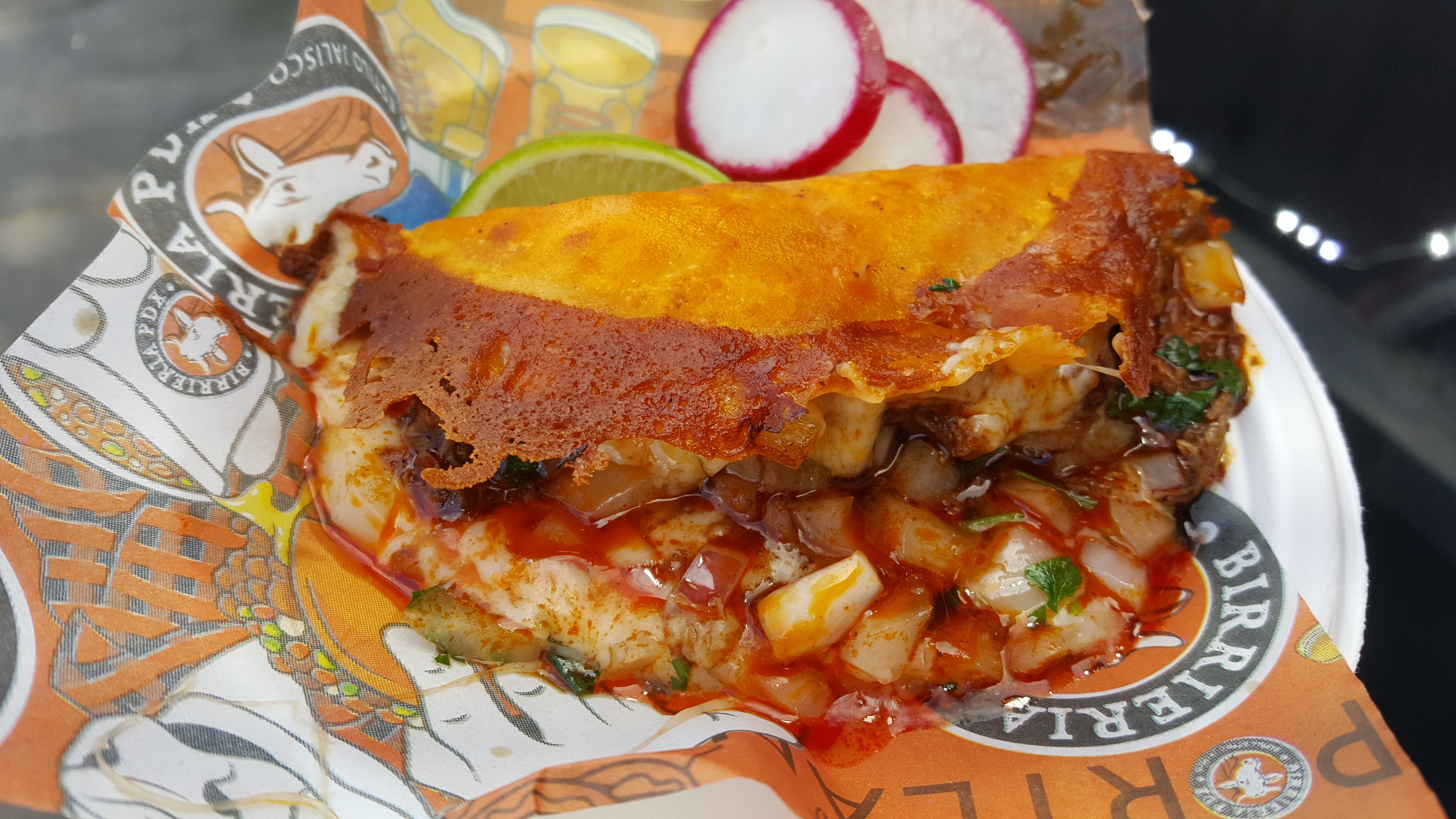
Quesataco, 2022

In 2021, Zoe Baillargeon included the Birria Crunch Wrap in Eater Portland's overview of "Where to Find the Cheesiest Dishes in Portland and Beyond", writing:

Another fantastic birria cart, Birrieria's menu is a touch more extensive than others, with things like ramen, birria fries, and 'keto tacos' — birria in a crispy cheese 'tortilla.' But those looking for a true cheese overload should go for the cart's crunch wrap: A UFO-shaped tortilla parcel filled with tender beef, plenty of cheese, two tostadas for crunch, rice and beans, and, for an added cheesy element, Hot Cheetos. Then again, those intimidated by a dish quite this hypebeast can stick to the cart's exceptional quesabirria.

Additionally, the website's Alex Frane described the crunch wrap as "sheer indulgence". He and Ron Scott included the Birria en Caldo in a 2021 list of "Portland's Most Potent Hangover Cures". The restaurant ranked second in the Best Taco category of Willamette Week's annual 'Best of Portland' readers' poll in 2022.

Eater Portland's Brooke Jackson-Glidden included the Birria en Caldo in a 2022 list of "17 Sick Day Delivery Standbys to Order in Portland". She wrote, "when feeling under the weather, it's best to stay simple: the birria en caldo is just a tub of the braised beef in its rich broth, with a side of rice and tortillas. Those looking for some sinus-clearing can add a side of the hot salsa, to pour over rice or directly in the soup (not that it needs it)." The website's Katrina Yentch and other staffers also included Birrieria PDX in a list of "22 Go-to Spots for Affordable Dining in Portland".

== See also ==
- Hispanics and Latinos in Portland, Oregon
- List of Mexican restaurants
- List of restaurant chains in the United States
