= Salsas Locas =

Mexican restaurant in Portland, Oregon, U.S.

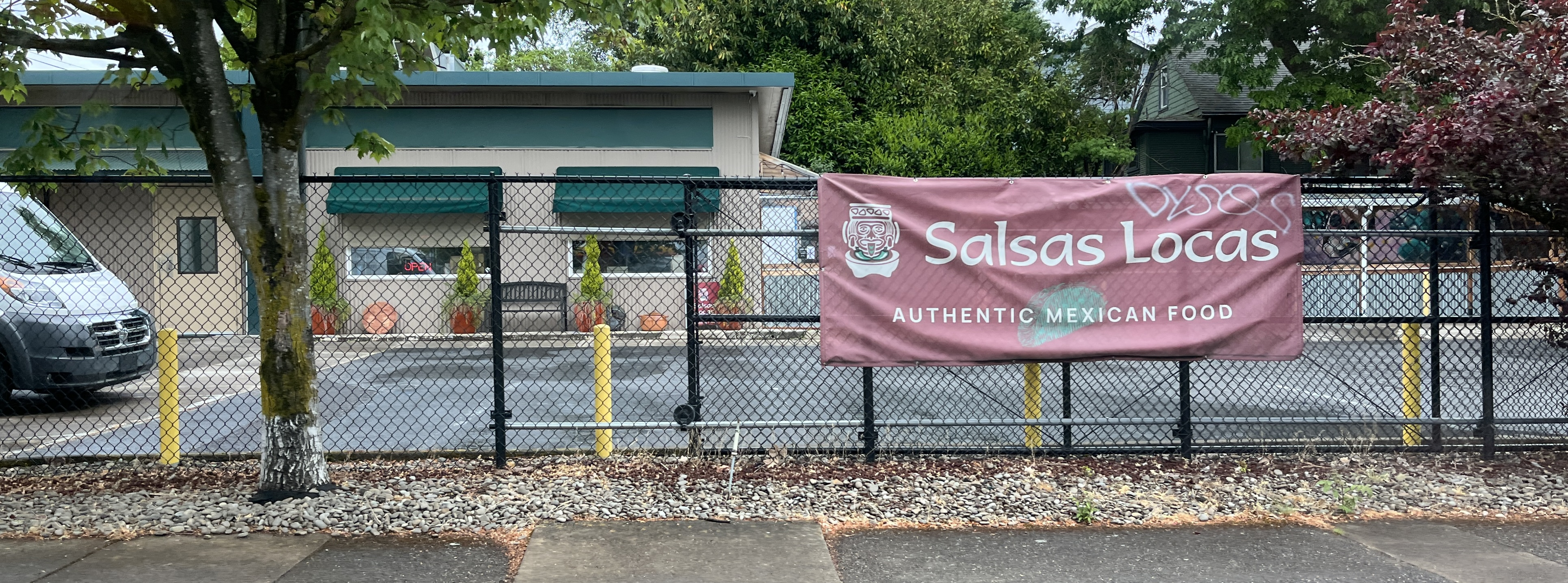
- The restaurant's exterior and signage, 2025
- Interactive map of Salsas Locas

Restaurant information
- Food type: Mexican
- Location: 4512 Southeast 28th Avenue, Portland, Multnomah, Oregon, 97202, United States
- Coordinates: 45.4900°N 122.6373°W
- Website: salsaslocas.com

Salsas Locas, formerly Tortilleria y Tienda DeLeon or Tortilleria y Tienda DeLeon's, is a Mexican restaurant in Portland, Oregon, United States.

== Description ==
The family-owned and operated Mexican restaurant Salsas Locas operates in southeast Portland's Reed neighborhood, near Reed College. Previously, the business was a deli counter, grocery, and tortilla factory known as Tortilleria y Tienda de Leon's and operated at 162nd Avenue and Glisan Street at the border between Portland and Gresham.

=== Salsas Locas ===
Salsas Locas has covered and heated outdoor seating. The guisados-focused menu includes burritos, cochinita pibil, tacos, and tamales. Guisado varieties include beef in a "chile Colorado–style" red sauce, birria, bistec con nopales, chicken tinga, and pork in salsa verde. The stews are used in dishes like burritos and tacos. The restaurant also serves carnitas tacos. There are green, orange habanero, and red varieties of salsas. Ingredients used in vegetarian options include cactus and zucchini.

=== Tortilleria y Tienda de Leon ===
The mercado and taqueria Tortilleria y Tienda de Leon's had aisles of groceries and piñatas. There was produce, a bakery, and a meat counter. The business also served beef tongue and made tortillas. Eater Portland called the business vegan-friendly.

== History ==
Tortilleria y Tienda De Leon's was established in 1973. The business moved to its current location in 2022.

Salsas Locas's salsas have been sold at New Seasons Market. Hillsboro School District has served whole-grain tamales supplied by Salsas Locas.

== Reception ==
Nick Zukin included Tortilleria y Tienda de Leon in Willamette Week's 2016 overview of Portland's best chile relleno burritos.

== See also ==
- Hispanics and Latinos in Portland, Oregon
- List of Mexican restaurants
