= Poc chuc =

Mayan dish

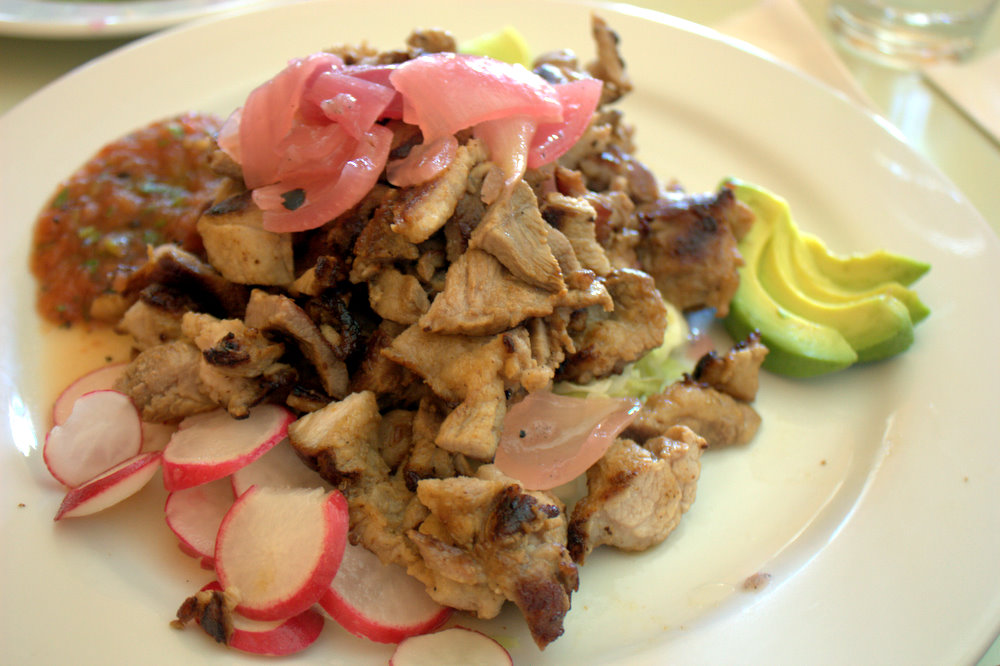
Poc chuc

Poc chuc is a Mayan dish of meat, commonly pork, that is prepared in citrus marinade and cooked over a grill. Poc chuc is often served with a side of rice, pickled onion, refried beans, and avocado. Poc chuc is one of the signature dishes of the Yucatán.

== Etymology ==
The term poc chuc is made up of two Mayan words: poc, which means to toast, especially on hot embers, and chuc, which is charcoal.
