= Moon Publications =

Travel guidebook publisher

- Parent company: Avalon Travel, a member of the Perseus Books Group
- Founded: 1973
- Headquarters location: Berkeley, California
- Publication types: Books
- Nonfiction topics: Travel Guides
- Official website: www.moon.com

Moon is a travel guidebook publisher founded in 1973 in Chico, California. The company started with travel guides to Asia and later also published guides to the Americas.

Bill Dalton was the founder and writer of the regularly updated Indonesian Handbook from the 1970s.

The company is now based in Berkeley, California and published by Avalon Travel, a member of the Perseus Books Group.
