= List of Mexican dishes =

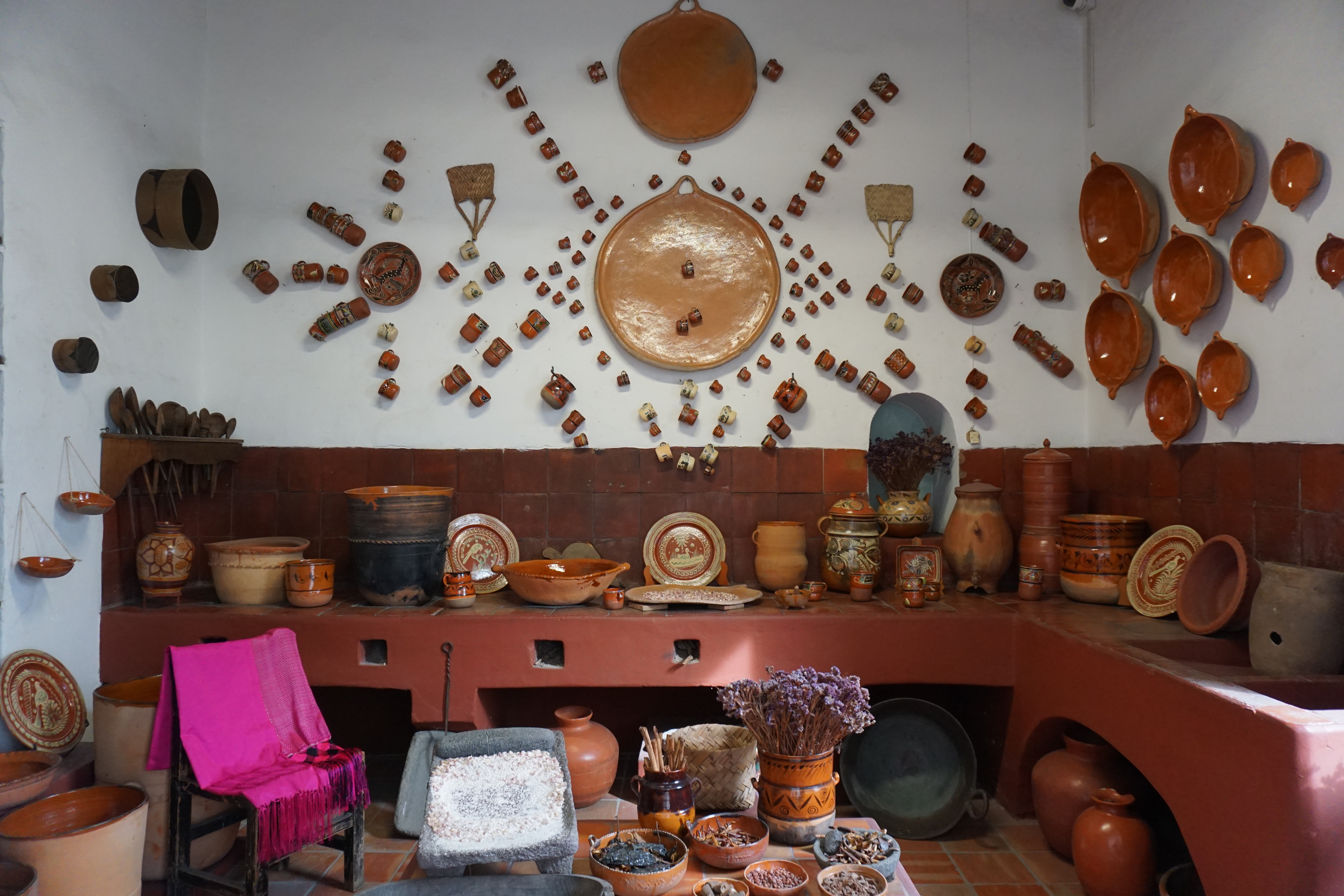
Representation of a Mexican kitchen; in front are Mexican food and spices, while in the background there are typical utensils.

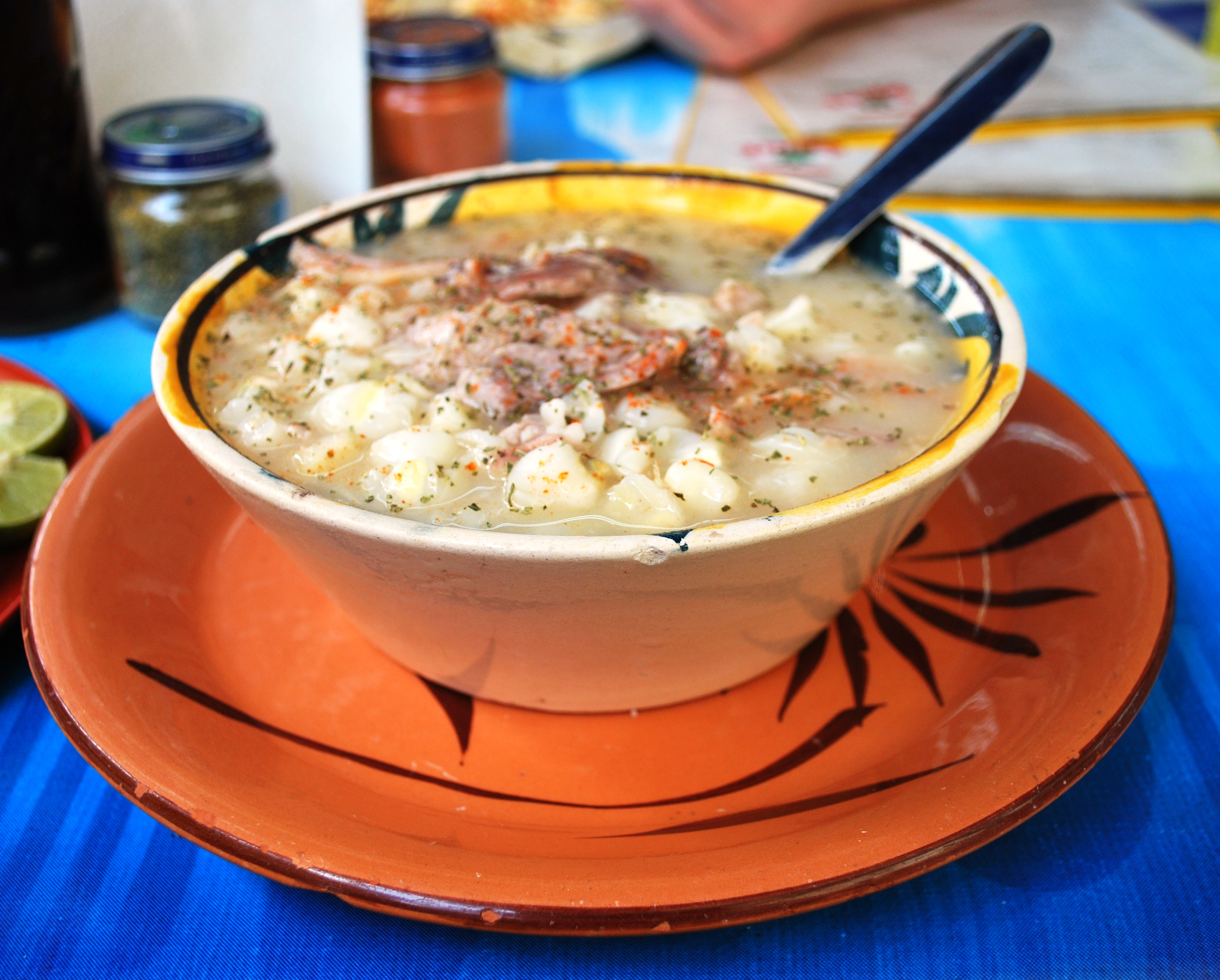
Pozole is a traditional soup or stew from Mexico.

The Spanish invasion of the Aztec Empire occurred in the 16th century. The basic staples since then remain native foods such as corn, beans, squash and chili peppers, but the Europeans introduced many other foods, the most important of which were meat from domesticated animals, dairy products (especially cheese) and various herbs and spices, although key spices in Mexican cuisine are also native to Mesoamerica such as a large variety of chili peppers.

== Antojitos ==
Street food in Mexico, called antojitos, is prepared by street vendors and at small traditional markets in Mexico. Most of them include corn as an ingredient.

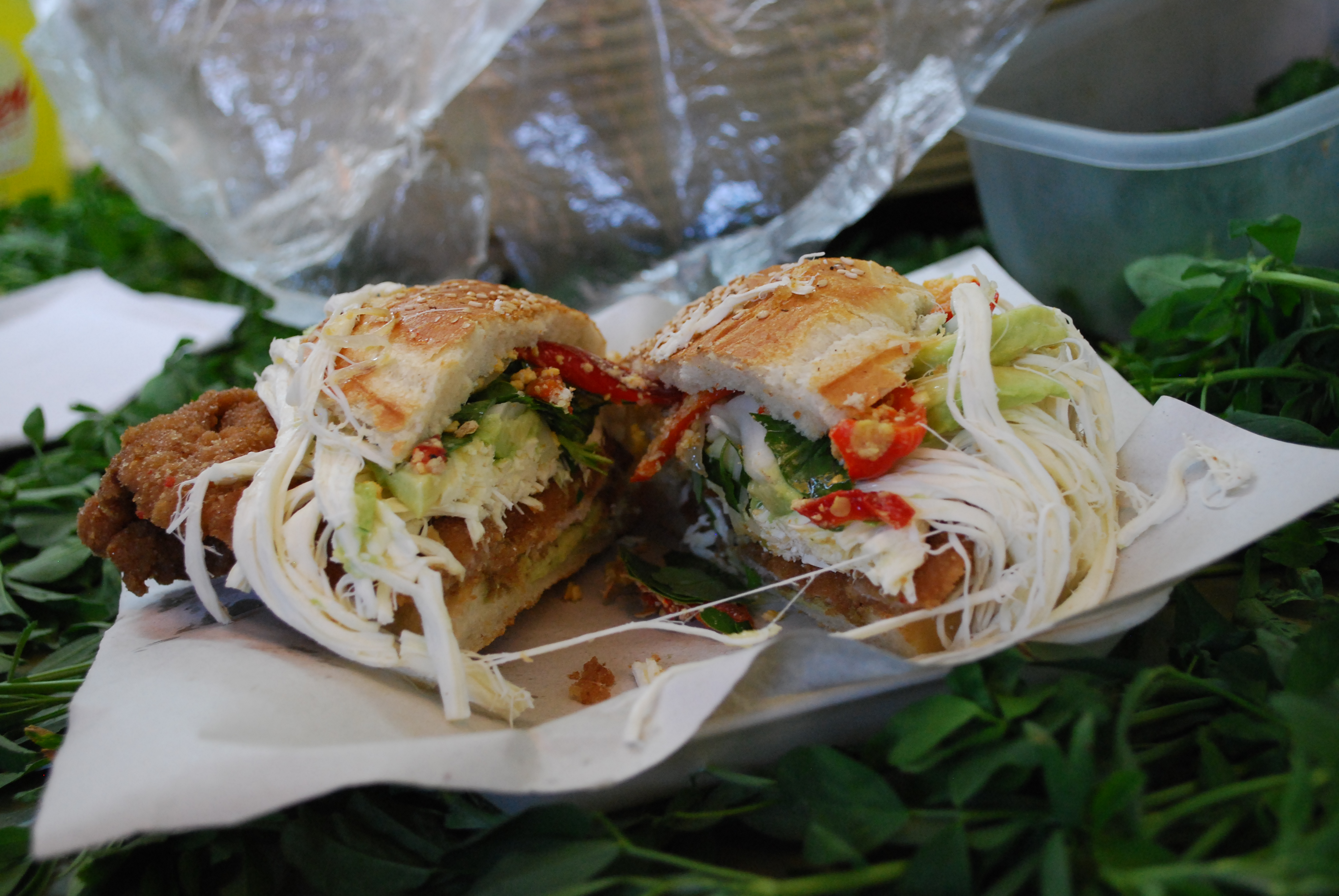
Cemita with milanesa

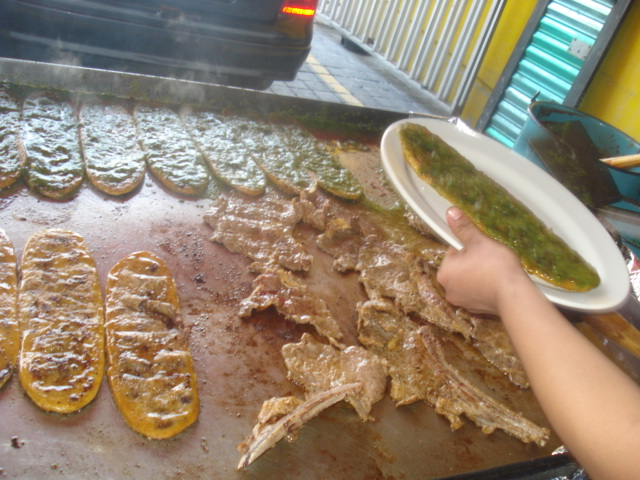
Preparation of huaraches

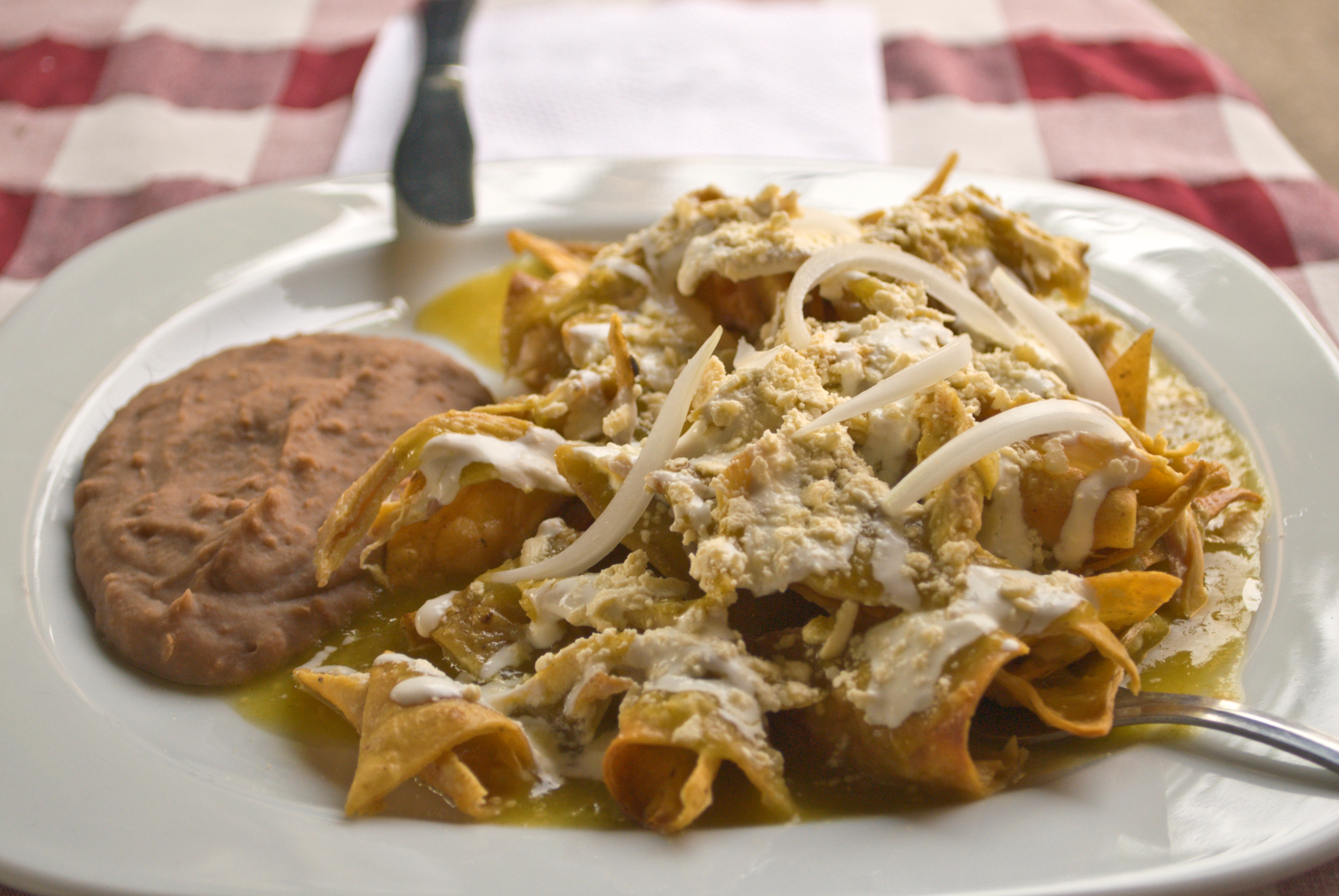
Chilaquiles

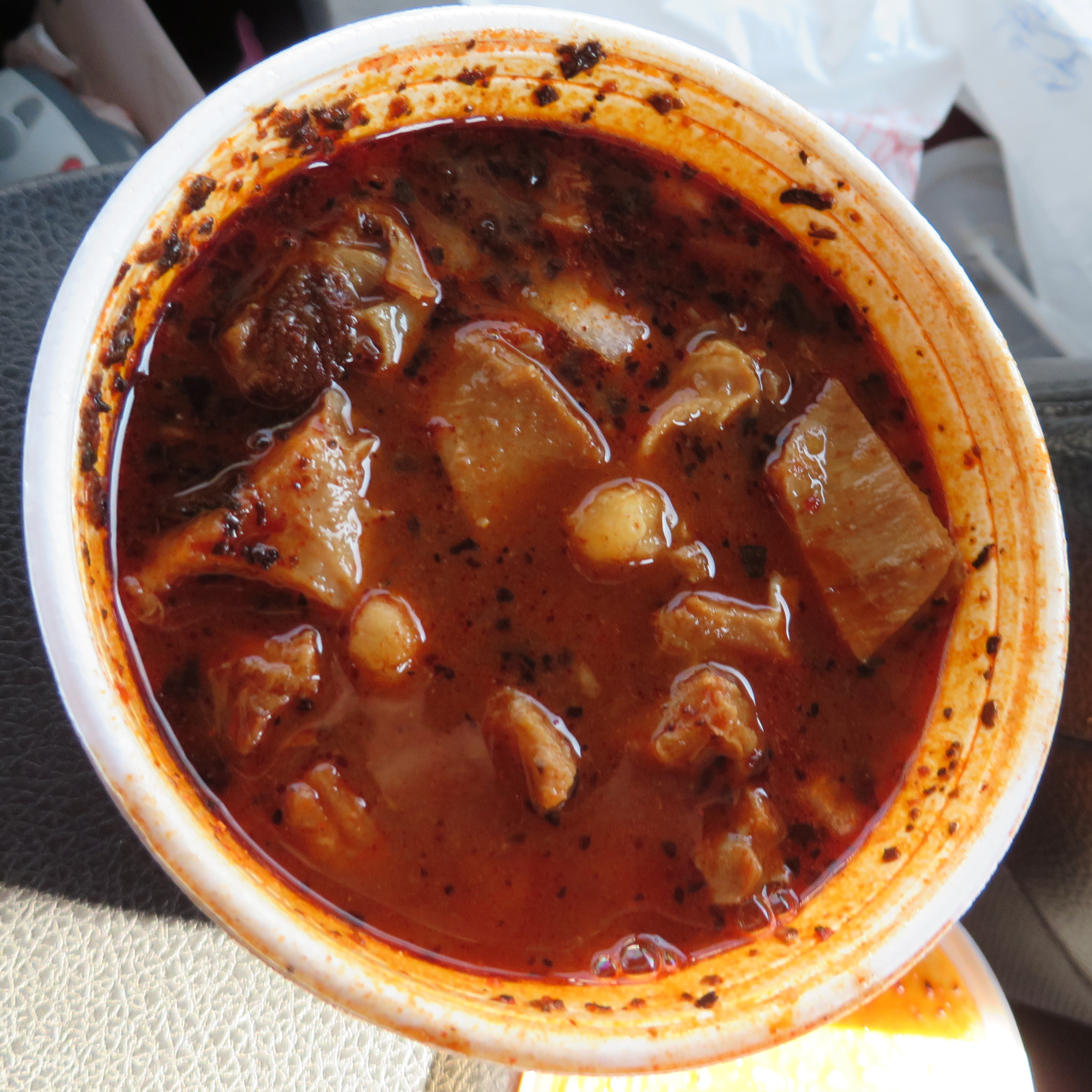
Menudo

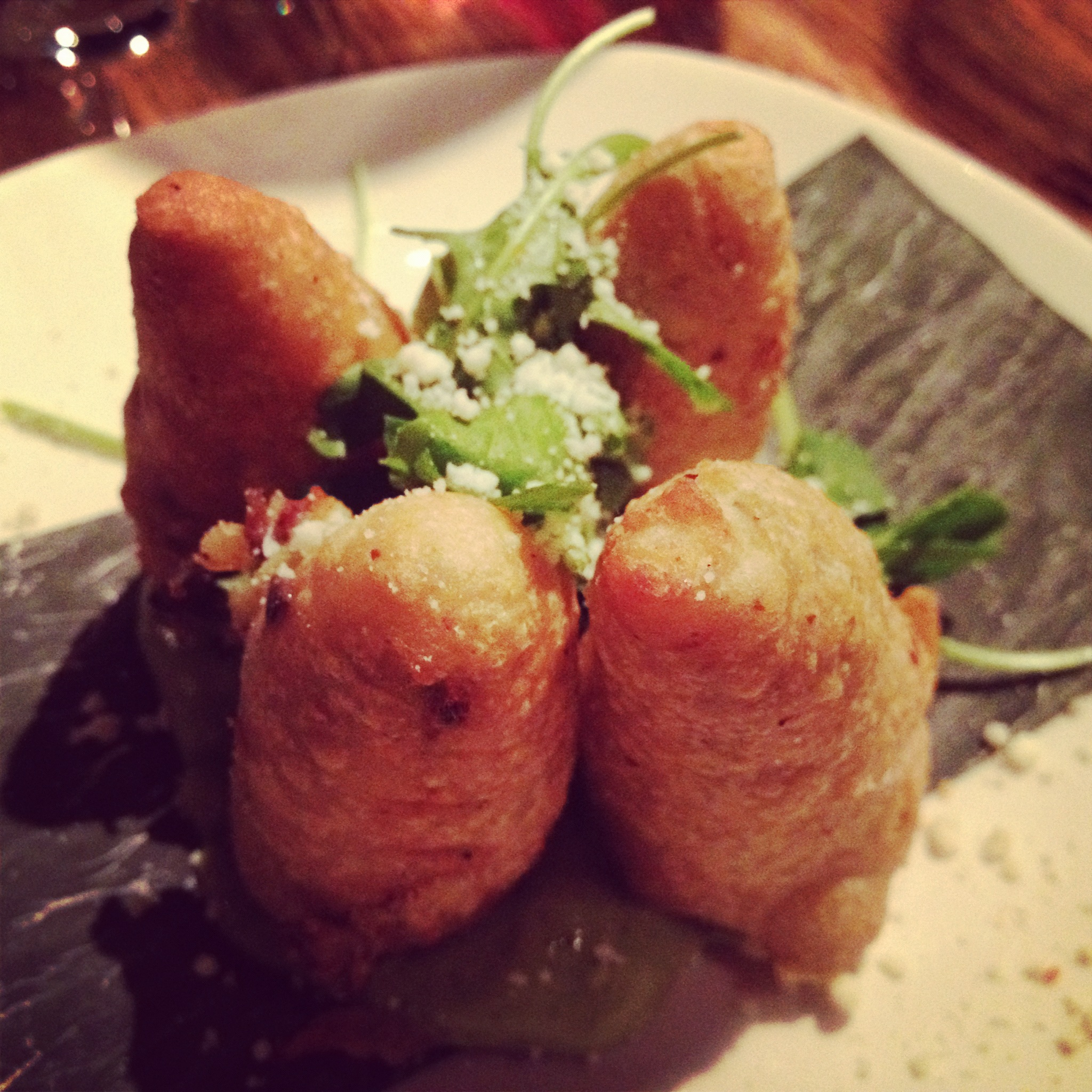
Molotes

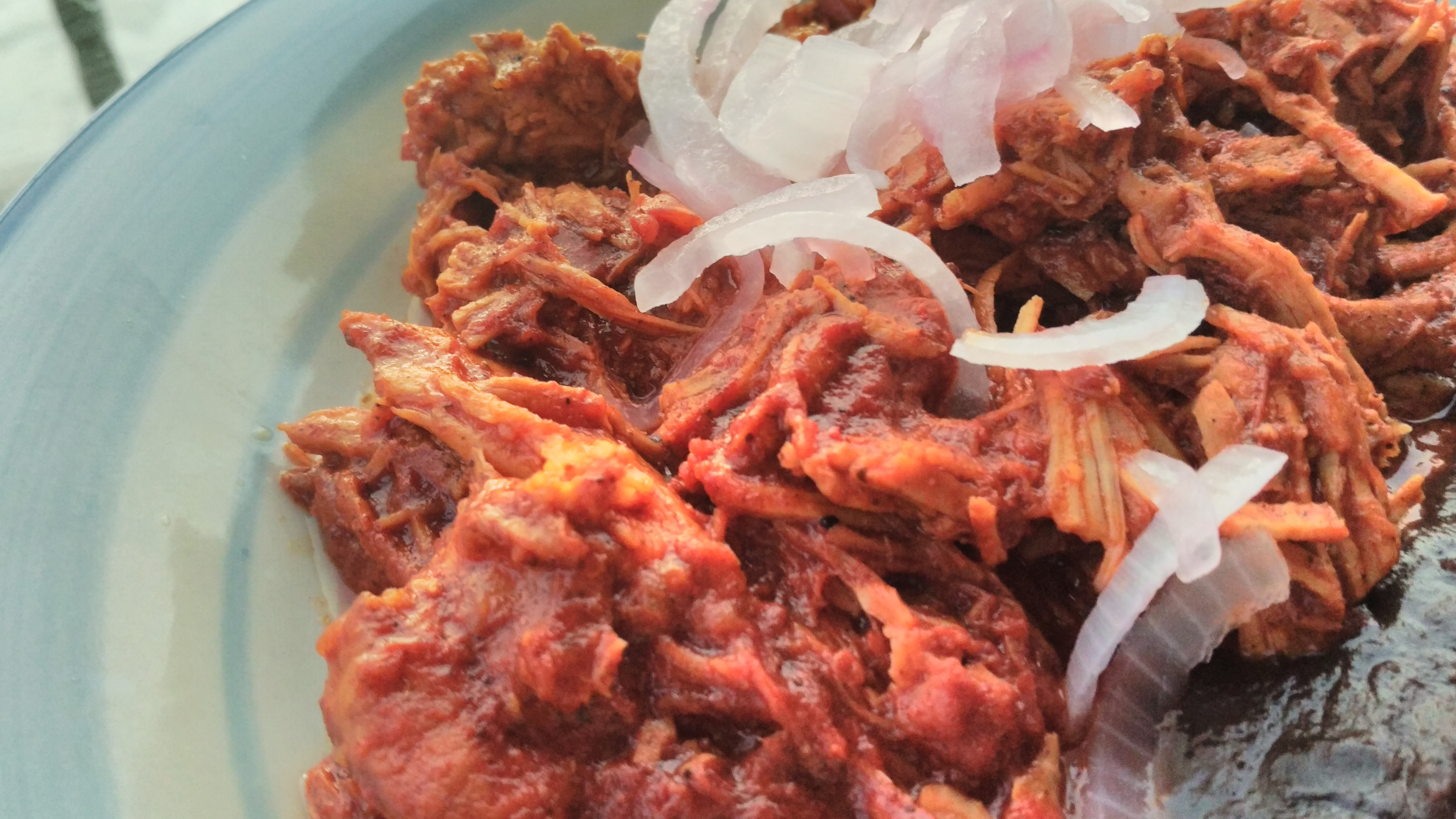
Cochinita pibil is a traditional Mexican slow-roasted pork dish from the Yucatán Peninsula of Mayan origin.

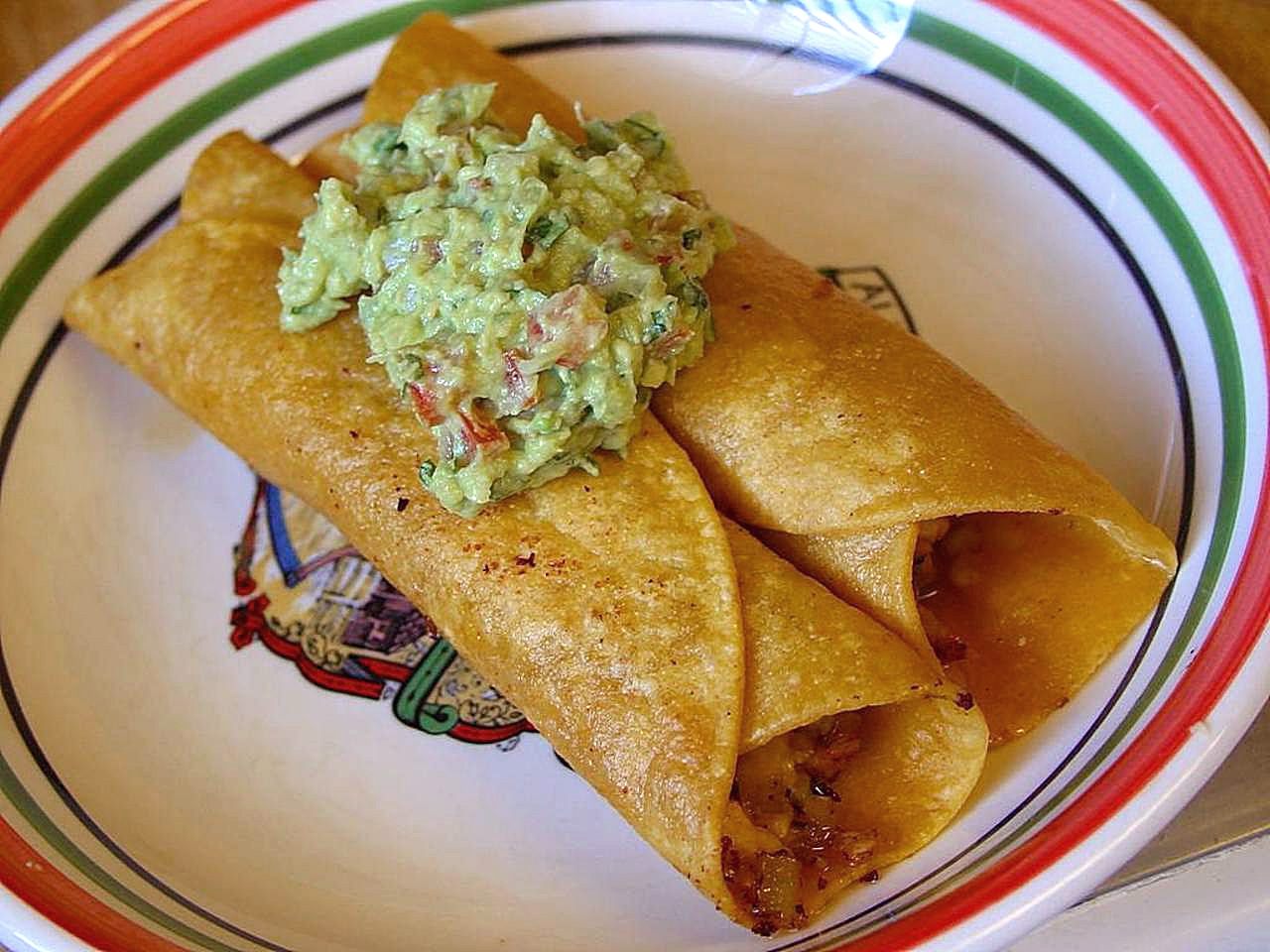
Flautas with guacamole

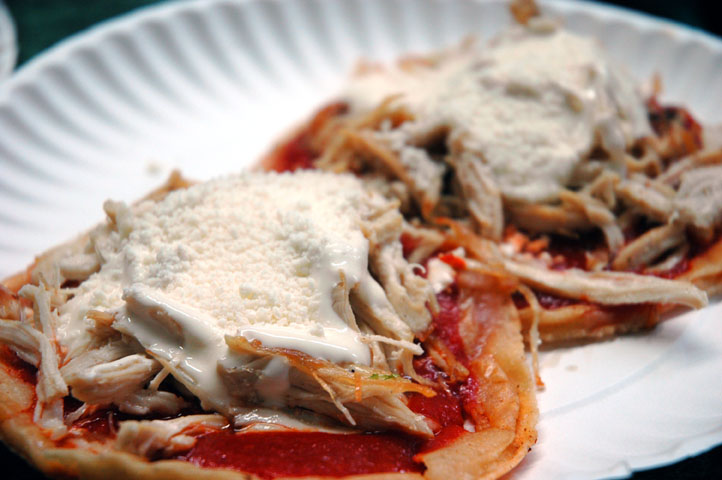
Sopes

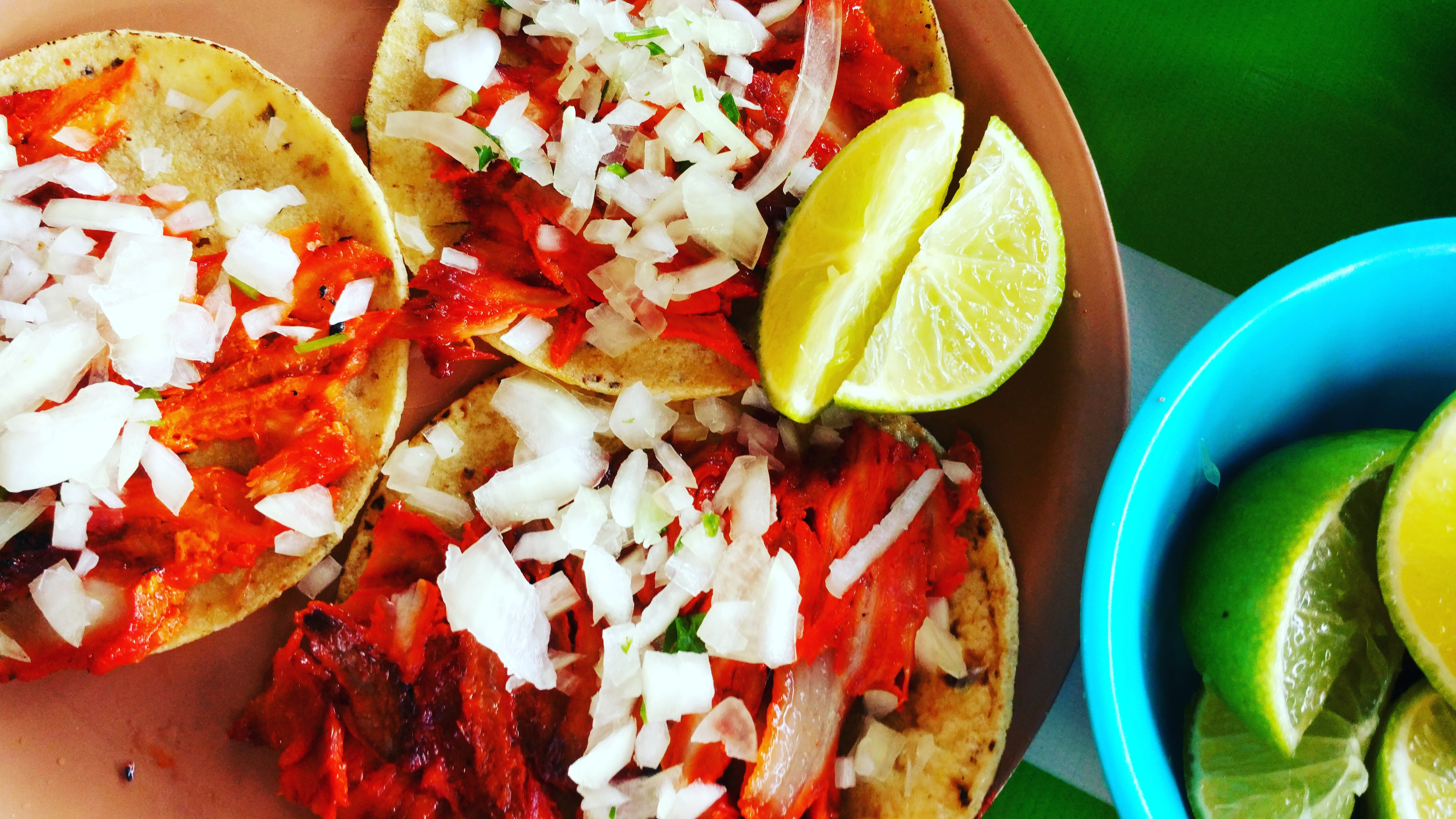
Tacos al pastor

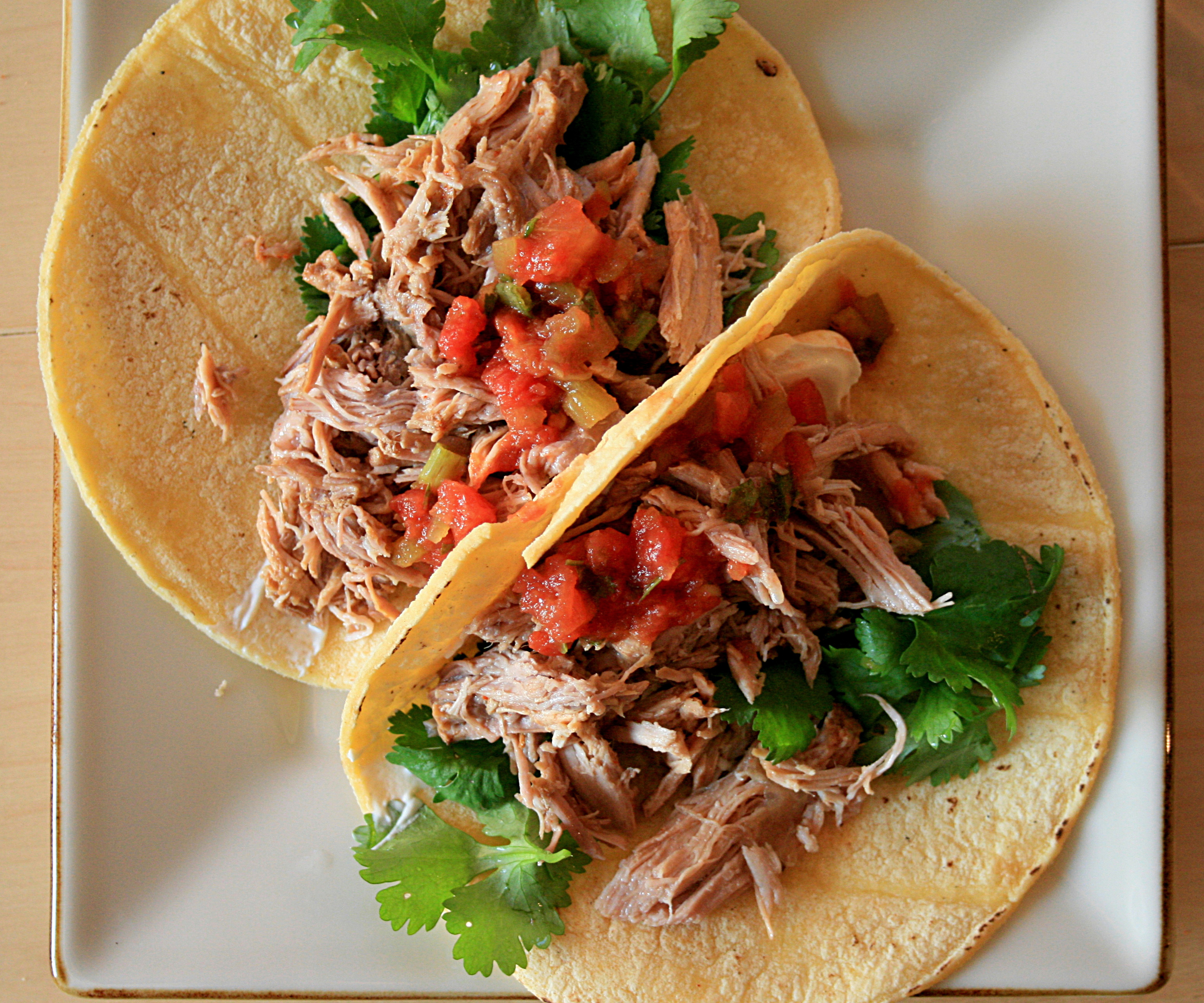
Tacos prepared with a carnitas filling
- Aguachile
- Avocado
- Bolillos
- Burrito
  - Burro percherón
- Camote (Mexican sweet potato)
- Chahuis
- Cemitas sandwiches
- Chalupa
- Chapulines
- Charales, small fish, basically a type of smelt
- Chicharrón
- Chilaquiles
- Chimichangas (Tex-Mex mostly)
- Choriqueso
- Chorizo
- Cochinita pibil
- Cocido
- Cóctel de camarón and other seafood cocktails
- Corunda
- Curtido
- Elote
- Empanadas
- Enchilada (red or green)
- Enfrijoladas
- Ensalada de fruta (fruit salad)
- Entomatadas
- Escamoles
- Fajitas
- Filete de pescado
- Flautas
- Frijoles charros
- Fritada
- Gorditas
- Gringas
- Huauzontles
- Huaraches
- Huitlacoche
- Japanese peanuts
- Jicama
- Jocoque
- Jumiles
- Lengua
- Lentil soup (lentil beans)
- Longaniza
- Machaca
- Maguey worm
- Mancha manteles
- Memela
- Menudo
- Mixiotes
- Mole de olla
- Mole poblano
- Molletes
- Molotes
- Moronga
- Nachos
- Pambazos
- Panucho
- Papadzules
- Parilladas
- Pastel azteca
- Pejelagarto
- Picadillo
- Quesadillas
- Queso
- Rajas con crema
- Romeritos
- Salbutes
- Salsa
- Sincronizadas
- Sopes
- Tacos
- Taco al pastor
- Tacos de sesos
- Tamales
- Taquitos
- Tlacoyos
- Tlayudas
- Tortas (sandwiches)
- Tortillas
- Tostadas
- Tostilocos
- Totopo
- Tripas
- Venado (venison), particularly in the Yucatan
- Yuca (cassava)

== Cheese dishes ==
- Caldo de queso
- Queso flameado

== Egg dishes ==
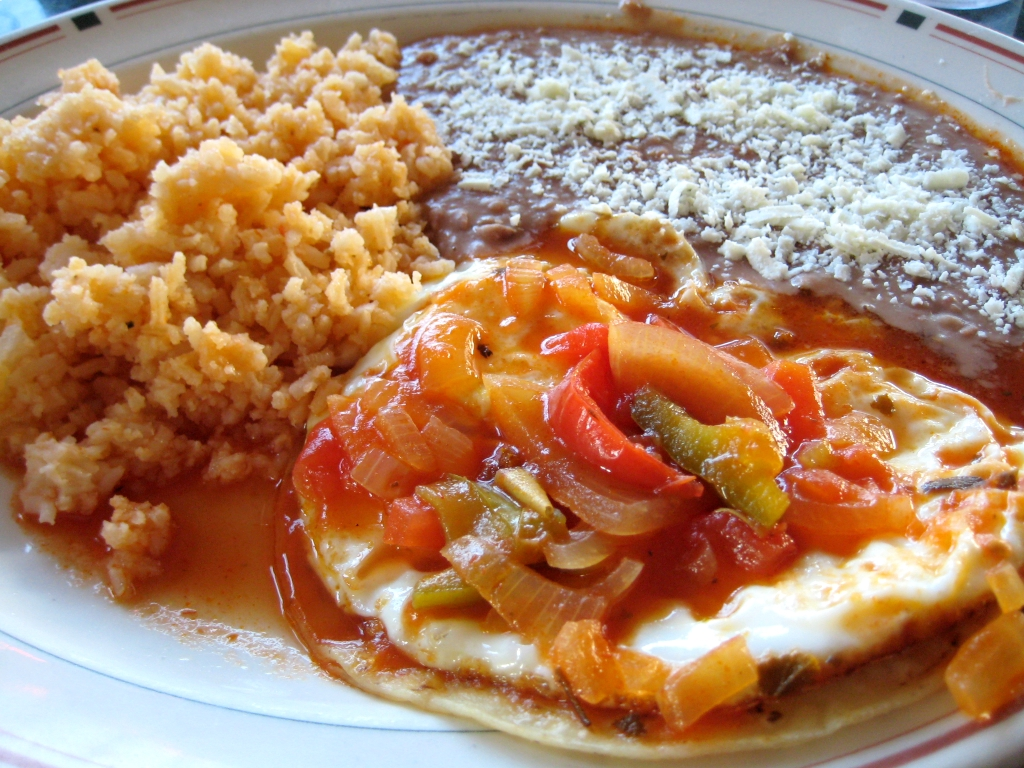
Huevos rancheros

- Huevos a la mexicana
- Huevos motuleños
- Huevos rancheros
- Migas

== Meat dishes ==
=== Beef dishes ===
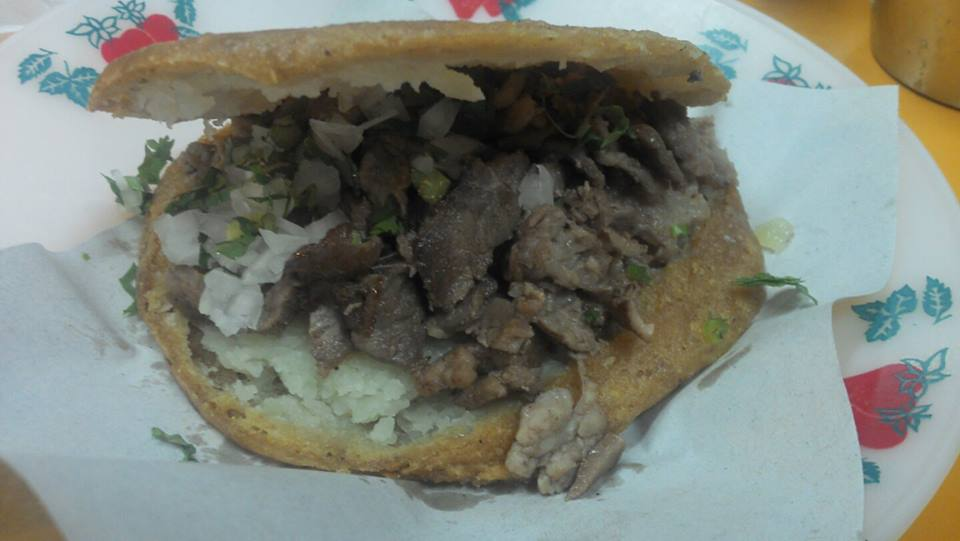
Bistec

- Albóndigas, Mexican meatballs
- Aporreadillo
- Beef brain
- Bistec
- Carne asada, grilled beef
- Carne a la tampiqueña, carne asada that is usually accompanied by a small portion of enchiladas (or chilaquiles), refried beans, fresh cheese, guacamole, and a vegetable (often rajas; grilled slices of Poblano peppers)
- Cecina – In Mexico, most cecina is of two kinds: sheets of marinated beef, and a pork cut that is pounded thin and coated with chili pepper (this type is called cecina enchilada or carne enchilada).
- Milanesas – Chicken, beef, and a pork breaded fried bisteces

=== Goat dishes ===
- Cabrito

=== Pork dishes ===
- Calabacitas con puerco
- Carnitas
- Chilorio
- Chorizo
- Cochinita pibil
- Hog maw (Buche)
- Pickled pigs' feet
- Poc Chuc

=== Poultry dishes ===
- Patitas
- Pollo asado
- Pollo al carbón
- Pollo motuleño

=== Other meat and protein dishes ===
- Barbacoa
- Birria – a spicy stew from the state of Jalisco traditionally made from goat meat or mutton
- Chapulines – toasted grasshoppers seasoned with salt & lime
- Conejo en Adobo – rabbit in red chile sauce
- Escamol – the edible larvae and pupae of ants
- Pastel azteca
- Puntas
- Queso de Puerco, head cheese prepared with vinegar, garlic, oregano and black pepper, among others. Wheels are often sold covered in paraffin wax. Non dairy.
- Discada
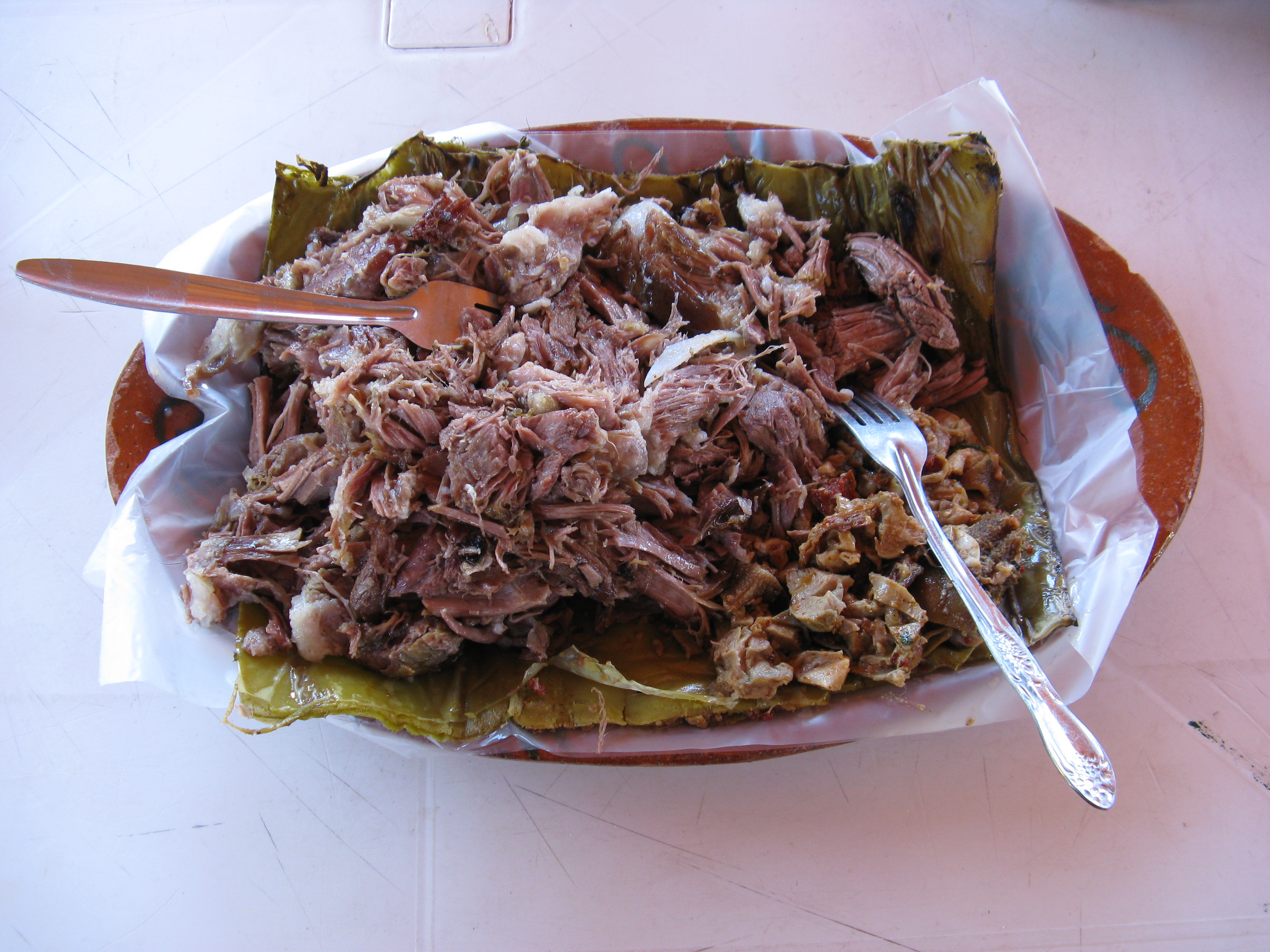
Barbacoa

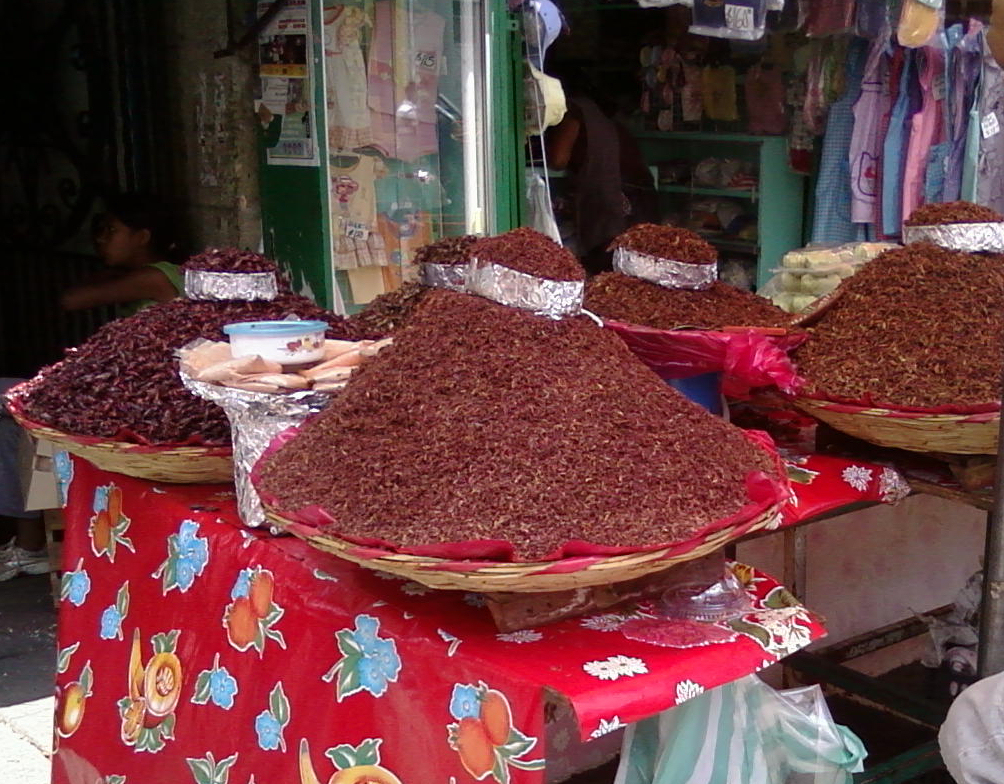
Chapulines – toasted grasshoppers

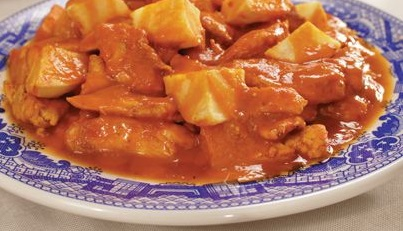
Puntas

== Moles, sauces, dips and spreads ==
- Chamoy
- Guacamole
- Mole blanco
- Mole sauce
- Mole verde
- Pepian – green or red, meat, pork
- Salsa
- Salsa chipotle
- Salsa verde
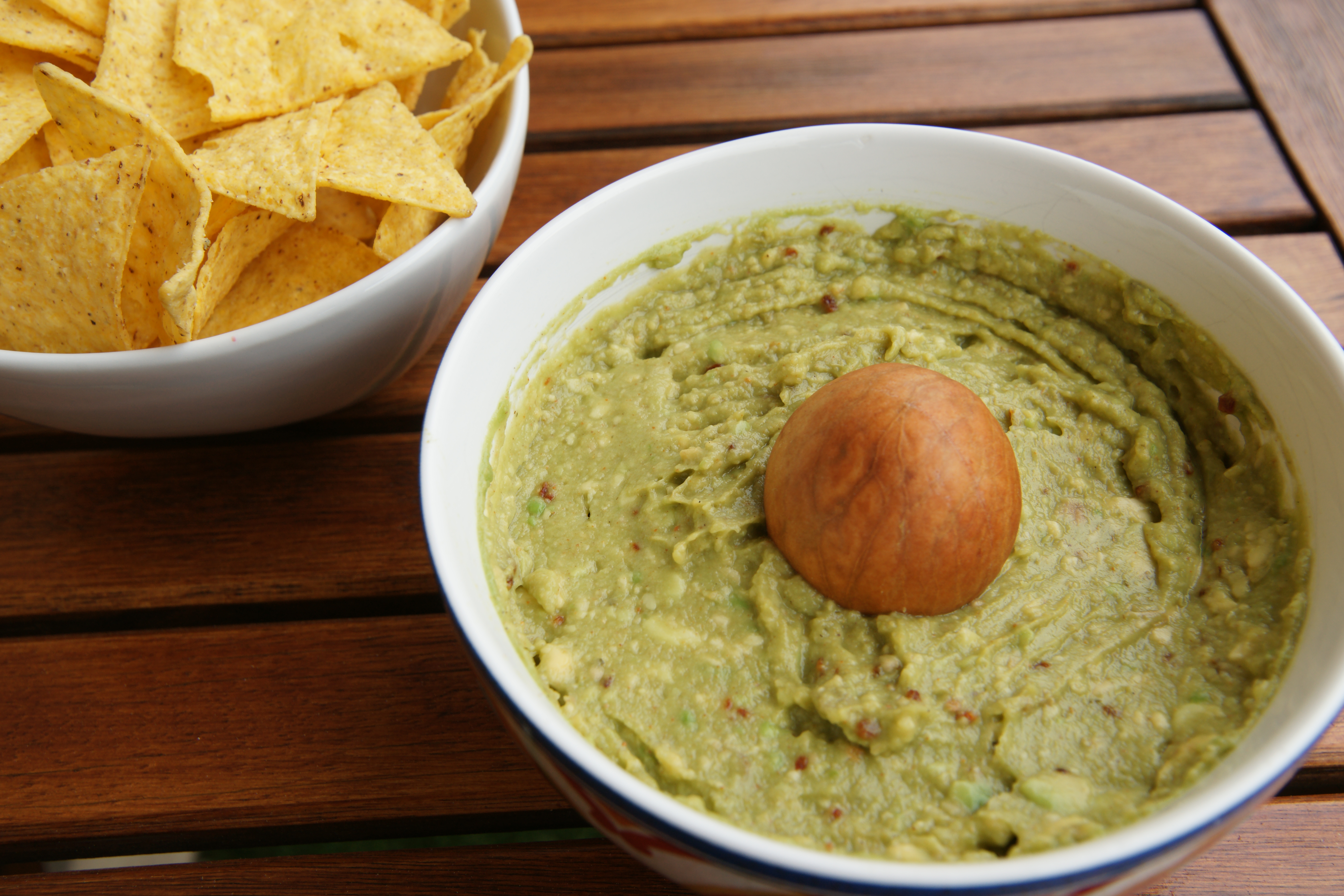
Guacamole with tortilla chips

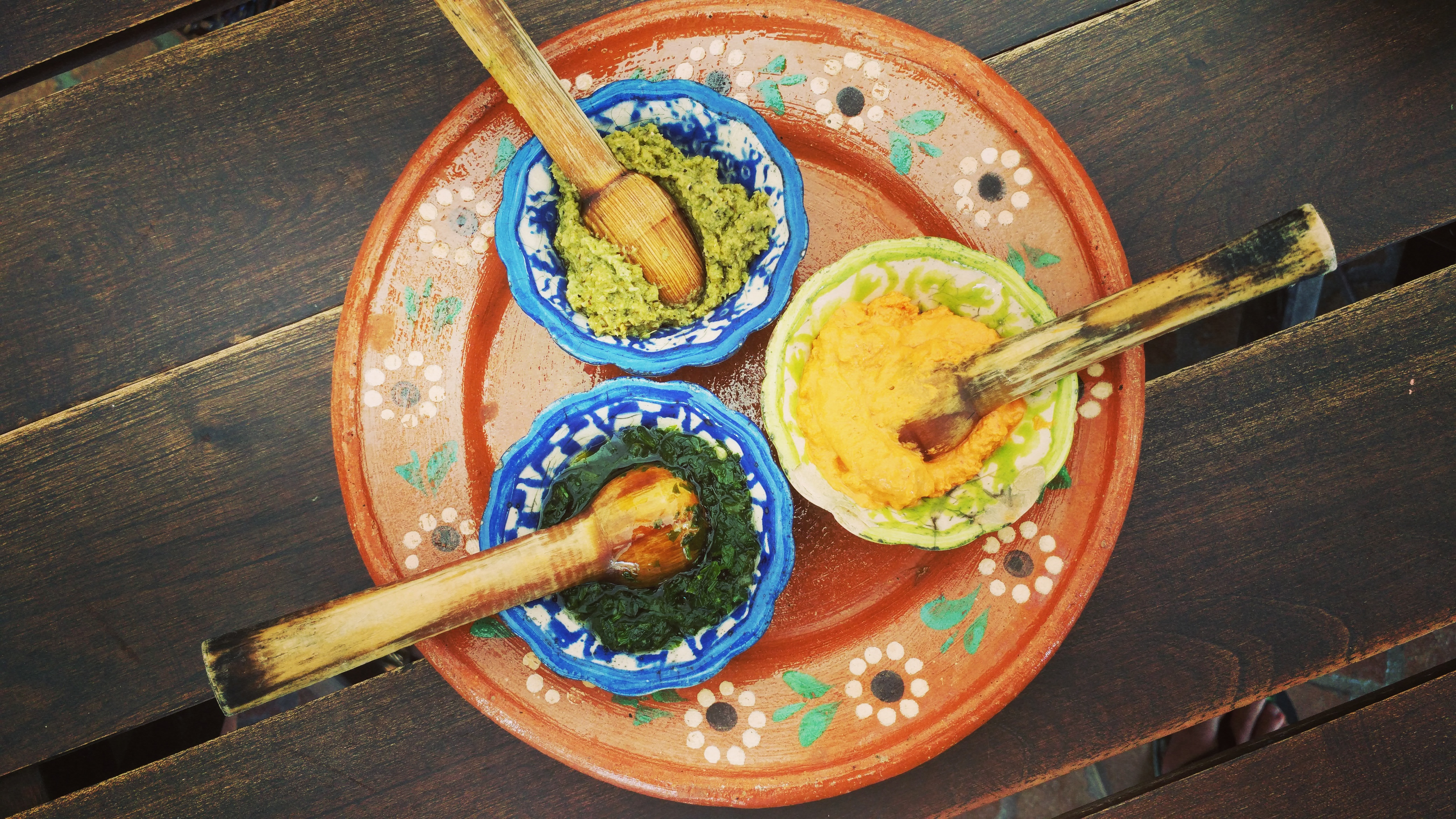
Habanero, chipotle and chimichurri salsas

== Rice and pasta dishes ==
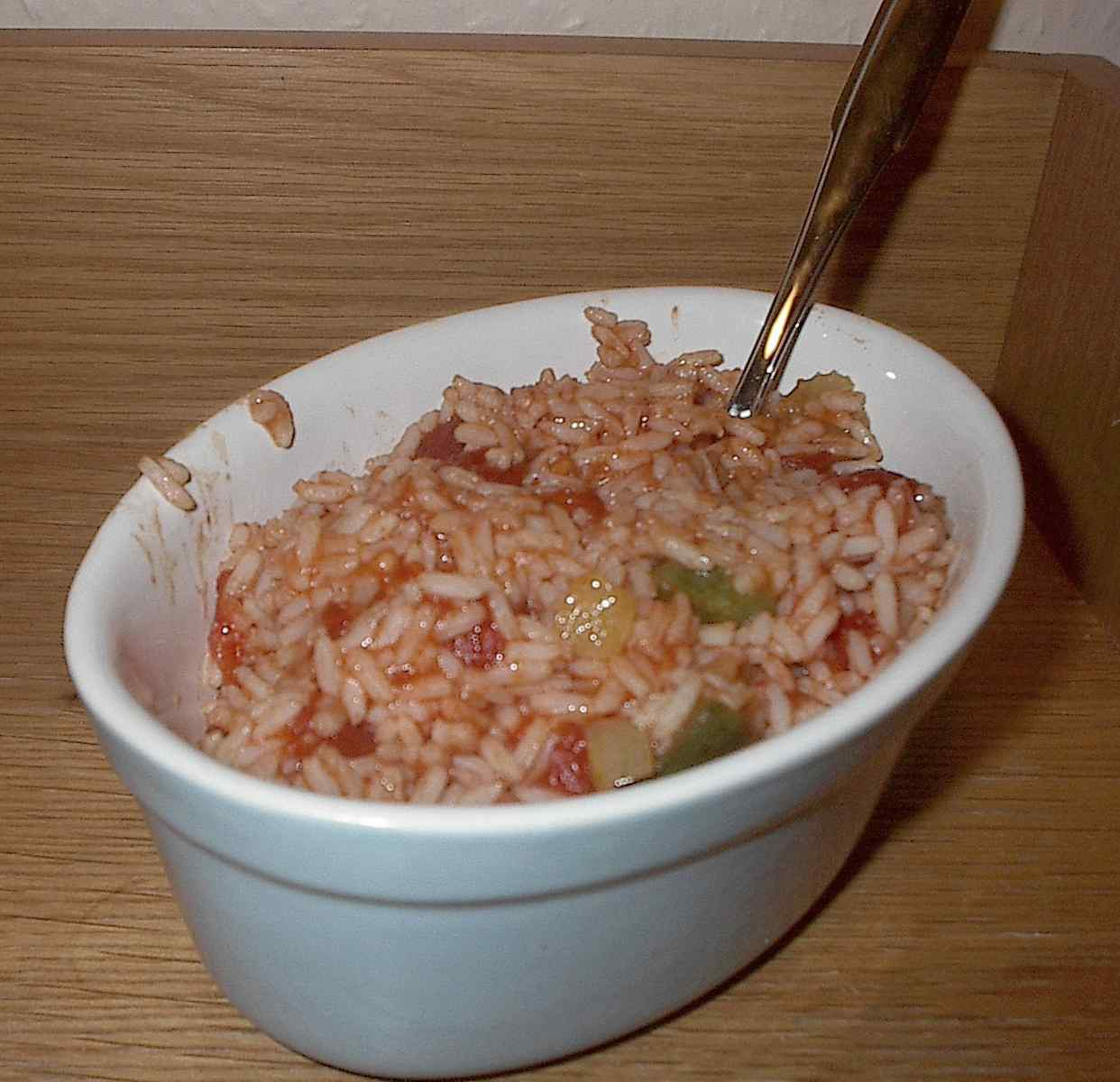
Arroz rojo (Spanish rice)

- Arroz a la tumbada (rice with seafood)
- Arroz con pollo (rice with chicken)
- Arroz negro (black rice)
- Arroz poblano
- Arroz rojo (red rice, Mexican rice, or Spanish rice)
- Green spaghetti, a celebration dish of spaghetti in a roasted poblano cream sauce
- Morisqueta

== Seafood dishes ==
- Aguachile
- Huachinango a la Veracruzana
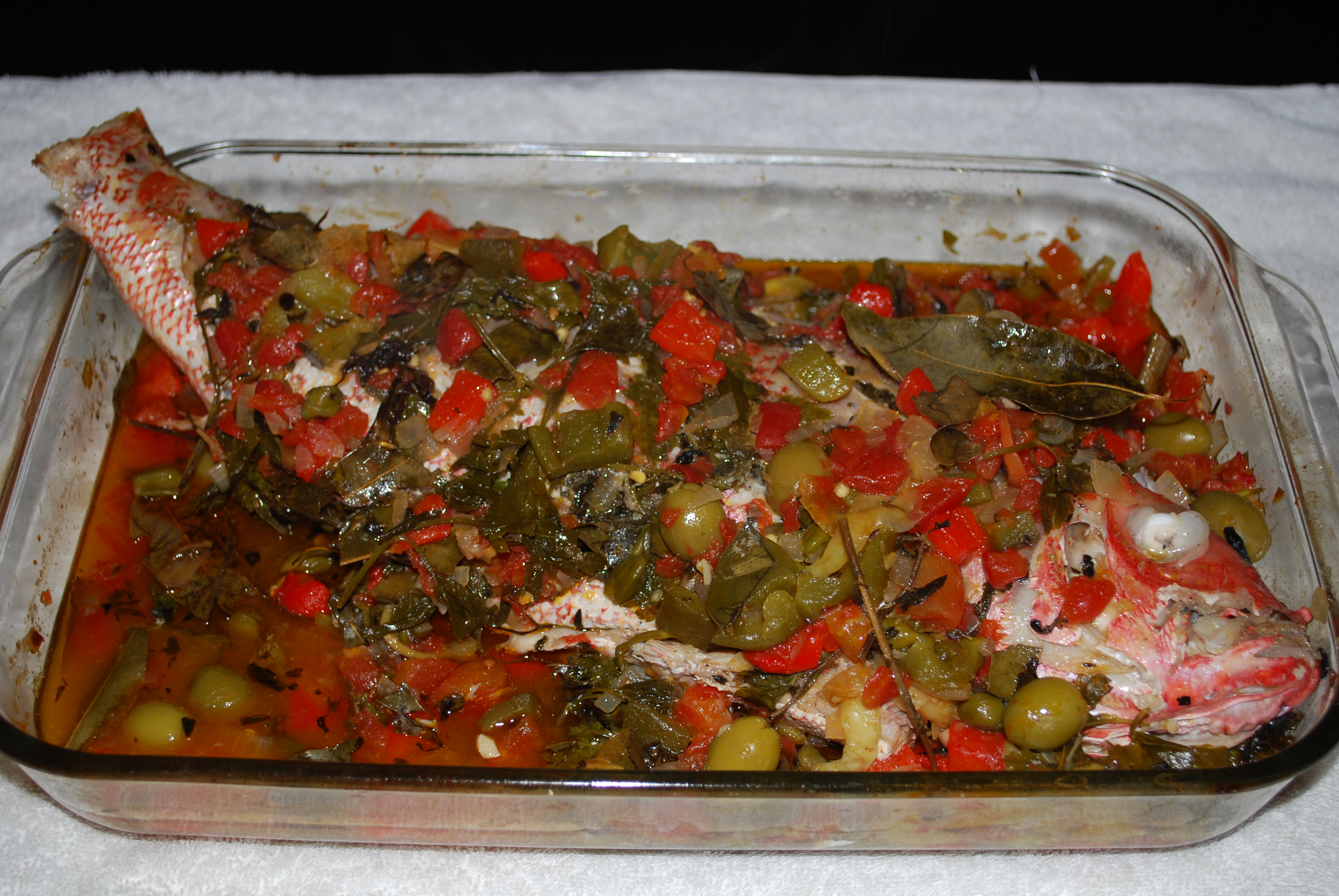
Huachinango a la Veracruzana (Veracruz-Style Red Snapper)

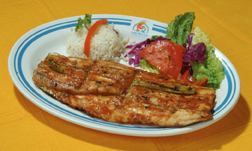
Pescado zarandeado

== Soups and stews ==
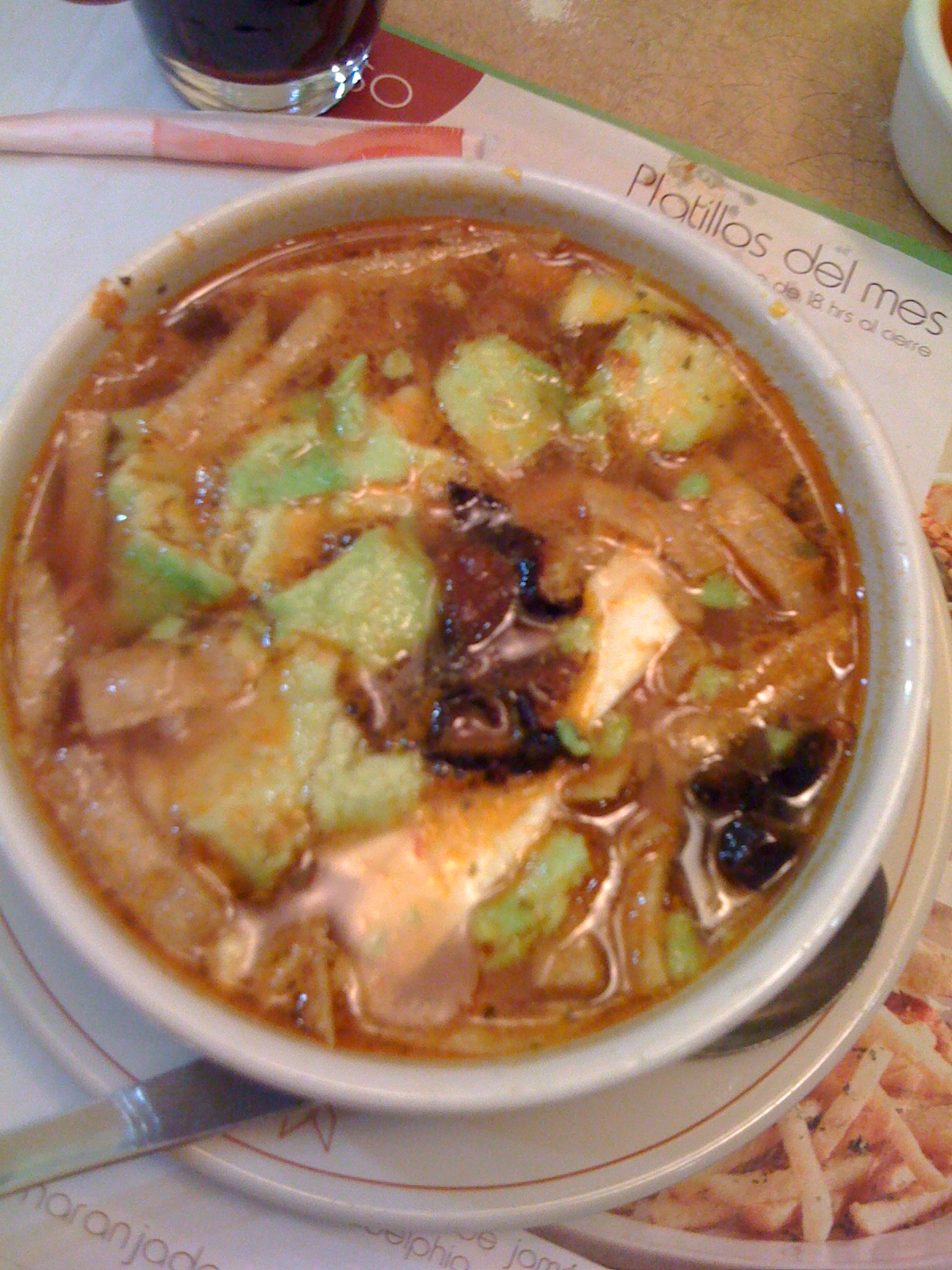
Caldo tlalpeño

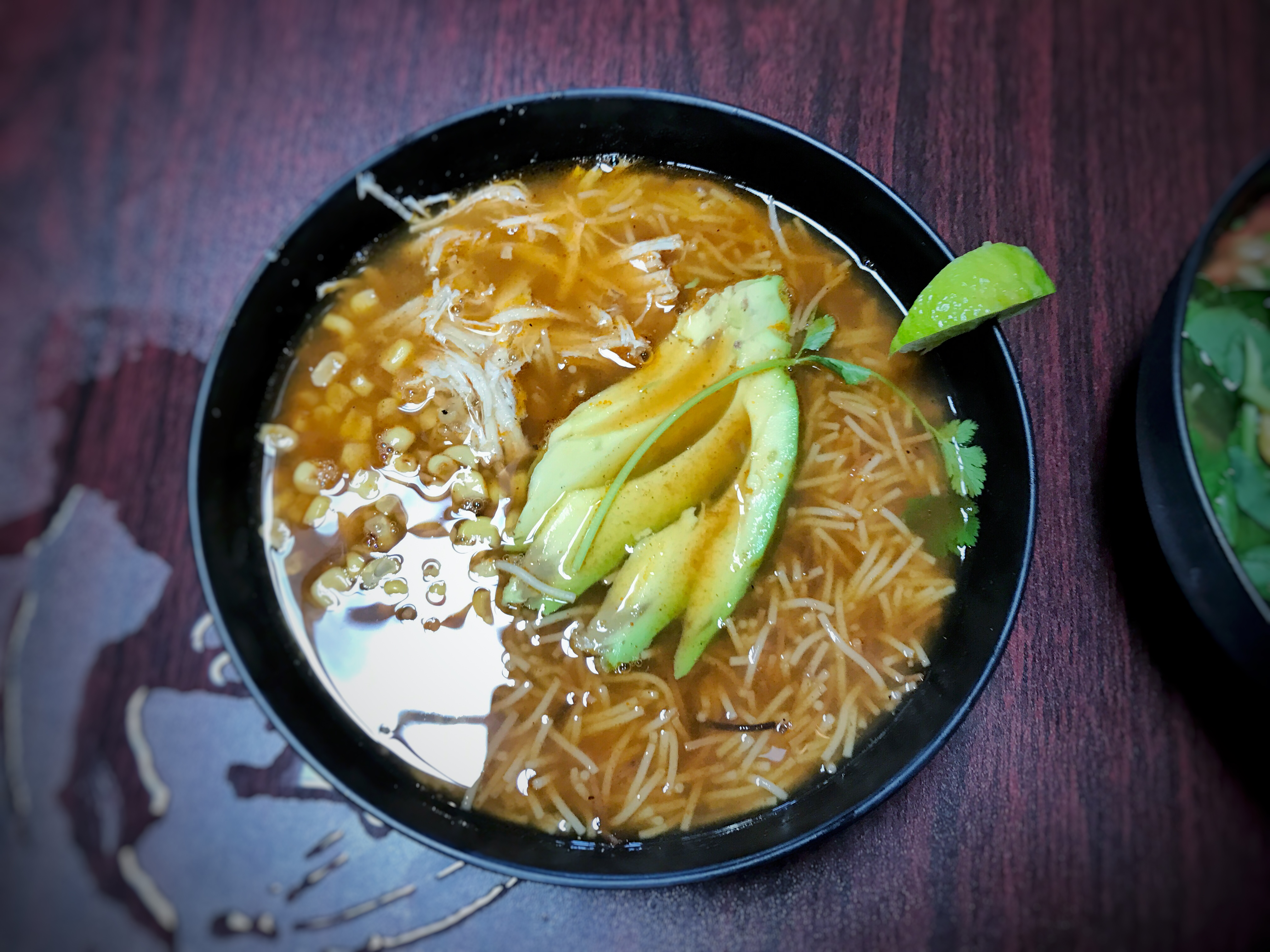
Sopa de fideo

- Birria
- caldo de pollo, chicken soup
- caldo de queso, cheese soup
- caldo de mariscos, seafood soup
- caldo tlalpeño, chicken, broth, chopped avocado, chile chipotle and fried tortilla strips or triangles – may include white cheese, vegetables, chickpeas, carrot, green beans
- Fideos (noodles)
- Menudo
- Pozole
- Sopa de fideo
- sopa de flor de calabaza
- Sopa de lima, from Yucatán
- Sopa de nueces, walnut soup
- Sopa de pollo (chicken soup)
- Sopa de tortilla (tortilla soup)

== Vegetable dishes ==
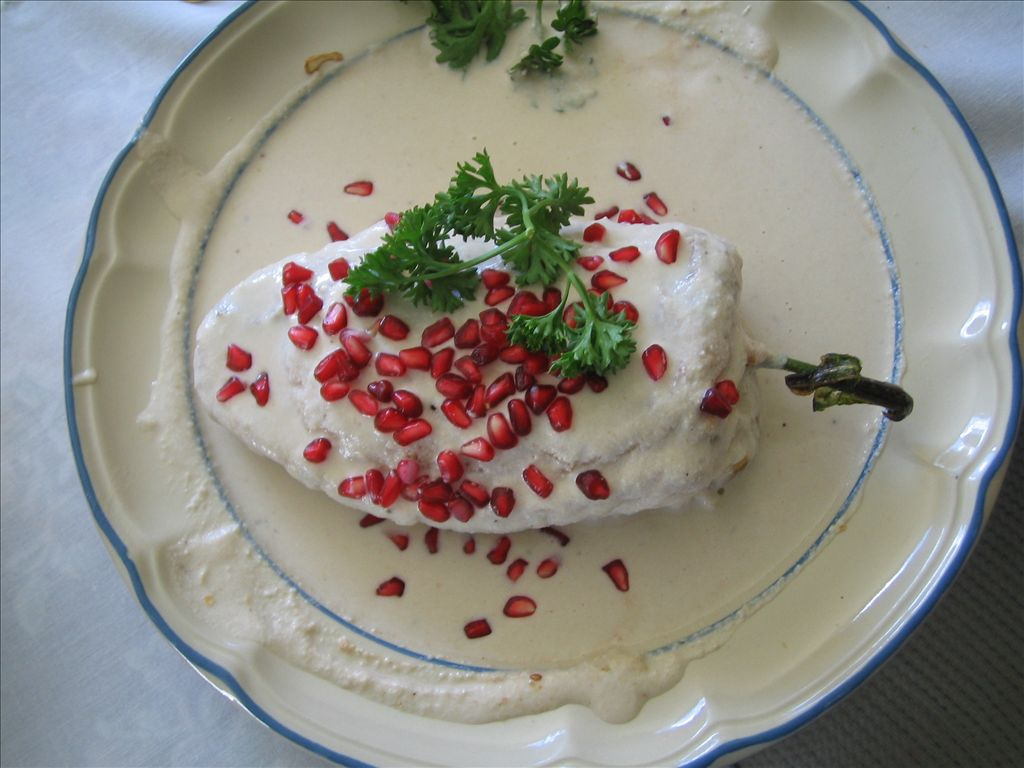
Chiles en nogada

- Chile relleno
- Chiles en nogada
- Cuitlacoche, a fungus that grows on corn plants, often served in soups
- Egg rolls
- Frijoles
- Frijoles pintos (pinto beans)
- Frijoles negros (black beans)
- Frijoles charros
- Frijoles Puercos
- Frijoles refritos (refried beans)
- Nopalitos
- Papas (potatoes)
- Pico de gallo

== Desserts and sweets ==
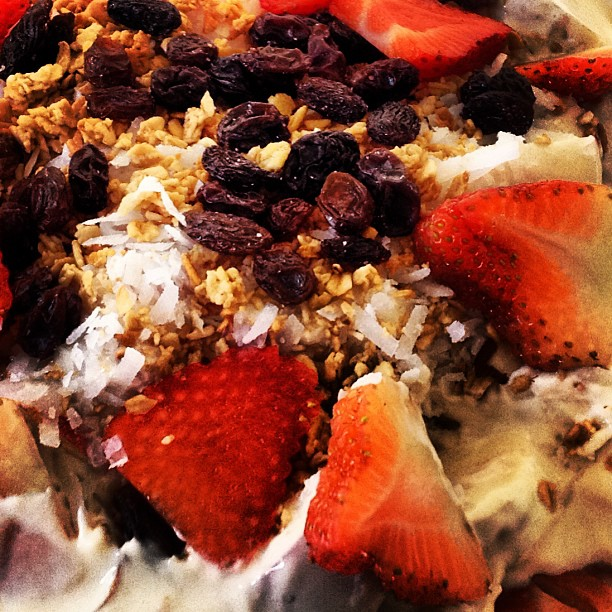
Close up shot of a bionico with strawberries, banana, raisins, shredded coconut and granola

Mexico's candy and bakery sweets industry, centered in Michoacán and Mexico City, produces a wide array of products.

- Alfajor
- Arroz con leche, rice pudding
- Bionico, type of fruit salad with cream or yogurt
- Borrachitos
- Buñuelos
- Brazo de gitano/Niño envuelto
- Caballero pobre
- Cajeta
- Cajeta envinada
  - Cajeta de piña y plátano
- Calabaza en tacha
- Calavera
- Capirotada
- Caramelo de miel
- Camote al vapor
- Cubierto
- Chacualole
- Champurrado
- Chongos zamoranos, cheese candy named for its place of origin, Zamora, Michoacán
- Chocolate
- Chocolate brownie
- Churros
- Cocadas
- Coconut candy
- Cochinito de Piloncillo
- Concha
- Coyotas
- Dulce de leche

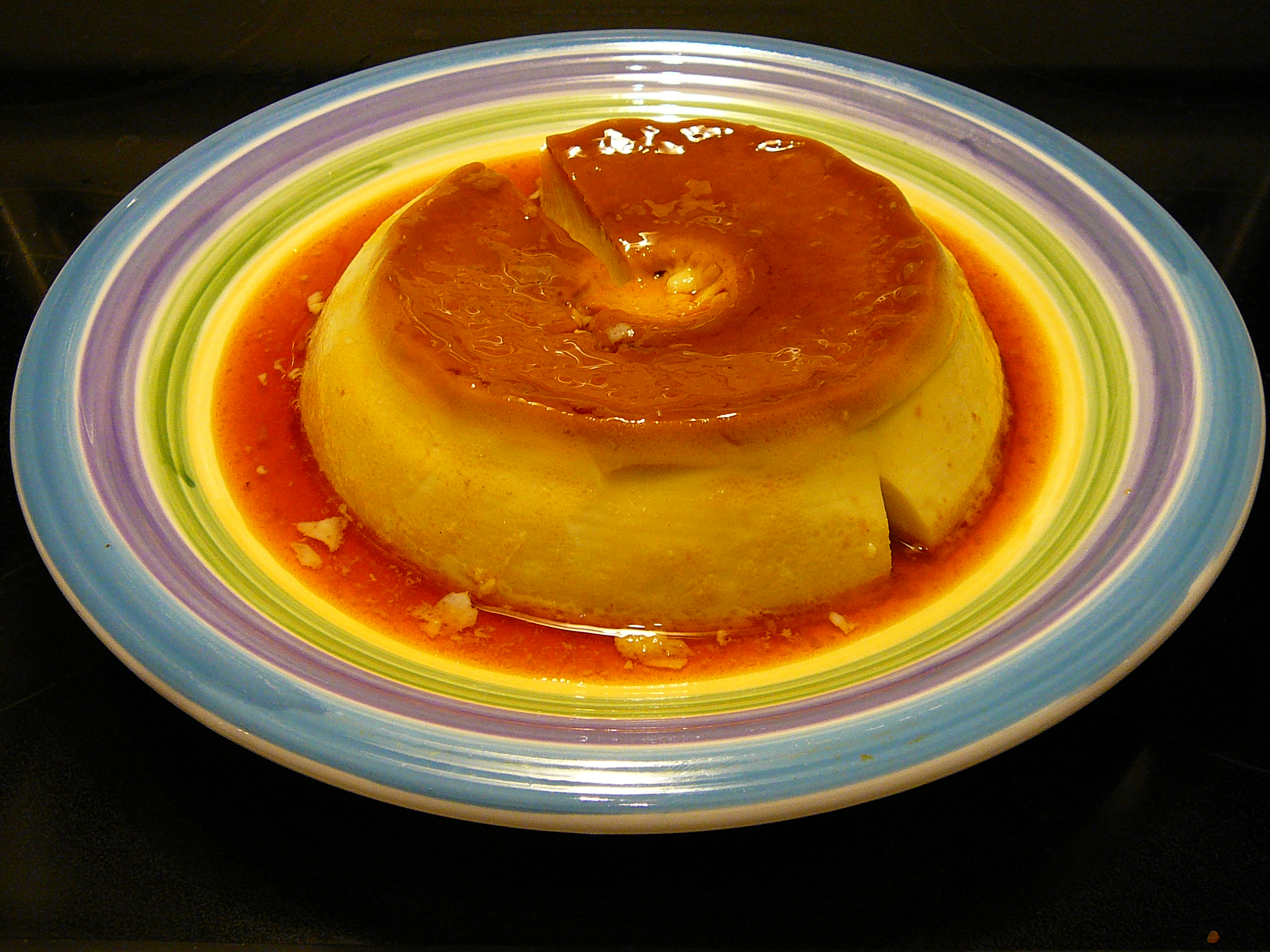
Flan

- Flan
- Fresas con crema
- Frozen banana
- Gorditas de nata
- Ice cream ("nieves" and "helados").
  - Fried ice cream
- Jericalla
- Manjar blanco
- Marie biscuit
- Marquesita
- Mazapán de Cacahuate
- Nicuatole
- Paletas, popsicles (or ice lollies), the street popsicle vendor is a noted fixture of Mexico's urban landscape.
- Palmier

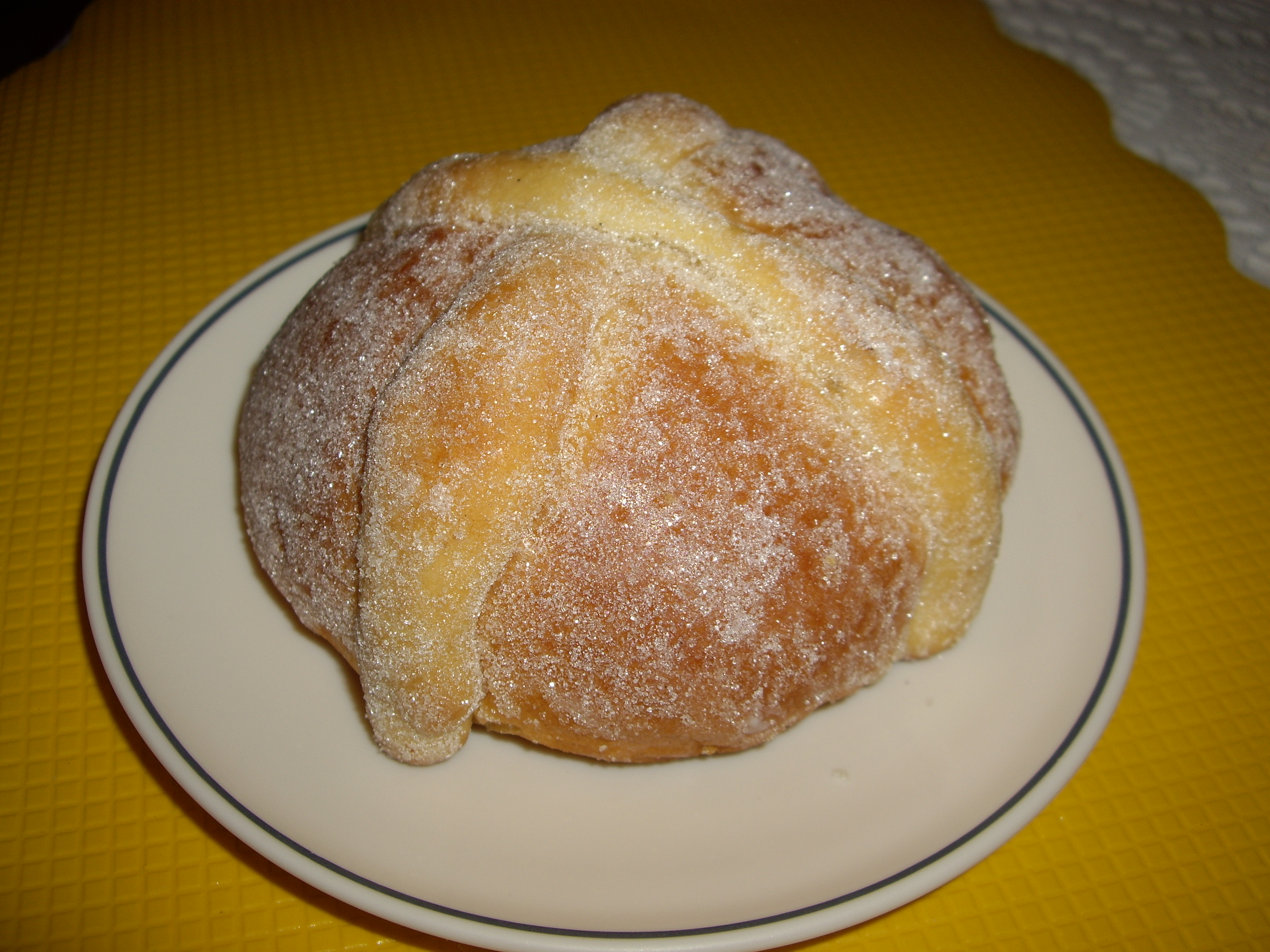
A piece of sugary pan de muerto

- Pan de muerto, sugar covered pieces of bread traditionally eaten at the Día de muertos festivity
- Pan dulce, sweet pastries in many shapes and sizes that are very popular for breakfast. Nearly every Mexican town has a bakery (panaderia) where these can purchased.
- Pastel de tres leches (Three Milk Cake)
- Plátanos Fritos
- Polvorón
- Raspado
- Rosca de reyes
- Rollo de guayaba con cajeta o jamoncillo
- Sopaipilla
- Tortitas de Santa Clara
- Biscochos
- Piñata cookie
- Platáno frito
- Jamoncillo
- Carlota de limón
- Dulce de tamarindo

== Beverages ==
=== Non-alcoholic ===
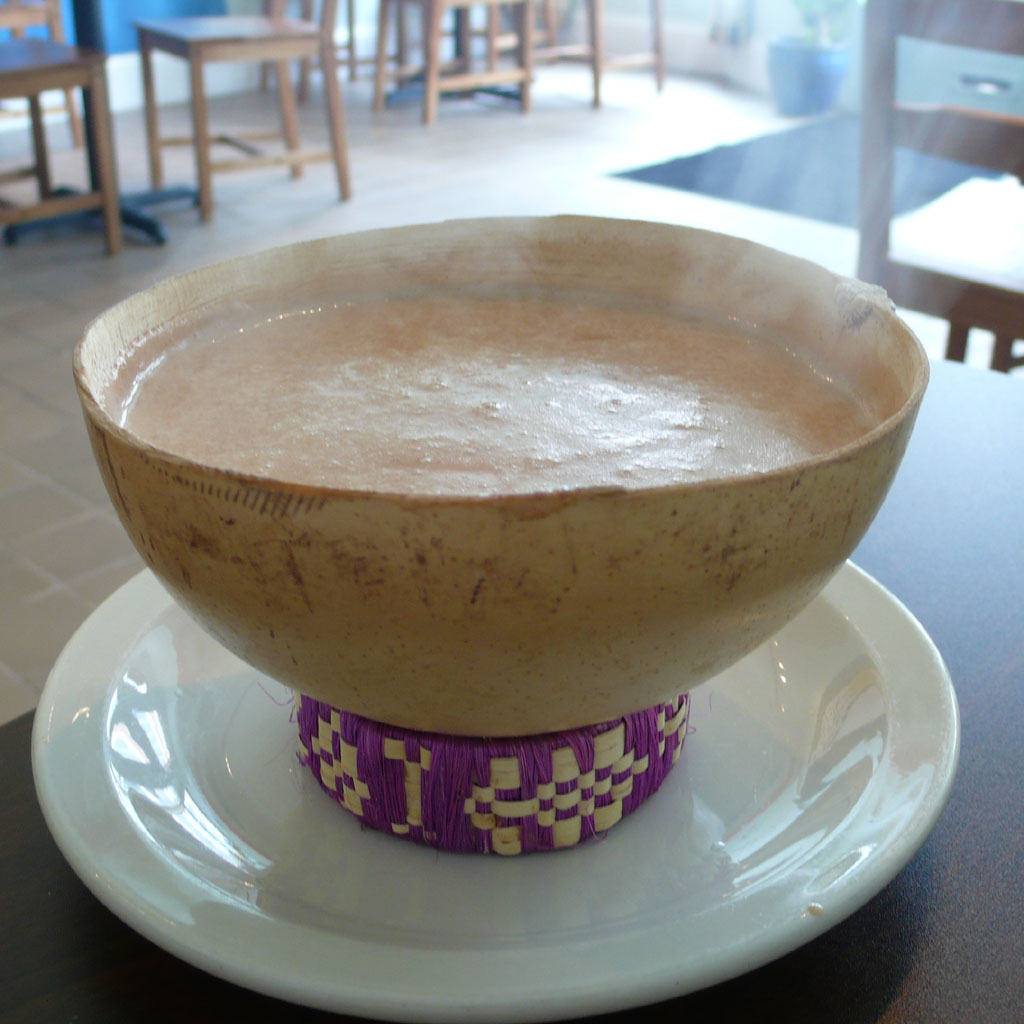
Hot bowl of champurrado as served at a Mexican breakfast

- Aguas frescas
- Atole
- Café de olla, coffee with cinnamon
- Chamoyada
- Champurrado
- Chia Fresca
- Chocolate, generally known better as a drink rather than a candy or sweet
- Hot chocolate
- Horchata
- Jamaica (drink)
- Jarritos (drink)
- Jugos frescos
- Lechuguilla
- Licuado, drink that includes banana, chocolate, and sugar
- Mangonada
- Mexican Coke
- Mexican tea culture
- Pópo
- Pozol
- Sangria Señorial
- Tascalate
- Tamarindo
- Tejate

=== Alcoholic ===
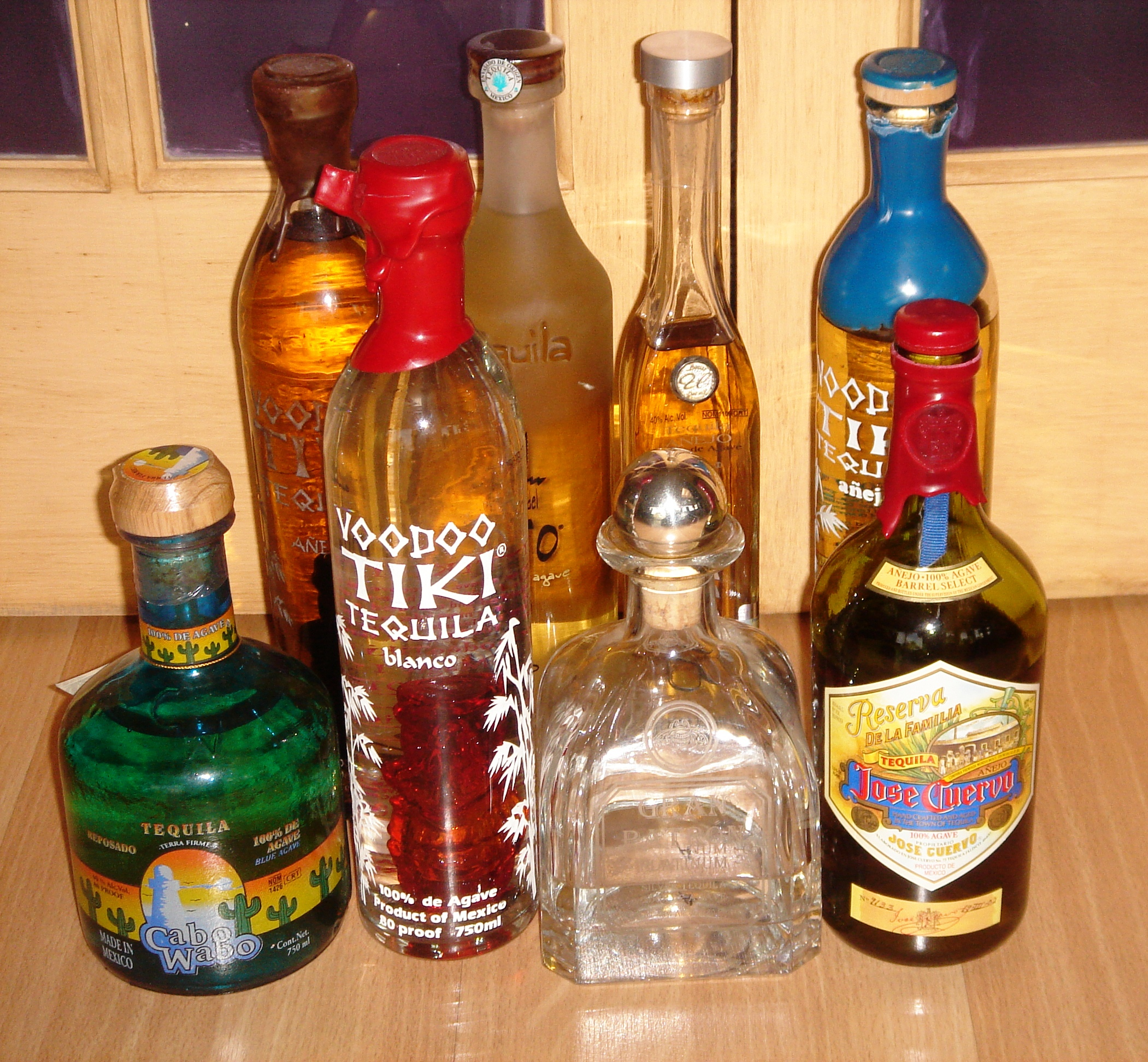
Tequilas of various styles

- Bacanora
- Cerveza, Mexican beers such as "Sol" and "Corona"
- Colonche
- Mexican wine
- Mezcal
- Michelada
- Pulque, popular drink of the Aztecs
- Sotol
- Tejuino
- Tepache
- Tequila
- Tubâ

== See also ==
- List of cuisines
- List of maize dishes
- List of tortilla-based dishes
- Mexican breads
- Mexican street food
- New Mexican cuisine
- Sopaipilla (not typical in Mexico, but common in New Mexico)
- Tex-Mex
