= Green rice =

Green rice may refer to:

- Cốm, a Vietnamese green rice dish
- Arroz poblano, a Mexican green rice dish
