= Black rice (disambiguation) =

Black rice refers to a range of rice types that are colored black.

Black rice may also refer to:

- Arròs negre, a Valencian and Catalan dish made with cuttlefish (or squid) and rice, somewhat similar to seafood paella
- Arroz negro (Mexican cuisine), a Mexican dish made with rice, in which its dark color comes from black bean broth
- Kola bora saul, a black glutinous rice used in Assamese cuisine, sometimes called black sticky rice
- Wild rice
