= Manchamanteles =

Mexican stew

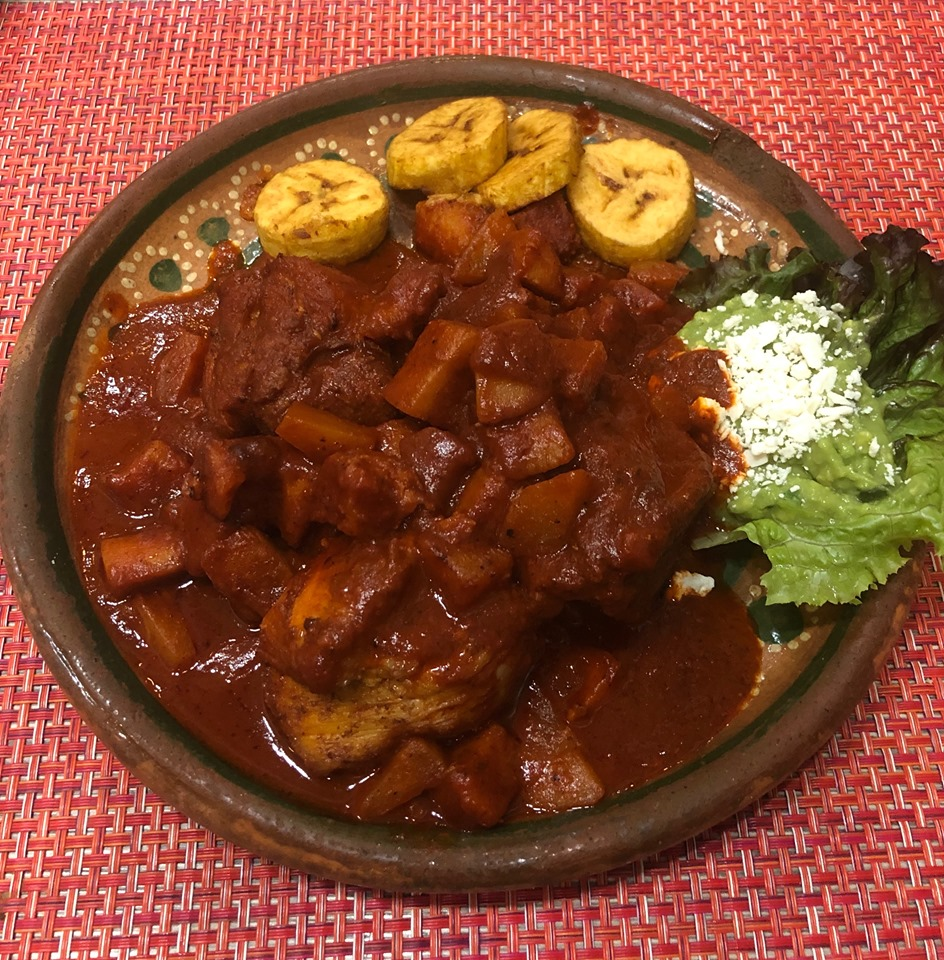
- Place of origin: Mexico

Manchamanteles (literally, "tablecloth stainer") in Mexican cuisine, is a stew of assorted meat, chili peppers, vegetables, and fruits. A typical recipe for mancha manteles contains chicken and/or pork, chorizo, pineapple, apple, banana, chili peppers, almonds, cinnamon, lard and tomatoes.

The sauce in manchamanteles is considered to be a kind of mole.

== Etymology ==
The name manchamanteles literally means "tablecloth stainer" in Spanish, a reference to the dish's tendency to stain linens with its deep red, chile-based sauce.

== History ==
Manchamanteles is traditionally associated with the colonial-era convents of Puebla and Oaxaca, the two Mexican states where the dish became most established. A 17th-century recipe collection attributed to Sor Juana Inés de la Cruz at the Convent of San Jerónimo in Mexico City includes a version of the dish among recipes that combine indigenous and Old World ingredients. A later 19th-century version appears in Libro de cocina de D. Jose Moreda (1832), a manuscript preserved in a public library in Oaxaca.

== Place among the moles ==
Manchamanteles is widely classified as one of the "seven moles" of Oaxacan cuisine, alongside mole negro, rojo, coloradito, amarillo, verde, and chichilo, although it is also claimed by Puebla as a Pueblan dish. The word mole derives from the Nahuatl mulli, meaning "sauce" or "stew", and the dish is built around a thick, chile-based sauce in keeping with that tradition.

== Ingredients and preparation ==
Authoritative culinary sources describe the sauce as combining ancho or chilhuacle chiles with cinnamon, clove, pepper, onion, almond, thyme, oregano, and garlic, finished with chunks of tropical fruit including pineapple, plantain, apple, and pear. The pork or chicken is typically simmered in the sauce together with the fruit, producing a flavor profile that balances spicy, smoky, and sweet notes.

== See also ==
- List of Mexican dishes
