= Romeritos =

Mexican dish

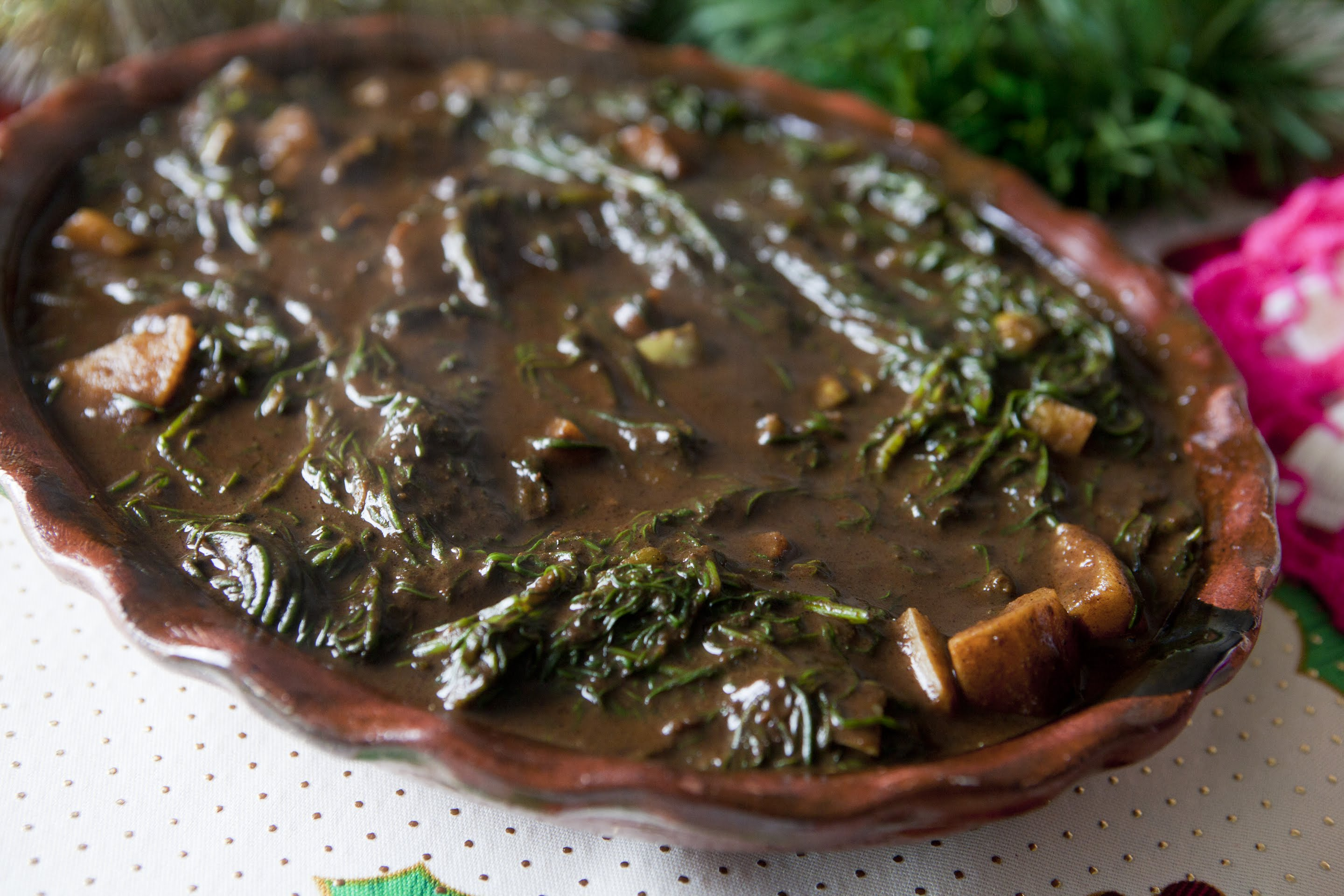
Romeritos

Romeritos is a Mexican dish from Central Mexico, consisting of tender sprigs of seepweed (Suaeda spp.) that are boiled or steamed and sometimes served in a mole poblano flavored with dried shrimp.

Typical additional ingredients include boiled potatoes, nopales, and shrimp—sometimes fritters of dried shrimp with bread slices and in tacos. They are traditionally enjoyed at Christmas and Lent.

The type of seepweed used depends on the region. The plant is known as romerito in Spanish. That name in English means "little rosemary"; some seepweed species can vaguely resemble such a plant when fresh, but neither the taste nor the fragrance is similar in any way. The dish dates back to the Aztecs.

== See also ==
- List of Mexican dishes
- Suaeda pulvinata
