= Chilorio =

Mexican pork dish from state of Sinaloa

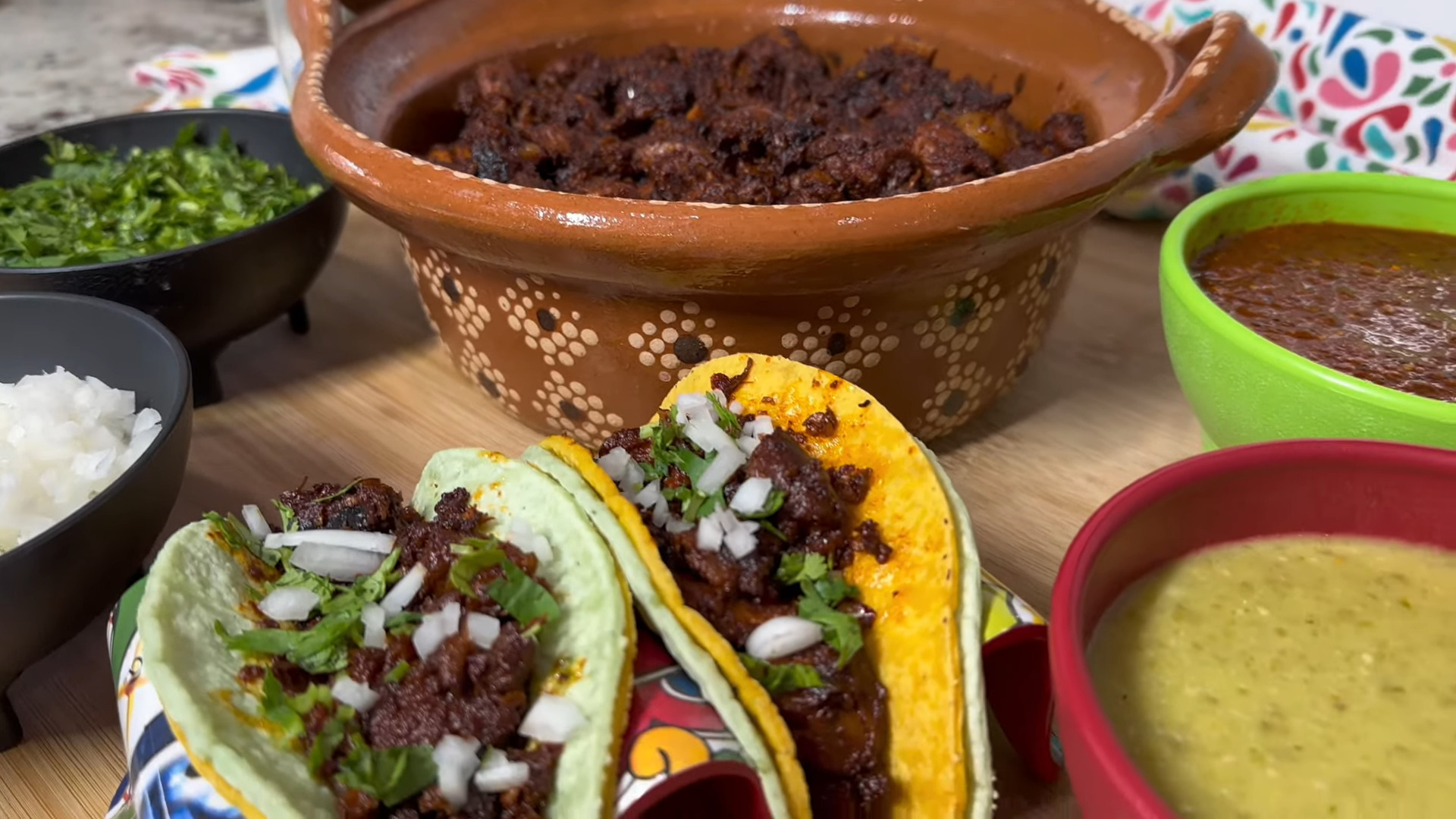
Tacos filled with chilorio and a pot with chilorio

Chilorio is a pork dish from the Mexican state of Sinaloa. Chilorio is generally made from pork fried in chili sauce.

In making chilorio, pork is slow-simmered for hours until it falls apart. It is then broken into bite size pieces, fried in lard, and cooked in a chile sauce made from re-hydrated dried chiles. The sauce is usually flavored with onions, cumin and garlic.

== History ==
This recipe has been known for approximately 300 years and is believed to have been used as a means of preserving stewed meat, as the seasonings act as natural preservatives just like lard, in the same way as a sausage, only this one does not come packed in any casing or membrane.

== Preparation ==
For the preparation of chilorio, as it is prepared in Sinaloa, it is very important that all of its ingredients are of good quality.

Pork meat, chile pasilla, and spices (such as garlic, salt, cumin, and oregano) are used. The meat is put to cook in a container according to the amount of pork that is going to be prepared; once the meat is cooked, it is mixed with the paste of the other ingredients that have been prepared previously, and it is begun to stir with a wooden shovel until the meat and paste are totally integrated; it is continued stirring until the meat and other ingredients are already integrated and have the reddish color of the chili.

It is served with corn or flour tortillas (very popular in northern Sinaloa) to prepare the taquitos, with lettuce, enchiloza sauce, pickled onion, and lime.

== Consumption ==
It is mainly consumed in northern Mexico, but with industrial packaging in cans or plastic bags it has reached all corners of the country. The approximate cost of a quarter of machaca and a quarter of a kilo of chilorio is approximately $150.00 in the City of Mazatlán, according to people from this city. It is prepared either in wheat or corn tortilla tacos accompanied by guacamole or red sauce, in enchiladas, in sandwiches or accompanying a salad with avocado.

In the state of Sinaloa this product is so versatile that it can be eaten stewed with just a little onion or scrambled with eggs.

== See also ==
- List of Mexican dishes
