= Pollo motuleño =

Mexican chicken dish

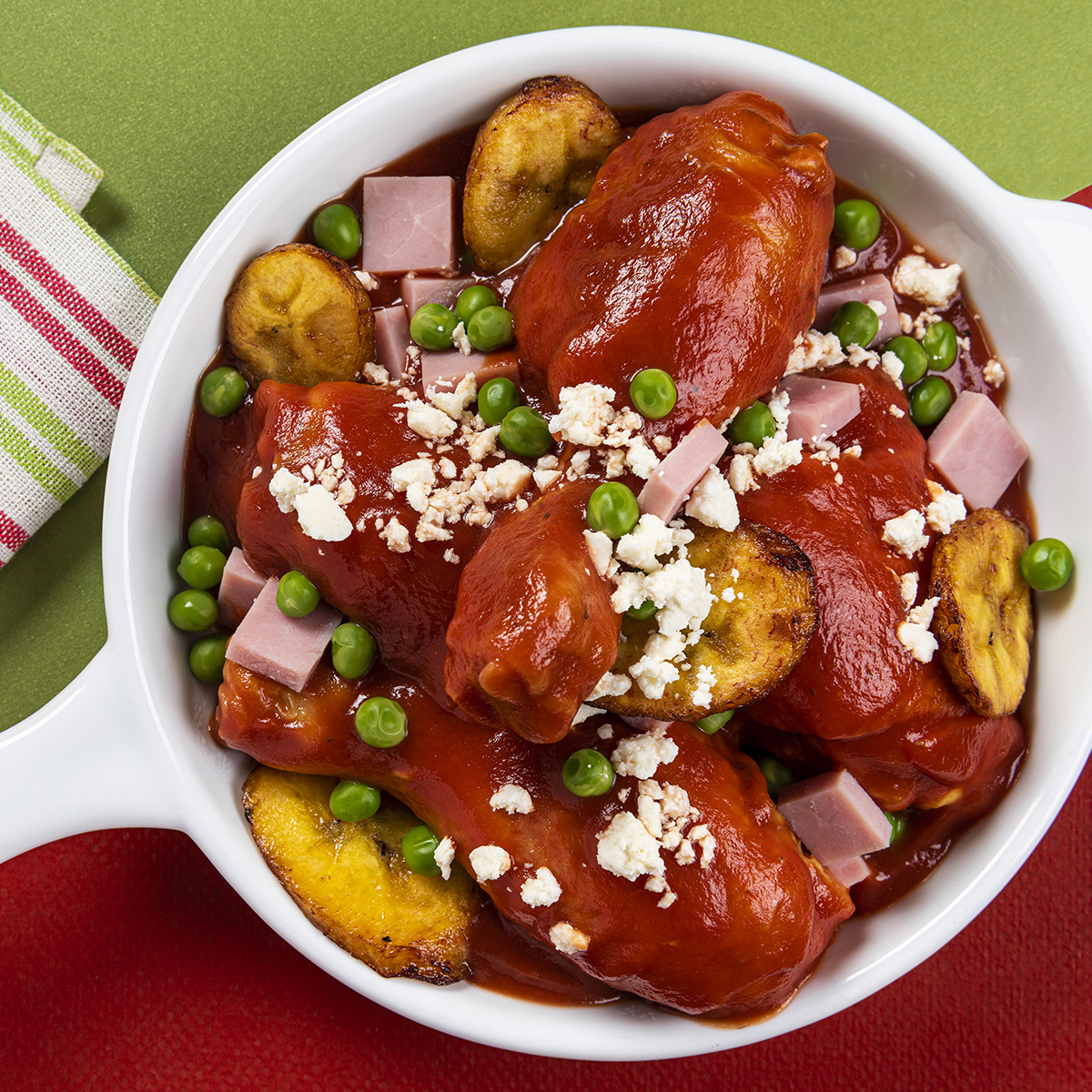
Pollo motuleño

Pollo motuleño is a dish originating from the town of Motul, Yucatán. For this dish, chicken is cooked with orange juice, achiote and plantains.

== See also ==
- List of Mexican dishes
