= Marquesita =

Yucatec dessert

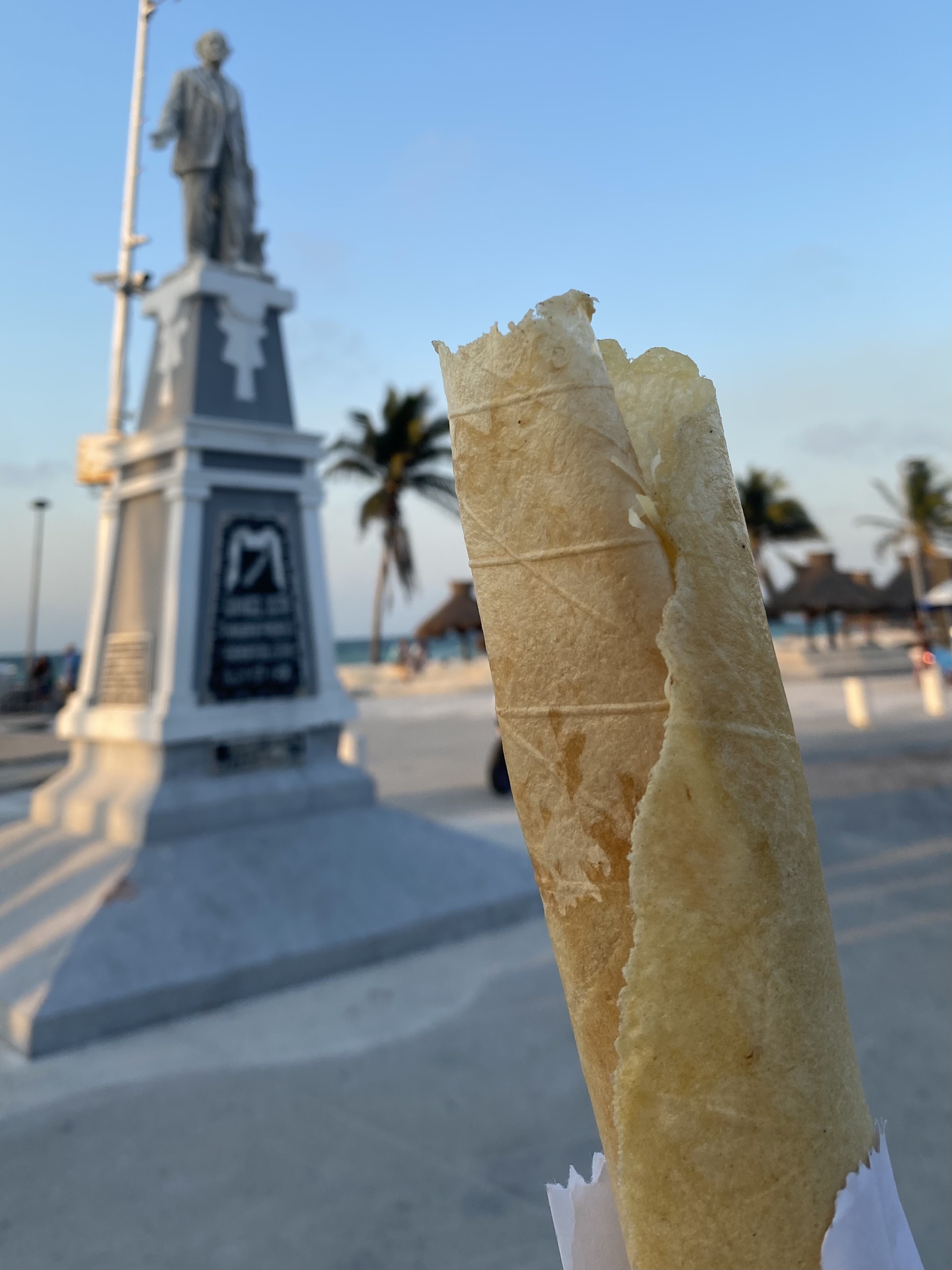
- Marquesita
- Type: Pastry
- Place of origin: Mexico
- Region or state: Yucatán
- Created by: Leopoldo Mena
- Main ingredients: flour, egg, milk, butter, various toppings including cajeta, jam, chocolate, or edam cheese

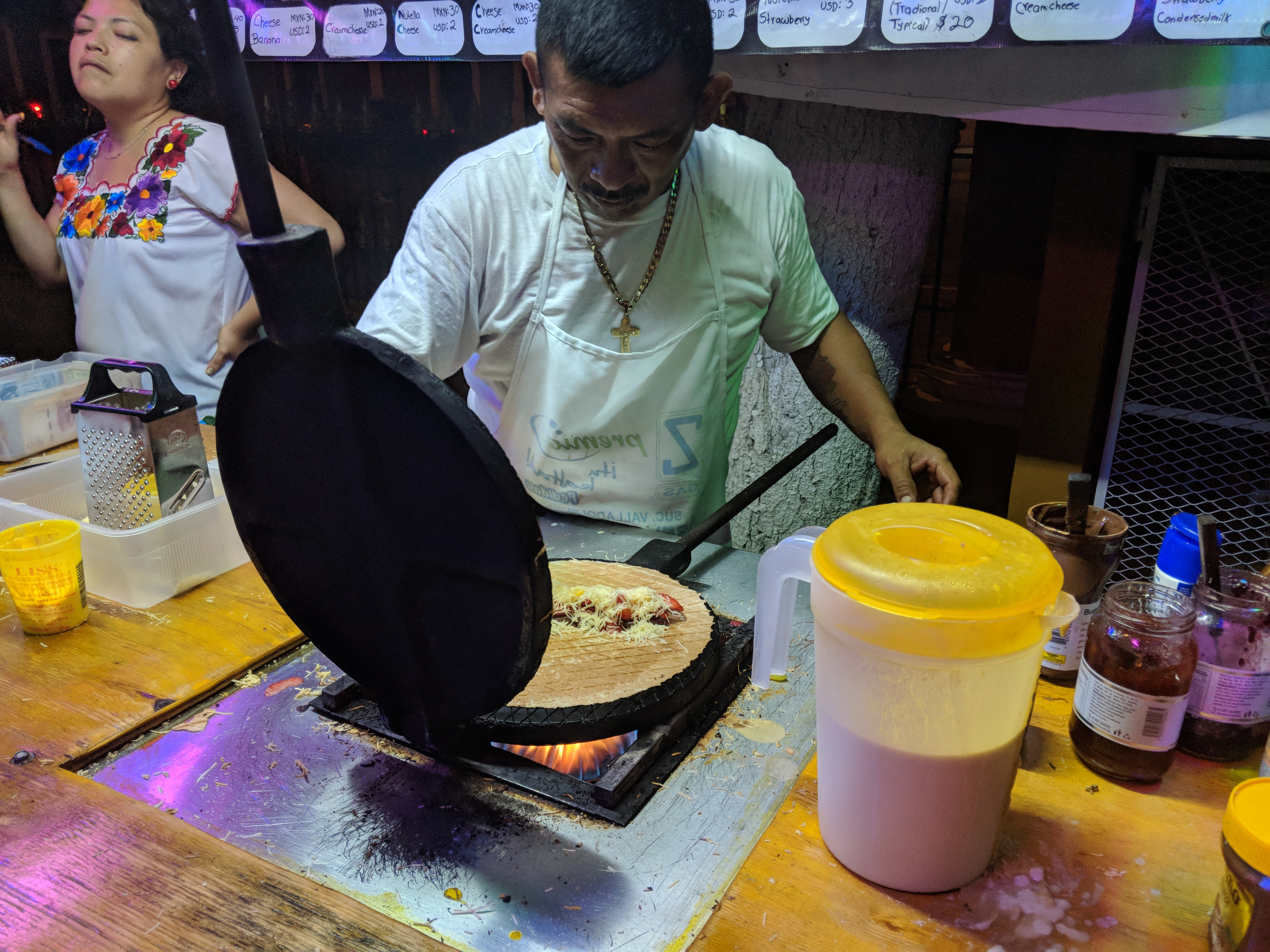
Man making marquesitas

A marquesita is a dessert native to the state of Yucatán, Mexico. It consists of a crepe, rolled and filled with cajeta, condensed milk, jam, chocolate or edam cheese, also known as queso de bola. They are sold in squares, parks and streets.

== History ==
Marquesitas were created in the 1930s by Leopoldo Mena, an ice cream business owner, who did not have as many customers in the winter season. To attract more customers, he invented a new sweet and integrated the sweet taste of jams with the salty taste of queso de bola, which became a success. The origin of the name comes from the daughters of a marquis who frequented the place and bought the sweet.

== Preparation ==
The ingredients of the marquesita consist of a dough of flour, egg, milk, and butter that is pressed on a grill to make a thin crepe. Then, the cheese and sweets are added and rolled.

== Varieties ==
Although they are originally from Yucatán, these sweets can be found in other states of Mexico.
