= Molote =

Mexican dish

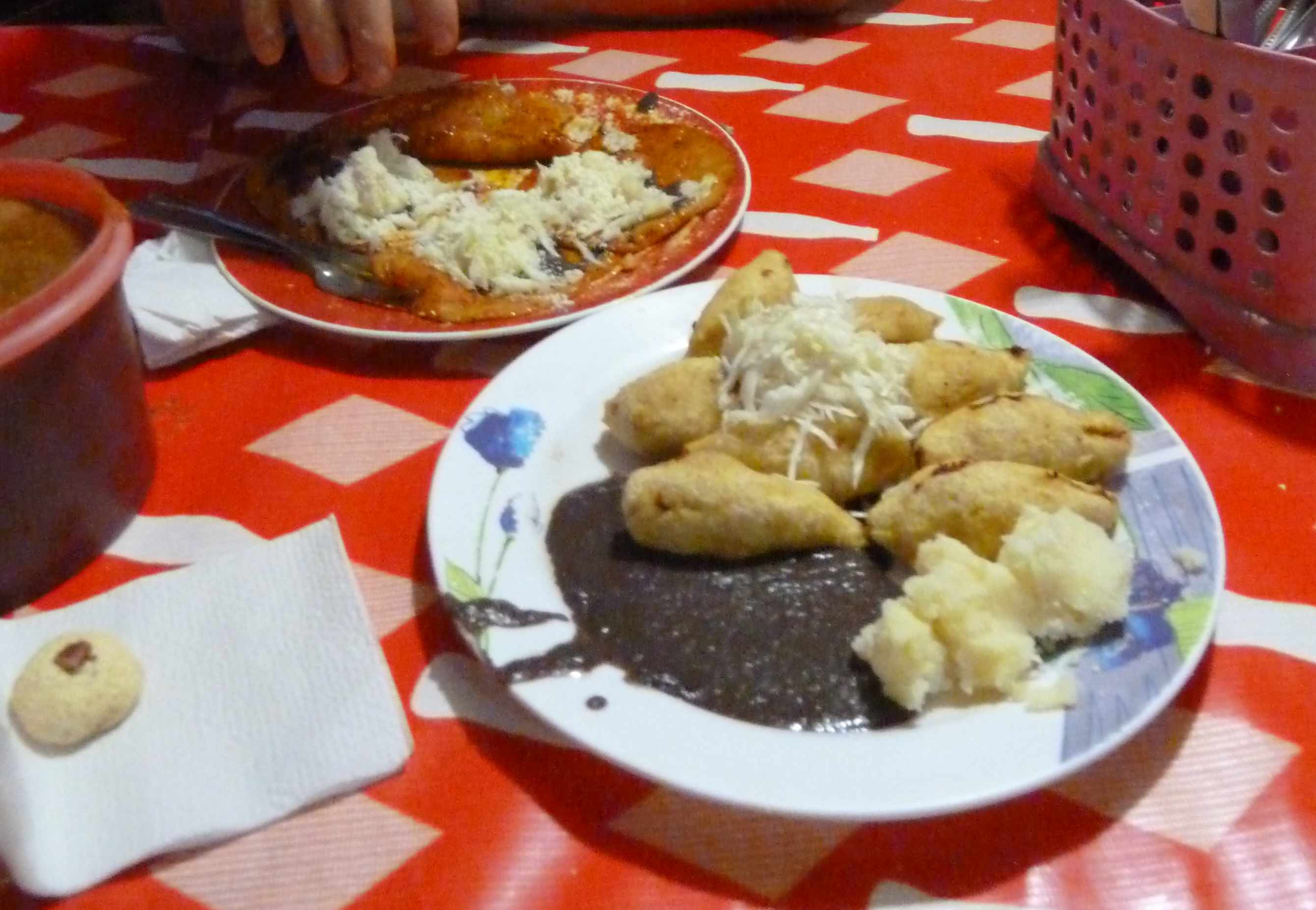
Molotes

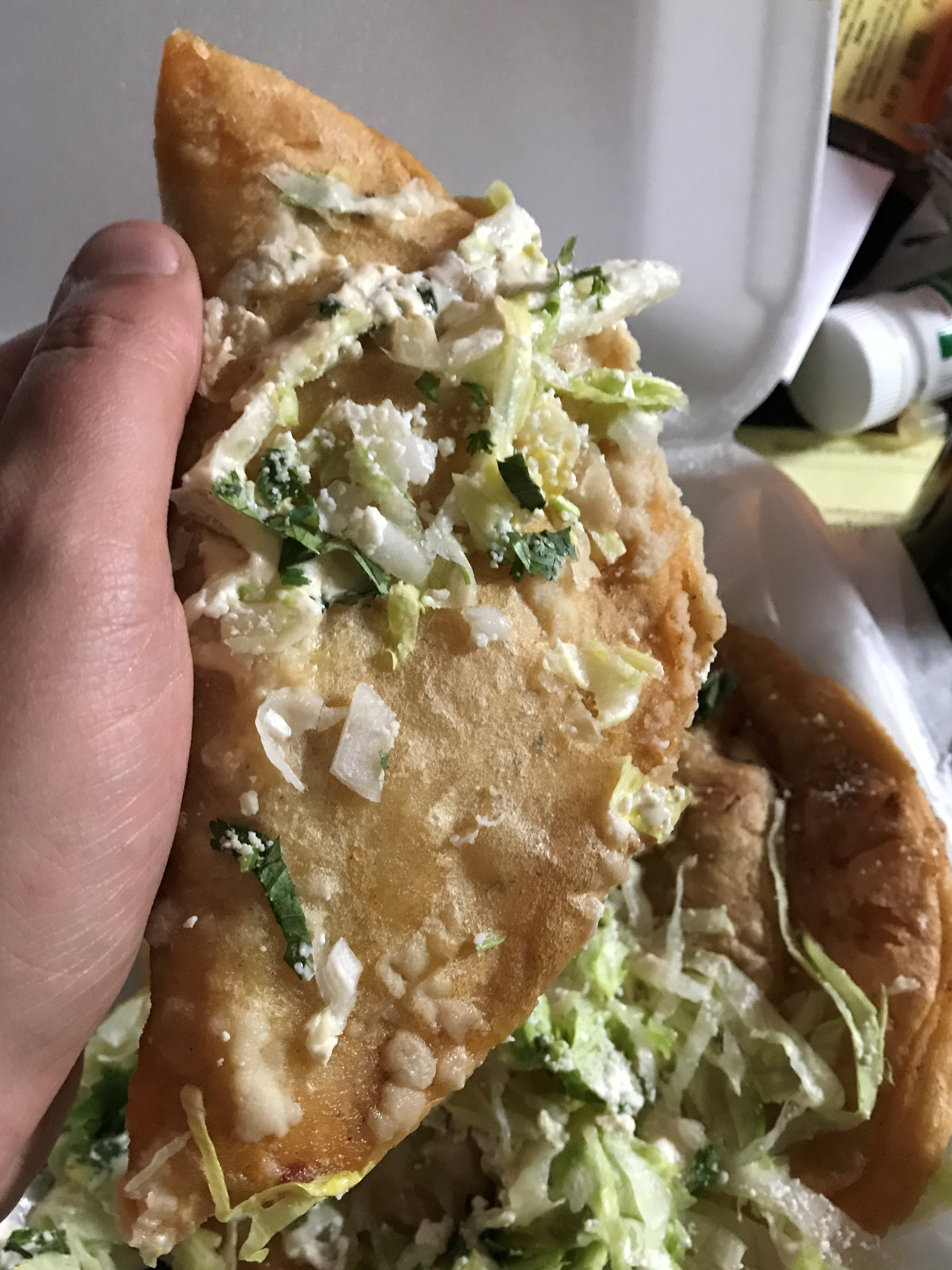
Mexican molote pastry

Molote is part of Mexican cuisine, especially within the category of antojitos (street snacks). It is a popular food in several states of Mexico.

Molotes are considered a traditional dish from Oaxaca. Throughout their history, they have been compared to gorditas or closed quesadillas; however, they differ in both their basic ingredients and the variety of fillings they contain, such as fresh cheese, rajas (sliced chili peppers), potato, tinga, and others. One of the fundamental ingredients that gives molotes their characteristic crispy texture is the dough, along with potato. The dough is typically a unified mixture of nixtamalized corn masa, which is then deep-fried. Molotes are especially associated with the states of Oaxaca, Puebla and Veracruz, particularly the city of Papantla, Veracruz.

== History ==
The history of this dish dates back to colonial times, when the Spanish introduced new culinary elements that transformed pre-Hispanic cuisine. Clear examples include ingredients such as tinga, quesillo (Oaxacan cheese), and chicharrón (fried pork skin).

The preparation of molotes has evolved significantly over time, with new filling variations being created. This has allowed for experimentation with different flavors and textures. Molotes are part of Oaxaca’s gastronomy, which has continuously adapted, changed, and reinvented itself, particularly in the city of Oaxaca de Juarez. The dish is made from nixtamalized corn dough, filled with ingredients such as potato, cheese, or tinga, and then fried in abundant oil.

== See also ==
- (corn-based) Empanadas.
