= Nicuatole =

Traditional Mexican dessert

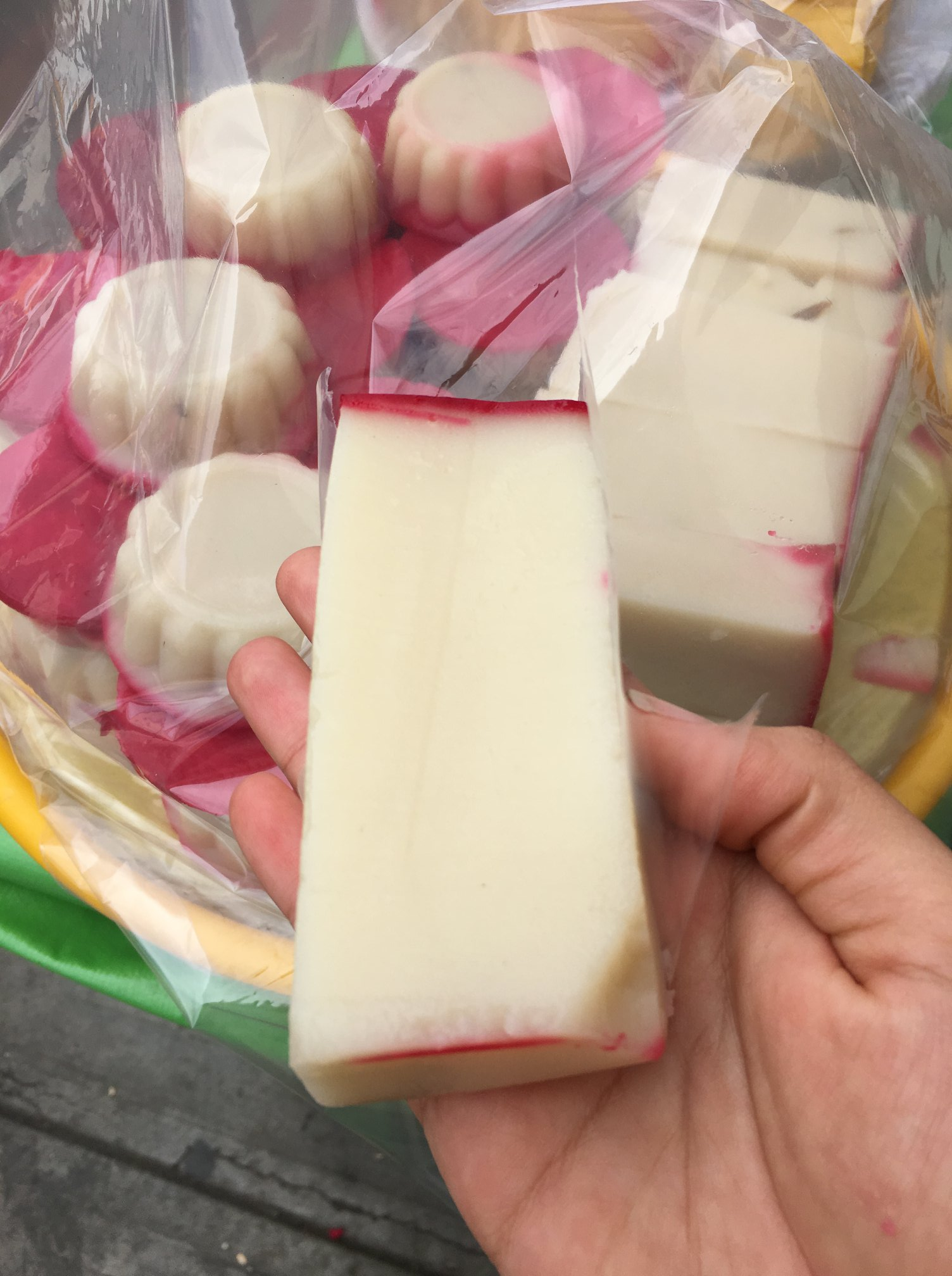
- Course: Dessert
- Place of origin: Mexico
- Region or state: Oaxaca
- Main ingredients: Ground maize, sugar

Nicuatole is a pre-Columbian gelatinous dessert made from ground maize and sugar, traditional in Oaxaca, Mexico. It may be flavored with coconut, pineapple, milk, mango and other seasonal fruits.

It can be found for sale in the markets of Valles Centrales, typically cut in squares on banana or custard apple leaves or in small layers. Nicuatole is commonly made with vanilla, almond, pineapple, chocolate, peach, tejate, shredded coconut or fragrant prickly pear, and sometimes the water is mixed or substituted with milk. Nicuatole is linked to the municipality of San Agustín Yatareni, with Doña Juana Agustín Martínez being the first person known to produce it, in the nineteenth century. The recipe, however, presumably has pre-Hispanic origins. Since 2011, a Nicuatole Fair has been held in this municipality. In Jalapa de Díaz, a nicuatole of corn, milk and sugar, without cinnamon, is prepared. Nicuatole is commonly eaten as a snack in festivals like the Guelaguetza.

== See also ==
- Atole
