= Cajeta de piña y plátano =

Fruit paste from Mexican cuisine

Cajeta de piña y plátano or Pineapple and banana dessert is a sweet fruit paste found in Mexican cuisine. There is a recipe for it published in a 19th-century cookbook from Guadalajara. It is made with crushed pineapple and mashed bananas blended with sugar syrup and baked until a thick, dark brown paste is obtained. It can be served with queso fresco.
