= Arroz poblano =

Mexican rice dish

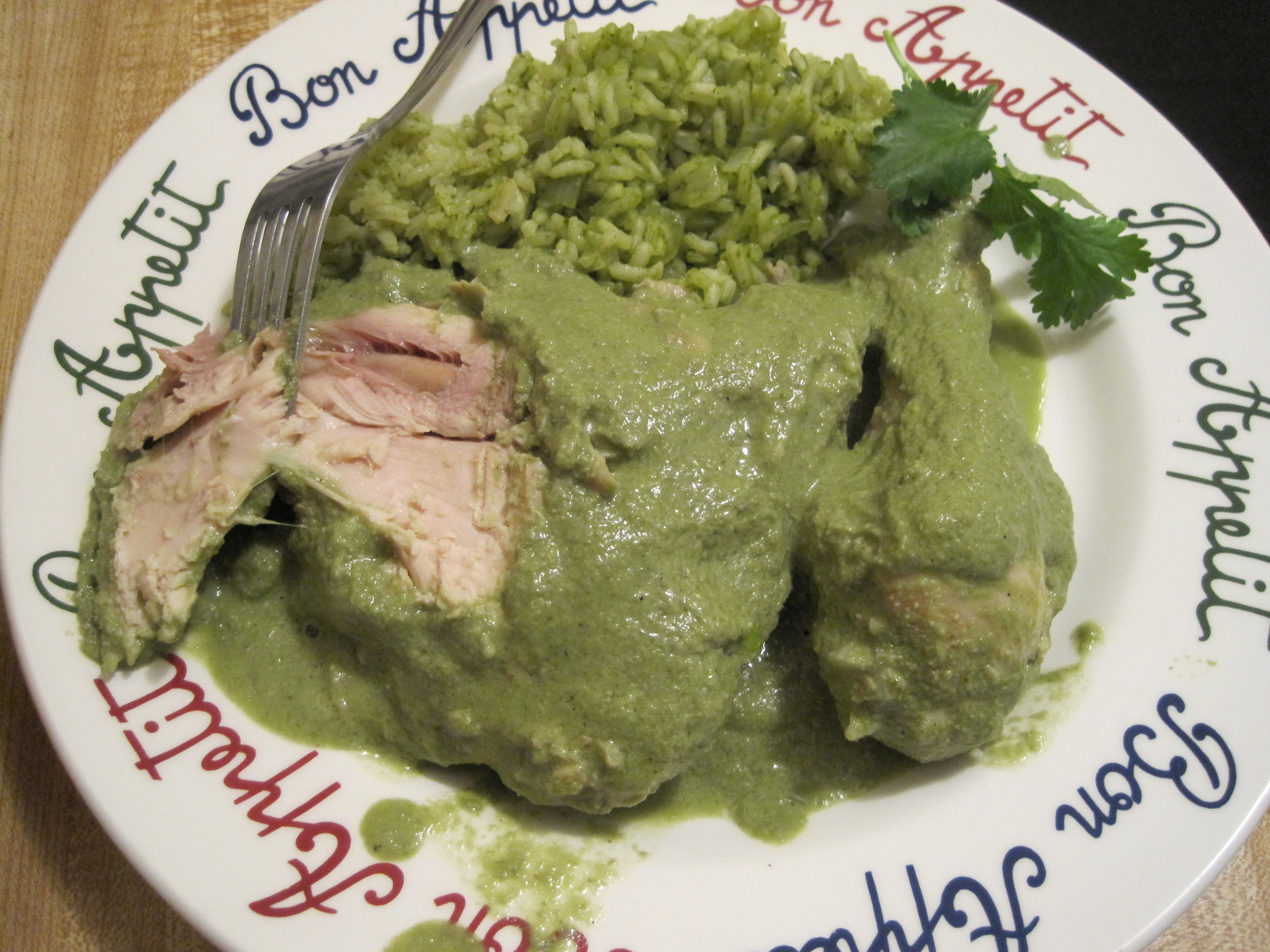

Arroz poblano (poblano rice) is a Mexican dish made with rice, in which its green color comes from a liquid preparation of poblano chili.

The green liquid is made by grinding roasted poblano chili with onion, cilantro, garlic, and water. White rice is fried in oil, then the liquid is added, along with yellow corn kernels, small strips of chili, and salt. The rice is simmered until tender.

== See also ==
- List of Mexican dishes
