= Pastel azteca =

Mexican dish

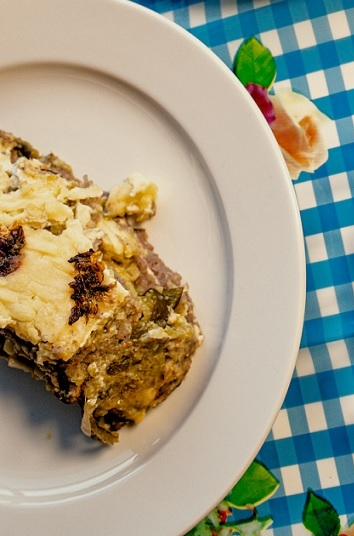
Pastel azteca

Pastel azteca is a traditional Mexican dish made with alternating layers of fried corn tortillas, tomato sauce, poblano pepper strips, corn kernels, onion strips, cream, and Oaxaca cheese or Chihuahua cheese.

It is common to add meat such as shredded chicken, ground beef, or pork. The dish is baked in an oven before serving.

Like a lasagna, a pastel azteca is a layering mix. There's an intense green tomatillo or red tomato sauce with the unique flavor of roasted poblano strips, finished with a creamy and cheesy top, with tortillas separating the layers. According to author Christopher Kimball, the only similarity of pastel Azteca with lasagha is the use of cheese.
