= Calabacitas con puerco =

Traditional Mexican dish

Calabacita con puerco is a traditional dish in Mexican cuisine. It consists of pork that is sauteed in butter, oil or in its own fat. Garlic, onion, black pepper, salt and chilis are added, and left on the fire until everything is cooked. Chopped red tomato, corn grains, bay leaf, cumin and black pepper are then added. All this is boiled until the meat is tender. Chopped pumpkin or zucchini is added until finally cooked. This dish is usually served with refried beans and red rice.
