= Arroz negro (Mexican cuisine) =

Dish involving rice dyed with bean broth

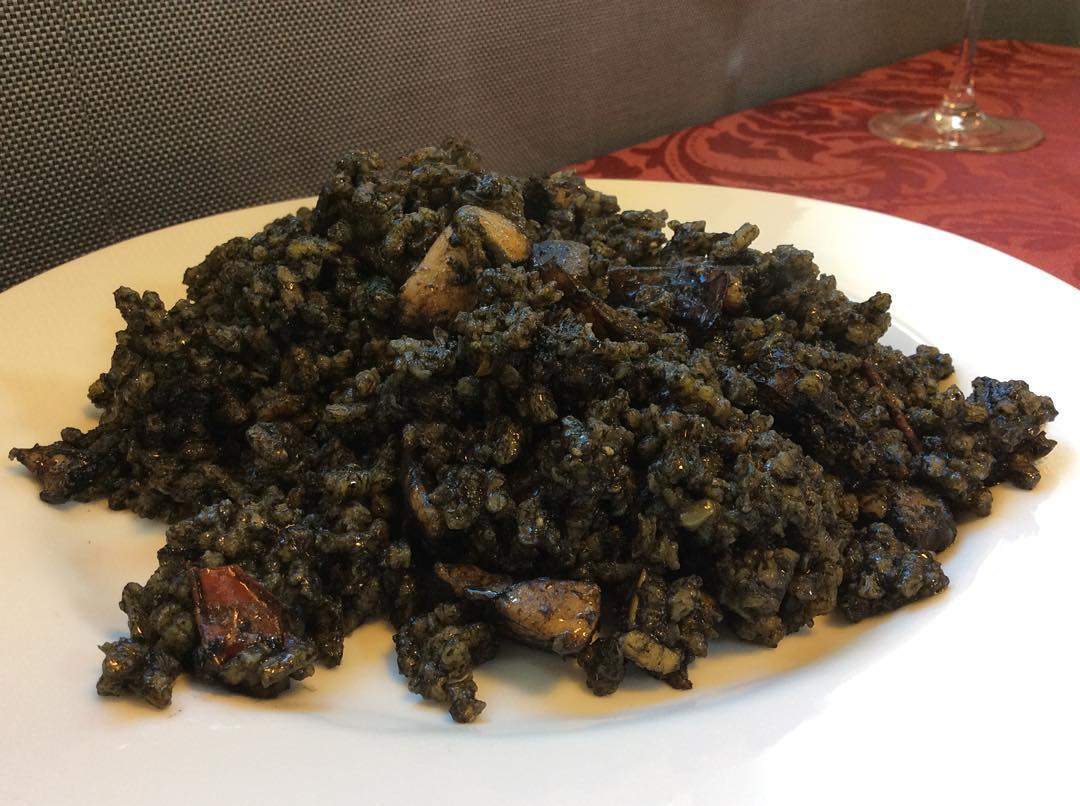
Arroz negro Place of origin: Oaxaca and Campeche, Mexico. Main ingredients: rice, black bean broth, onions, epazote, serrano, pepper and salt.

Arroz negro ("black rice") is a Mexican dish made with rice, in which its dark color comes from black bean broth. The dark broth is made by cooking black beans with onion and butter in sufficient water. Rice is fried with garlic, then the bean broth is added, as well as epazote, serrano pepper, and salt. The rice is simmered until tender.

It should not be confused with Black rice as a variety of rice, rather than a recipe, such as Indonesian black rice, Philippine balatinaw rice, and Thai jasmine black rice, these have natural color while the Mexican Arroz negro obtains this color from the black bean broth.

== Origins ==
The traditional recipe comes from southern regions as Oaxaca and Campeche. And every family prepares it in a different way, but the main ingredients for the arroz negro are rice, black bean broth, onion, epazote, serrano, pepper and salt.

== Related dishes ==
There are many other dishes related to arroz negro. They include risotto nero (Venice, Italy) and octopus with black rice and shrimp.

== See also ==
- List of Mexican dishes

== Sources ==
- Peña Vásquez, Cuauhtémoc. (2010). ¡Mucho gusto! Gastronomía y turismo cultural en el Istmo de Tehuantepec. Educal. ISBN 6074554889.
- Del Castillo, María. (1966). Cocina mexicana. Ed. Olimpo.
