= Puntas (Mexican dish) =

Spicy meat dish in Mexican cuisine

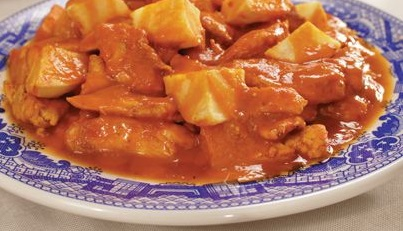
Puntas

Puntas are a traditional dish of Mexican cuisine. It consists of small cuts of meat cooked in various Mexican sauces, either of dried chili or fresh chilis sauces. Initially, the tips were made with strips of leftover beef cut, known as puntas de filete. Then, different types of meat have been used.

== Bibliography ==
- Muñoz Zurita, Ricardo. (2012). Diccionario Enciclopédico Larousse de la Gastronomía Mexicana. ISBN 9786072106192.

== See also ==
- Mexican cuisine
- Beef
