= Frijoles Puercos =

Mexican dish

Frijoles Puercos (pig beans) is a traditional Mexican dish. The dish is characterized by blended beans stewed with lard, chile pepper, chorizo, Chihuahua cheese Many variations are found in different regions across Mexico.
