= Jenni's Quesadillas =

Food stand in Mexico City

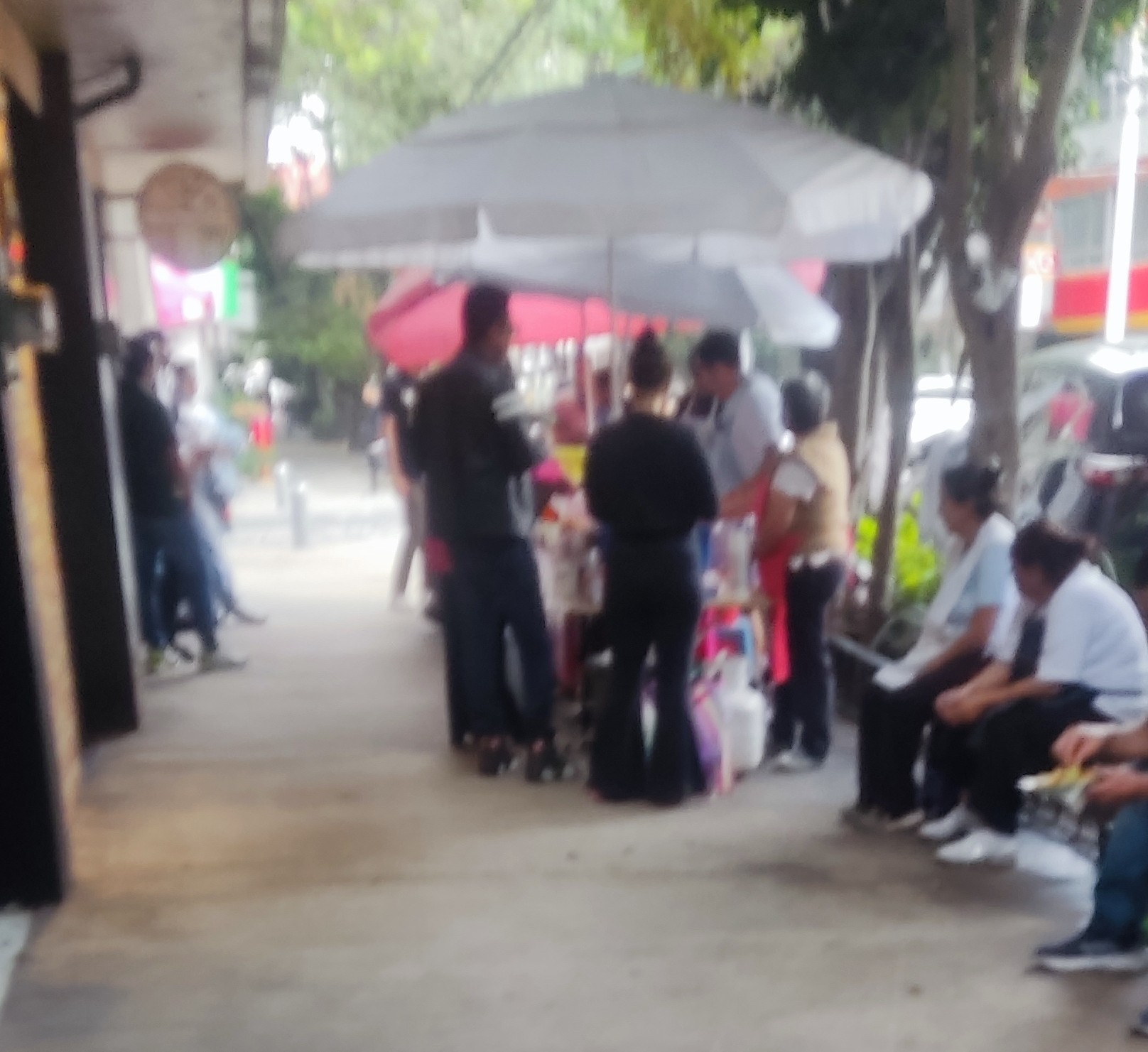
- The stand in 2025
- Interactive map of Jenni's Quesadillas

Restaurant information
- Established: c. 1970s
- Owner: Elena Rojas Vara
- Food type: Mexican (antojitos)
- Location: Mérida and Colima, Roma, Cuauhtémoc, Mexico City, 06700, Mexico
- Coordinates: 19°25′12.9″N 99°09′27.7″W

Jenni's Quesadillas, alternatively known as Quesadillas Elenita, is a Mexican antojito food stand in Colonia Roma, Cuauhtémoc, Mexico City.

Elena Rojas Vara opened the stand during the 1970s, at the intersection of Mérida and Colima Streets. Since then, the business has attracted local and foreign customers. Rojas is also assisted by Jenni, whose name was later associated with the stand.

== Description ==
The food stand serves antojitos—traditional Mexican street food—such as tlacoyos, quesadillas, tamales, gorditas and pambazos, as well as atole as a beverage. The dishes are made of maize—including blue corn—which the vendors hand-nixtamalize. The stand offers salsas, crema, cheese and nopals as accompaniments, with fillings that include squash blossom, requesón, huitlacoche, mushrooms, beef or chicken tinga, chicharrón, mole verde, picadillo, potatoes with chorizo, quelite and beans.

The food stand provides an English menu for foreign visitors—who are frequently seen there—complete with descriptions of each dish's ingredients. Despite the number of foreign visitors, the business only accepts Mexican pesos.

== History ==
Elena Rojas Vara (born 1950–51) is originally from Xalatlaco, State of Mexico, a municipality neighboring Mexico City. When she was a child, she learned to nixtamalize maize, and at the age of 16, she traveled to the city to sell tamales and atole along Avenida Cuauhtémoc. After finishing her workday, she would visit La Merced Market, where she befriended a woman who taught her to prepare antojitos, a type of Mexican street food. She taught her to prepare multiple dishes, like tinga, potatoes with chorizo, chicharrón, huitlacoche, mushrooms, and squash blossom. She advised Rojas to start by making tlacoyos to practice her skills. When Rojas was ready, the woman invited her to sell food beside her stand, but Rojas declined and instead began selling at the corner of Mérida and Puebla Streets in Colonia Roma.

Rojas got married, and invited her sister-in-law to work with her, but due to economic constraints they eventually separated. Rojas then moved to the corner of Mérida and Colima streets, where she set up the stand. The 1985 Mexico City earthquake disrupted her business, as it heavily affected the neighborhood. She later tried relocating to San Ángel, but was unable to settle there because of already-established vendors. After her husband left her with six children, she closed the stand and worked in a factory until the Roma neighborhood recovered.

The stand has remained in its current location ever since, despite the area's gentrification and the arrival of new restaurants and cafés. Over time, Rojas began employing assistants, including Jenni. When the stand closes, its equipment is stored in a nearby parking lot. Jenni, an employee rather than a relative of Rojas, became closely associated with the stand, and her name was later mistakenly added to Google Maps.

Due to the popularity of the food stand, it had to be relocated to the opposite corner due to neighbors' complaints.

== Reception ==
Scarlett Lindeman from Condé Nast Traveler mentioned how hard it is to resist wanting to order and eat more from the stand. She points out that while not all quesadillas come with cheese, customers are given the option to add it. While writing for Bon Appétit, she also described it as a healthy dining option in the city. Brant Cox, writing for The Infatuation, recommended that visitors stop by the stand when sampling street food.

Marco Torres, columnist of Chron.com, praised the quesadilla's tortilla, describing its flavor as "soft" and "earthy". Michael Snyder of The New York Times called the mole verde quesadilla an essential dish to try in the city. Natalia de la Rosa described it as an option for vegan diners.

== See also ==
- Street vendors in Mexico City
