= Tierra del Sol (restaurant) =

Oaxacan restaurant in Portland, Oregon, U.S.

Coordinates: 45°29′10″N 122°35′20″W

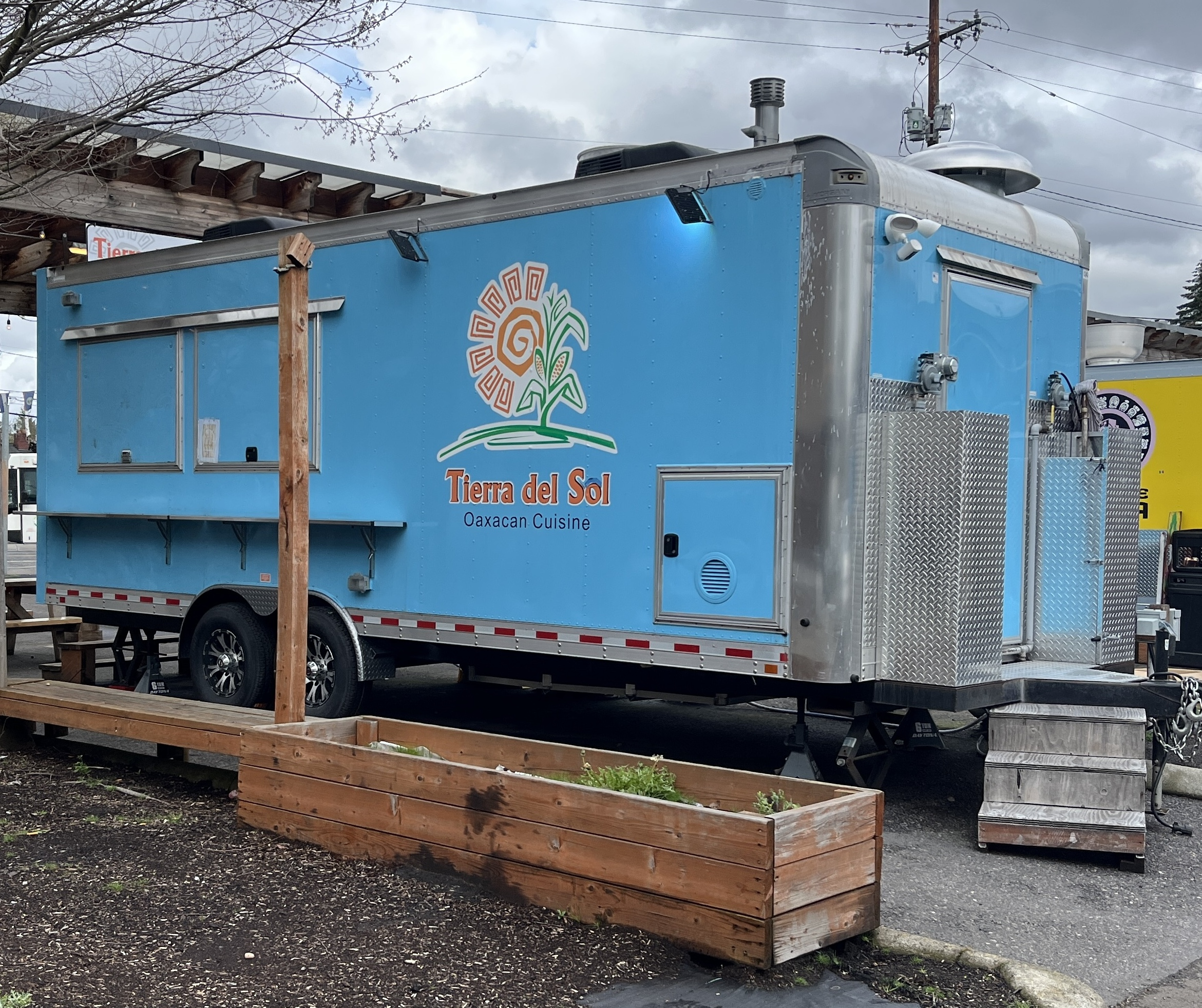
- The food cart at Portland Mercado, 2025
- Interactive map of Tierra del Sol

Restaurant information
- Established: 2015
- Owner: Amalia Sierra
- Chef: Amalia Sierra
- Food type: Oaxacan
- Location: 7238 Southeast Foster Rd #1; 6935 Northeast Glisan Street, Portland, Multnomah, Oregon, United States
- Website: tierradelsolpdx.com

Tierra del Sol is a Oaxacan restaurant with two locations in Portland, Oregon. Chef-owner Amalia Sierra began operating the business from a food cart at Portland Mercado in 2015. A second location opened in the Montavilla neighborhood in 2020.

== Description ==
Tierra del Sol serves Oaxacan cuisine from a food cart at Portland Mercado, located on Foster Road in the Mt. Scott-Arleta neighborhood. The menu has included enchiladas de amarillo, moles (including amarillo, coloradito, and pipián varieties), picaditas, tetelas, tacos, tlayudas, handmade tortillas, rice, and aguas frescas. Fillings include carnitas and chorizo.

The mole amarillo, described by Eater Portland's Brooke Jackson-Glidden as "mild but nuanced, thanks to the addition of hierba santa", has chayote, masa dumplings, and stewed chicken. The mole pipián is green and has jalapeños, pumpkin seeds, and tomatillos. Tierra del Sol uses seeds supplied by the chef's sister in Oaxaca.

The restaurant uses Portland-based Three Sisters Nixtamal for the blue corn tacos; meatless taco varieties include cactus, mushroom, and vegetable stew, with avocado, cilantro, onions, and pico de gallo as toppings. The tlayuda has avocado slices, a black bean spread, cabbage, cilantro, onion, queso Oaxaca, and queso fresco. Suzette Smith of the Portland Mercury said the tlayuda is "massive and comes in a pizza box, along with a suggestion to split it between two".

== History ==
Tierra del Sol's chef is Amalia Sierra, a former social worker who opened her first cart at the Portland Mercado in 2015. In 2020, a second location opened with a similar menu at Rocket Empire Machine, a food hall in the northeast Portland part of the Montavilla neighborhood. Sierra has also shared plans to operate a food cart at Brooklyn Carreta.

== Reception ==
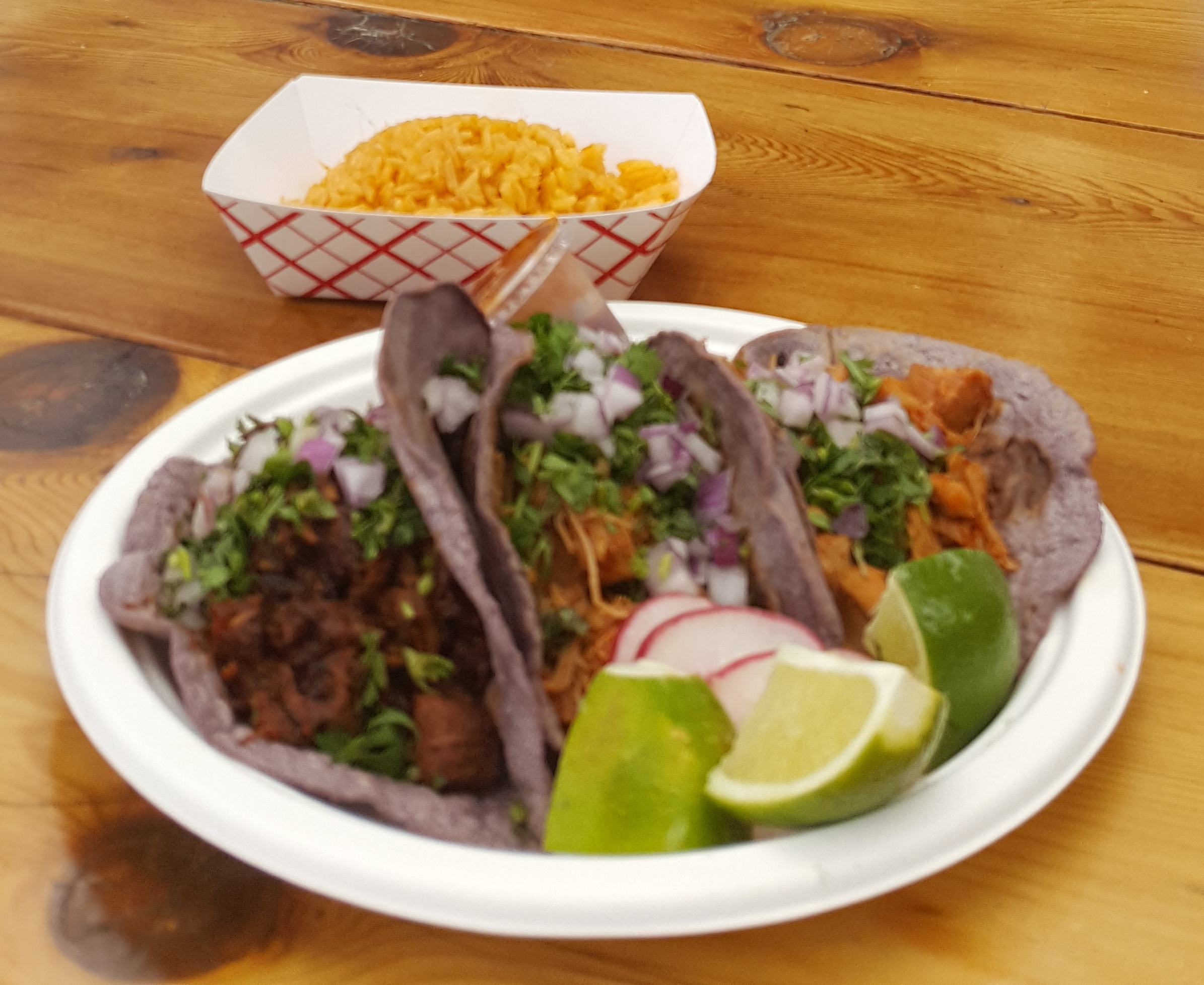
Tacos and a side of rice

In May 2020, during the COVID-19 pandemic, Jackson-Glidden included Tierra del Sol in Eater Portland's list of the 25 "essential" Portland restaurants offering delivery or take-out service. Waz Wu included the restaurant in the website's 2021 overview of "where to find tasty vegan tacos" in the city. In 2022, Jackson-Glidden included the mole amarillo in a list of 17 "sick day delivery standbys to order in Portland". She and Nick Woo also included Tierra del Sol in a guide to the city's "most outstanding" food carts, and Krista Garcia and Seiji Nanbu included the business in a list of Portland's 17 "standout" Mexican eateries. Garcia and Nanbu said the tlayuda made Tierra del Sol a "standout" over other food carts at Portland Mercado and wrote, "It might seem easy to skip the tetelas stuffed with creamy beans and rich Oaxacan moles, though it's not recommended". Nanbu and Nathan Williams included the restaurant in Eater Portland's 2022 list of 22 "outstanding taco spots" in the Portland metropolitan area. Tierra del Sol was also included in the website's 2025 overview of Portland's best food carts.

In 2018, Shannon Armour of Willamette Week called the tlayudas "excellent". In 2020, Suzette Smith of the Portland Mercury said of the tlayuda: "It's a beauty to look at and, in practice, sort of like super fresh nachos if there were only one massive chip underneath all the fixins. I loved it, but I should note that it's probably more of a summer dish. Plus, without a meat or veggie stew on top, the tlayuda came off a little dry."

== See also ==
- List of Mexican restaurants
