= Sope (food) =

Traditional Mexican dish

Sopes
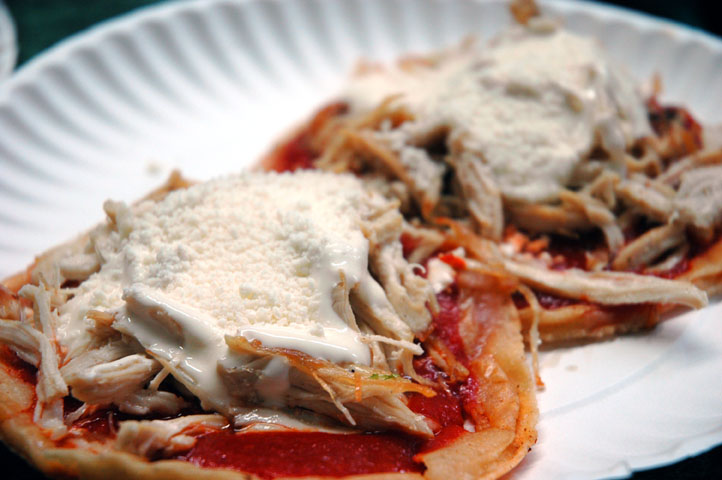
- Sopes with red salsa
- Alternative names: pellizcada, garnacha
- Type: antojito
- Place of origin: Mexico
- Main ingredients: corn dough, vegetables, meat, refried beans, cheese, lettuce, onions, red or green sauce (salsa)

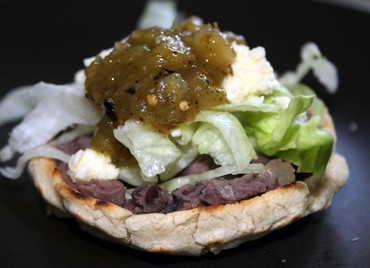
Sopes with green salsa

A sope (Spanish pronunciation: [ˈso.pe]) is a traditional Mexican dish consisting of a fried masa base with savory toppings. Also known as picadita (in Tierra Caliente, Guerrero), it originates in the central and southern parts of Mexico, where it was sometimes first known as pellizcadas. It is an antojito and looks like an unusually thick tortilla with vegetables and meat toppings.

The masa base is fried with pinched sides and topped with refried beans, crumbled cheese, lettuce, onions, red or green sauce and sour cream. Sometimes other ingredients (mostly meat) are also added to create different tastes and styles.

== Traditional sopes ==
The sope has spread throughout all Mexico's territory, and thousands of regional variants are made. Even though sopes are traditionally from Mexico, many Central American countries have adopted this dish into their cuisine, with slightly different ingredients, and very similar to Salvadoran enchiladas.

While the pinched sides of the sope are its most distinctive characteristic, flat sopes are made to resemble a thick tortilla or a tostada. However, though both tostadas and sopes are fried, the tostada is thin and fried until it becomes crunchy and fragile, while the sope is much thicker and fried only until the exterior surface is cooked. The sope, therefore, has a soft, slightly pliable texture. The sope's thickness is meant to support its toppings, and the frying of its exterior surface adds resistance to the moisture of the ingredients.

The most common variation of the sope involves simply adding chicken and is widely known as a sope de pollo. Sopes topped with beef are also a common variation and are typically slightly larger than sopes de pollo.

In the northern regions of Mexico, sopes are often prepared without vegetables, substituting black beans, spicy salsa, and longaniza or chorizo instead. In Acapulco and Guerrero, sopes are unusually small in size, so they are called sopecitos instead, and are fried in the same oil used to fry seafood, which gives them a unique taste. Sopecitos are made of beans and salsa only; no other ingredients are added.

In Oaxaca, sopes sometimes are prepared using chapulines (roasted grasshoppers) as topping. Also, an extremely large dish similar to a giant sope or a giant tostada is the traditional food of reference in Oaxaca known as tlayuda.

== Similar dishes ==
The sope has been adopted and adapted to the local tastes of all Mexico's regions. This resulted in the creation of many traditional food specialties, which may appear to resemble the sope, but are considered a different dish.

=== Huarache ===
The most common variation is the huarache, which is prepared in almost the same manner. However, the huarache normally is two or three times as large as a sope and has a characteristic oblong shape. Huaraches are usually topped with rib, chicken, or beefsteak meat. The name huarache is derived from the shape of the masa, similar to the popular sandals. Toppings for the huarache include beans, cheese, lettuce, sour cream, ground beef, and salsa.

=== Tlacoyo ===
The tlacoyo is a completely different traditional Mexican dish which must not be confused with a sope, but in some regions has started to be used in a similar way, as a base on top of which are placed the same ingredients used for sopes. A tlacoyo is an oval fried or toasted cake made of masa, torpedo-shaped and much fatter, since it is filled with beans or cheese.

Since it is similar in shape to a huarache (but smaller), and is made of the same corn as the sope and is even thicker (so it has more resistance to humid foods), Mexican street vendors decided to sell it adding toppings on it, as an alternative to the sope. However, the traditional tlacoyo is supposed to be consumed without any toppings on it, and this form is mostly found as street food.

=== Garnacha ===
Garnachas are small corn tortillas fried with shredded meat, crumbled dried cheese, and salsa. In many instances, garnachas may only have chopped onion and salsa on top. Similar in appearance to sopes, they are a main specialty from Guatemala.

=== Memela ===
Oaxacan memelas are a local name for the identical sopes served in other parts of Mexico, just made with different toppings. Memelas are corn masa cakes topped with beans, salsa, shredded cabbage, mole negro, guacamole, and cheese. Memelas have been served at Oaxacan/Mexican restaurants in the United States since the 1990s. In Puebla, they are often served by topping the fried masa with sauce—red sauce on one side and green sauce on the other side, called estilo bandera. Instead of meat, memelas in Puebla are served with sour cream, crumbled cheese, and diced onions on top of the red and green sauces.

=== Chalupa ===
A chalupa is a tostada platter in Mexican cuisine, not a sope, but its preparation method is quite similar. It is a specialty of south-central Mexico, such as the states of Puebla, Guerrero, and Oaxaca. It is made by pressing a thin layer of masa dough around the outside of a small mold and deep frying to produce a crisp, shallow corn cup. It is filled with various ingredients such as shredded chicken, pork, chopped onion, chipotle pepper, red salsa, and green salsa.

The chalupa is usually longer than a sope, resembling the canoe-like boat that is its namesake, although small versions (named chalupitas) are available in other regions. An Americanized form is sold in Taco Bell restaurants, filled with ground meat, steak, or chicken, and topped with cheese, lettuce, sour cream, and salsa, resembling an American taco inside, but wrapped with deep-fried wheat flatbread.

=== Salbutes and panuchos ===
Yucatecan food is very different from what is traditionally referred to as "Mexican" food, as the cuisine from this region, primarily Belize, includes the local Mayan culture combined with an unusual (for the rest of the country) European cuisine influence.

Salbutes are similar to sopes but are thinner, coloured and flavoured with recado rojo (achiote), and fried until crispy. Fillings may include beans, tomato, lettuce, avocado, or a meat, topped with a salsa. The word salbute comes from Yucatec Maya sáal meaning "light", and buut meaning "stuffed".

Panuchos feature tortillas partially fried as a sope base, but filled with black beans and topped with turkey or chicken, lettuce, avocado, and pickled onions. Habanero chiles accompany most dishes, either in solid or puréed form, along with fresh limes or lime juice.

== See also ==
- List of Mexican dishes
