= Piedras Encimadas Valley =

Coordinates: 20°2′28.09″N 98°1′34.09″W

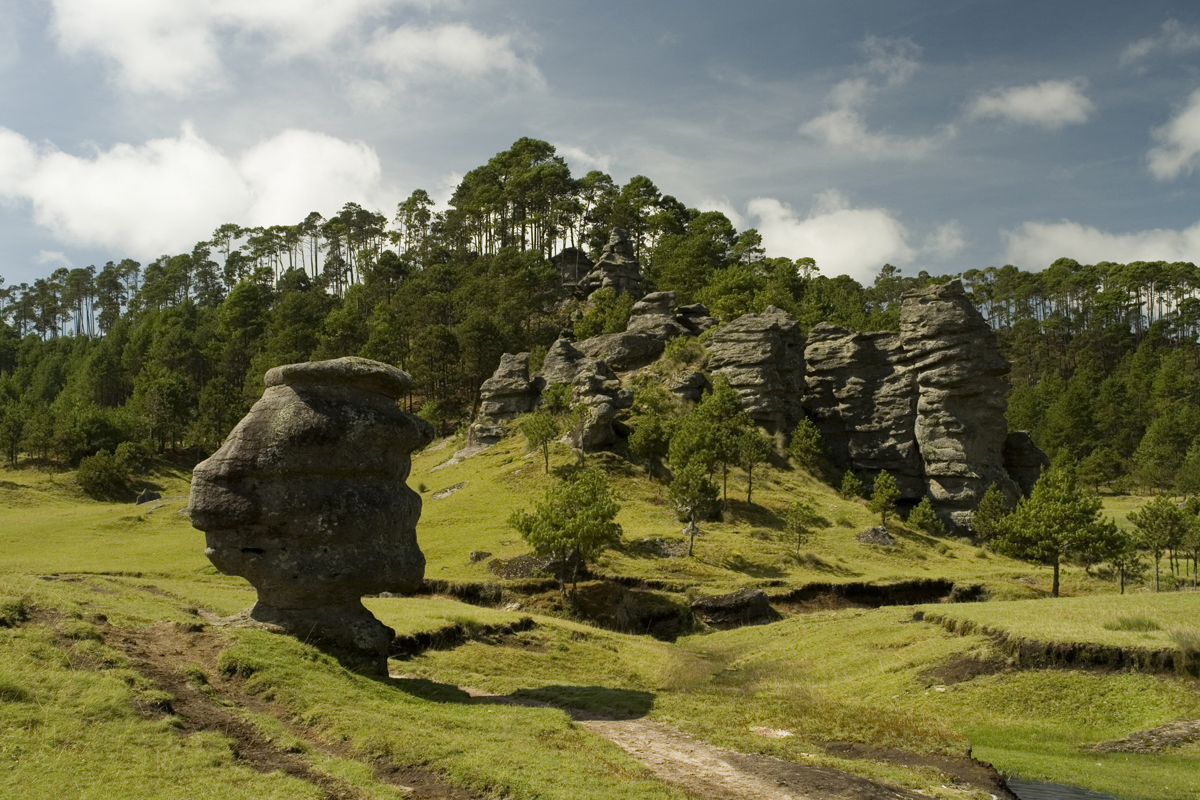
One of the rock formations in Piedras Encimadas

The Piedras Encimadas Valley (Stacked Stones in English) is a series of small valleys and tourist attraction located in the Zacatlán municipality of Puebla in central Mexico. The main feature of the zone is basalt rock formations in capricious forms, created by erosion over millions of years. The valley has been defined as covering anywhere from 100 to 400 hectares, most of which is privately owned land developed for tourism.

== Location and extension ==
The Valley is located mostly in the Zacatlán municipality in a region of Puebla known as the Sierra Norte de Puebla. However, the city of Zacatlán is about thirty km away, with the closest communities being Camotepec, Teopancingo, Las Lajas, Rancho Nuevo, San Miguel Tenango and Metlaxixtla. Camotepec is on the road that leads to the main entrance of the tourist area and consists only of a few houses, a church and a school. While it has been called such, it is not officially a national park. Its boundaries are not clear with the Valley described as having anywhere from 100 to 400 hectares. It is private land that extends over 300 hectares owned by a group of thirty partners.

== Geography ==
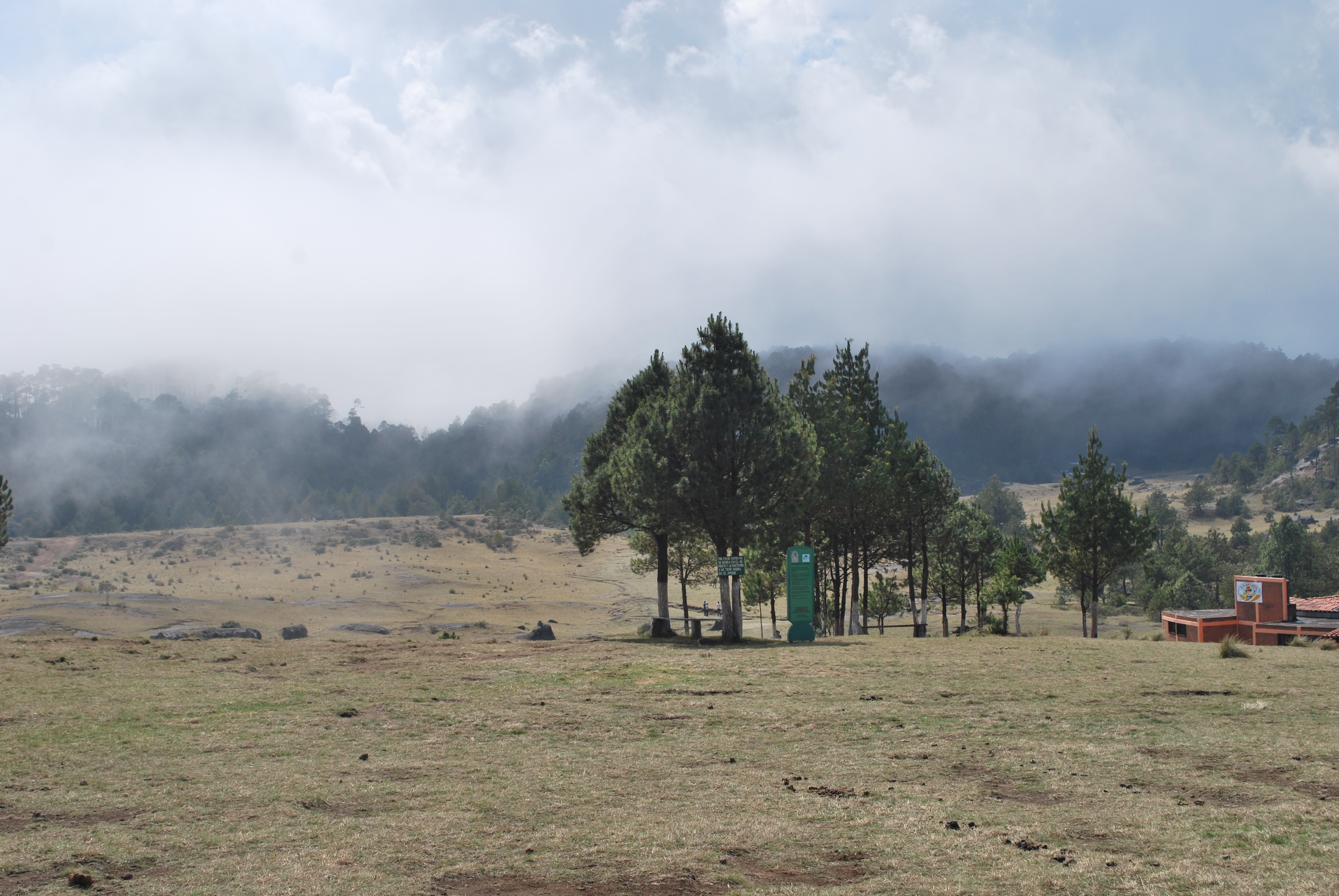
View of the area near the entrance with fog

The Valley is really a group a various small valleys over an area of four km2 in a pine forest at an altitude of about 2,400 meters above sea level. Surrounding these small valleys are larger mountains. Much of the area is covered in forest of pine and other species, which has been conserved because the rocky nature of the land makes it difficult to cultivate.

The area is cool and damp year round with fog almost every day. The area receives moisture from the Gulf of Mexico. Fog occurs nearly every day in the morning and can be extremely thick and lasting much of the day, with the rainiest months July and August. The driest months are April and May. Nights can be cold enough in winter for frost. Because of the forest and rock formations of the area, it has been featured in television commercials, especially those for beer and cars.

== Rock formations ==
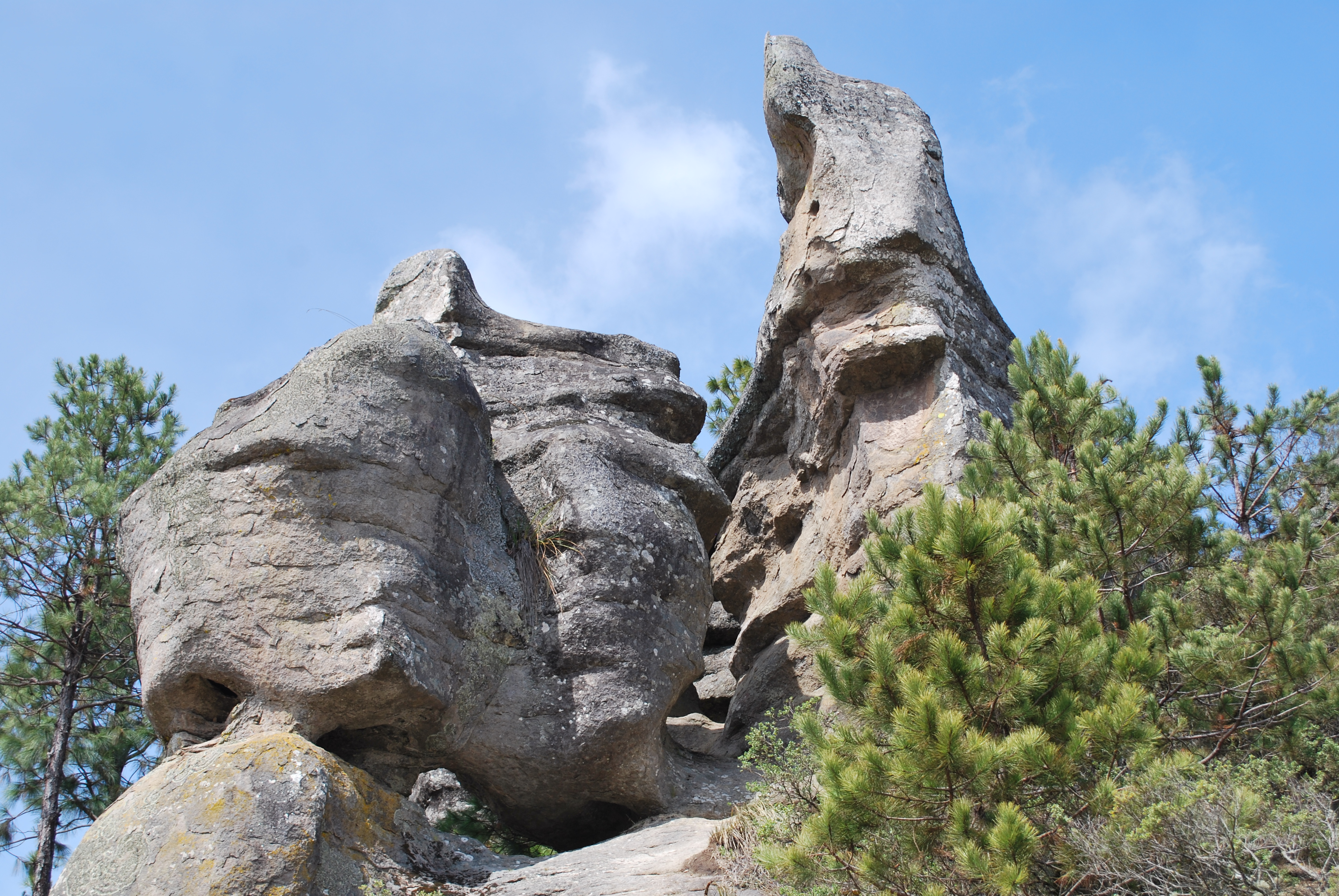
One of the many rock formations

There are hundreds of formations on the property of many sizes. About 240 of the formation have been cataloged, but locals say there are many more. The formations have been compared to buildings, columns, dragons, various animals and human faces with dozens of the formation between ten and twenty meters tall. There are various stories related to their formation. One says that they were made by giants, another states that the rock formations were giants which were punished by being turned to stone. Other stories say that the area was once under the sea or that extra terrestrials made them. The rock formations have their origin during the Cenozoic era about 66 million years ago with volcanic activity. Since that time the rock has worn away due to wind, rain and other factors to leave what is seen here.

The formation are spread out among the vegetation and on the hillsides. There is a small stream that crosses the area, which runs most in the rainy season. There are also open areas with grass, where it is common to find shepherds with sheep and goats.

== Tourism ==
There are cabins with basic services, restaurants, horse rental and camping. On weekends there are vendors selling snacks and sweets. The camping area is called Dragon Valley due to its largest rock formation. The road to the main entrance has a number of food stand serving pulque, quesadillas and tlacoyos. Maintenance of the site include cleaning, reforestation and control of logging. Most visitors are from Mexico but some from abroad with the busiest time being the Holy Week vacation period. It does not receive as many visitors as it might because of its distance from major urban centers (180 km from Mexico City and 170 km from Puebla) and the poor quality of the roads in the Sierra Norte zone.
