= Tetela =

Tetela may refer to:

Democratic Republic of the Congo:

- Tetela people
- Tetela language

Mexico:

- Tetela, with similar ingredients as a Memela, is a pre-Hispanic, Mixtec, comal-griddled triangular-folded masa pocket, filled with ingredients, eaten in the states of Guerrero, Oaxaca and Puebla, similar to corn tortillas, sope and huarache, but with different fillings.
- Tetela del Volcán, Morelos
- Tetela, Oaxaca
- Los Ángeles Tetela, Puebla
- San Baltazar Tetela, Puebla
- Tetela de Ocampo, Puebla
- Tetela de Xonotla, Puebla
