= Memela =

Masa cake in Mexican cuisine

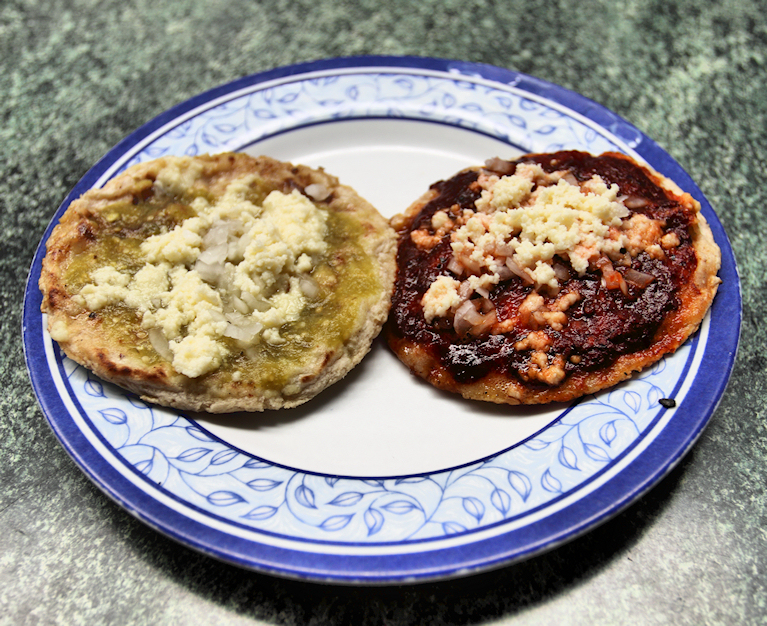
- Memelas topped with green and red salsa with queso fresco
- Type: Pancake
- Course: Antojito
- Place of origin: Mexico
- Region or state: Puebla
- Main ingredients: Masa

Memelas, also known as memelitas, are fried or toasted cakes made of masa topped with different fresh ingredients eaten as antojitos or snacks in the states of Guerrero, Oaxaca, Tlaxcala, and Puebla, Mexico, which have their origins in prehispanic food. They are similar to fresh corn tortilla, but are slightly thicker and usually shaped in an oblong oval. Memela is the local name for the almost identical sope and huarache served in other parts of Mexico, but with different toppings.

The corn masa is flattened with a tortilla press, pinched to create indentations along its borders, then placed over a hot comal or griddle. When the tortilla-like base is cooked and charred where the dough hits the hot metal of the grill and becomes as chewy as a medium-well steak, it is topped with black beans, salsa, peppers, shredded cabbage, mole negro, guacamole, and cheese.

Although the traditional memela is supposed to be topped with no other ingredients, those toppings now vary. Modern incarnations include other vegetables and the option of a layer of tinga (shredded chicken with tomatoes, onions, and chiles) or potatoes and sausage.

Memelas have been served at Oaxacan Mexican restaurants in the United States since the 1990s.

In the Netflix Street Food series, memelas were prominently featured for locals and tourists.

== Other varieties ==
In El Salvador, a memela is a thick and oval shaped tortilla.

In Honduras and Guatemala, a memela is a toasted cake made of masa mixed with cinnamon and curdle, cooked in banana leaves.

== See also ==
- Tlayuda
- List of Mexican dishes
