= Portland Mercado =

Food cart pod in Portland, Oregon, U.S.

- Portland Mercado's logo
- Location: Portland, Oregon, U.S.
- Location within Portland, Oregon
- Coordinates: 45°29′10.0″N 122°35′19.9″W
- Website: portlandmercado.org

Portland Mercado is a collection of food carts (or a "pod") in Portland, Oregon, United States. The carts are located in Southeast Portland's Mt. Scott-Arleta neighborhood, at the border of Foster-Powell.

== Description and history ==
The food cart "pod" opened in 2015 and focuses on Latin American cuisine, community and culture. It has been described as Portland's first Latino public market. The pod is managed by Hacienda CDC.

In 2024, a two-alarm fire damaged the central building and temporarily stopped power and water service for the carts. Hacienda CDC created the Portland Mercado Fire Relief Fund to support the businesses impacted by the fire. The food pod re-opened approximately three weeks later.

=== Tenants ===
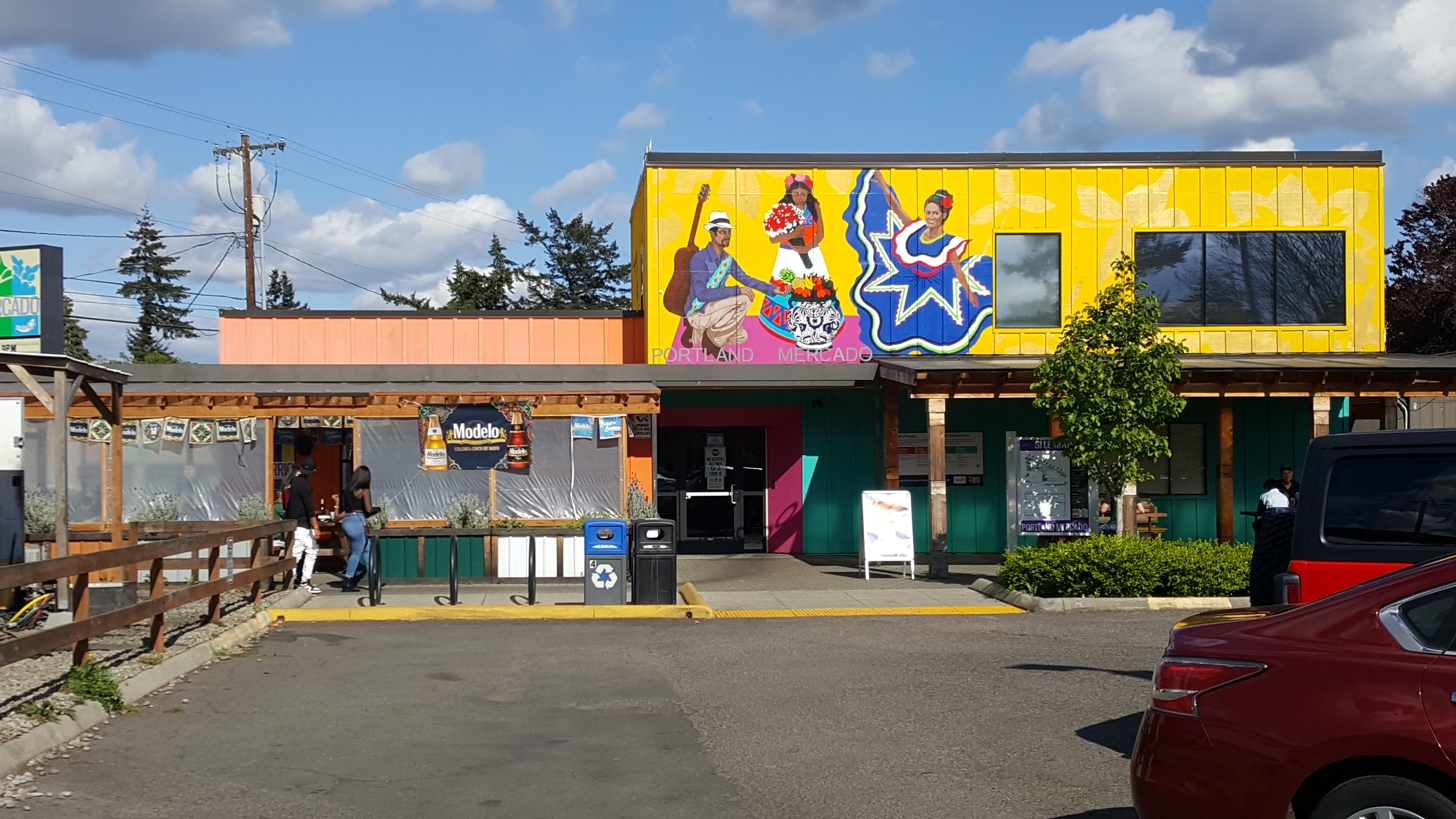
Portland Mercado in 2021

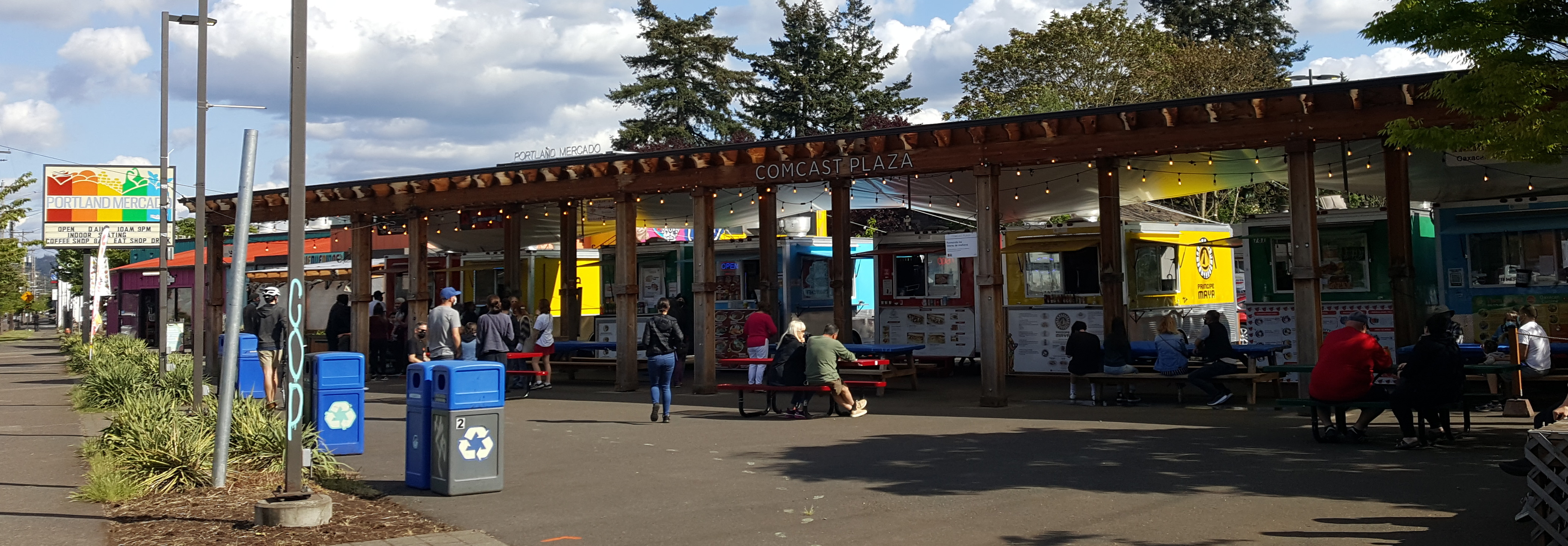
Food carts in 2021

Tenants have included:

- Alecocina
- Barrio
- Don Churro
- El Coquí
- Fernando's Alegría
- Havana Station
- Kaah Market
- La Arepa
- Mixteca Catering
- Principe Maya
- Que Bacano
- Tierra del Sol
- Tita's Kitchen
- Xŏcotl

Michael Russell included Barrio in The Oregonian's list of the 21 "most painful" restaurant and bar closures of 2024.

== See also ==
- Hispanics and Latinos in Portland, Oregon
