= Tasajo =

Cut of dried meat

Tasajo is the Spanish language word for jerky.

== Tasajo in Spain ==
In the Toledo region, tasajo consists of marinated deer loin that is smoked over a slow fire of holm oak wood, typical of hunting regions.

In the region of La Vera (in the province of Cáceres), and in the neighboring town of Candeleda (in Ávila province), it consists of marinated goat meat that has been macerated and dried. It is usually served as an appetizer in the bars of the area, and it is a good accompaniment with pitarra wine.

== Tasajo in Mexico ==
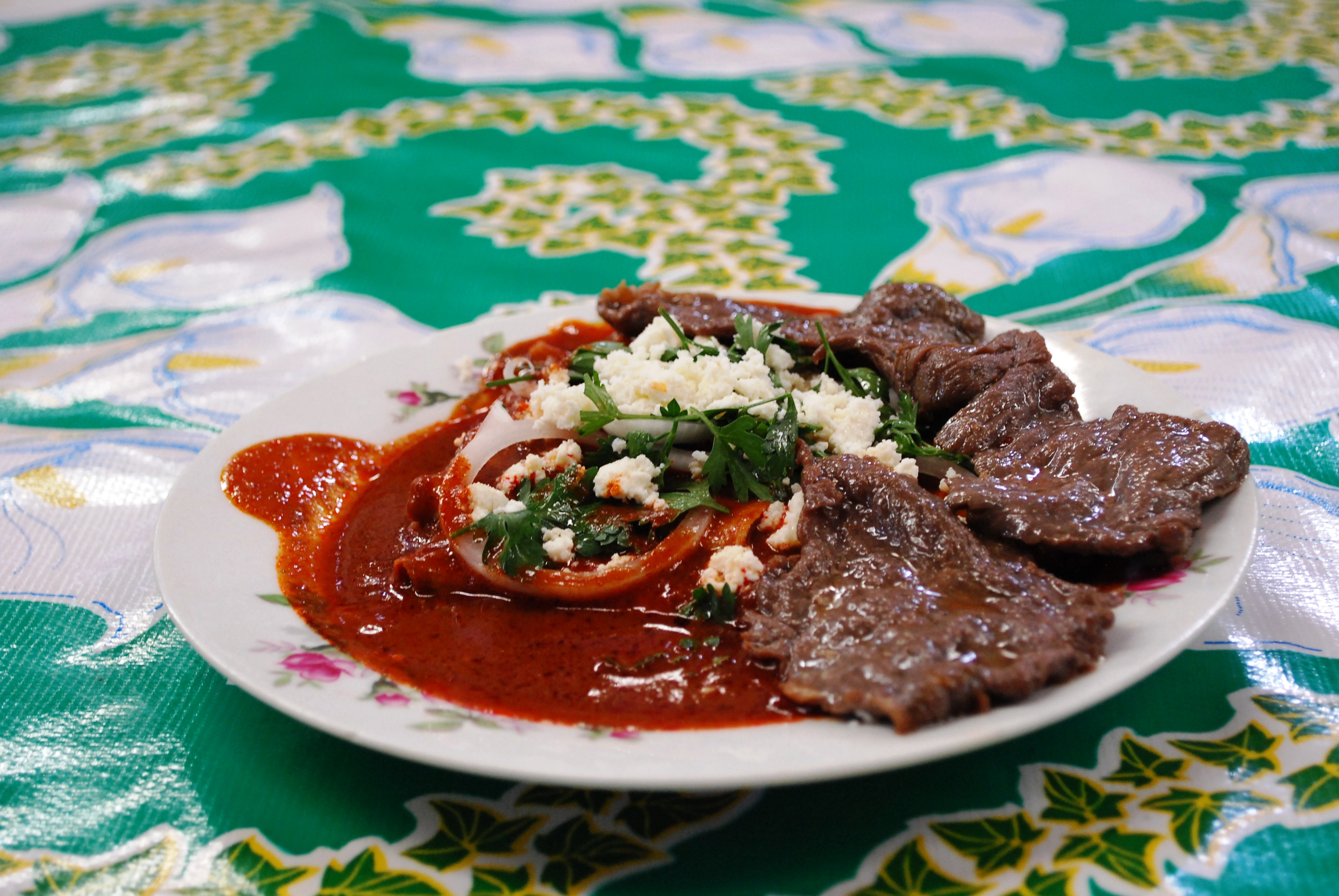
Enchiladas with tasajo

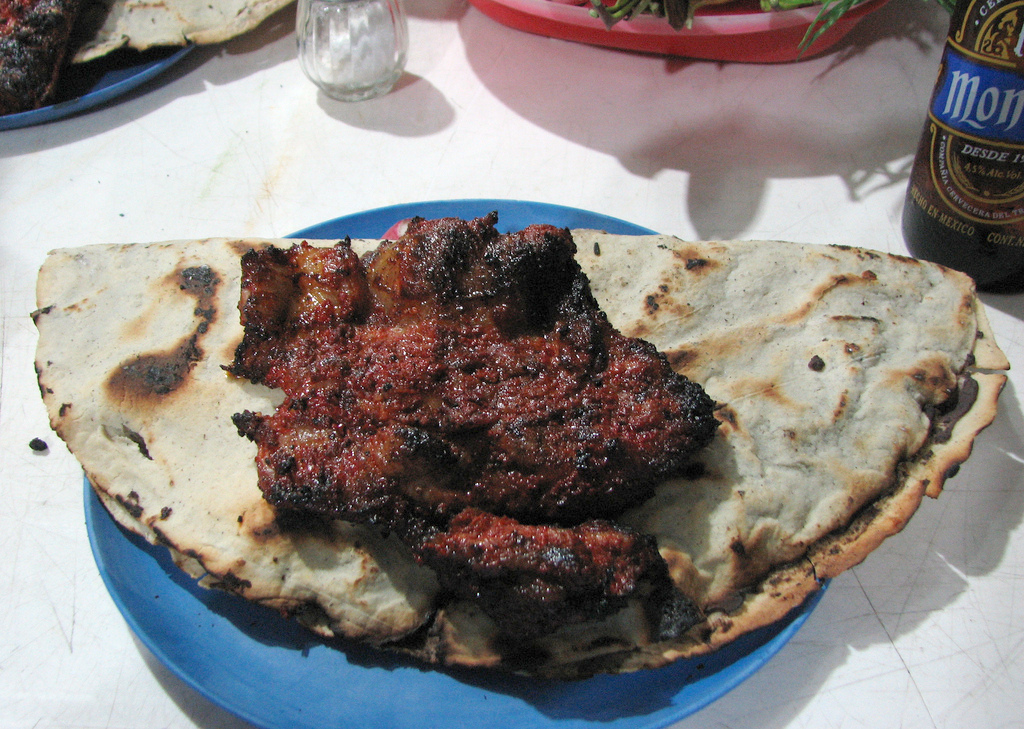
Tlayuda con falda, a tlayuda folded in half and topped with grilled skirt steak

In Mexican cuisine, tasajo is a cut of beef, typically from the states of Oaxaca and Chiapas. It is similar to pork jerky and is often made with organ meat including that of the head and back, but also can be made with flank or skirt steak.

In the historic quarter of the city of Oaxaca, it is customary to eat tasajo with tlayudas and radishes, as well as with "chiles de agua" and onions. It can also be accompanied with chapulines, quesillo and any other Oaxacan dish.

== Tasajo in Panama ==
In Panama (see Panamanian cuisine), tasajo is a cut of wood smoked beef which is later roasted or fried. It is consumed accompanied by fried food at breakfast or with rice and side dishes at lunch. It is popular in all of the provinces.

== Tasajo in Cuba ==
In Cuba (see Cuban cuisine), jerked beef is most often made from the meat of horses, donkeys, mules, or deer but is prepared similarly to how beef tasajo is prepared. Traditionally until the 1930s, tasajo in Cuba was most often made from horse meat, however, beef tasajo has been a more popular version since then.

== Tasajo in other countries ==
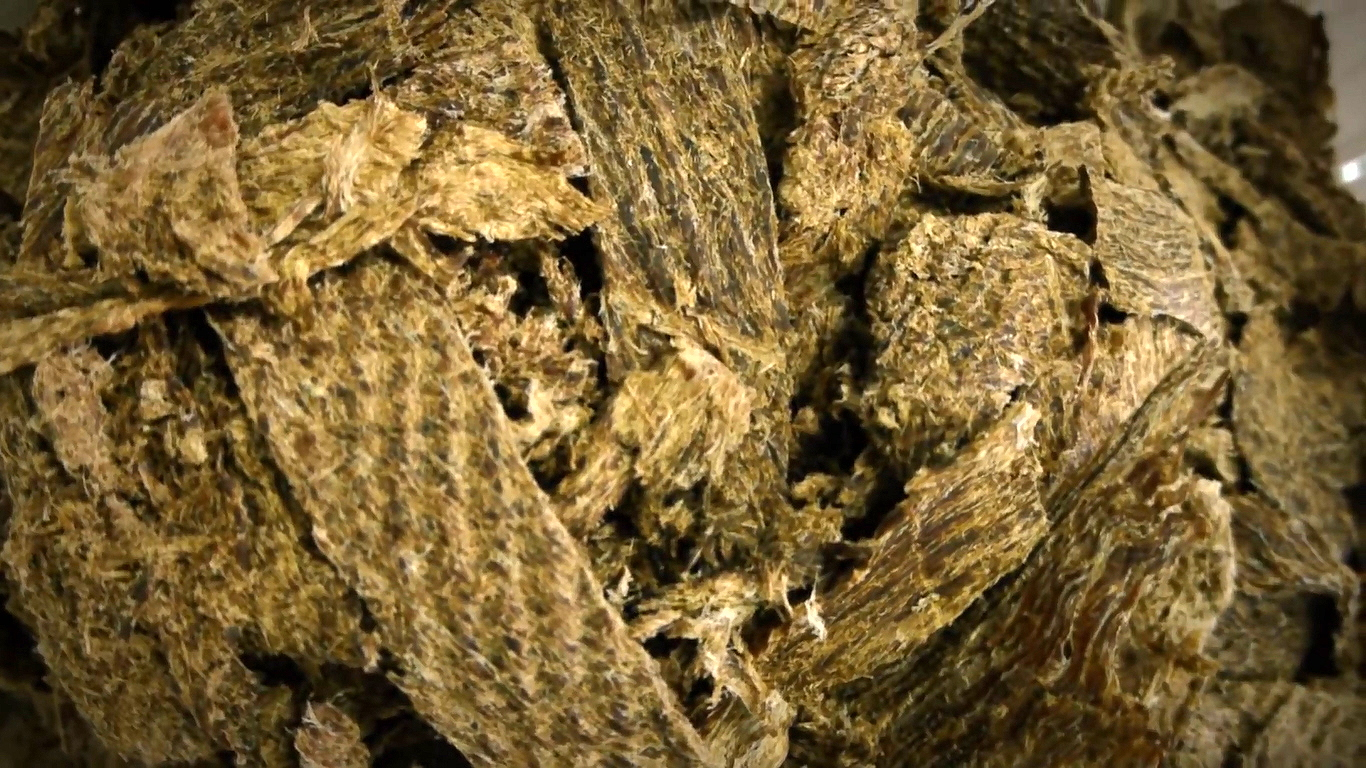
Ch'arki

In the Andean countries, Argentina, Brazil and Uruguay, tasajo goes by the name of "Charqui" or "Ch'arki" and consists of dehydrated beef, salted and smoked. Its texture resembles cardboard and was a part of the diet that was provided to enslaved people of African origin until the end of the 19th century in the Antilles and Brazil. The dish is normally prepared by first washing and then rehydrating the dried meat by boiling.

In Venezuela pieces of salted meat are called tasajo or sala.

== See also ==
- Jerky
- Biltong
