= Pambazo =

Mexican traditional dish

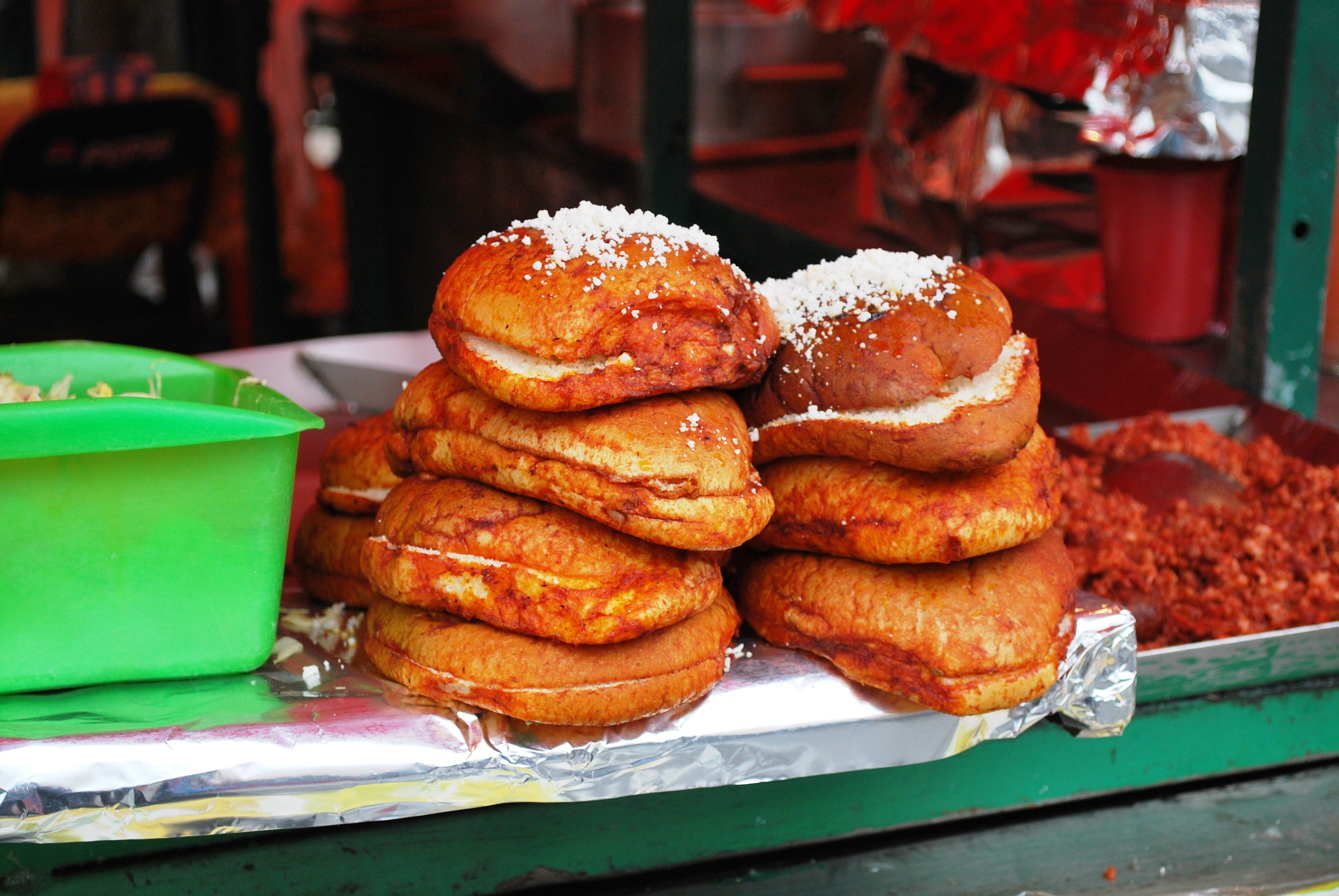
- Pambazos for sale in Mexico City
- Type: Pambazo bread
- Place of origin: Mexico
- Region or state: México City

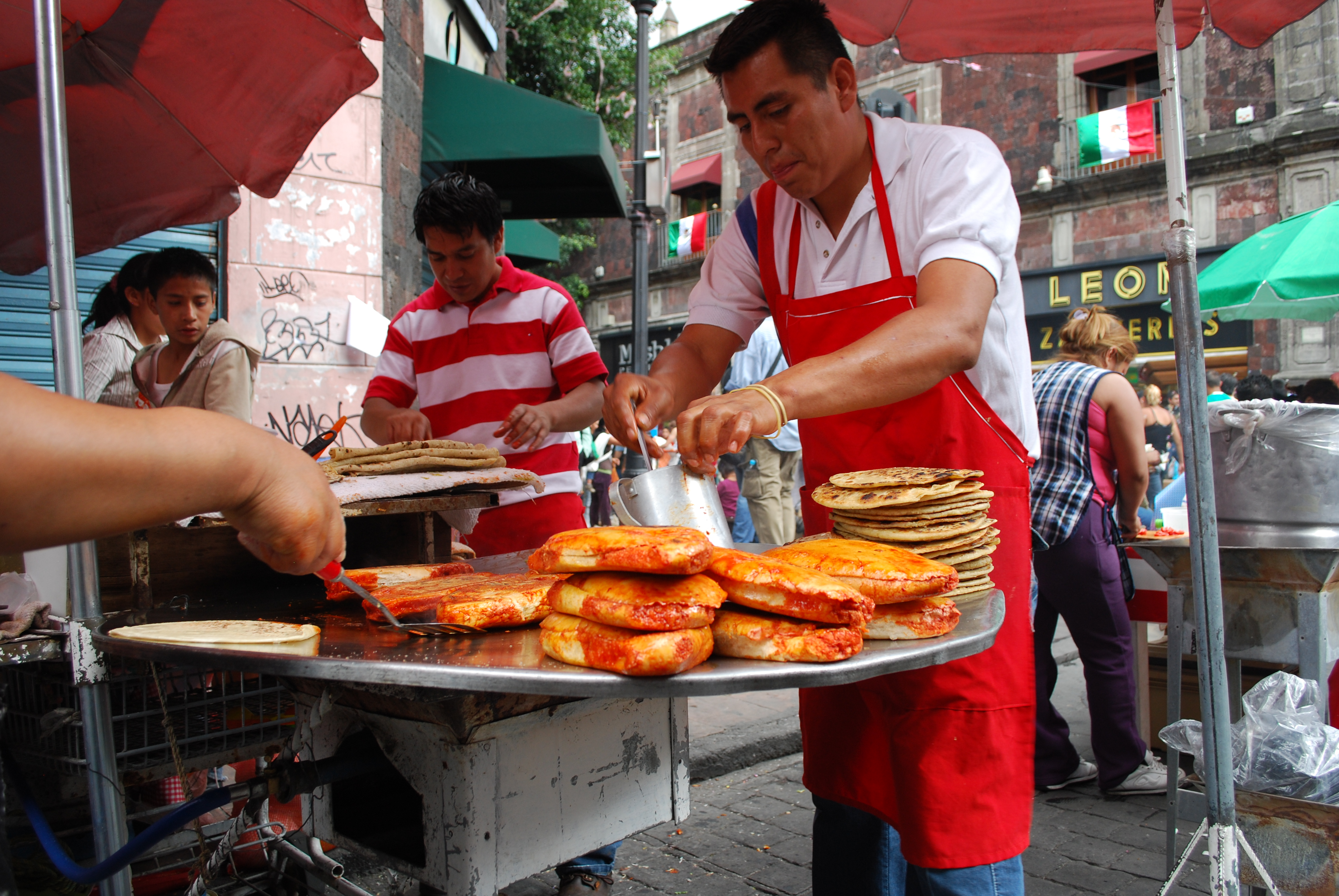
Pambazos being prepared in Mexico City (2010)

Pambazo (Spanish: [pamˈbaso]) is a Mexican dish or antojito (very similar to the torta) made with pambazo bread dipped and fried in a red guajillo pepper sauce. It is traditionally filled with papas con chorizo (potatoes with chorizo) or with potatoes only but there are different varieties.

== Ingredients and preparation ==
Pambazos are made from white bread without a crispy crust.

The bread is filled with potato and chorizo, dipped in warm red guajillo pepper sauce, fried, and garnished with shredded lettuce, salsa (sauce), crema (cream), and queso fresco (fresh cheese).

In the Mexican state of Veracruz at social events, small pambazos, called pambacitos ("little pambazos"), are served instead of canapés.

== History ==
The pambazo bread got its name from the Ladino word pan basso (Spanish pan bajo) or low-class bread from Mexico's viceregal period. During that period, there were bakeries in Mexico dedicated solely to this type of bread named 'panbasserias' (pambacerías).

"On this type of bread, inferior quality flour or flour from deteriorated wheat were mixed to produce the pan basso. Bakeries produced minimal quantities of pan basso, a maximum of 4% of all flour in Mexico City"

Virginia García Acosta, Las panaderías, sus dueños y trabajadores. Ciudad de México. Siglo XVII.

== Varieties ==
=== State of Mexico ===
In some villages from State of Mexico, the pambazos are made with Semitic Mediterranean cuisine influence by the use the acemite or bran for bread made in artisan bakeries about horns of Spanish colonial period, as the case of Malinalco, Tequixquiac and Amecameca.

In Malinalco, state of Mexico makes other pambazos, a Spanish colonial meal are made flour more small to Mexico City pambazos, filled with sausage and potatoes, chicken meat with epazote, shredded lettuce, white cheese, cream and spicy salsa.

In the Mexican state of Tequixquiac, pambazos are very different from those of Mexico City, being made with flour with dark wheat rind or bran named acemite, filled with sausage and potatoes, turkey meat or lamb meat (barbacoa), shredded lettuce, white cheese, cream and spicy chili chipotle sauce, fried with butter. The name is registered in this place as pan bazo, an archaic Spanish word.

=== State of Puebla ===
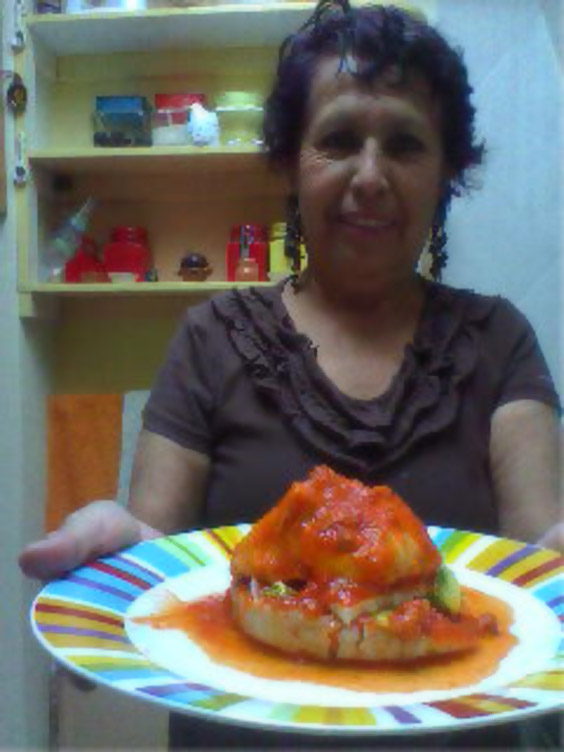
Pambazos of Puebla City

In Puebla City, pambazos are made with flour named cemita or acemite, sausages, potatoes, avocado, papalo, white cheese, and cream.

=== State of Veracruz ===
Orizaba, Veracruz, a place with Sephardic roots, pambazo is made with Carne Polaca, or "Polish meat", lettuce, and spicy sauce.

== Reception ==
The Daily Meal reviewed the pambazo with "it’s insanely delicious" in their article "12 Life-Changing Sandwiches You've Never Heard Of". Robert Sietsema described the sandwich as legendary in The Village Voice.

== See also ==
- Torta ahogada
- List of Mexican dishes
