= Huarache (food) =

Mexican maize dish

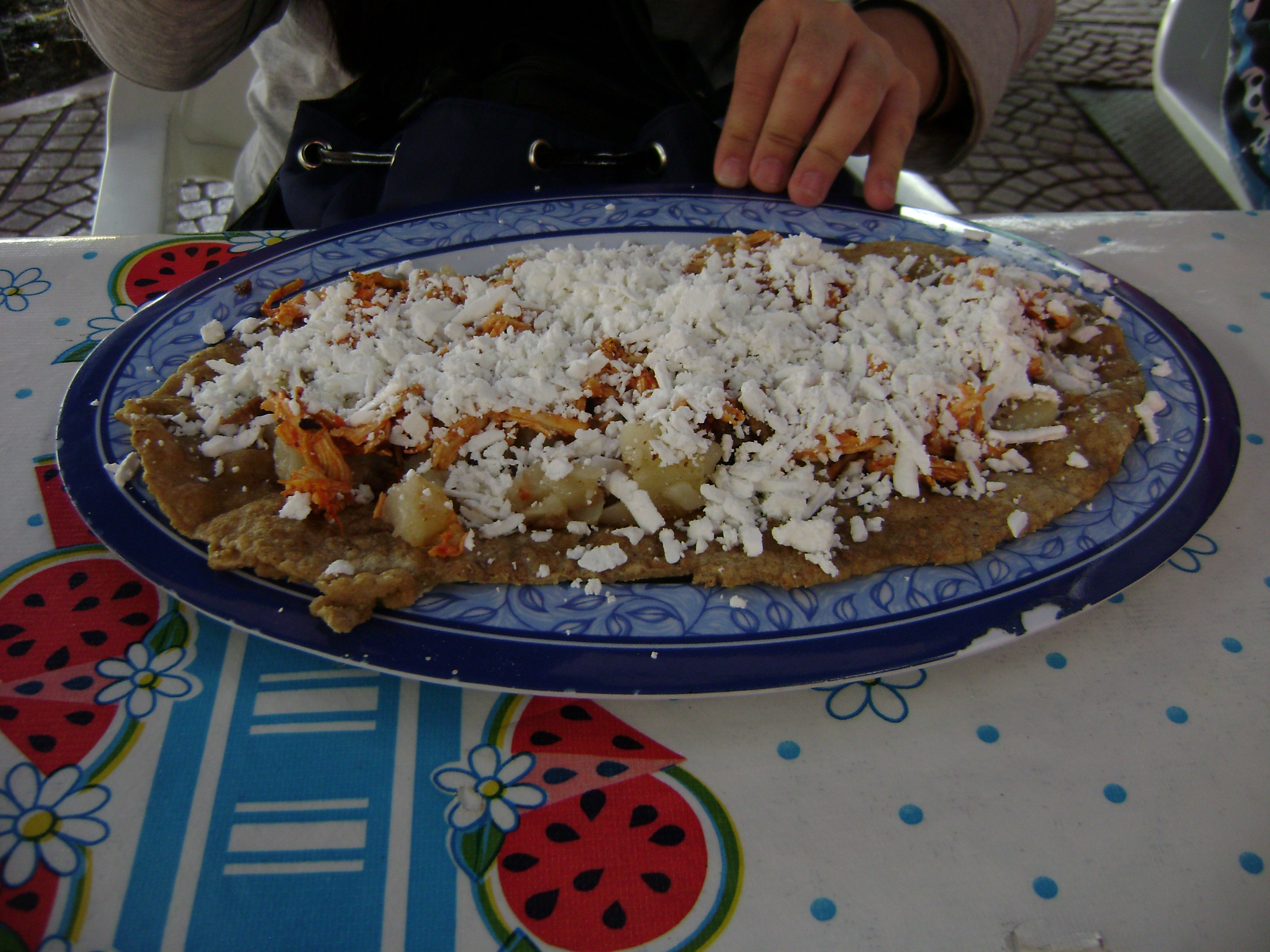
- A huarache with chicken and red salsa, in Mexico City
- Type: antojito
- Place of origin: Mexico City, Mexico
- Main ingredients: corn dough, refried beans, nopalitos, meat, cheese, lettuce, onions, red or green sauce (salsa)

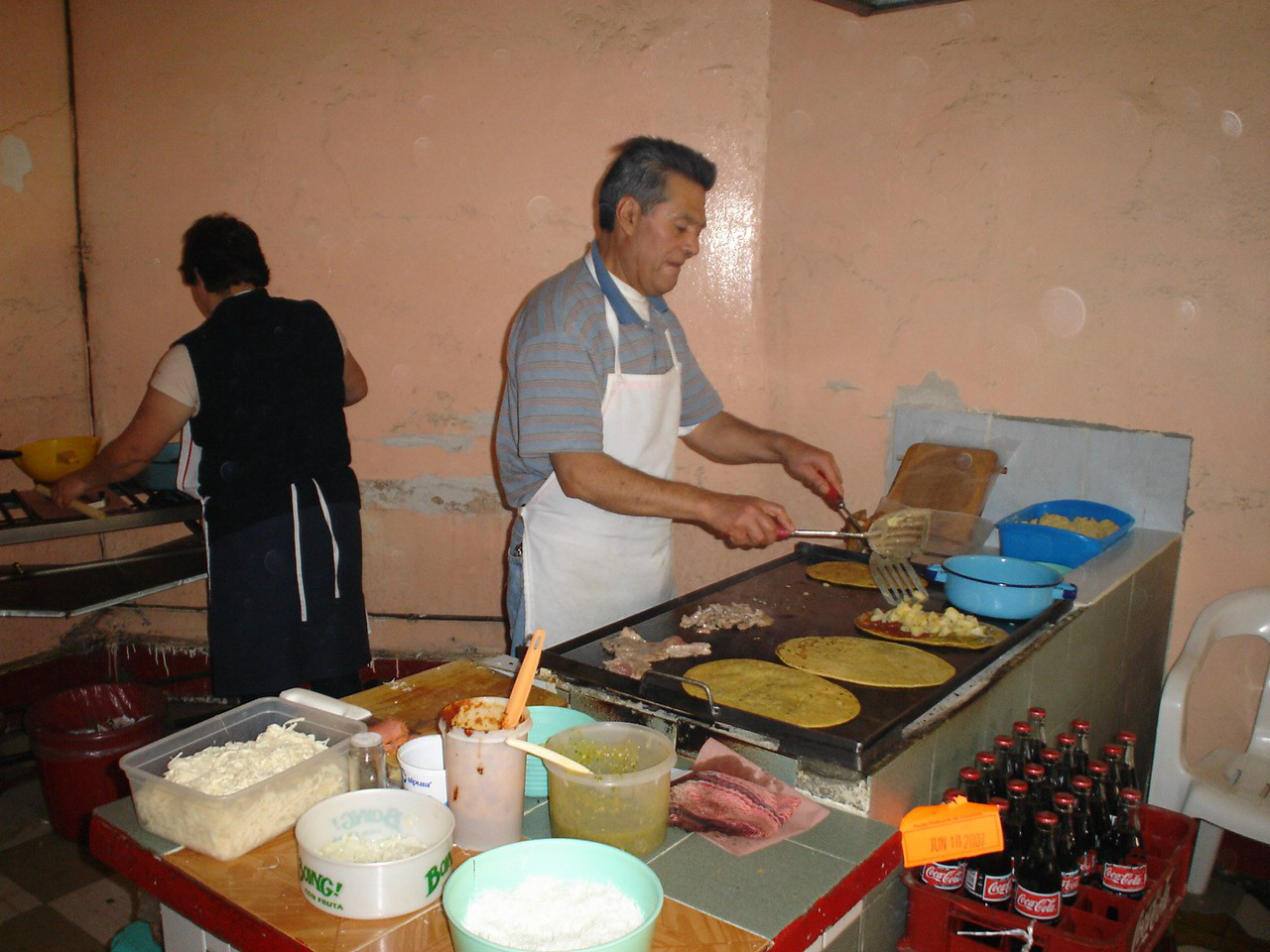
Preparing huaraches

Huarache (sometimes spelled guarache; [waˈɾatʃe]) is a popular Mexican dish consisting of masa dough with smashed pinto beans placed in the center before it is given an oblong shape, fried, topped with green or red salsa, onions, potato, cilantro and any manner of protein such as ground beef or tongue, then finished with queso fresco. Huaraches are also often paired with fried cactus leaves, or nopales. The dish originates from Mexico City.

The name "huarache" is derived from the shape of the masa, similar to the popular sandals of the same name. The word Huarache is originally from Purépecha and the Nahuatl word for huarache is kwarachi. Huaraches are similar to sopes and tlacoyos but differ in shape. The original huarache does not resemble a pambazo or a memela. Neither can it be classified as a tlacoyo. The main characteristic of the huarache is its elongated shape, which differentiates it from other Mexican snacks, which do not have holes in the upper part.

== Origin ==
Huaraches originated in Mexico City in about the early 1930s. Their origin was at a stall along La Viga navigation channel, where Carmen Gómez Medina prepared tlacoyos. When the navigation channel was covered to make the "Calzada de la Viga", Gómez moved to another place and after 1957, when the Mercado de Jamaica was founded, she moved there, and then to a little place at Torno street. Because Gómez's new invention was shaped differently than a sope or a tlacoyo and resembled the sole of a sandal, people started to call it "huarache".

== See also ==
- List of Mexican dishes
