= Tinga (dish) =

Mexican chicken dish

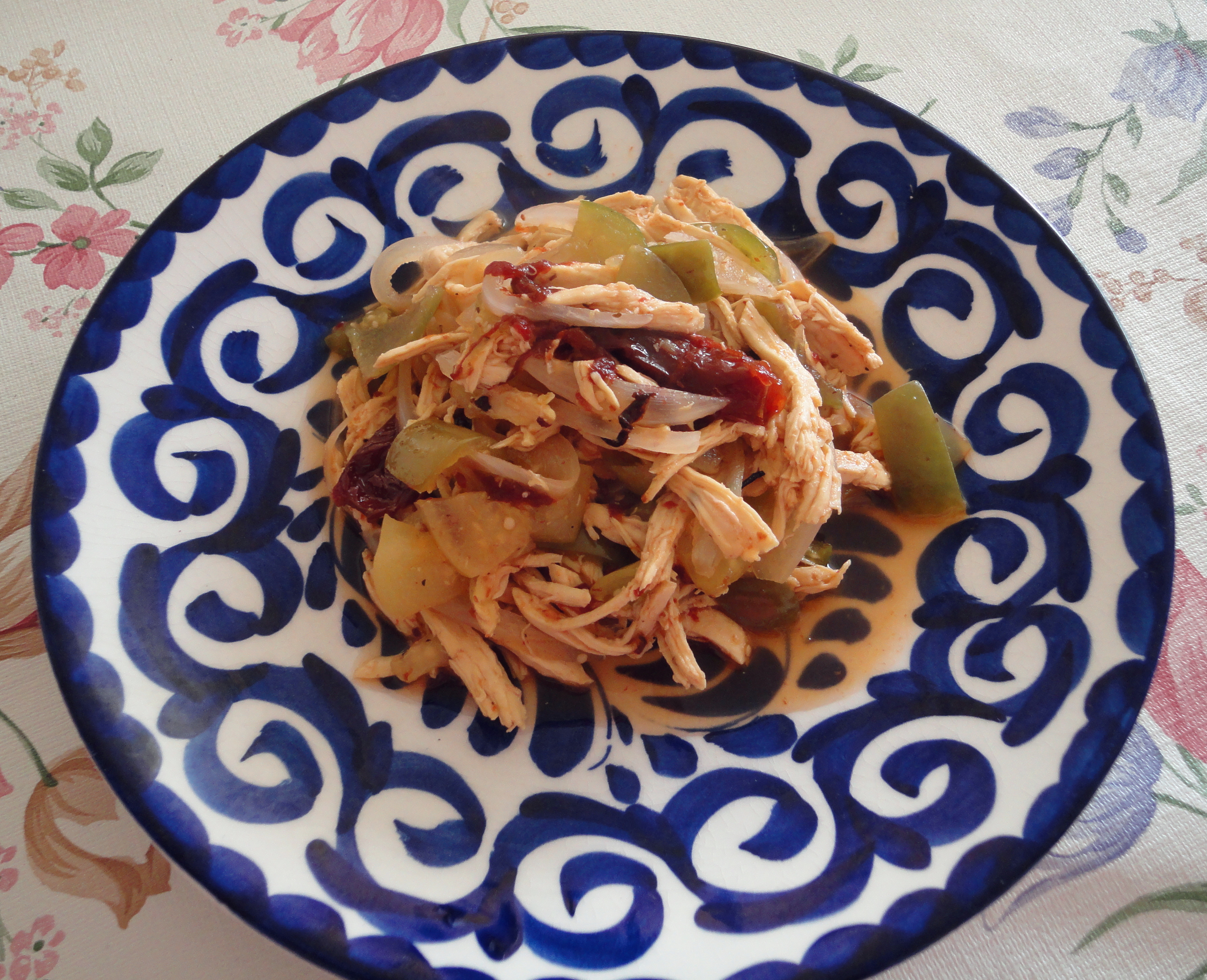
A plate of chicken tinga

Tinga (Spanish: tinga de pollo) is a Mexican dish made with shredded chicken in a sauce made from tomatoes, chipotle chilis in adobo, and sliced onions. Some Mexican versions of tinga use beef instead of chicken. It is often served on a tostada and accompanied by a layer of refried beans. It can be topped with avocado slices, crumbled cheese, Mexican crema, and salsa. Traditionally, Tinga uses the breast or thigh of the chicken, however there are often times different parts of the chicken are used depending on the makeup of the dish.

== Origin ==
Although tinga is consumed throughout central and southern Mexico today, it is presumed to have a Pueblan origin. The first known published recipe for tinga appears in the 1881 cookbook Pueblan Cooking (La cocinera poblana).

In recent years this cuisine has been expanding across the borders and can be found in most Mexican restaurants. Determining the exact place "tinga" originated is difficult due to the lack of sufficient records and information about the dish.

In his Dictionary of Mexicanisms (1895), Francisco J. Santamaría defines "tinga" as a colloquial term to refer to something "vulgar" or "disorderly", though he does not give the etymology of the word.

== See also ==
- List of Mexican dishes
- Pueblan cuisine
