= Tlacoyo =

Mexican dish

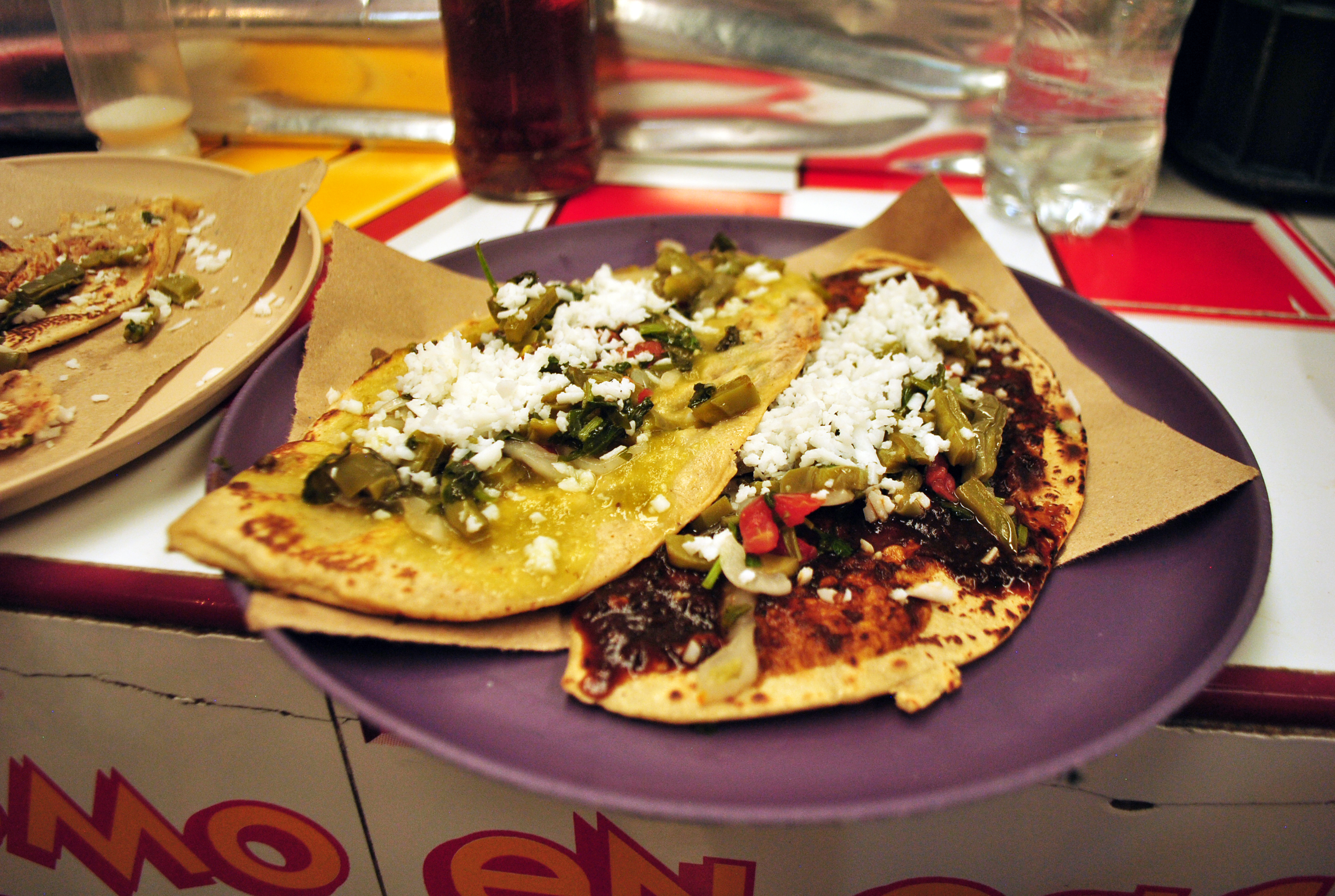
- Tlacoyo with green and chile pasilla sauce
- Type: Pancake
- Main ingredients: Masa

A tlacoyo [tɬaˈkoʝo] is a Mexican dish of pre-Hispanic origin made of masa. Tlacoyos are thicker than fresh corn tortillas and are stuffed with cheese, fava beans, cooked ground beans, chicharron, and other ingredients before being fried or toasted. Tlacoyos can be served as an accompaniment to soups and stews, or as appetizers for celebrations. They are made in varying shapes, most being oval although some are triangular.

Most traditional tlacoyos do not have lard or salt in the masa, so if not eaten soon after they are cooked they become very tough and dry, even if reheated. In Mexican markets, vendors keep their tlacoyos warm by putting them in a covered basket, with the additional effect that the steam keeps them moist for a longer time.

== Etymology ==
The word tlacoyo derives from the Nahuatl word tlahtlaōyoh [t͡ɬɑʔt͡ɬɑˈoːjoʔ]), a name given to an antojito ('snack' or appetizer) typical of central Mexico. Spelling variations include tlayoyis, clacoyos, tlatloyos, tlayoyos and tlaoyos.

== Variations ==
Since it is similar in shape to a huarache (but smaller), and is made of the same corn as the sope and is even thicker (so it has more resistance to wet toppings), Mexican street vendors, especially in Mexico City, sometimes sell it with toppings on it, as an alternative to the sopes and huaraches. However, the traditional tlacoyo is supposed to be consumed without any toppings on it except for fresh salsa. This is the form in which they are typically found in the streets. In the state of Puebla, tlacoyos are smaller and in the shape of triangles.

Tlacoyos come in three different colors, although no artificial colors are added in its preparation. The color comes from the cornmeal used to prepare the masa which the tlacoyo is made with. The most common is blue masa, made from blue corn kernels.

Tlacoyo

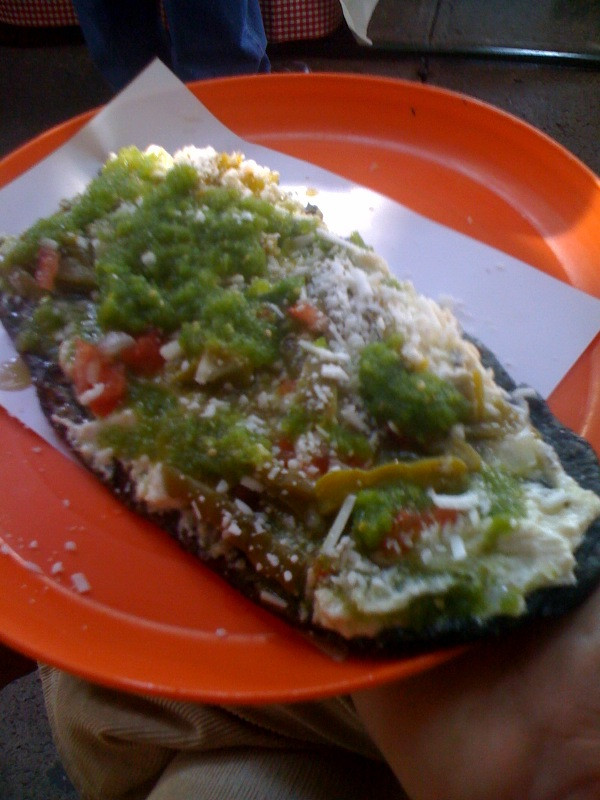
blue corn meal tlacoyo

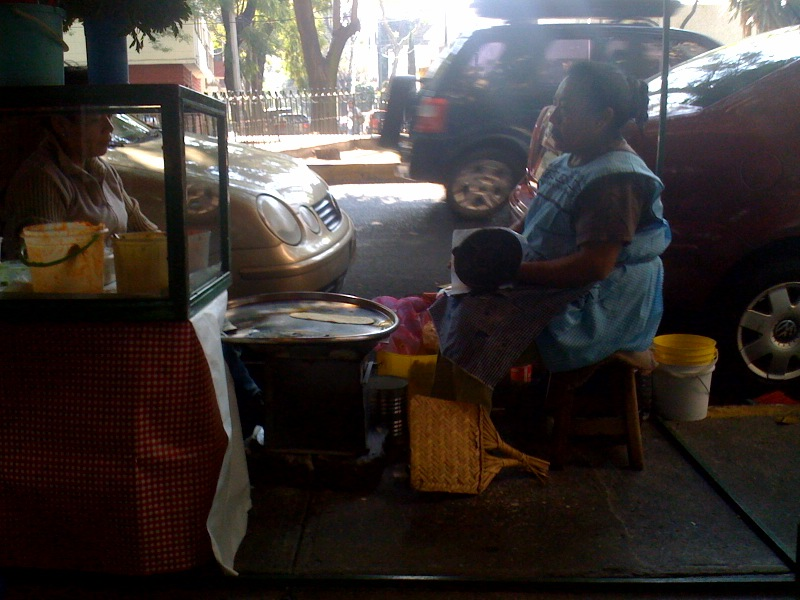
Woman preparing tlacoyos over the sidewalk in Colonia Condesa in Mexico City. The tlacoyo is cooked over a comal which is over an anafre, a kind of coal stove used in Mexican households without any heating energy

== See also ==
- Huarache
- Sope
- List of Mexican dishes
