= Crema (dairy product) =

Mexican dairy product

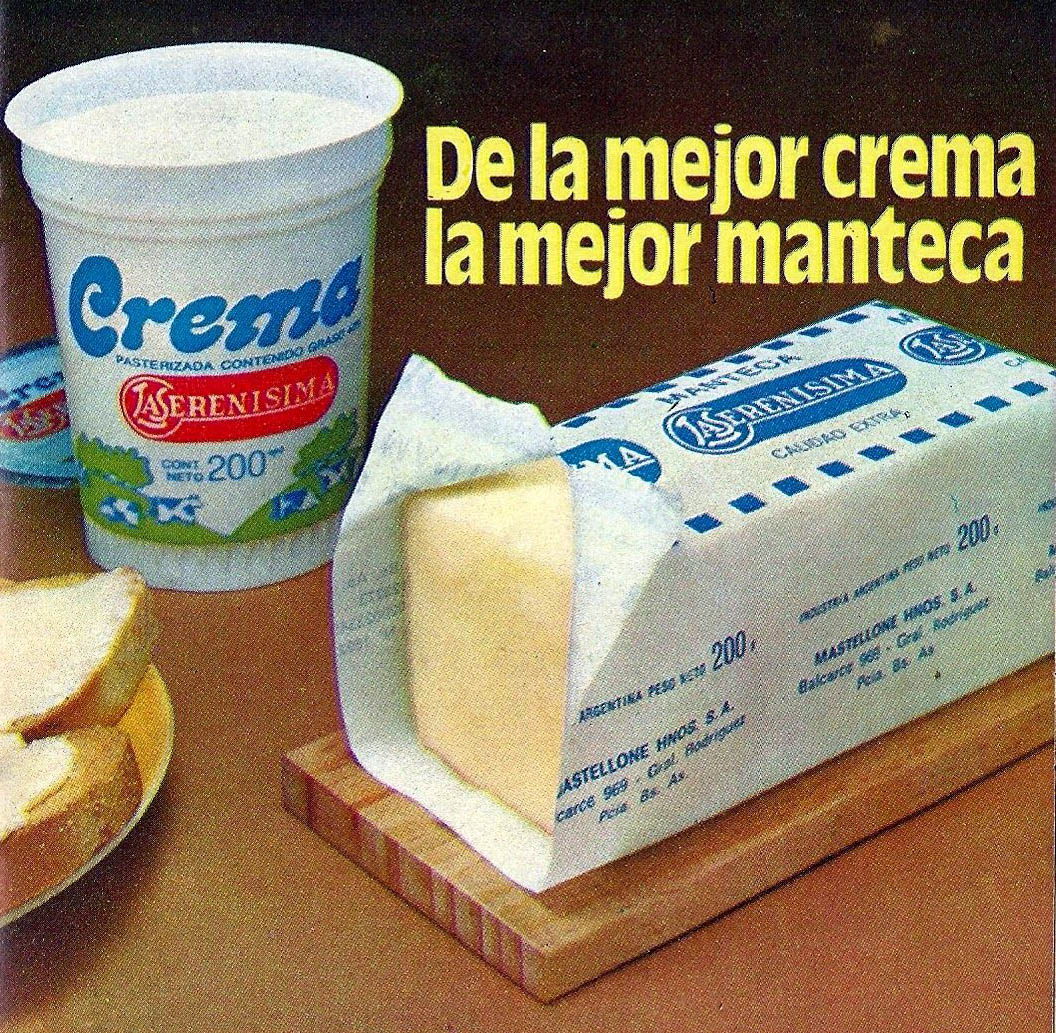
A crema advertisement from Argentina

Crema is the Spanish word for cream and is used in the names of various Mexican and Central American dairy spreads. In the United States, or in the English language, it is sometimes referred to as crema espesa (English: "thick cream"), also referred to as crema fresca (English: "fresh cream") in Mexico. Crema fresca or crema espesa is a Mexican dairy product prepared with two ingredients, heavy cream and buttermilk. Salt and lime juice may also be used in its preparation. Crema's fat content can range between 18 and 36 percent. In Mexico, it is sold directly to consumers through ranches outside large cities, as well as being available in Mexican and Latin American grocery stores in the United States. Crema is used as a food topping, a condiment and as an ingredient in sauces. It is similar in texture and flavor to France's crème fraîche and sour cream.

Crema Chapina and Crema Morazan are some of the Central American varieties. Crema de Chiapas is from Southern Mexico.

== Production ==
Outside of the larger cities in Mexico, crema is sold directly to consumers by ranches that prepare the product. In the United States, commercial preparations of crema are typically pasteurized, packaged in glass jars, and sold in the refrigerated section of Mexican and Hispanic grocery stores. (Note: "Crema espesa is an authentic (and tastier) version of the sour cream served on Americanized Mexican restaurant plates. Found in jars in the refrigerator section, this mild garnish is traditionally drizzled over beans, roasted corn, ...")

== Uses ==
Crema is used as a topping for foods and as an ingredient in sauces. It can be spooned or drizzled atop various foods and dishes. For example, crema is added as a condiment atop soups, tacos, roasted corn, beans and various Mexican street foods, referred to as antojitos. Its use can impart added richness to the flavor of foods and dishes. It may have a mildly salty flavor. In Mexican cuisine, rajas are roasted chili peppers that are traditionally served with crema. The creaminess of crema can serve to counterbalance the spiciness of dishes prepared with roasted chili peppers, such as chipotle.

== Similar foods ==
Crema is similar to the French crème fraîche in flavor and consistency. Compared with sour cream, crema has a softer and tangier flavor, and has a thinner texture. Some recipes that call for the use of crema state that sour cream or crème fraîche can be used as a viable substitute.

== See also ==
- Clotted cream
- List of dairy products
- Smetana
