= Tlayuda =

Traditional Oaxacan dish

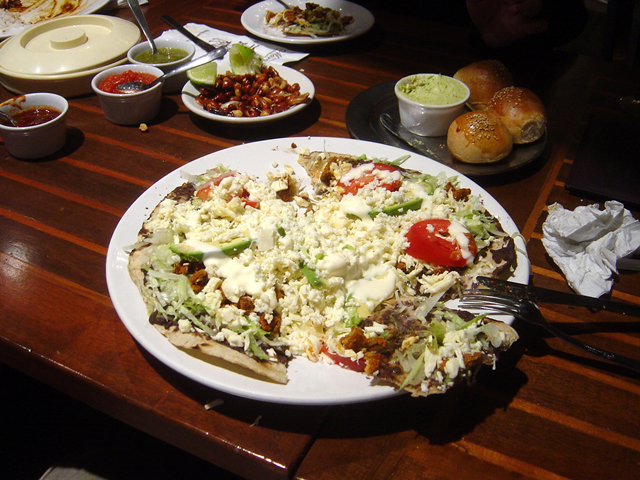
- Open-face tlayuda
- Type: Antojito
- Place of origin: Mexico
- Region or state: Oaxaca
- Main ingredients: Tortillas, refried beans, asiento (unrefined pork lard), lettuce or cabbage, avocado, meat (usually shredded chicken, beef tenderloin or pork), Oaxaca cheese, salsa

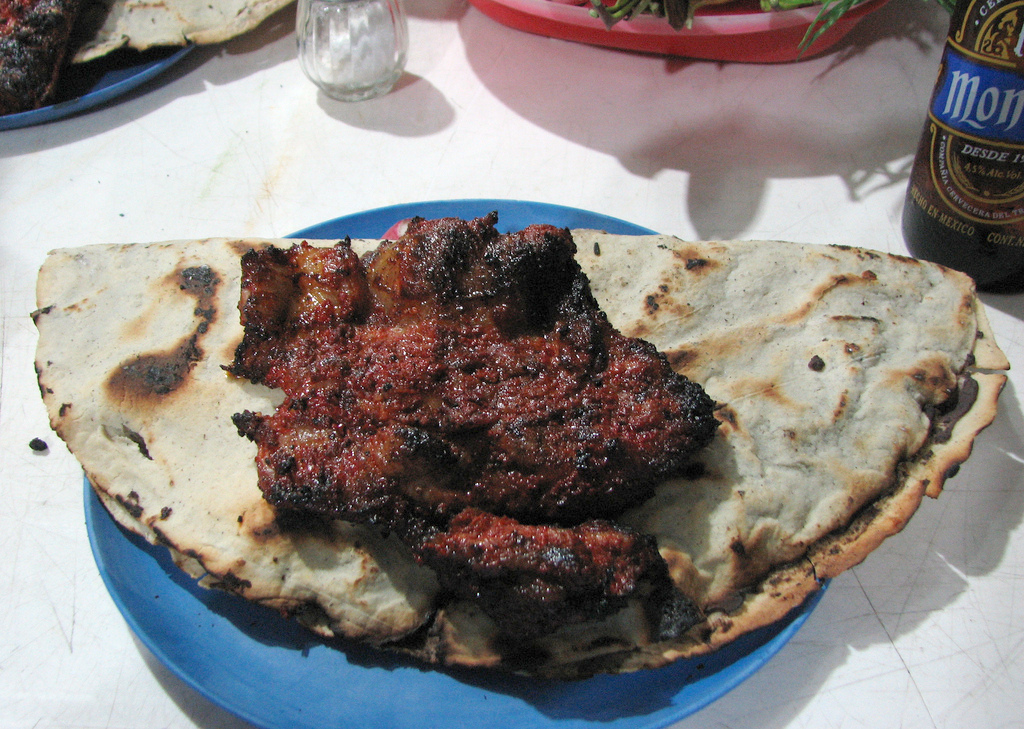
Tlayuda con falda, a tlayuda folded in half and topped with grilled skirt steak

Tlayuda (Spanish pronunciation: [tɬaˈʝuða]), sometimes spelled clayuda, is a handmade dish in traditional Oaxacan cuisine, consisting of a large, thin, crunchy, partially fried or toasted tortilla covered with a spread of refried beans, asiento (unrefined pork lard), lettuce or cabbage, avocado, meat (usually shredded chicken, beef tenderloin or pork), Oaxaca cheese, and salsa.

A popular antojito, the tlayuda is native to the state of Oaxaca. It is regarded as iconic in the local cuisine, and can be found particularly around Oaxaca City. Tlayudas are also available in the center-south region of Mexico, such as Mexico City, Puebla, and Guadalajara.

The dinner-plate-sized tortilla is either seared (usually on a comal) or charred on a grill. Refried beans are then applied, along with lard and vegetables, to serve as a base for the main ingredients. The rules for topping a tlayuda are not strict, and restaurants and street vendors often offer a variety of toppings, including "'tasajo" (cuts of meat typical of the Central Valley of Oaxaca), chorizo, and cecina enchilada (thin strips of chili powder-encrusted pork). They may be prepared open-faced or folded in half.

Its main characteristics are its large size (even more than 40 cm in diameter); its completely different flavor from other types of tortillas; and the slight hardness in its consistency (without being toasted, but rather leathery), which it acquires when it is cooked in a comal, usually made of clay. It is left there to semi-toast; that is, it is cooked for longer than other types of tortillas, and then stored in a tenate, a basket made of palm leaves. It thus acquires its characteristic consistency: flexible to semi-brittle, very slightly moist, fresh, difficult to chew for those who are not used to it, and a very light aroma like burnt tortilla, almost imperceptible. A very light amount of salt in the nixtamal dough with which it is prepared in some cases, as well as its cooking almost until it is toasted, make the tlayuda last longer without decomposing, unlike what happens with common tortillas.

== In popular culture ==
Tlayuda was featured on the Netflix TV series Street Food volume 2, which focuses on Latin American street food.

== See also ==
- List of Mexican dishes
- Mexican pizza
- Tostada
- Memela
