= Antojito =

Mexican street food

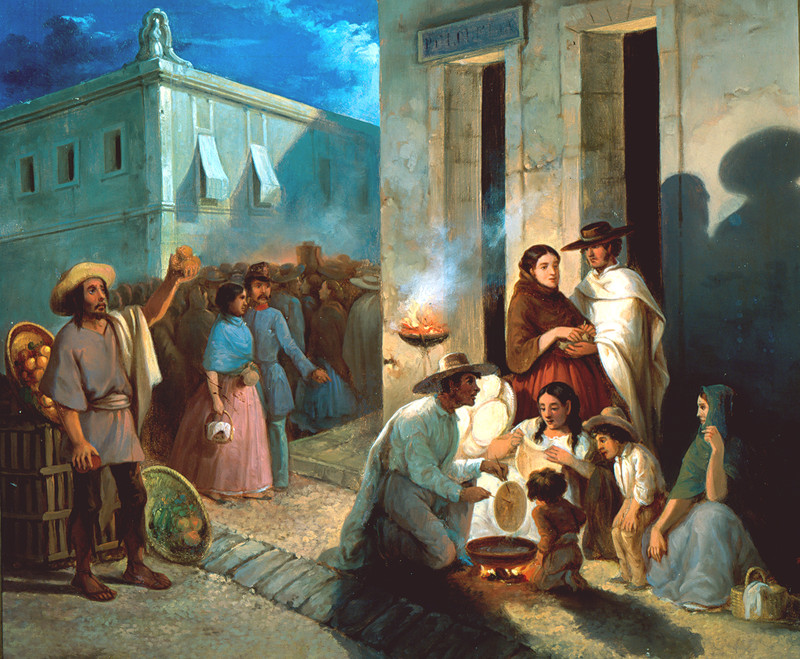
Painting of a buñuelos street vendor in 18th century Mexico

Mexican street food, called antojitos (literally "little cravings"), is prepared by street vendors and at small traditional markets in Mexico. Street foods include tacos, tamales, gorditas, quesadillas, empalmes, tostadas, chalupa, elote, tlayudas, cemita, pambazo, empanada, nachos, chilaquiles, fajitas, tortas, even hamburgers and hot dogs, as well as fresh fruits, vegetables, beverages and soups such as menudo, pozole and pancita. Most are available in the morning and the evening, as mid-afternoon is the time for the main formal meal of the day. Mexico has one of the most extensive street food cultures in Hispanic America, and Forbes named Mexico City as one of the foremost cities in the world in which to eat on the street.

== Definition ==
In Mexican Spanish, the fast foods prepared on the streets and in market stalls are called antojitos (literally "little cravings") because they are typically foods not eaten at a formal meal, especially not the main meal of the day, la comida, which is served in the mid-afternoon. However, there are exceptions. Street foods are easiest to find in the early morning and then the evening and late into the night. They are harder to find outside Mexico City in the mid-afternoon. The majority of the food is corn-based. It is also found at street markets called "mercado sobre ruedas" and tianguis. Other areas in Mexico City noted for their street food are San Pedro de los Pinos market, Mercado San Juan Arcos de Belen, Calle López in the historic center and the Mercado de Antojitos ("street food market") in Coyoacán.

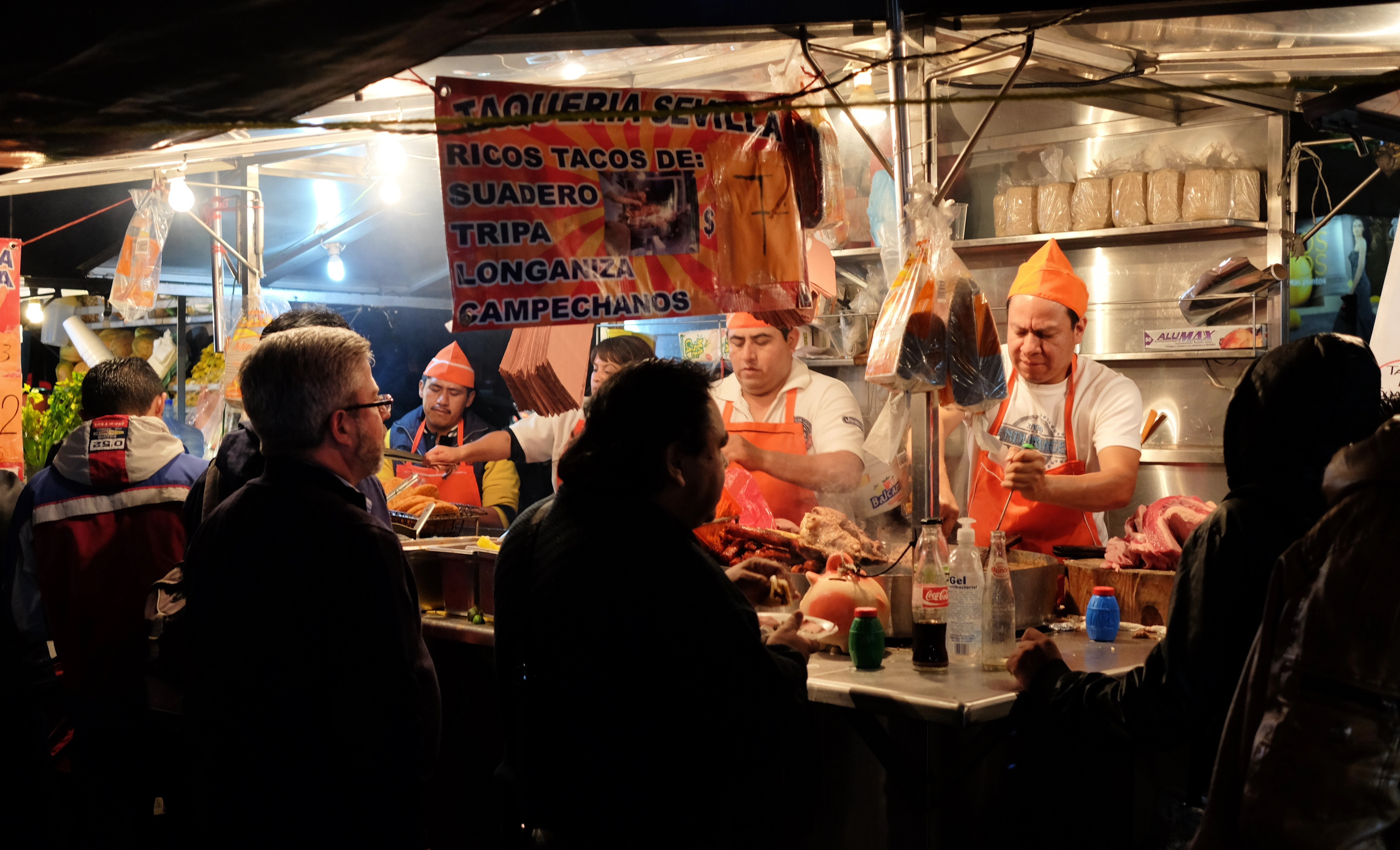
A taco stand in Sevilla, Mexico City

Mexico has one of the most extensive street food cultures in Latin America, with about 43% of the population believing that it is not harmful and about 58% eating on the street at least once a week. Mexican food was named by UNESCO as an intangible cultural heritage of mankind, and Forbes named Mexico City one of the top ten cities for street food in the world. Street and market food has had a significant impact on haute cuisine in Mexico, with upscale restaurants serving many of the same foods as in the streets, sometimes modified and sometimes not. It has influenced the United States, where Houston chef Hugo Ortega and Chicago chef Rick Bayless have both published books dedicated to Mexico's street food. In the United States, Mexican-style street food can be found in small counter-service restaurants and the variety being demanded goes beyond Tex-Mex into the regional foods of Mexico. With more than 100 years of Mexican-style street food history, Los Angeles is known for its street food lunch trucks, serving tacos, tortas, quesadillas and more. Tacos can follow the traditional recipes of Mexico or be more creative.

== Types ==
Tacos de carnitas, carne asada and al pastor

=== Tacos ===
The taco is a folded tortilla with some kind of filling. Mexican street taco fillings vary from one region to another. Most tacos are made with corn tortillas, except in the very north of the country where wheat flour tortillas dominate. The tortillas used in Mexican tacos are soft, although the entire taco can be fried, which is called "dorado" (lit. golden). The taco has its origins in the pre-Hispanic period, when other foods were eaten with tortillas, and used as a scoop. The modern taco developed in Mexico's rural areas when wives would bring their husbands' meals to the fields wrapped in tortillas. Tacos arrived in the city when stands began to sell foods known to the many rural people who migrated to them in the 20th century. This is especially true for Mexico City, which offers taco specialties from just about every region of the country. The taco bridges social and economic barriers in that everyone in the country eats it, leading it to be called "the most democratic of Mexican foods."

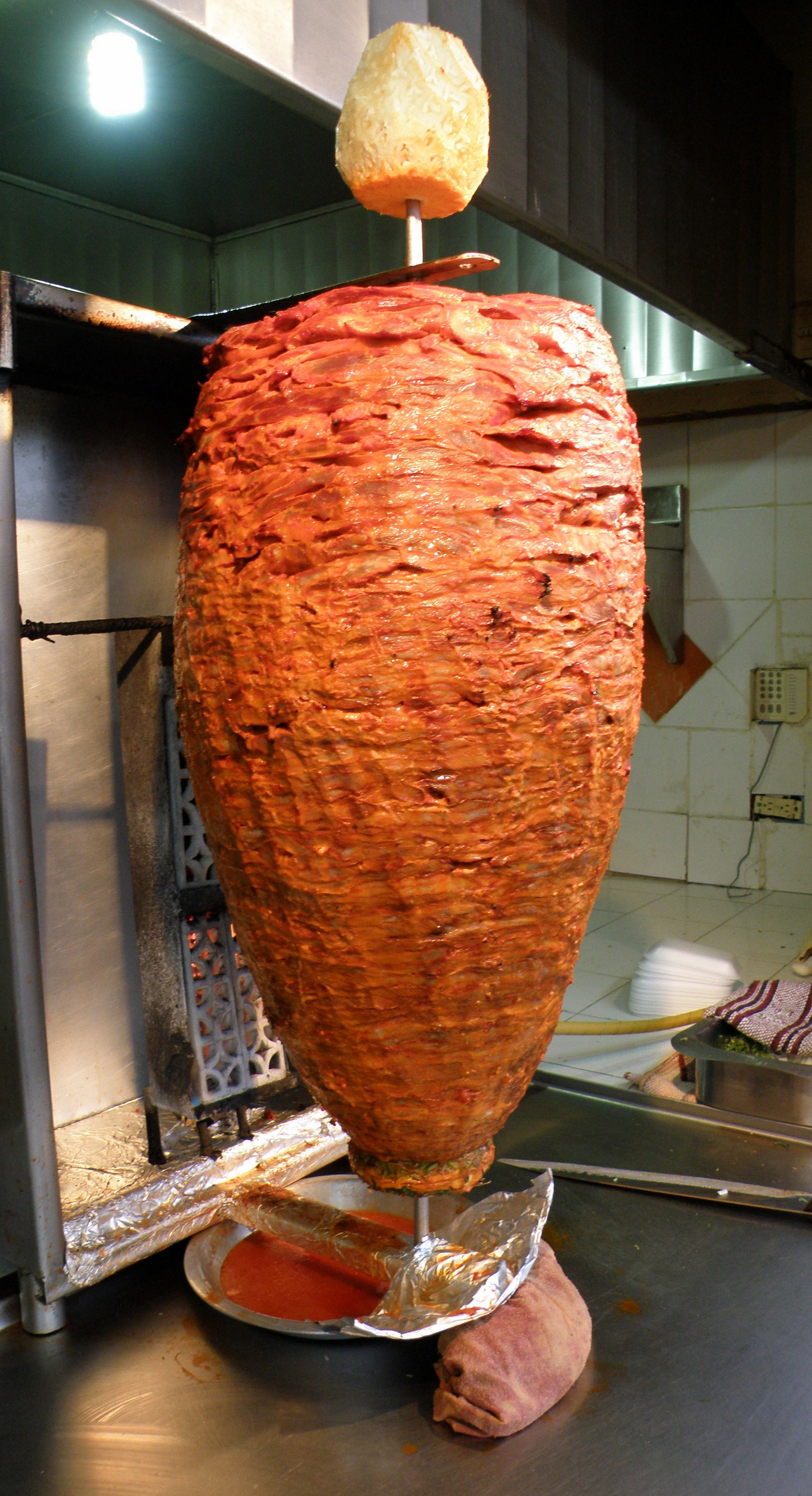
Taco al pastor meat on a spit

The fillings for tacos vary widely and most taco vendors have a specialty, the most known are al pastor and bistec. There are also tacos for more adventurous people that are filled with beef eyes, brains, or tongue. Taco vendors are usually distinguished from other street food vendors by having a large block of wood called a tronco, on which meat and other fillings are minced with a cleaver. Garnishes vary but usually include chopped onion, cilantro, various salsas, grilled green onions, and lime wedges. Many taco varieties are generally available only in the morning or afternoon. Tacos most often found in the morning hours include tacos de canasta and those with barbacoa or cabeza de res (lit. beef head). Tacos de canasta (basket tacos) are the only kind that are not prepared on the spot. They are tortillas with fillings such as potatoes, chorizo sausage, pork rind, beans and picadillo (a spiced ground meat), then steamed and wrapped to keep warm and carried in a basket. Barbacoa is pit-roasted meat. It is most commonly found in the center of the country, where the preferred meat is mutton. In the north of the country, there is a version made with beef. Cabeza de res are made from meat and other parts of a steer, most commonly found in Sonora, the Bajío region and Mexico City. Vendors of these kinds of tacos usually sell out and close by midday.

During the afternoon, outside of Mexico City, tacos are generally not available until later in the day. In the late afternoon until well into the night (especially on weekends) other taco stalls open with a different selection. These are principally grilled, fried, or steamed meat. One famous night taco in the Mexico City area is tacos al pastor (shepherd-style tacos). They are an adaptation of Middle Eastern spit-cooked meat, introduced by Lebanese immigrants. However, the meat is pork and the seasoning is a mild chili pepper, onions and pineapple. Other taco varieties include tacos de guisado, or tacos de cazuela, which are filled with meat or vegetables in a sauce.

Fritangas are tacos with fried meat such as sausage. Carnitas is pork cooked in lard flavored with orange rind. It was originally a specialty of Michoacán and Jalisco, but now can be found in most of the center of the country and in other parts of the country as well. The best-known grilled taco is carne asada (grilled meat) which originated in Sonora. It is beef grilled over charcoal, originally mesquite. These are served with grilled green onions and, depending on the region, served with flour or corn tortillas. Fish tacos are a speciality of Baja California and the Pacific coast. They have also become very popular in parts of the United States. Codzitos are small tacos popular in the Yucatán Peninsula, which are fastened with toothpicks and then fried. Flautas, also called taquitos or tacos dorados, are similar to tacos in that they are filled, but they are then rolled and fried. They are served topped with cream, salsa, and vegetables such as lettuce, tomatoes and onions.

=== Tamales ===
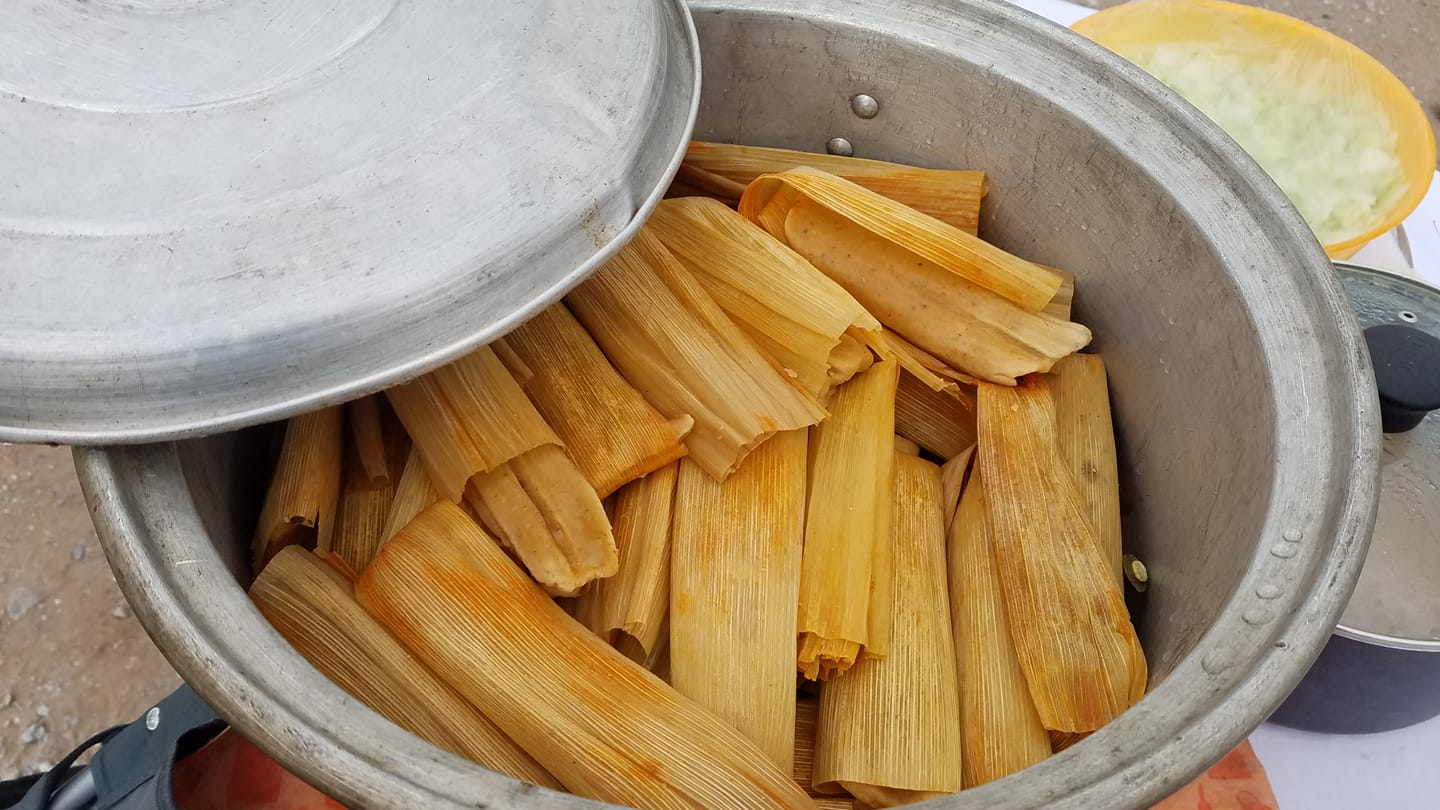
Tamale being sold in Reynosa, Tamaulipas

Tamales feature a filling and are wrapped in corn-based masa dough and steamed in corn husks. Tamales come in sweet and savory versions, some spicy and some bland. Versions with pork or chicken with a salsa or mole sauce are the most popular, along with a version called "rajas" that are filled with strips of poblano chili pepper and cheese. It is one of the safer street foods for novices to try as it is cooked and kept in a steam vat while being sold. Corundas are a variety of tamale in Michoacán in a triangle shape wrapped in corn stalk leaves. They can be eaten alone, with salsa or as an accompaniment to a meal. The Chiapas version of the tamale has a distinct flavor, often containing ingredients such as pibil, mole sauce, carrot, corn grains, egg, raisins, almonds (known locally as nacatamales, a regional version of Nicaraguan well-known version), a version with the regional herb chipilín with chicken or queso blanco and versions wrapped in banana leaves. They are often sold by vendors on specially made tricycles for street vendors. Uchepos are tamales made with fresh corn, generally made in Michoacán in July and August.

=== Camotes ===
Camotes are sold by camoteros, street vendors who prepare sweet potatoes and plantains in wood-fired carts. They are commonly served with toppings such as condensed milk, strawberry jam, cajeta, sugar, or cinnamon. The carts use a steam valve that produces a distinctive whistle, which vendors use to announce their presence.

=== Additional foods ===
There are other street foods made with tortillas. Tostadas are flat hard tortillas either fried or dried on which are placed a variety of toppings such as shredded chicken, pork, beef, seafood, cheese and salsa. Quesadillas are derived from the Spanish word for cheese, queso, and refer to a tortilla folded in half and filled with cheese and possibly other ingredients such as spicy meat, mushrooms, chili pepper strips and more. The type of cheese used generally varies by region and in some areas, cheese is not even used unless requested. Empalmes are three stacked corn tortillas with beans, some kind of meat or stew which are typical in the state of Nuevo León. Known as "sincronizadas", the Spanish word for synchronized, are two corn tortillas with a meat and cheese filling then toasted on each side until the cheese melts. "Gringas", as the slang word for people with lighter skin tones, are similar to quesadillas or sincronizadas but made with flour tortilla, hence the name. Tlayudas are large dried tortillas topped with beans and other ingredients similar to a pizza or large tostada popular in the state of Oaxaca.

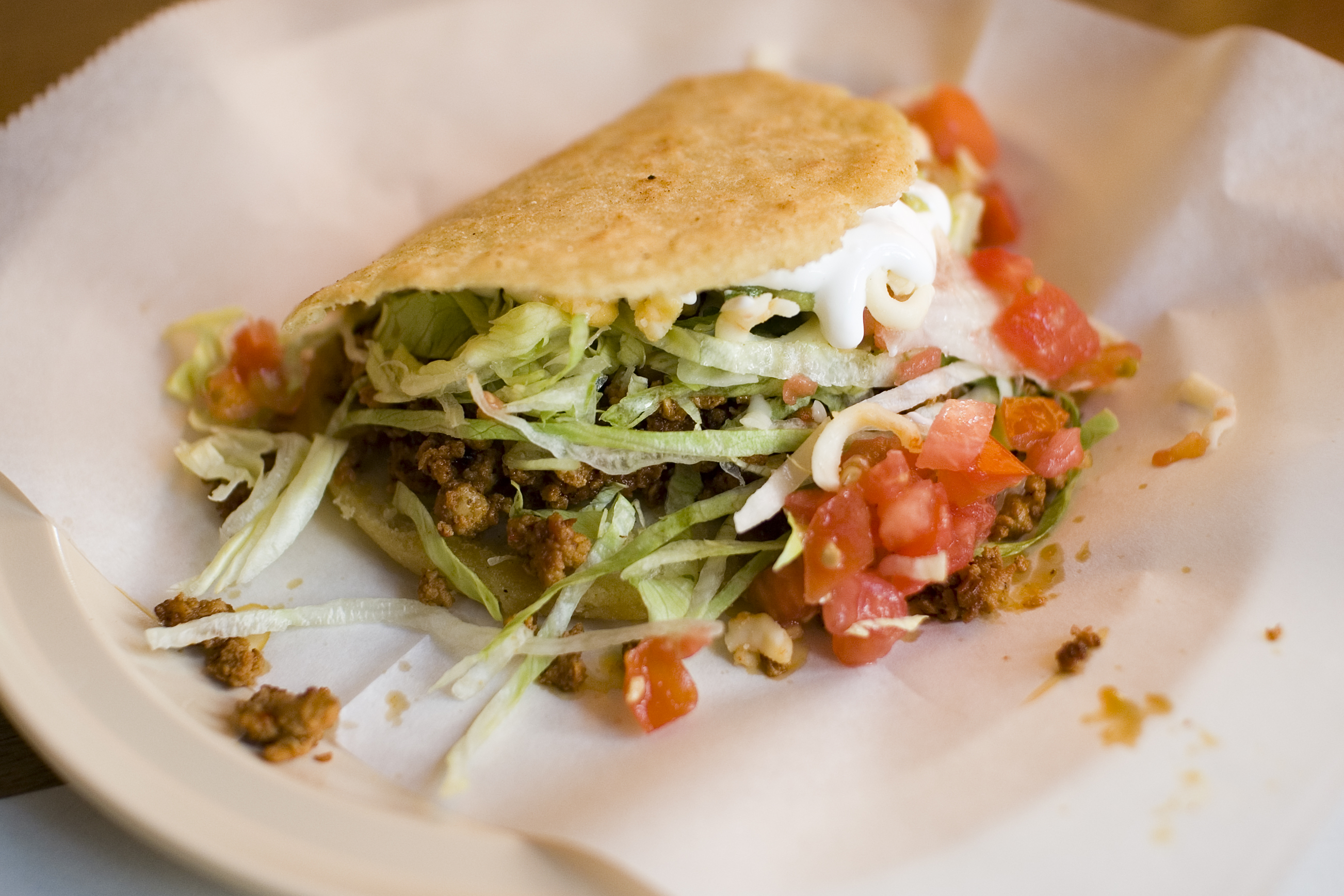
Stuffed gordita

There are street foods that use the same corn dough used to make tortillas, but in different preparations. Gorditas can be found in almost all parts of the country. They are very thick corn dough patties fried in oil or cooked on a comal (a traditional griddle). After cooking, they are split and filled with a variety of ingredients. There is a flour dough version of this in Coahuila. Bocoles are small round gorditas popular in Hidalgo, Tamaulipas, Veracruz and San Luis Potosí. After cooking they are split and filled with ingredients such as cheese, picadillo, salsa, beans or cooked eggs. Empedradas are triangular pieces of blue corn dough mixed with chickpeas and then cooked on a comal popular in Tlaxcala. Garnachas are thick tortillas similar to gorditas split and filled with shredded pork and diced onion. On top is placed salsa, cheese, and a vinegar and chili pepper sauce. Memelas, also called picadas, are long thick tortillas made of corn dough mixed with fried pork rind and salsa. They are cooked on a comal and then topped with tomato sauce and chopped lettuce or cabbage. Tlacoyos are the most popular in Mexico City. They are elongated and usually made with blue corn dough which is filled with a paste made of beans before being cooked on a comal.

Chalupas are small tortilla-like cups of fried corn dough filled with cheese, beans or a variety of stews topped with salsa and chopped lettuce. They are most popular in Puebla. Similarly, chilapas are tortilla cups fried crispy in the form of a cup and then filled with shredded meat, salsa, cream, avocado, chili peppers and chopped lettuce and onion. They are a specialty of Chilapa, Guerrero. Huaraches are similarly large and flat and topped with chopped or shredded meat, and any of the following: beans, cheese, cream and salsa. Sopes are also flat and thick but in disk form, pinched on the edges then topped with beans, salsa and more.

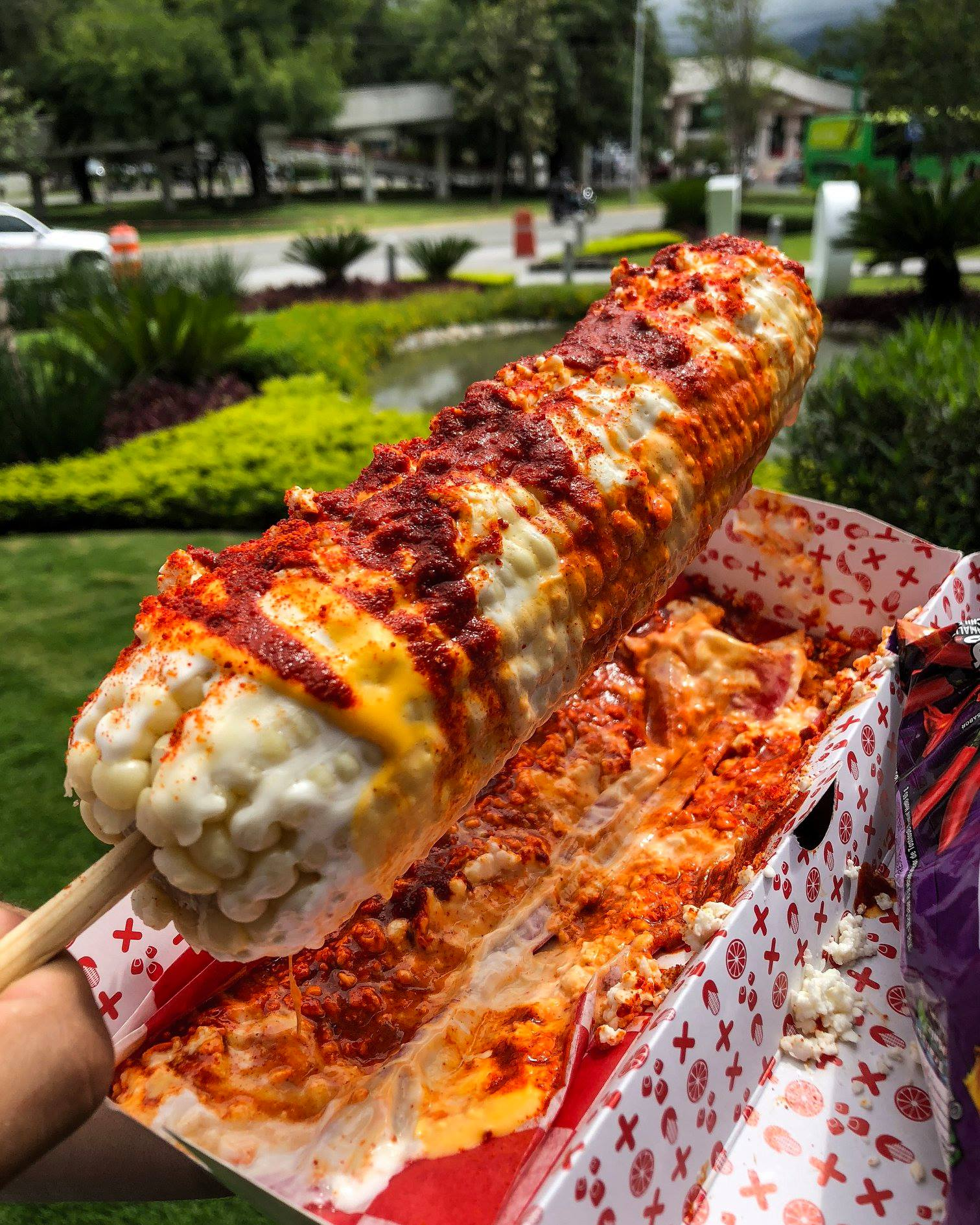
Elote preparado (prepared corn)

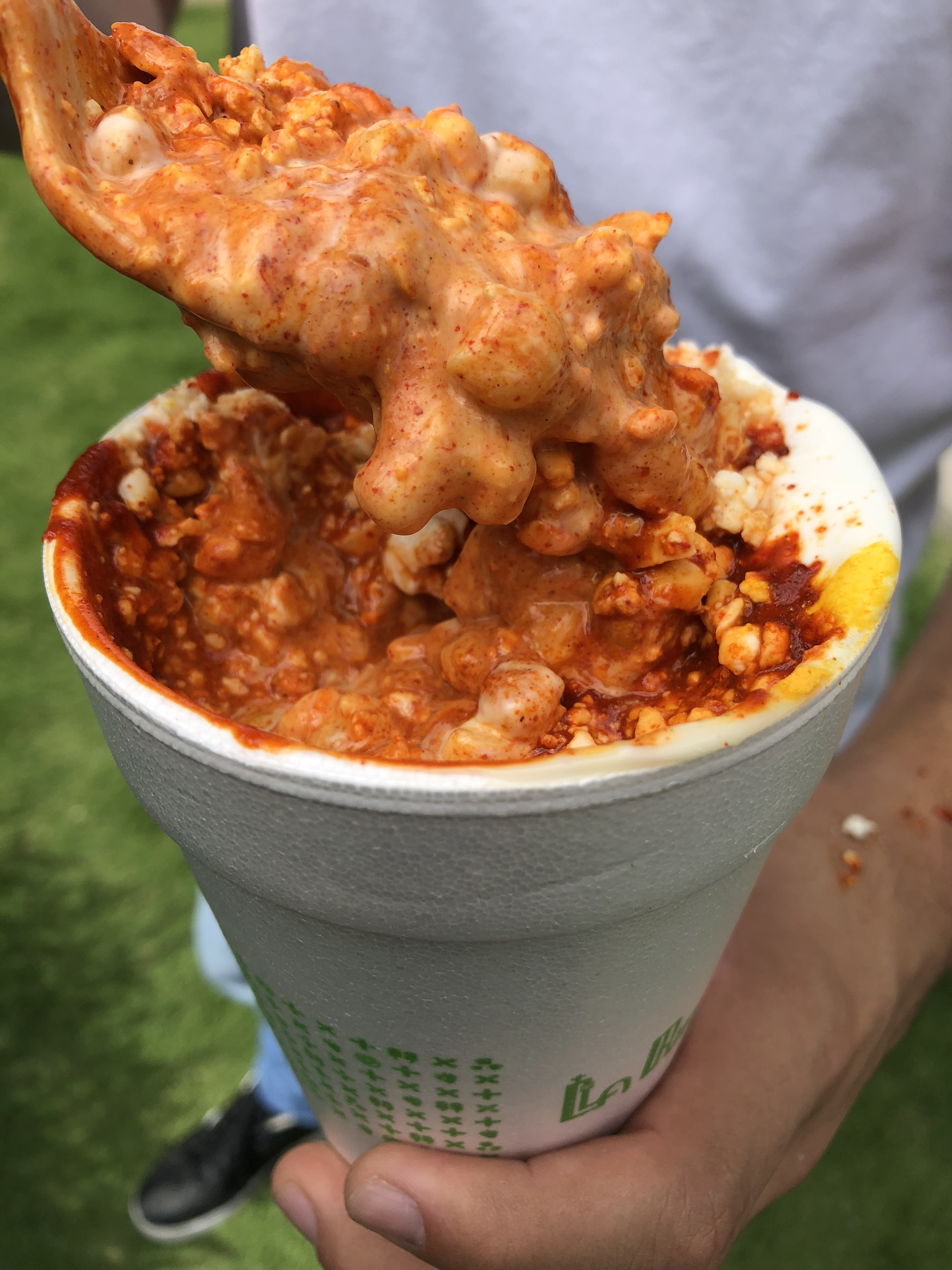
Esquite, also known as elote en vaso (cup corn)

Elote refers to fresh corn (maize) which is served on the cob or cut kernels. If on the cob is it either grilled or boiled then coated with mayonnaise and dusted with any of the following: chili pepper, salt, cotija cheese, lime juice and hot sauce. The cut kernels are usually served in a dish called esquites, where similar seasoning is mixed in and it is eaten with a spoon. Fresh fruits and vegetables can also be had as street food. Fruit cups are popular and vary depending on the season. They usually contain one or more of the following, watermelon, papaya, mango, orange, jicama and cucumber. These are cut into slender spears or cubes with lime juice, salt and chili pepper powder added. Jicama is a root vegetable that is popularly eaten raw. It can be eaten in strips or chunks as part of a salad or fruit cup. A jicaleta is a large slice of vegetable placed on a stick and resembles a kind of large lollipop. It can either be eaten like this or then covered with a choice of sweet or savory flavored powders, hot sauce, lime juice and more.

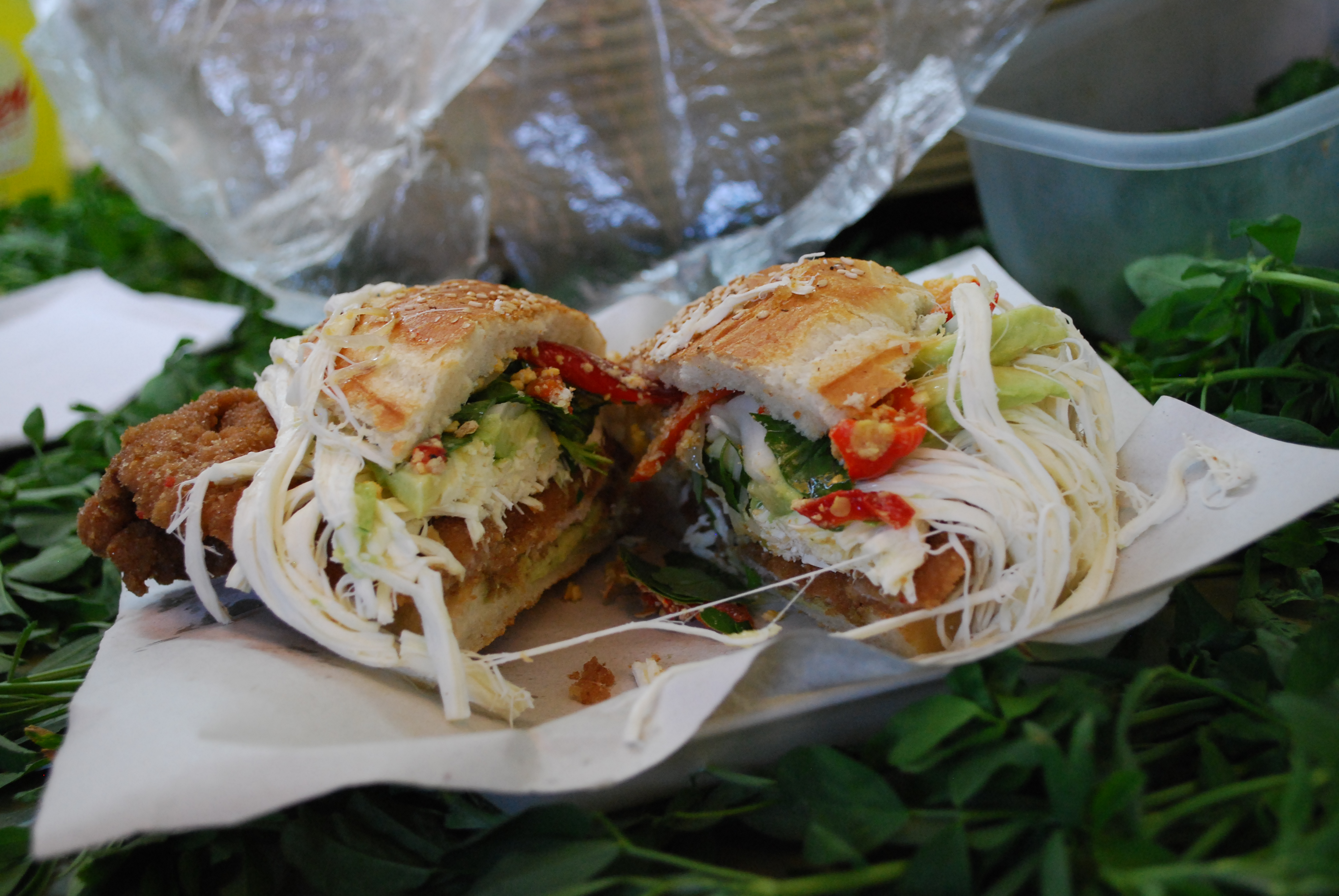
Cemita sandwich as served in Puebla

The Spanish and later the French introduced a variety of wheat breads which have been adapted into a variety of street foods. Tortas are rolls that are cut to make thick sandwiches with various fillings. These include refried beans, cheese, various hot meats such as breaded chicken or pork, carnitas, egg and more or with cold cuts, along with avocado, onions and pickled jalapeños.

Tortas can be found in cold or warm varieties. The first is usually found at public transport stops or in front of schools. In Puebla, a similar sandwich is called a cemita, named after the style of bread used to make it. Molotes are a type of torta, bread with a filing and salsa which varies by region. In Hidalgo, they are cylindrical and filled with chicken, cheese or beef. In Oaxaca, they are filled with chorizo sausage and potatoes and in Tlaxcala, they are shaped like a pointed oval. Pambazos are small tortas filled with various ingredients, with salsa covering the filling (in Veracruz) or coating the bread (in Mexico City). In the Yucatán, small tortas are called salbutes which are heated on comals, and filled with tomatoes, cabbage, onions and meat. Another European-derived dish is the empanada, which is flour or sometimes corn flour turnovers that enclose a filling and is baked. In Hidalgo, they are called "pastes" after the English word "pasty".

=== Soups ===
Not all Mexican street foods are based on breads. Street stalls and markets serve soups and broths such as menudo, pozole and pancita. Caldo de pollo is chicken soup. Priced by the piece of chicken included, it usually also contains rice and chickpeas, with condiments such as oregano, onions, salt, lime juice and chili peppers available.

=== Beverages ===
In addition to food, there are several kinds of drinks popular on the streets. Aguas frescas are a classic street drink. They are often made with fruits such as watermelon, mango, orange, lime, etc., water and sugar, but others are made with rice (called horchata), coconut and tamarind as well as a hibiscus flower tea called Agua de Jamaica. In the south of the country, fermented corn drinks like tejuino are popular and come in various forms. In Tabasco, Chiapas and parts of the Yucatán Peninsula, it is known as pozol, often flavored with chocolate and served cold.

== See also ==
- Street vendors in Mexico City
- Taco stand
- Tostilocos
