= List of tortilla-based dishes =

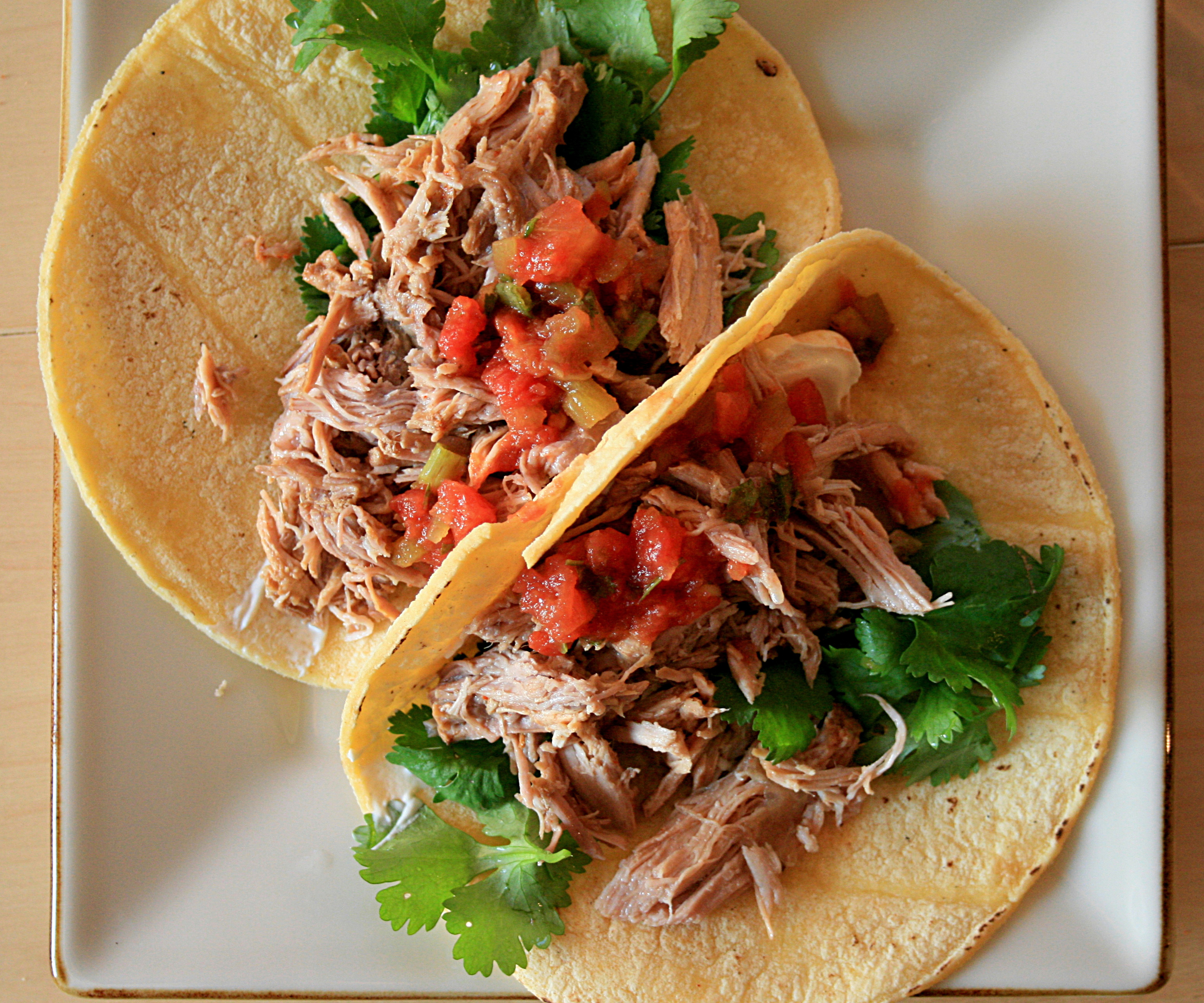
Tacos prepared with corn tortillas and a carnitas filling

This is a list of tortilla-based dishes and foods that use the tortilla as a primary ingredient. A tortilla is a type of soft, thin flatbread made from finely ground corn or wheat flour that comes from Mexico and Central America and traditionally cooked on a comal (cookware). Originally derived from the corn tortilla (tortilla in Spanish means "small torta", or "small cake"), a bread of maize which predates the arrival of Europeans to the Americas, the wheat flour tortilla was an innovation after wheat was brought to the New World from Spain while this region was the colony of New Spain. It is made with an unleavened, water-based dough, pressed and cooked like corn tortillas.

== Tortilla-based dishes ==
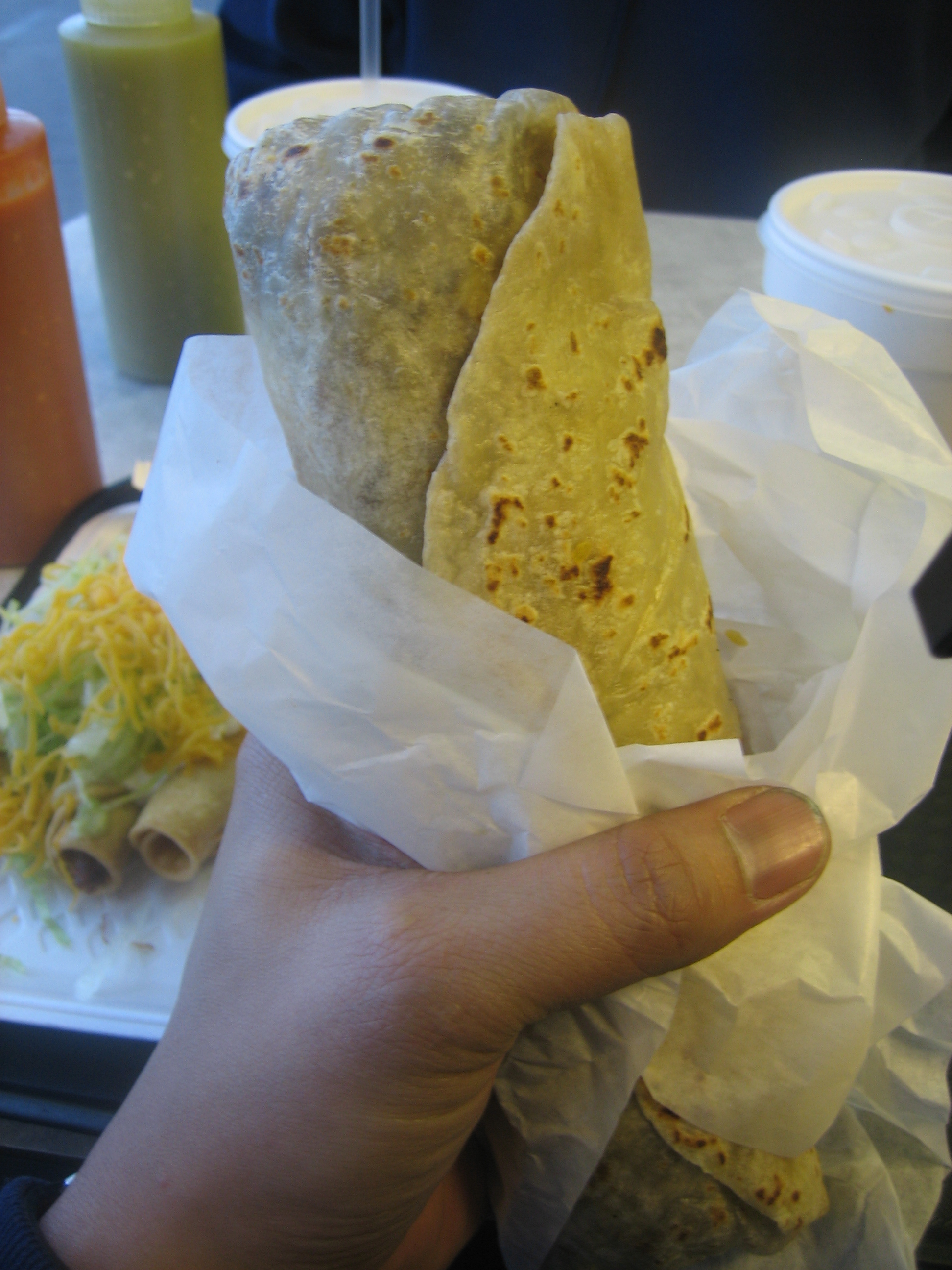
A burrito prepared with a flour tortilla

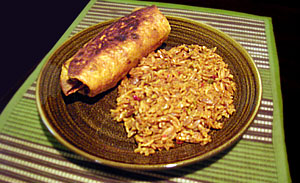
A chimichanga with rice

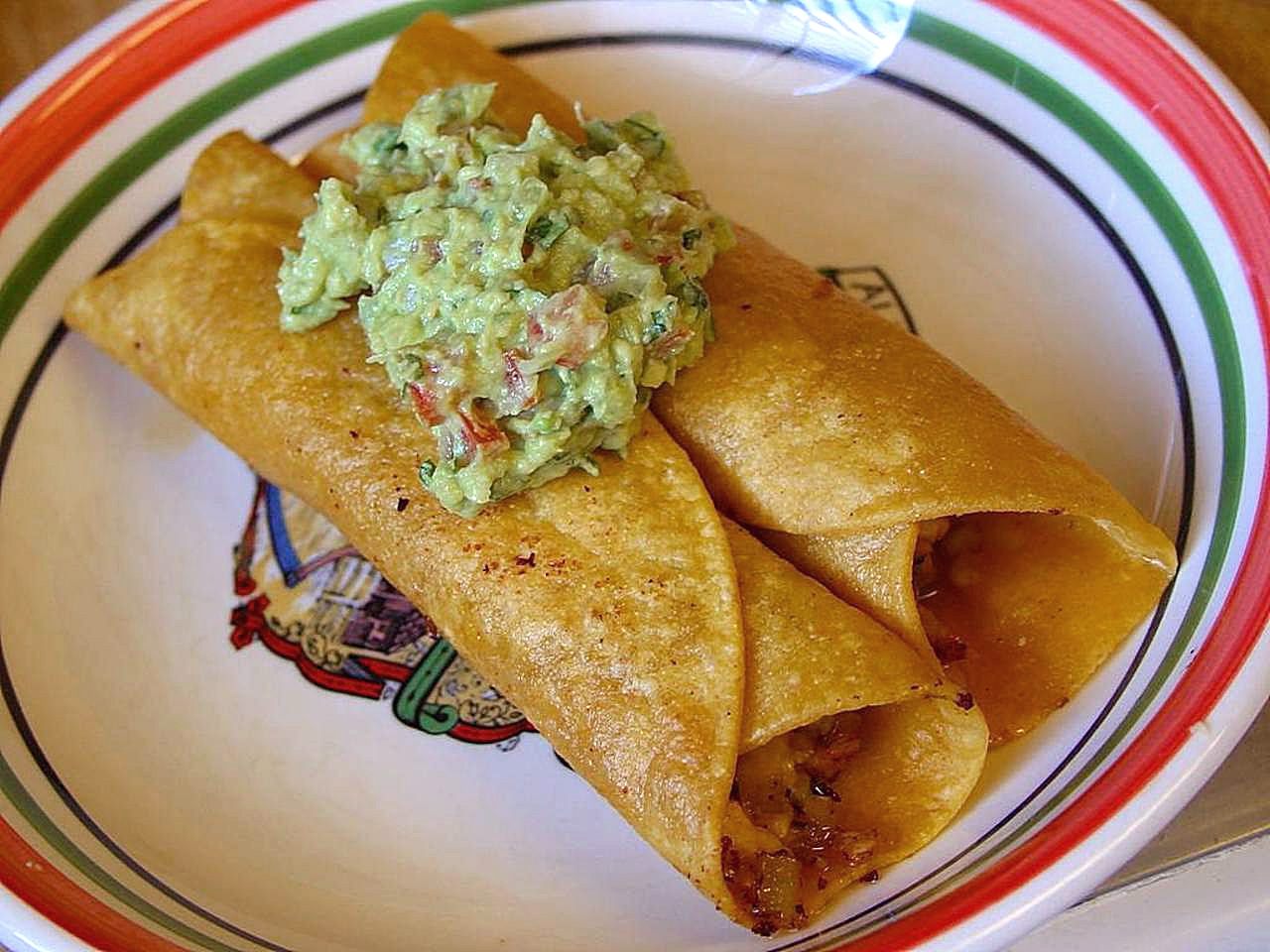
Taquitos topped with guacamole

- Alambre – Mexican food
- Arizona cheese crisp – Cheese dish
- Burrito – Tex-Mex dish consisting of a wheat flour tortilla wrapped to enclose the filling
- Chalupa – Mexican specialty dish
- Chilaquiles – Traditional Mexican dish
- Chimichanga – Mexican and Southwestern American dish
- Corn burrito – Mexican-style dish made of corn tortilla filled with refried beans
- Empalme – Mexico originated food
- Enchilada – Corn tortilla rolled around a filling and covered with a sauce
- Entomatada – Mexican food dish
- Fajita – Tex-Mex dish
- French tacos
- Garnache – Mesoamerican dish
- Gringas – Variety of tacos
- Güirila – Maize tortilla
- Huevos motuleños – Yucatán breakfast dish
- Huevos rancheros – Mexican breakfast dish
- North American migas – Spanish and Portuguese dish
- Nachos – Tortilla chip dish
- Panuchos – Tortilla dish from the Yucatán peninsula
- Quesabirria – Mexican dish
- Quesadilla – Mexican dish of tortillas with melted cheese
- Salbutes – Tortilla dish from the Yucatán peninsula
- Sincronizada – Mexican tortilla
- Taco – Mexican filled tortilla dish
- Taquito – Mexican dish
- Tlayuda – Traditional Oaxacan dish
- Tortilla chip – Snack food made from corn tortillas
- Tostada – Flat or bowl-shaped tortilla that is deep-fried or toasted

== See also ==
- Corn tortilla
- List of bread dishes
- List of Mexican dishes
- Mexican street food
- New Mexican cuisine
- Tortilla warmer
- Wheat tortilla
