= Enfrijoladas =

Mexican dish

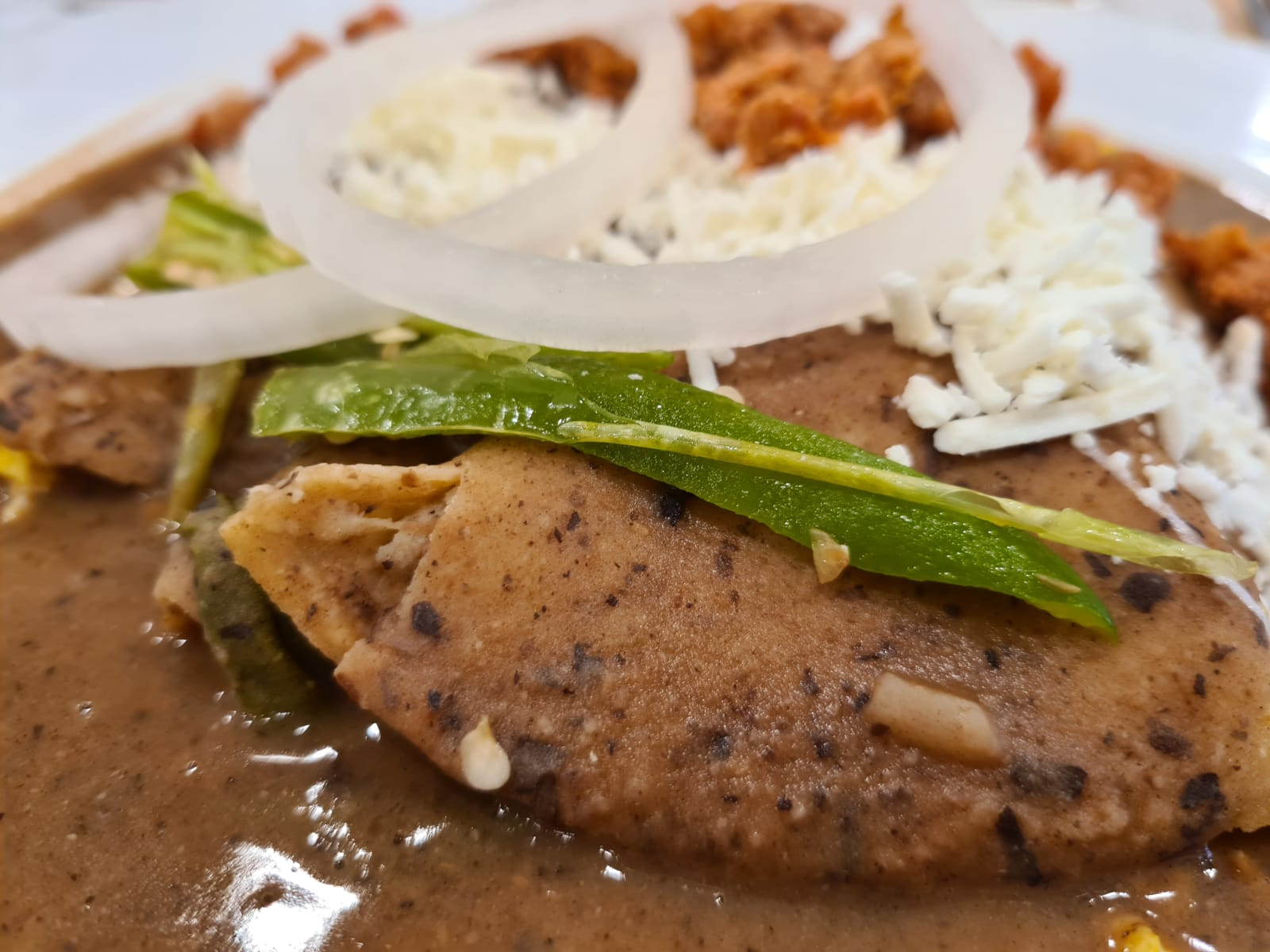
Enfrijolada filled with scrambled eggs, served with cheese, onion, chorizo, and crema

Enfrijoladas are a Mexican dish made of corn tortillas rolled around a filling and covered in a savory bean sauce. They are similar to enchiladas, but are prepared using a sauce made from refried beans rather than chili peppers. Enfrijoladas are typically served with cheese, onions, and crema. There are regional differences to the recipe, and it is also eaten in some parts of Central America. In Mexico, Enfrijoladas is often served as a breakfast dish.

The bean purée is made by soaking cooked beans in their own cooking water, or by blending them and adding enough water to achieve a liquid consistency. The soaked mixture is usually then cooked in a pot where sliced onions and garlic are fried in either lard or vegetable oil, allowing the onions and garlic to flavor the purée.

== See also ==
- Enchilada
- Entomatada
- Encebollado
- List of Mexican dishes
- List of tortilla-based dishes
