= Hacienda Atalaya =

- Location in El Salvador
- Coordinates: 13°36′0″N 89°50′0″W
- Country: El Salvador
- Department: Sonsonate Department
- Municipality: Acajutla

Hacienda Atalaya is a village in Acajutla municipality in the Sonsonate Department on the coast of El Salvador.

It is located half a mile from the town of Acajutla itself. Nearby towns and villages include El Amatal (4.4 nm), Suncita (1.9 nm), Hacienda San Pedro (2.2 nm), Hacienda San Antonio (1.9 nm) and Club Salinitas (4.1 nm).
