= Chilaquiles =

Traditional Mexican dish

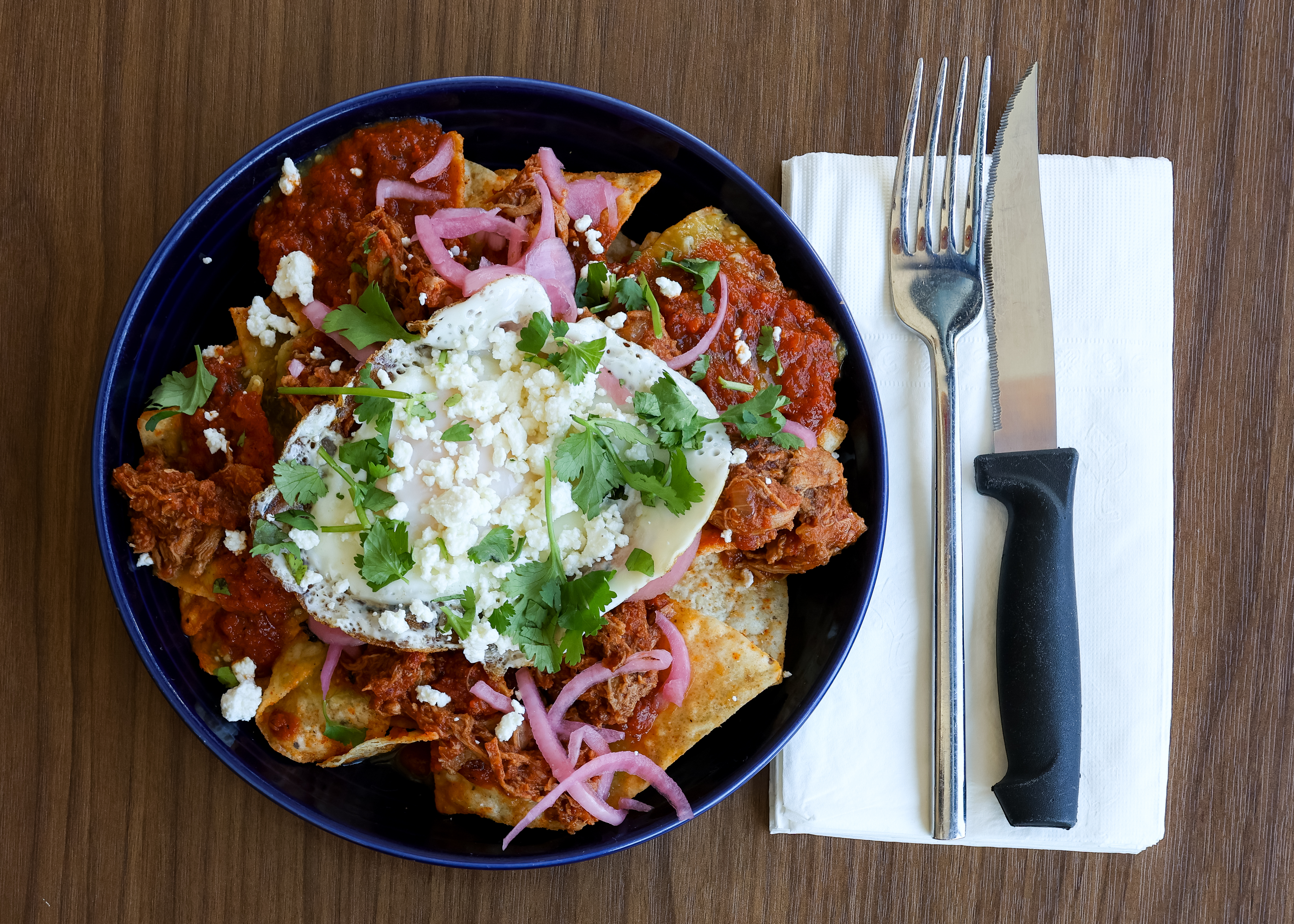
- Course: Breakfast
- Place of origin: Central and Northern Mexico
- Main ingredients: Tortillas, green or red salsa, pulled chicken, cheese, refried beans, scrambled eggs

Chilaquiles (Spanish pronunciation: [tʃilaˈkiles]) are a traditional Mexican breakfast dish made with tortillas.

== Ingredients and variations ==
Typically, leftover tortillas are the basis of the dish. Green or red salsa is poured over the crisp tortilla triangles. The mixture is simmered until the tortilla starts softening. Pulled chicken is sometimes added to the mix. It is commonly garnished with crema, crumbled queso fresco, sliced onion, and avocado slices. Chilaquiles can be served with refried beans, eggs (scrambled or fried), and guacamole as side dishes.

As with many Mexican dishes, regional and family variations are quite common. Usually, chilaquiles are eaten at breakfast or brunch. This makes them a popular recipe to use leftover tortillas and salsas.

== Etymology ==
Nahuatl names for chilaquiles	1st component	English literal	Pronunciation (IPA)	2nd component	English literal	Pronunciation (IPA)
chīlāquilitl	chīlātl	chile water	[ˈt͡ʃiːlaːt͡ɬ]	quilitl	edible plant	[ˈkilit͡ɬ]
tlaxcalpōpozōn	tlaxcalli	tortilla	[t͡ɬaʃˈkalːi]	pōpozōn	foam	[poːˈposoːn]

== Regional variations ==
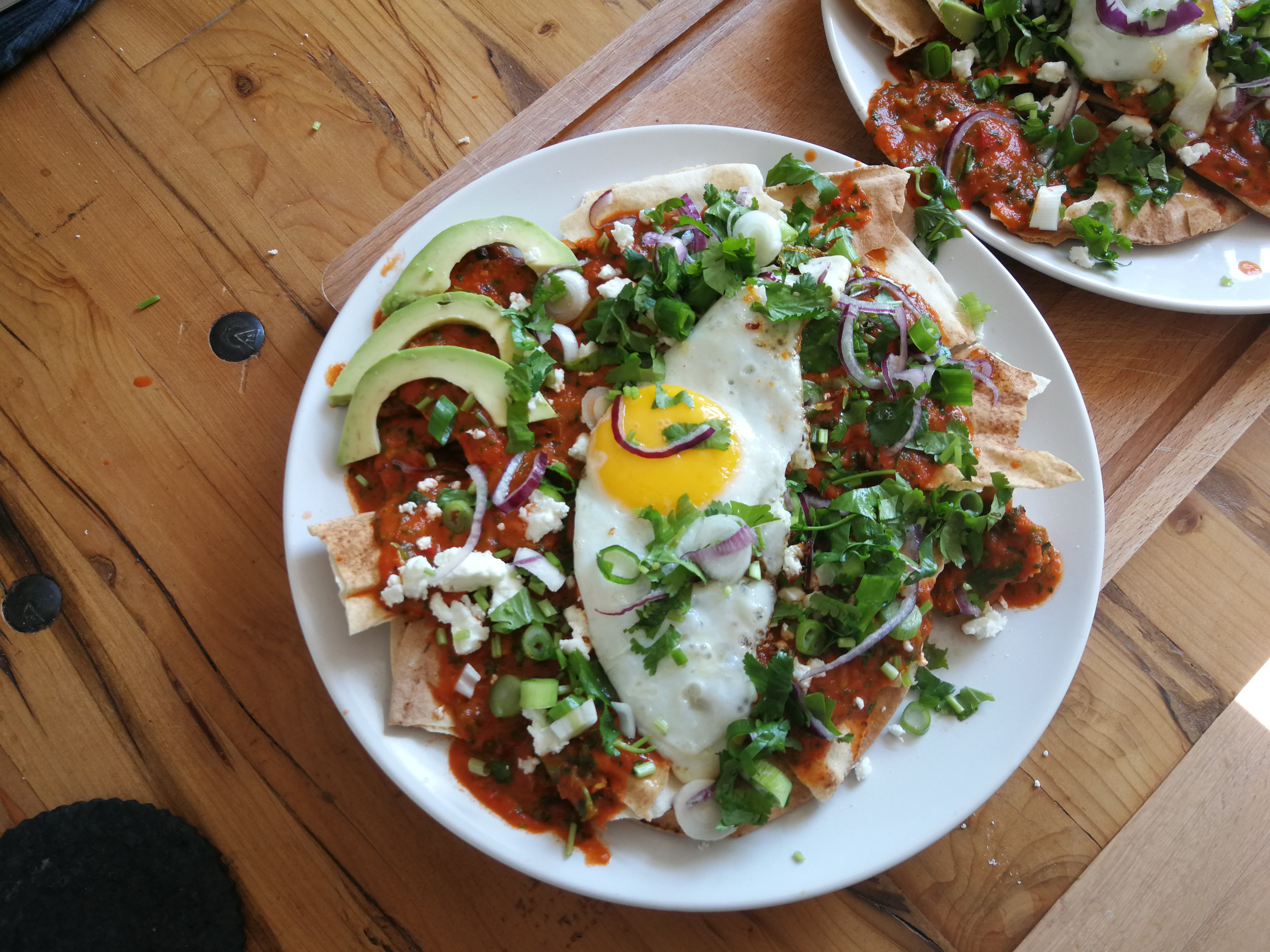
Chilaquiles with a fried egg

In central Mexico, it is common for the tortilla chips to remain crisp. To achieve this, all ingredients except the salsa are placed on a plate and the salsa is poured at the last moment before serving. In Guadalajara, cazuelas are kept simmering, filled with chilaquiles that become thick in texture, similar to polenta. In the state of Sinaloa, chilaquiles are sometimes prepared with cream. In the state of Tamaulipas, red tomato sauce is commonly used. In the state of San Luis Potosí, it is also common to serve chilaquiles with cecina rather than pulled chicken.

=== History in the United States ===
Encarnación Pinedo published El cocinero español (The Spanish Cook) in 1898 in California and included recipes for chilaquiles tapatíos a la mexicana, chilaquiles a la mexicana, and chilaquiles con camarones secos (chilaquiles with dry shrimp).

As Mexican communities expanded across the United States, chilaquiles became a popular dish in Mexican-American households and restaurants, particularly in the Southwest. Over time, American adaptations emerged, incorporating local ingredients and culinary influences. Some variations featured scrambled eggs, cheese blends, and different types of salsa to cater to local palates. In Tex-Mex cuisine, chilaquiles sometimes took on a heartier form, with additions like pulled pork, beans, or avocado. The dish also gained popularity in brunch menus, especially in urban areas with a strong Mexican food scene, where chefs experimented with fusion-style toppings such as feta cheese, kale, or chipotle-infused sauces. Despite these adaptations, the core elements of crispy tortilla pieces softened in sauce have remained central, preserving the dish’s traditional roots while allowing for creative reinterpretations in modern American cuisine.

== Gallery ==
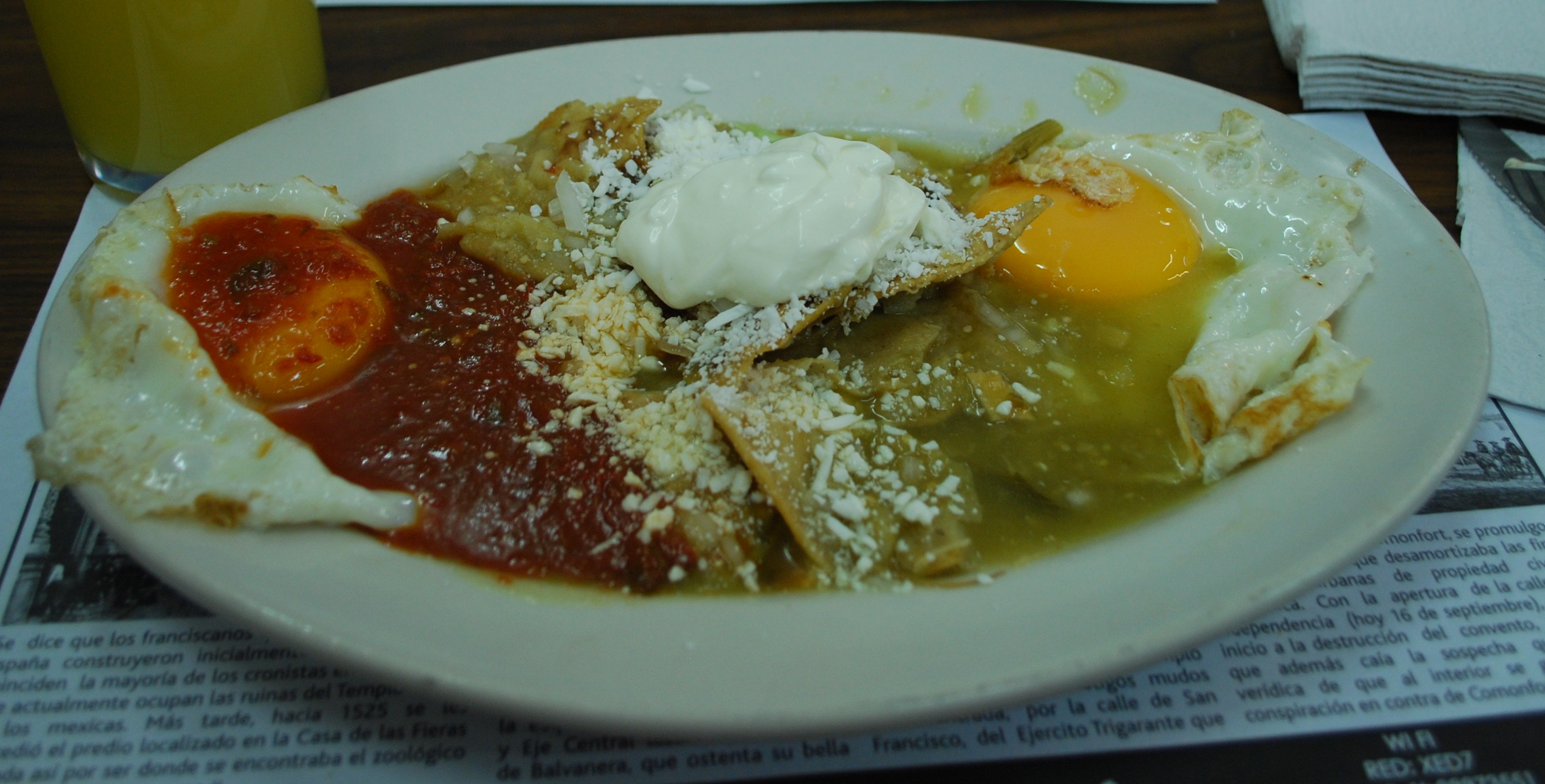
Chilaquiles divorciados refers to using both red and green sauces

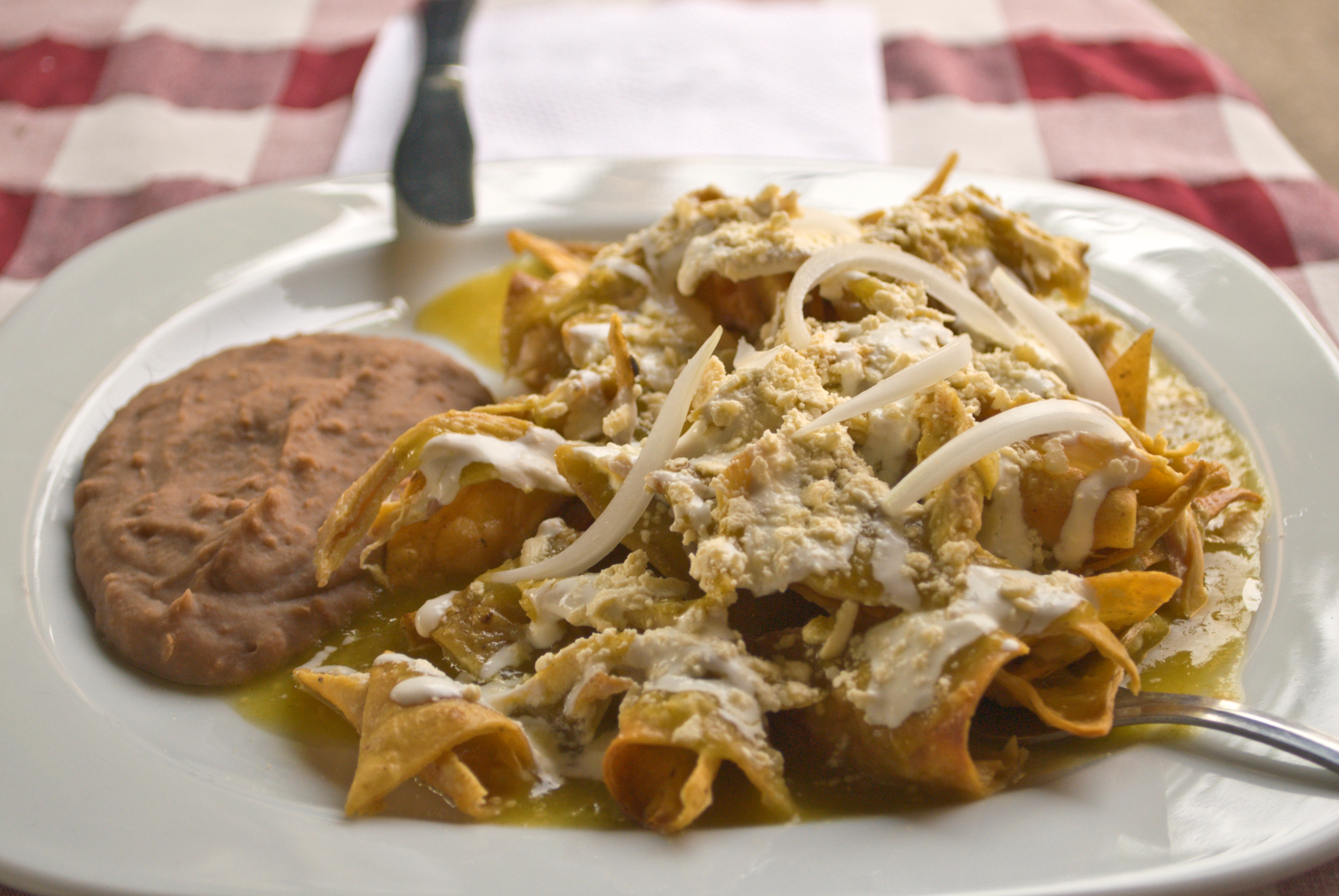
Chilaquiles with refried beans

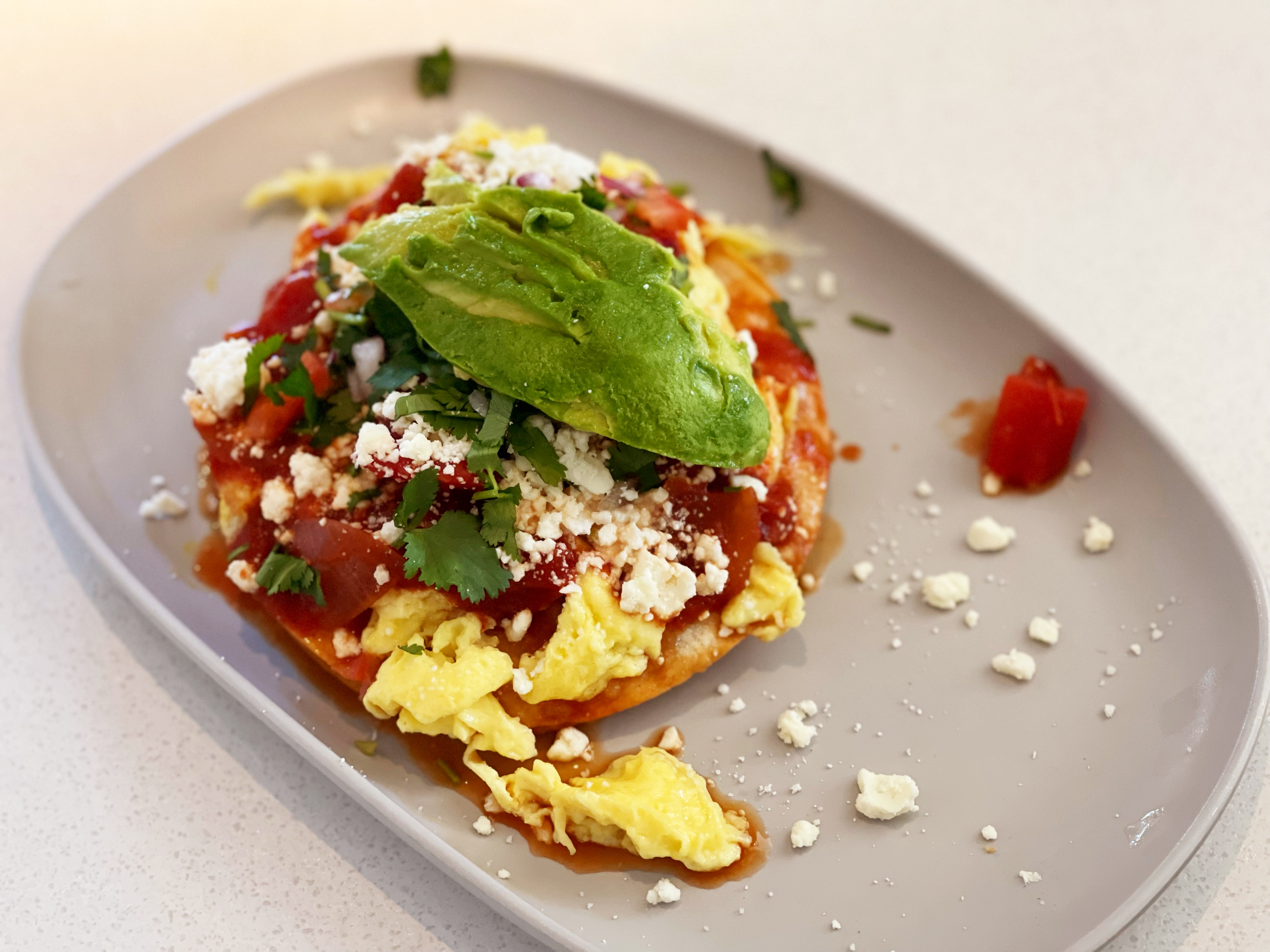
Chilaquiles served in California

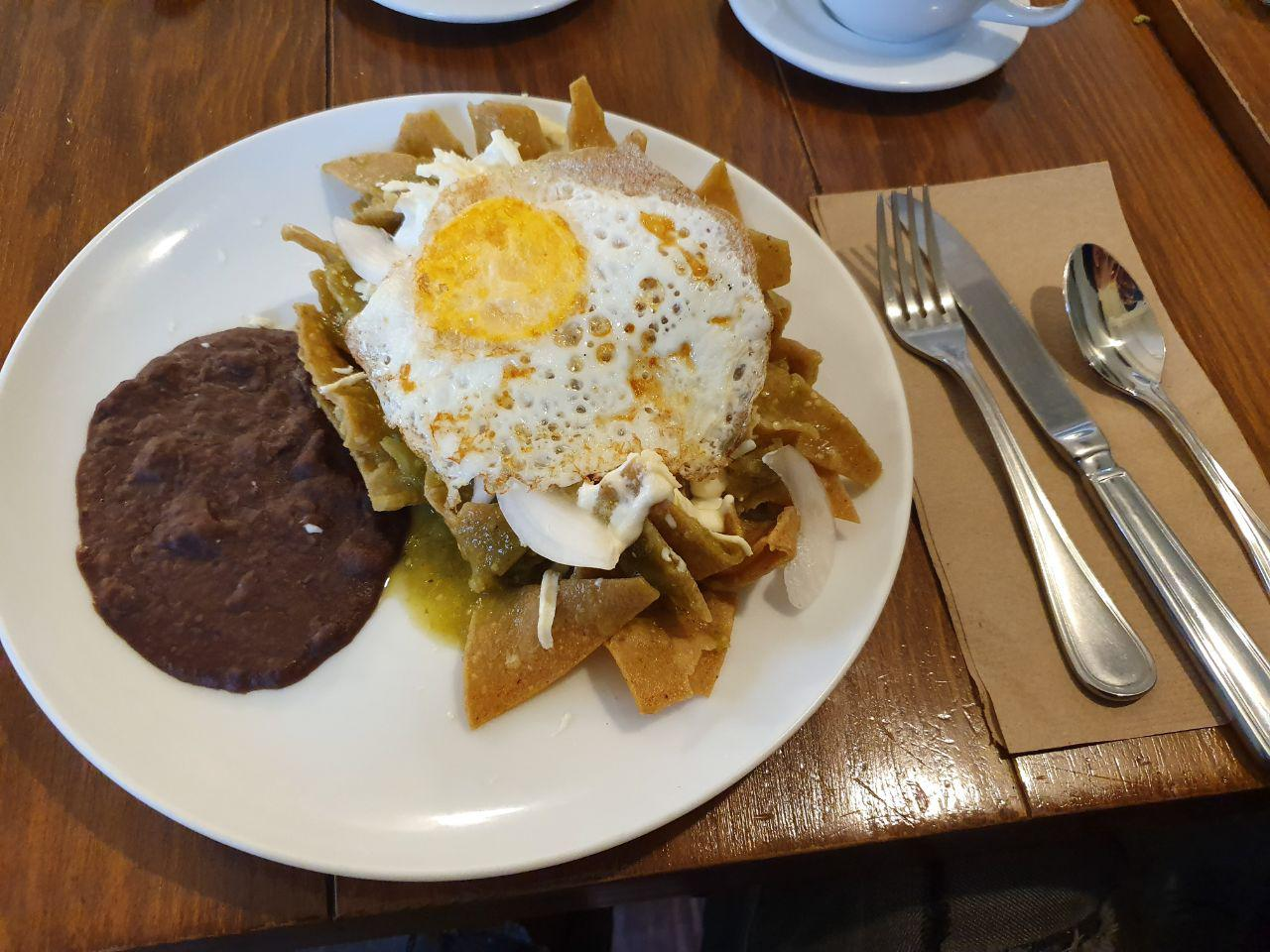
Chilaquiles may be served with minimal salsa applied at the last minute to preserve the crispiness of the tortilla chips

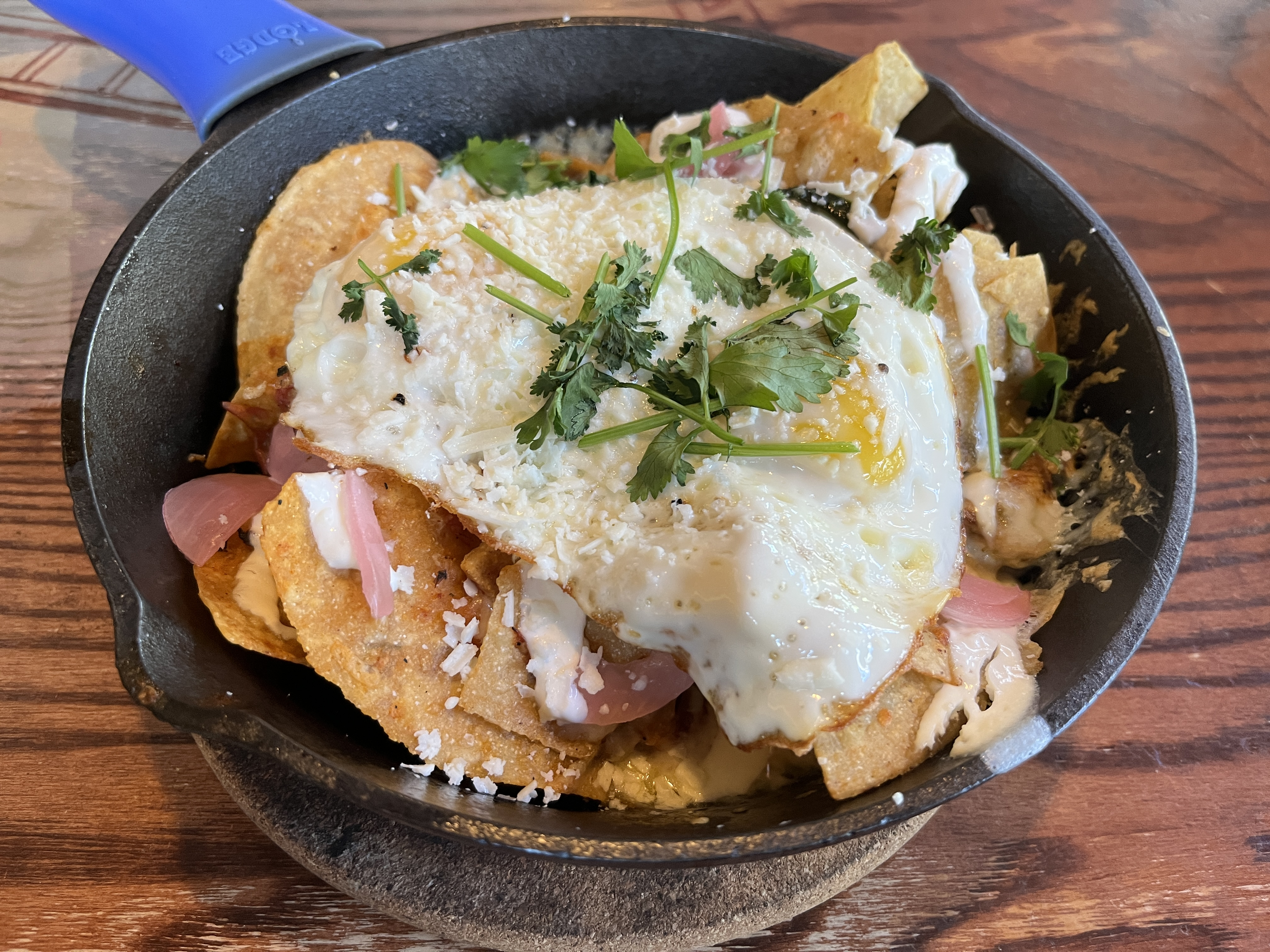
Chilaquiles served in Seattle

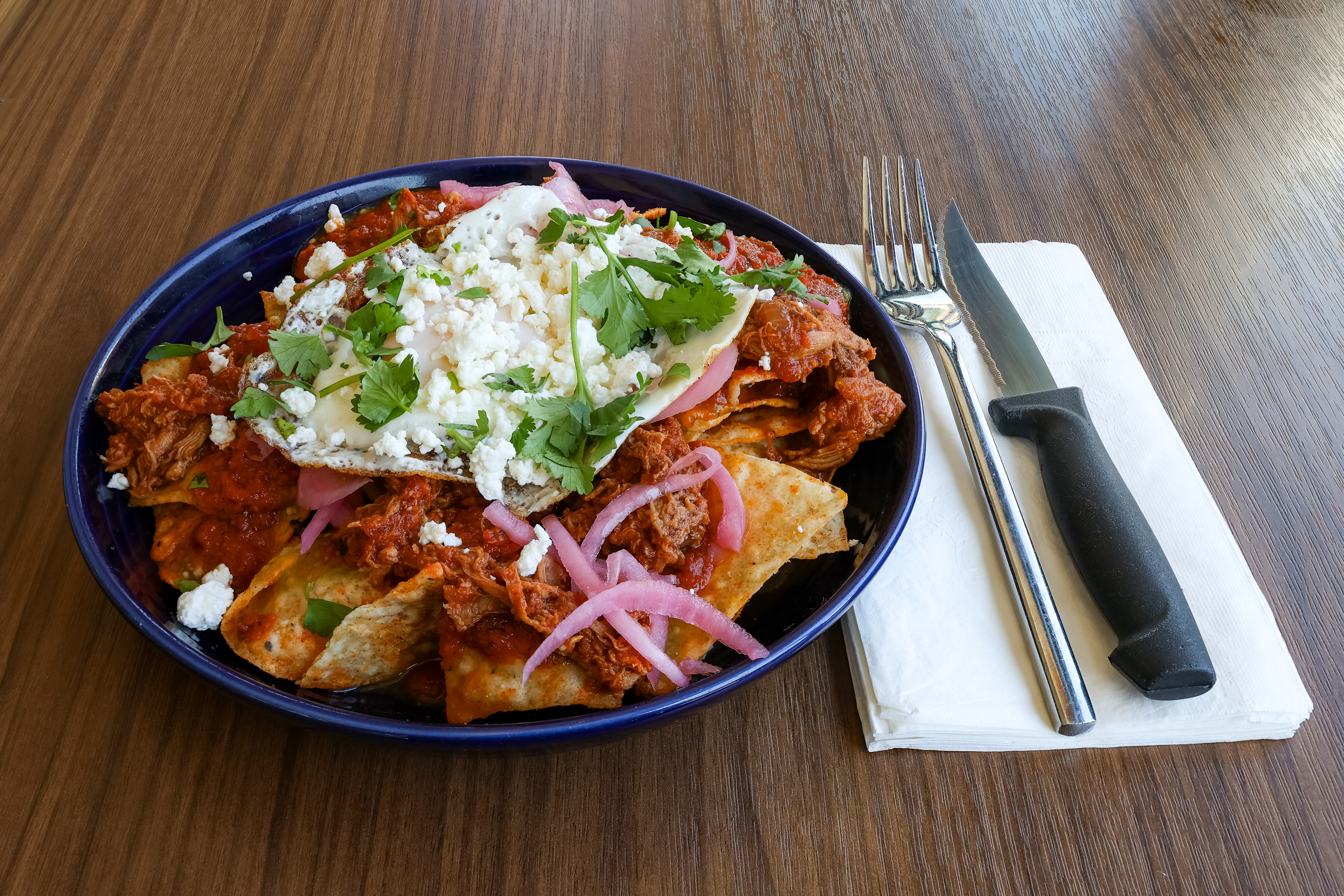
Chilaquiles served in Windsor, Ontario

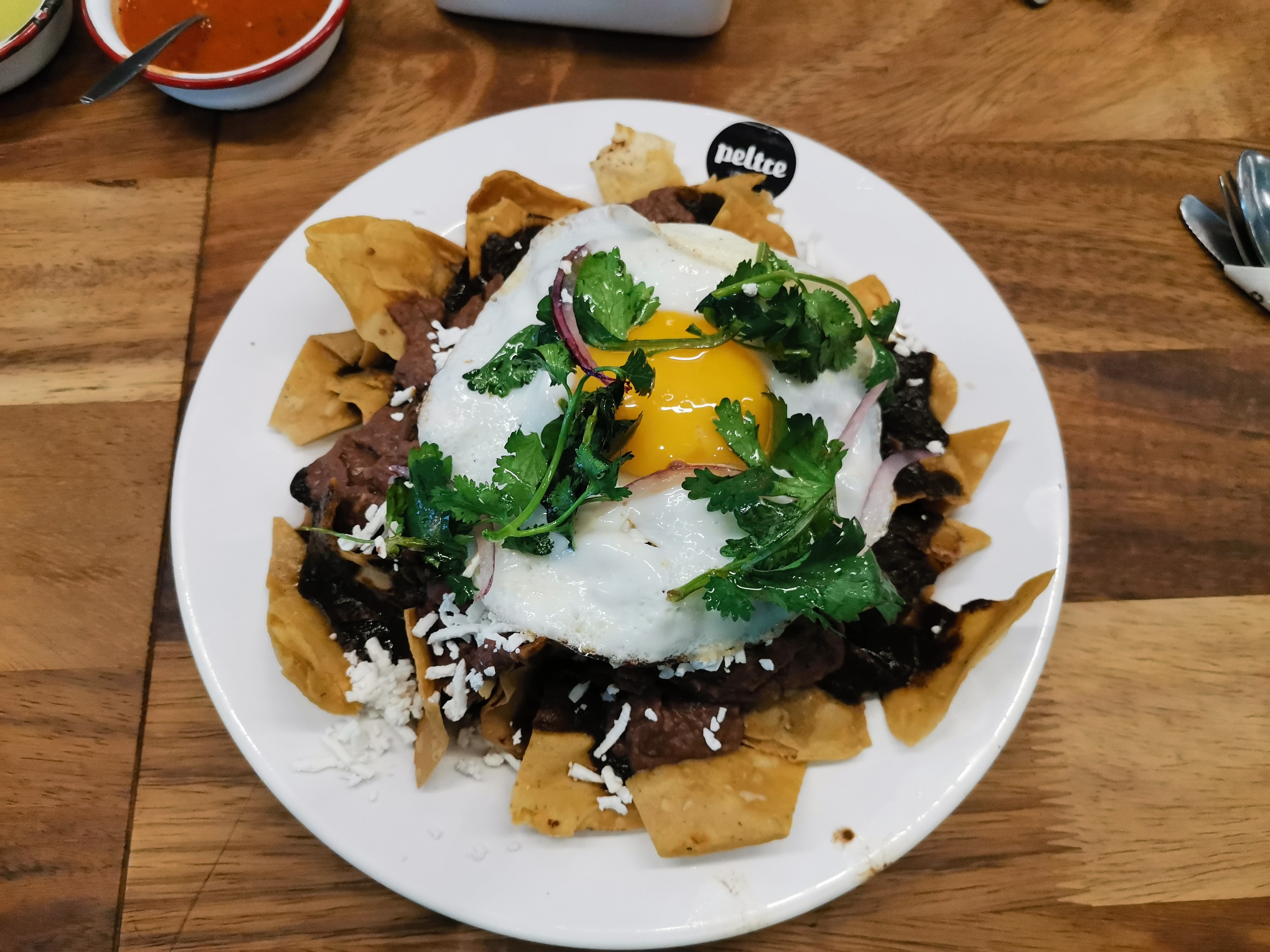
Chilaquiles negros uses black beans

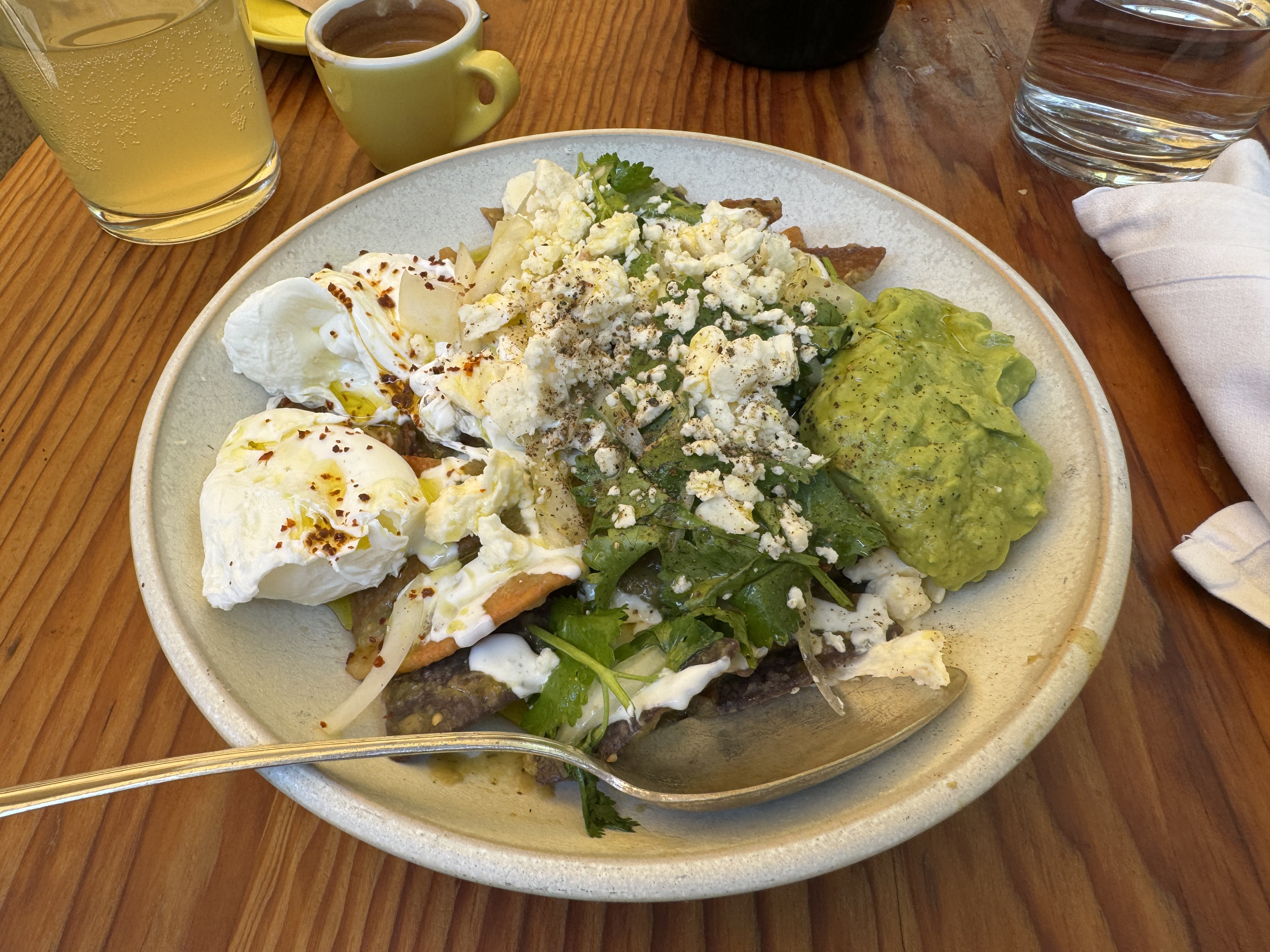
Chilaquiles served in California

== See also ==
- List of Mexican dishes
- List of brunch foods
- List of tortilla-based dishes
- Migas
