= Enchilada =

Corn tortilla rolled around a filling and covered with a sauce

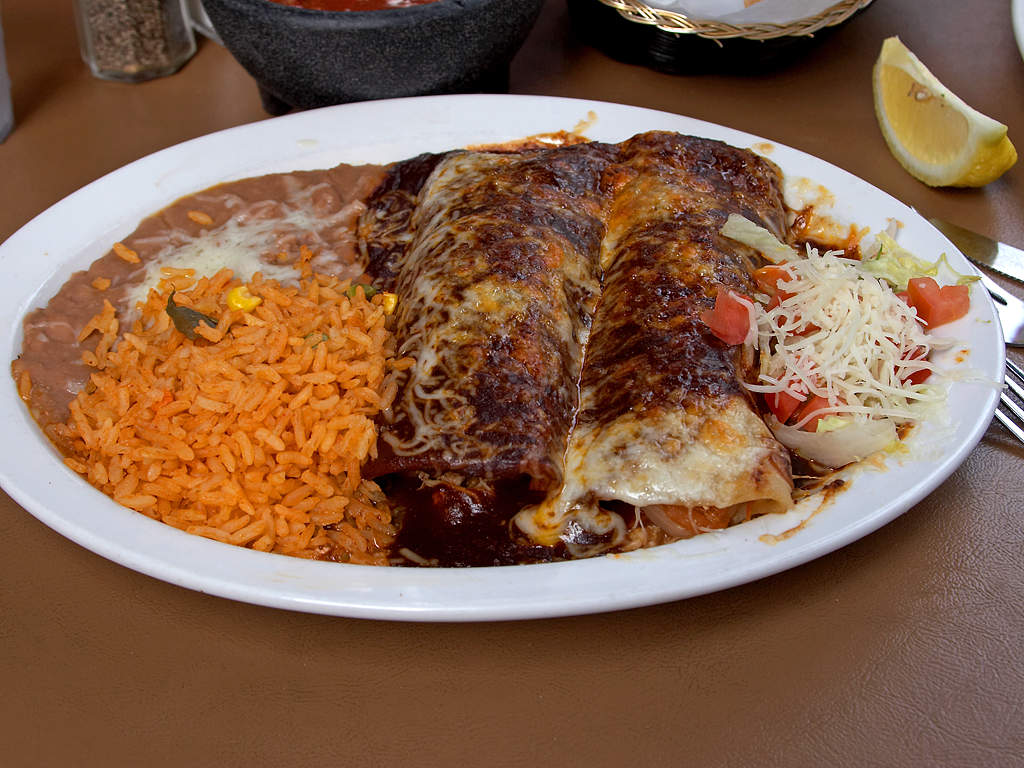
- Enchiladas with mole, served with refried beans and Spanish rice
- Place of origin: Mexico
- Main ingredients: Tortillas, chili pepper sauce, meat

An enchilada (/ˌɛntʃɪˈlɑːdə/, Spanish: [entʃiˈlaða]) is a Mexican dish consisting of a corn tortilla rolled around a filling and covered with a savory sauce. Enchiladas can be filled with various ingredients, including meats, cheese, beans, potatoes, vegetables, or combinations. Enchilada sauces include chili-based sauces, such as salsa roja, various moles, tomato-based sauces, such as salsa verde, or cheese-based sauces, such as chile con queso.

== Etymology ==
The Royal Spanish Academy defines the word enchilada, as used in Mexico, as a rolled maize tortilla stuffed with meat and covered with a tomato and chili sauce. Enchilada is the past participle of the Mexican Spanish enchilar, "to add chili pepper to"; literally, "to season (or decorate) with chili".

== History ==
Enchiladas originated in Mexico, where the practice of rolling tortillas around other food dates back thousands of years. The people living in the lake region of the Valley of Mexico traditionally ate corn tortillas folded or rolled around small fish. Writing at the time of the Spanish conquistadors, Bernal Díaz del Castillo documented a feast enjoyed by Europeans hosted by Hernán Cortés in Coyoacán, which included foods served in corn tortillas. (Note that the native Nahuatl name for the flat corn bread used was tlaxcalli; the Spanish gave it the name tortilla.) The Nahuatl word for enchilada is chīllapītzalli [t͡ʃiːlːapiːˈt͡salːi], which is formed of the Nahuatl word for "chili", chīlli [ˈt͡ʃiːlːi] and the Nahuatl word for "flute", tlapītzalli [t͡ɬapiːˈt͡salːi]. In the 19th century, as Mexican cuisine was being memorialized, enchiladas were mentioned in the first Mexican cookbook, El cocinero mexicano ("The Mexican Chef"), published in 1831, and in Mariano Galvan Rivera's Diccionario de Cocina, published in 1845.

== Varieties ==
In their original form as Mexican street food, enchiladas were simply corn tortillas dipped in chili sauce and eaten without fillings. There are now many varieties, which are distinguished primarily by their sauces, fillings and, in one instance, by their form. Various adjectives may be used to describe the recipe content or origin, e.g. enchilada tapatia would be a recipe from Jalisco.

Varieties include:

- Enchiladas con chile rojo (with red chile) is a traditional red enchilada sauce, meat, composed of dried red chili peppers soaked and ground into a sauce with other seasonings, Chile Colorado sauce adds a tomato base.
- Enchiladas con mole, instead of chili sauce, are served with mole, and are also known as enmoladas.
- Enchiladas placeras are Michoacán plaza-style, made with vegetables and poultry.
- Enchiladas poblanas are soft corn tortillas filled with chicken and poblano peppers, topped with oaxaca cheese.
- Enchiladas potosinas originate from San Luis Potosi, Mexico, and are made with cheese-filled, chili-spiced masa.
- Enchiladas San Miguel are San Miguel de Allende-style enchiladas flavored with guajillo chilies by searing the flavor into the tortillas in a frying pan.

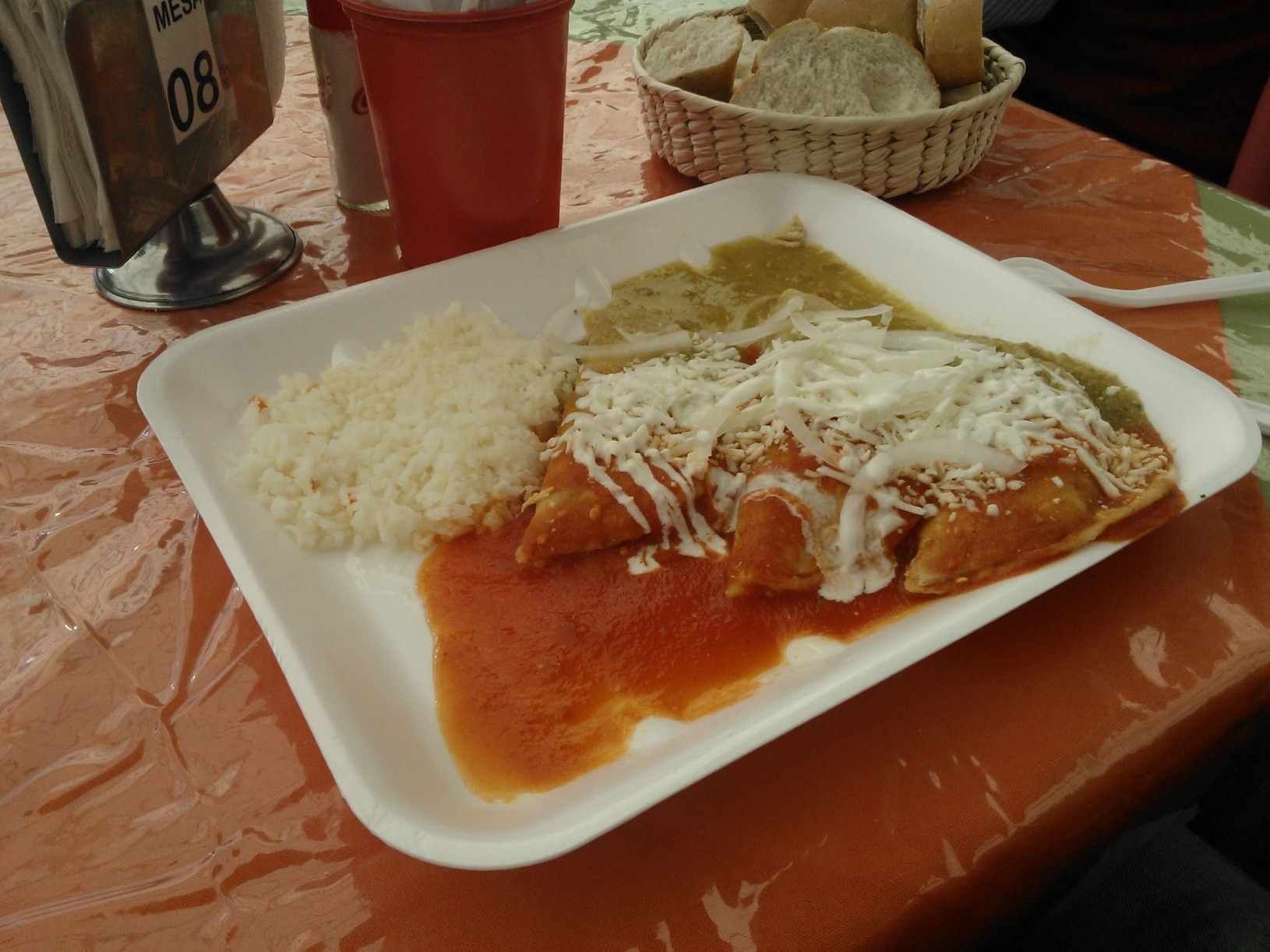
Enchiladas with red and green sauces

- Enchiladas suizas (Swiss-style) are topped with a milk- or cream-based white sauce such as béchamel. This appellation is derived from Swiss immigrants to Mexico who established dairies to produce cream and cheese.
- Enfrijoladas are topped with refried beans rather than chili sauce; their name comes from frijol, meaning "bean".
- Entomatadas are made with tomato sauce instead of chili sauce.
- Enchiladas montadas (stacked enchiladas) are a New Mexico variation in which corn tortillas are fried flat until softened (but not tough) then stacked with red or green sauce, chopped onion and shredded cheese between the layers and on top of the stack. Ground beef or chicken can be added to the filling. The stack is often topped (montada) with a fried egg. Shredded lettuce and black olive slices may be added as a garnish.
- Enchiladas verdes are sauced with salsa verde and typically made with white corn tortillas, filled with poached chicken breasts and topped with queso fresco.
- Enjococadas are baked corn tortillas covered in jocoque and filled with queso panela and chile poblano.

== Fillings, toppings and garnishes ==
Fillings include meat (e.g. beef, poultry, pork, seafood) or cheese, potatoes, vegetables, beans, tofu, and any combination thereof. Enchiladas are commonly topped or garnished with cheese, sour cream, lettuce, olives, chopped onions, chili peppers, sliced avocado, and salsa, or fresh cilantro.

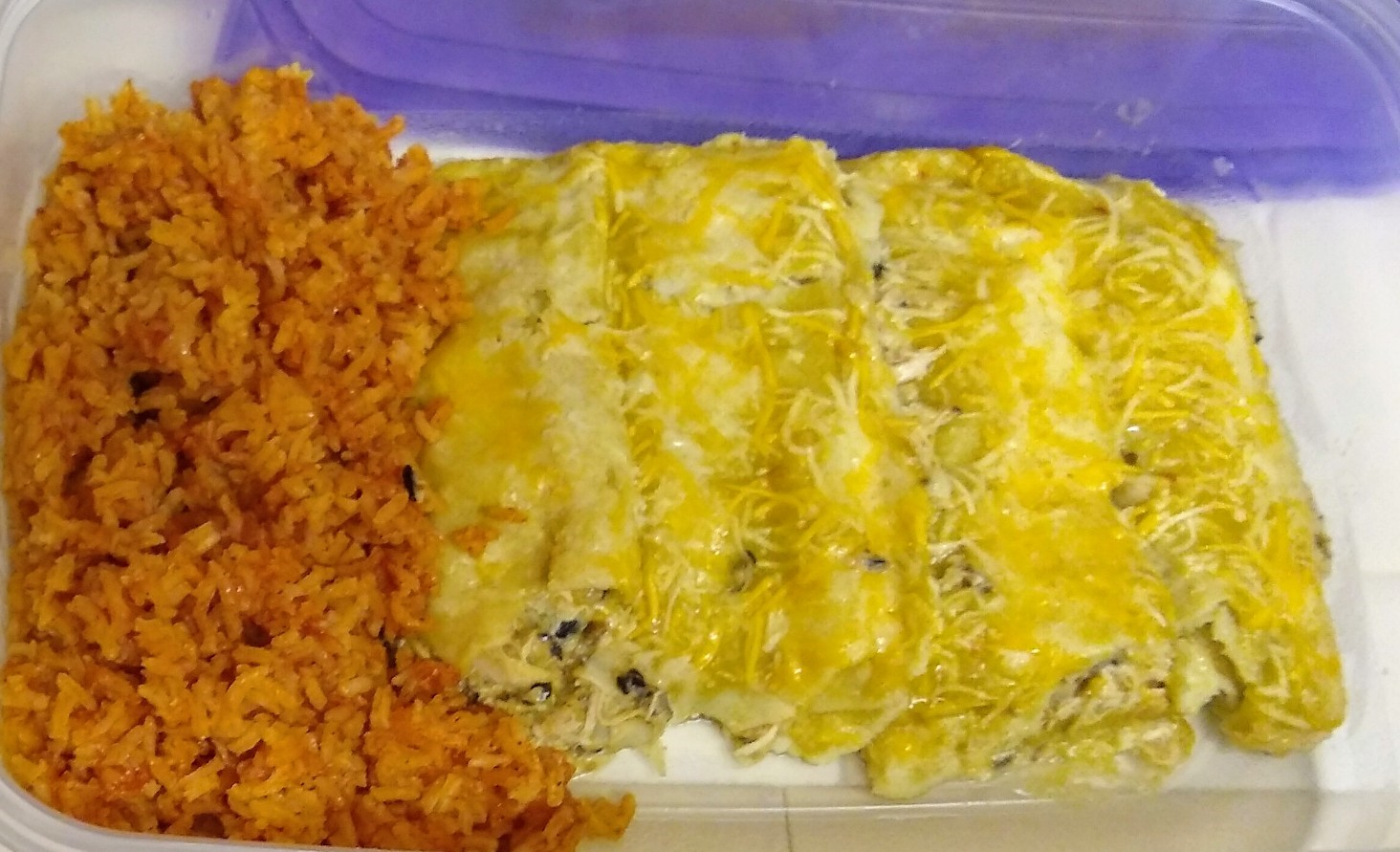
Enchiladas

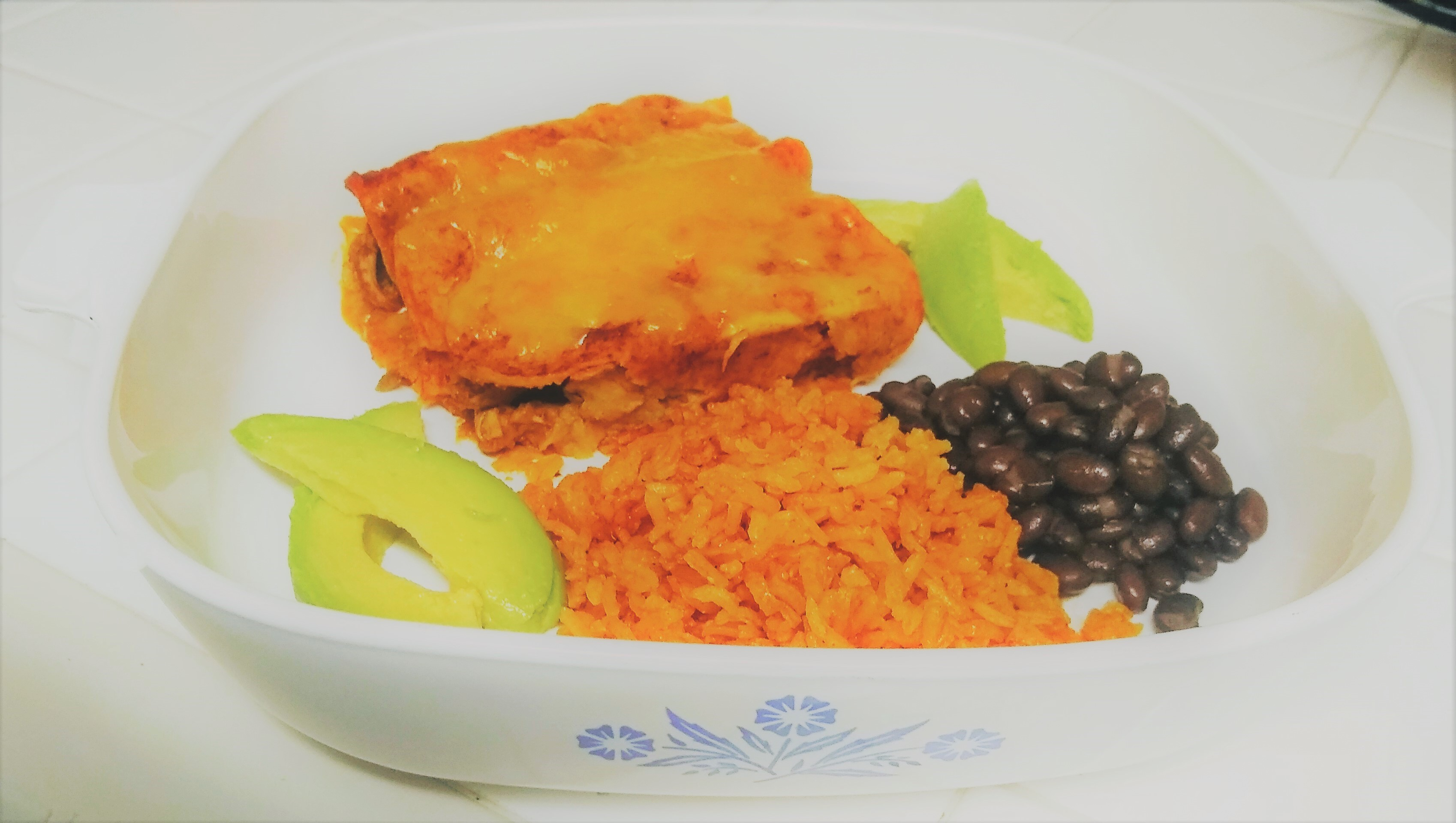
Chicken enchiladas with red sauce, red rice, black beans, and avocado

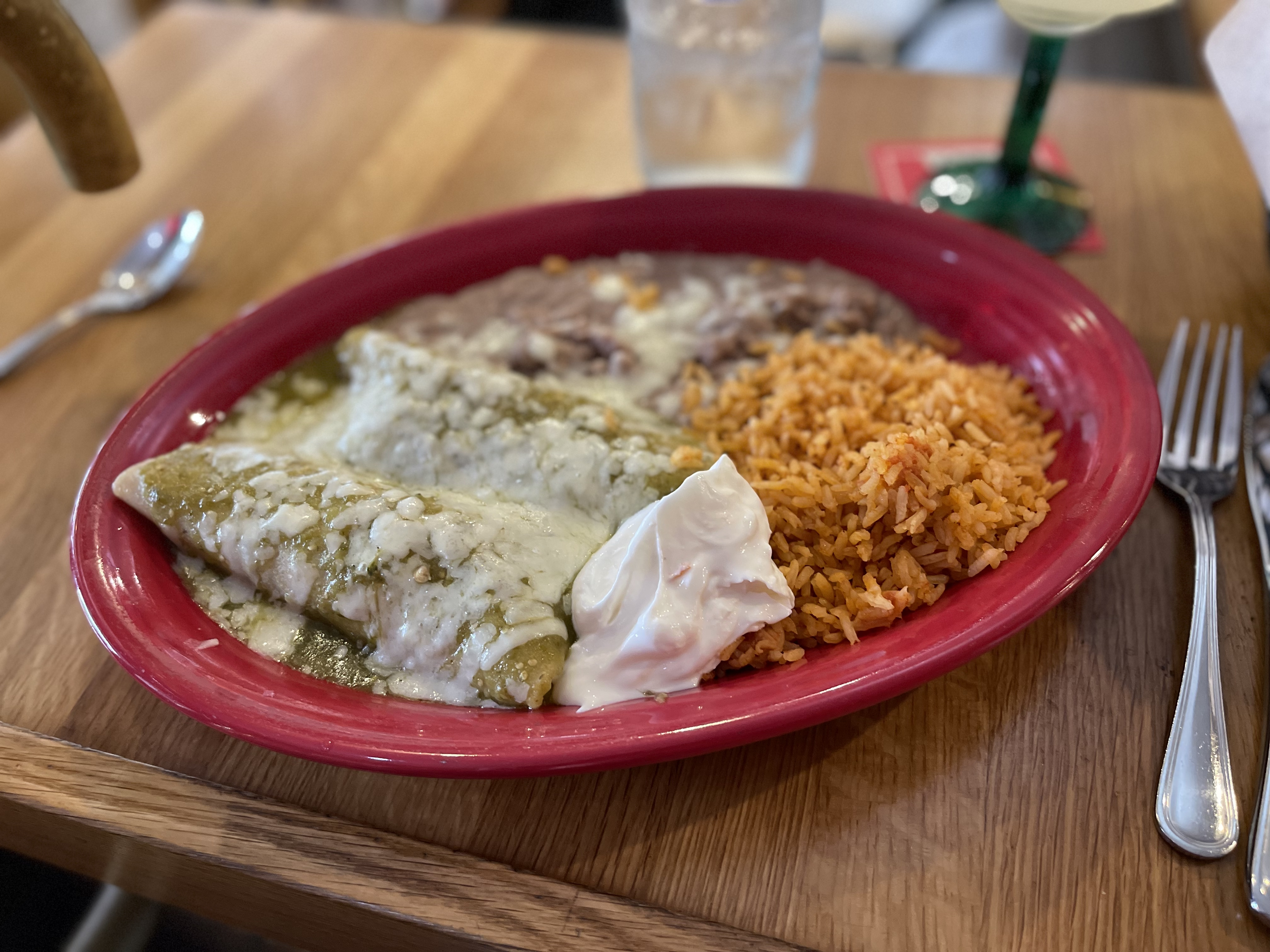
Enchiladas suizas

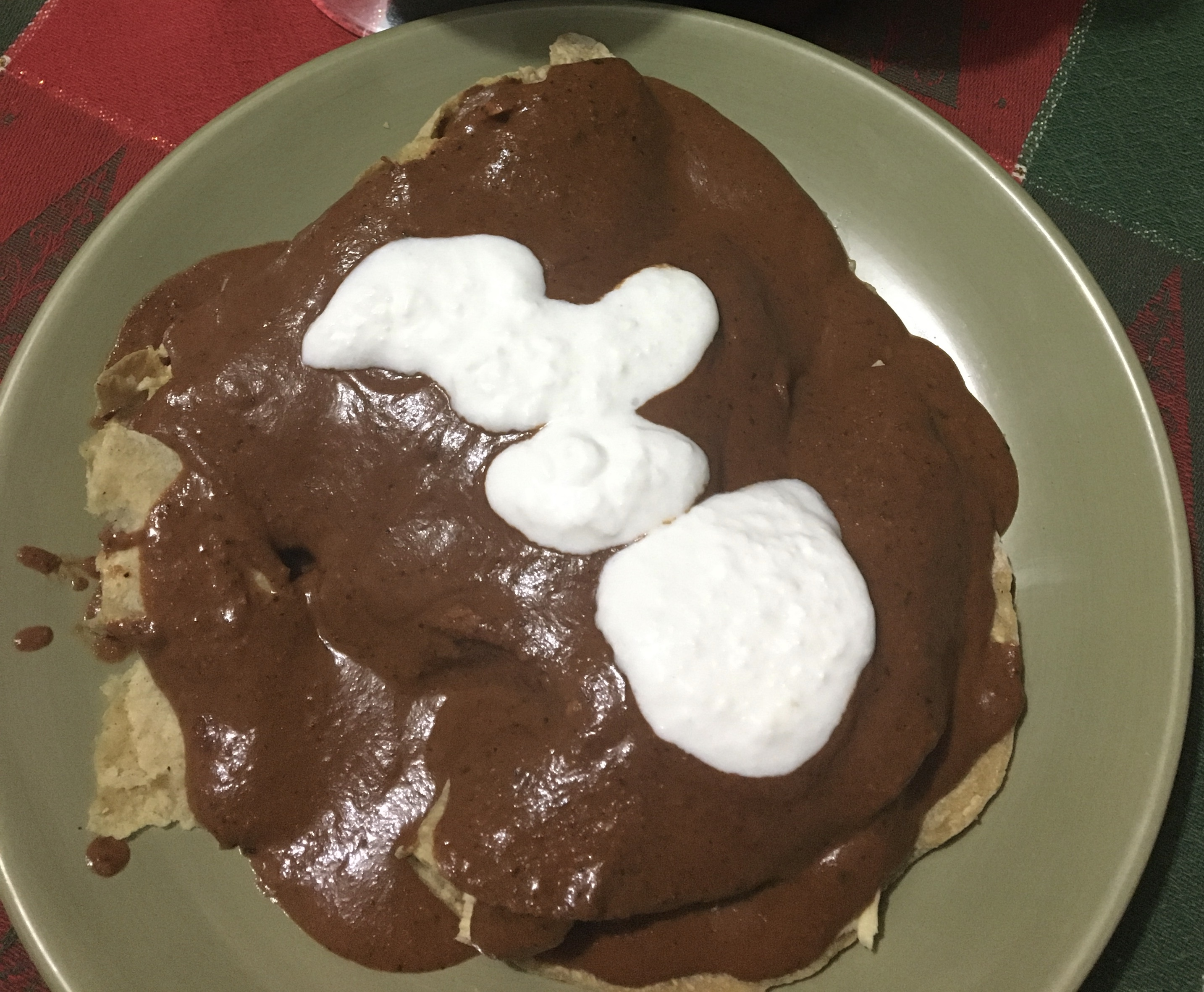
Enchiladas de mole caseras

== Outside of Mexico ==
=== Costa Rica ===
In Costa Rica, the enchilada is a common, small, spicy pastry made with puff pastry and filled with diced potatoes spiced with a common variation of Tabasco sauce or other similar sauces. Other variations include fillings made of spicy chicken or minced meat.

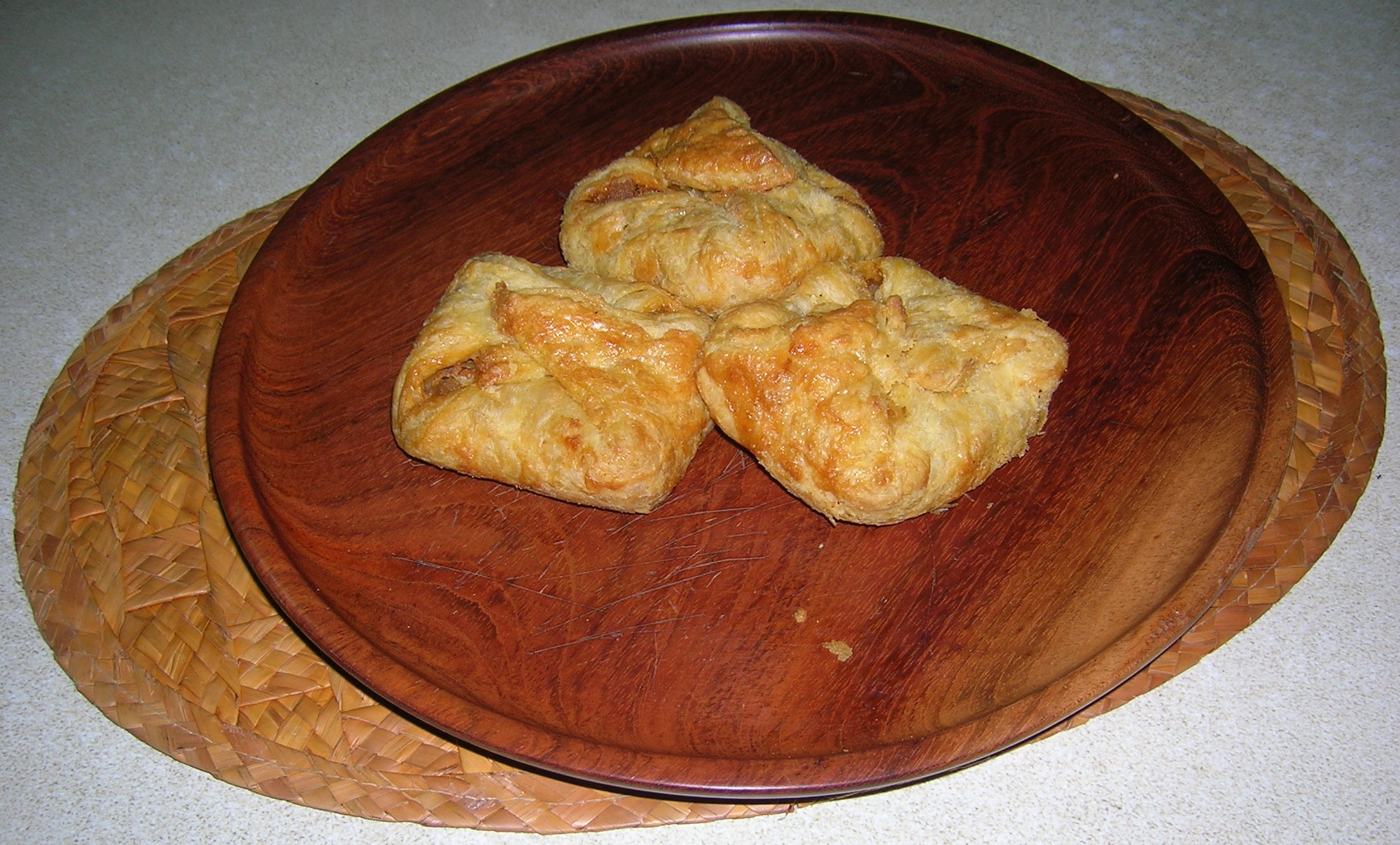
Three enchiladas from Cartago, Costa Rica

=== Honduras ===
In Honduras, enchiladas look and taste very different from those in Mexico; they are not corn tortillas rolled around a filling, but instead are flat, fried, corn tortillas topped with ground beef, salad toppings (usually consisting of cabbage and tomato slices), a tomato sauce (often ketchup blended with butter and other spices such as cumin), and crumbled or shredded cheese. They look and taste much like what many people call a tostada.

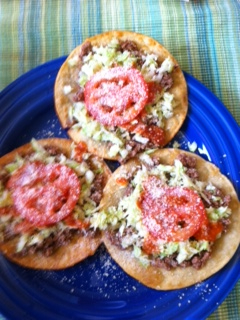
Homestyle Honduran enchiladas

=== Nicaragua ===
In Nicaragua, enchiladas are different from the other ones in Central America and resemble those in Mexico; they are corn tortillas filled with a mixture of ground beef and rice with chili, they are then folded and covered in egg batter and deep fried. It is commonly served with a cabbage and tomato salad (either pickled salad or in cream and tomato sauce). The Nicaraguan enchilada resembles the empanada of other countries.

=== Guatemala ===
In Guatemala, enchiladas look much like Honduran enchiladas but the recipe is different. This version most commonly begins with a flat fried corn tortilla topped with a leaf of fresh lettuce, then a layer of 'picado de carne,' which includes meat (generally ground beef, shredded chicken, or pork) and diced vegetables (carrot, potato, onion, celery, green bean, peas, red bell pepper, garlic, bay leaf, seasoned with salt and black pepper). The next layer in the recipe is the 'curtido' layer which includes more vegetables (cabbage, beets, onions, and carrots). After this is two or three pieces of sliced hard-boiled egg, then thin sliced white onion, and finally a drizzle of mild red salsa. The dish is topped with either queso seco or queso fresco and garnished with cilantro.

== See also ==
- Cannelloni
- Empalme
- Enchirito
- Hortobágyi palacsinta
- Mexican cuisine
- New Mexican cuisine
- Tex-Mex cuisine
- "Wet" burrito
- List of Mexican dishes
