= General Zuazua =

General Zuazua Municipality
- Municipality and town
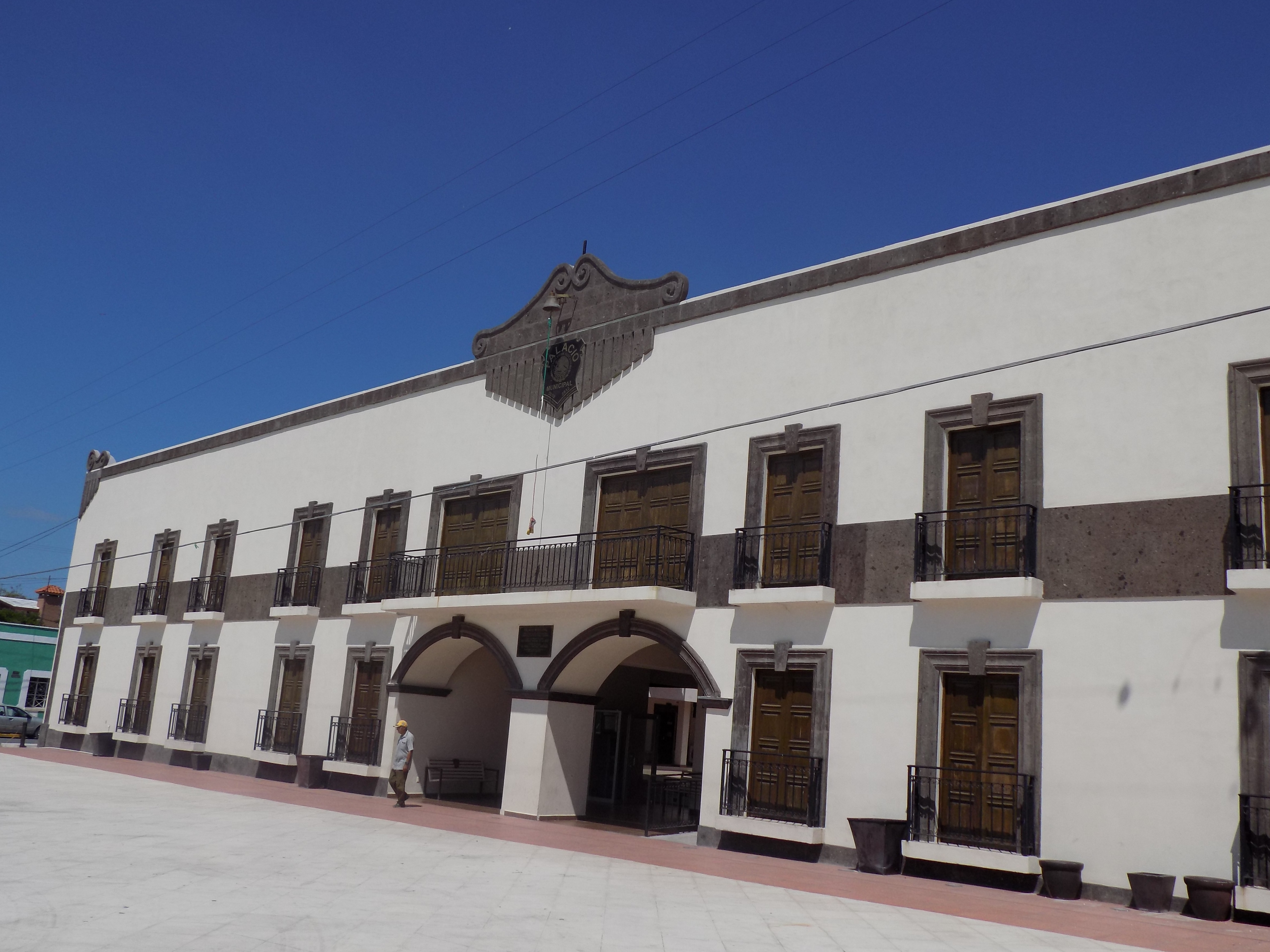
- Municipal Palace

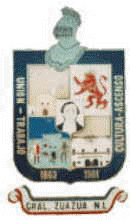
- Coat of arms

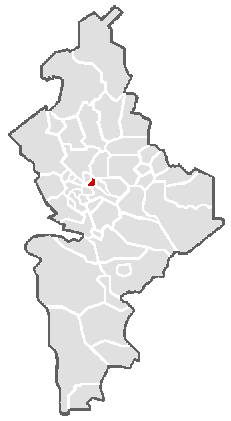
- Coordinates: 25°54′N 100°07′W
- Founded: 1630

Government
  - Type: Municipality
  - Federal electoral district: Nuevo León's 14th

Area
  - Municipality: 184.5 km^{2} (71.2 sq mi)
  - Town: 5.89 km^{2} (2.27 sq mi)

Population (2020 census)
  - Municipality: 102,149
  - Density: 553.7/km^{2} (1,434/sq mi)
  - Town: 9,934
  - Town density: 1,690/km^{2} (4,370/sq mi)
- Time zone: UTC-6 (Zona Centro)
- Website: General Zuazua municipal government

General Zuazua is a municipality and town in the northeastern Mexican state of Nuevo León, it is located in the north-central part of the state, which has been called peripheral region because of its proximity to Monterrey metropolitan area. The municipality is known for its rodeos and for empalmes, a street food that originated in this area.

== Name ==
The name honors General es:Juan Zuazua, who fought in the Reform War (1857–1860).

== Localities ==
Name	Population (2020)	Area
Fraccionamiento Real Palmas	40,259	2.78 km^{2}
Valle de Santa Elena	22,496	1.79 km^{2}
Hacienda San Pedro	10,831	1.33 km^{2}
General Zuazua	9,934	5.89 km^{2}
Villas de Alcalá	9,046	0.72 km^{2}
Paseos del Roble	7,885	0.89 km^{2}

== Geography ==
The municipality is located in the historic region of the Carrizal Valley which used to be part of the Valle de las Salinas of the former New Kingdom of León.

General Zuazua Municipality is bordered by the municipalities of Cienega de Flores to the west and northwest, Salinas Victoria to the west, Higueras to the north, Marín to the east, and Apodaca and Pesquería to the south.

== History ==
It was founded in 1630 as the Hacienda de Abajo by an expedition of Spanish settlers led by Spanish captain Enrique Gutiérrez de Lara, in a region known as Valle del Carizal or Carrizal Valley, within the jurisdiction of the Salinas Valley or Valle de las Salinas, the Hacienda de Abajo changed its name in 1650 as the Hacienda Santa Elena, in honor of Saint Helena.

In 1807, the Carrizal Valley was separated from the Salinas Valley. Santa Helena during the Spanish colonial period had exhaustive battles against the nomadic Native Americans who were exterminated because of their cruelty and frequent raids against the Spanish settlements in the region, primarily perpetuated by the Cuanales and Aiguales, both of Coahuiltecan origin who inhabited the Salinas Valley. In the early years of the 19th century the Cuanales and Aiguales were almost extinct but the war still continued with the subsequent Comanche invasions from Texas to sack towns, mostly in northern Nuevo León during much of the 19th century, by 1840, one of the most intense battles took place in Santa Helena, between the Comanche and the New Leonese Army led by general Mariano Arista, who achieved important victories against them. Arista's army stayed in the hacienda of San Pedro after the battle. On March 2, 1863 the Nuevo León state congress issued a decree by then governor of the state, Santiago Vidaurri, in which the hacienda of Santa Helena was separated from the Carrizal Valley, created as municipality and renamed as the General Zuazua village, in honor of General Juan Zuazua Esparza, hero of the war of reform.

In 1875, the Santa Elena church was finally built and by 1979 was restored, bringing it back its original architecture. Today, it is one of the main tourist attractions of the town, along with the hacienda of San Pedro.
