= Corn burrito =

Ventura Mexican-style dish made of corn tortilla filled with refried beans

- Type: Burrito
- Place of origin: United States
- Region or state: Ventura County, California
- Main ingredients: Tortillas, refried beans, hot sauce, cheese

A corn burrito is a Mexican-style dish consisting of a small rolled-up corn tortilla filled with refried beans. The filled tortilla is typically deep-fried, then topped with hot sauce and cheese. A corn burrito is essentially the same thing as a taquito, the difference being that taquitos are typically filled with meat, whereas a corn burrito is always filled with refried beans.

Corn burritos are usually topped with cheese, lightly salted, and served or topped with a mild red sauce or red salsa. Many local Ventura County restaurants have individual variances in recipes.
