= Tortilla warmer =

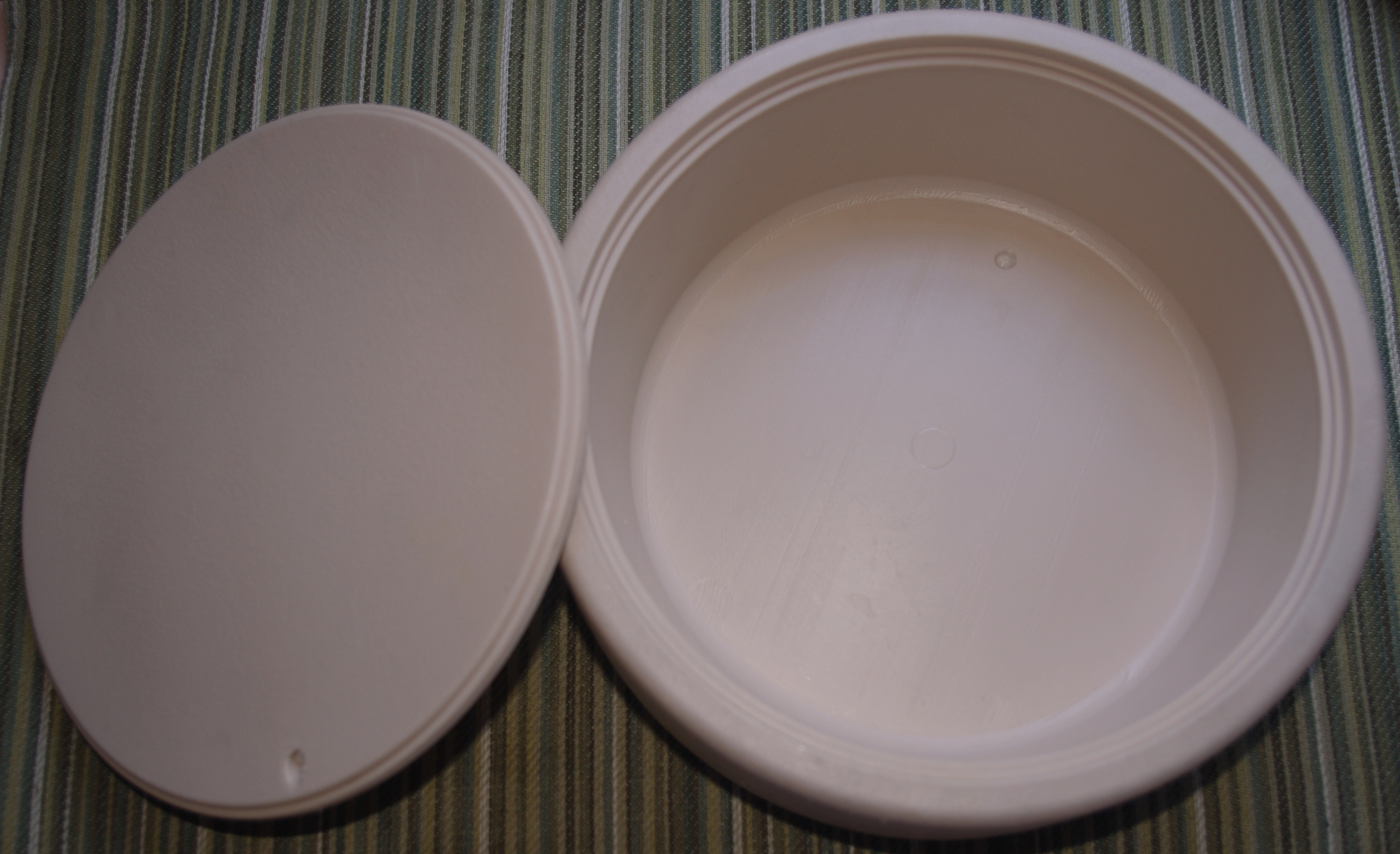
A plastic tortilla warmer

A tortillero is a round shaped container which helps keep tortillas warm during a meal. Warm tortillas are placed in the warmer, which is often lined with a cloth or paper napkin. Tortilla warmers are made of woven natural fibers, terra cotta, plastic, or styrofoam
