= Hacienda San Pedro =

- General Zuazua, Nuevo León
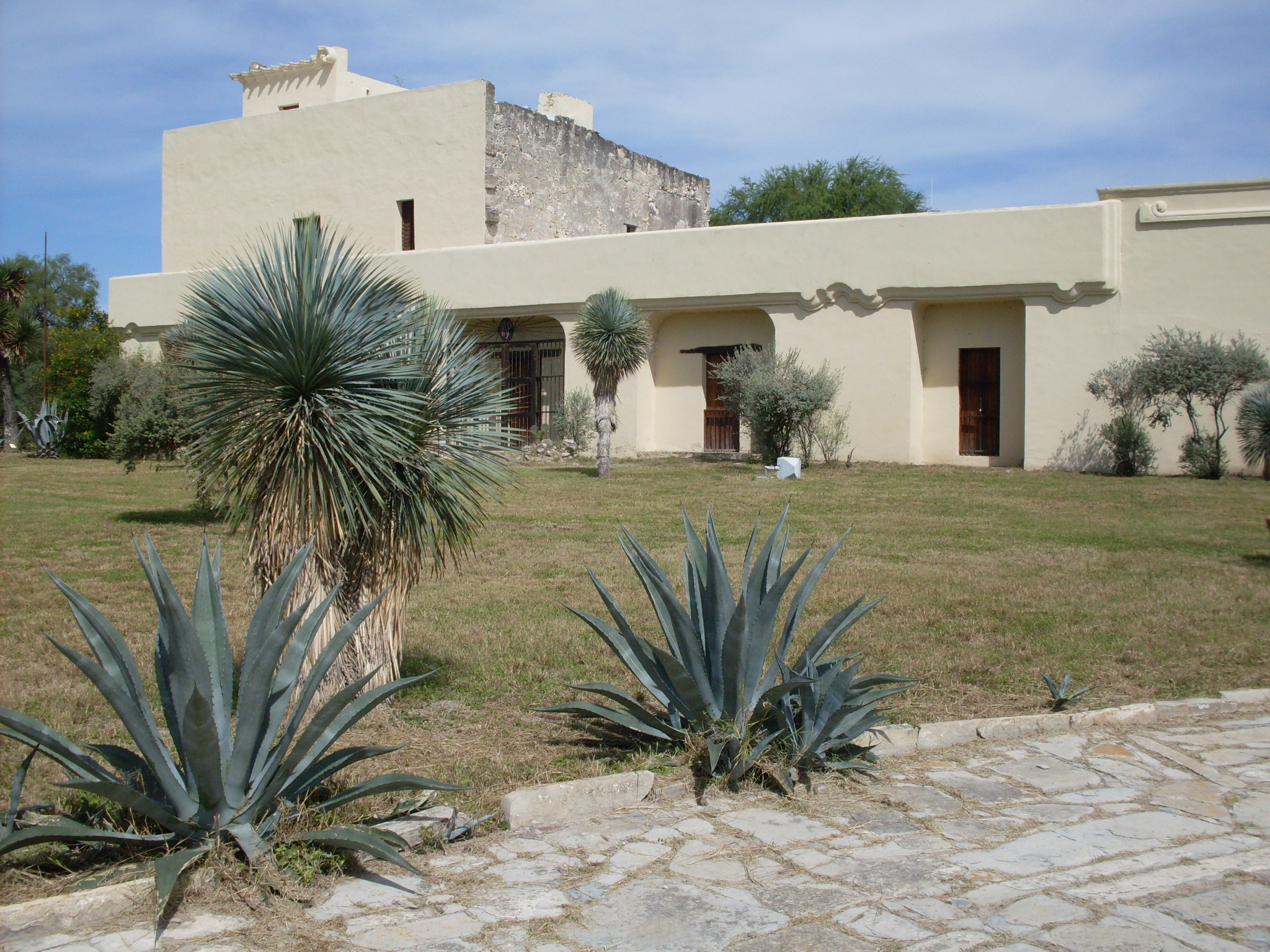

Site information
- Type: Fort, Hacienda
- Open to the public: Yes

Site history
- Events: Comanche War

Hacienda San Pedro is a historic landmark located in the municipality of General Zuazua, in the northeastern Mexican state of Nuevo León, the site served as a hacienda and a fort against Native American raids in the region.

== History ==
The oldest property information related to Hacienda San Pedro date from 1666, it was owned by several Spanish families, its history is bound to Valle de las Salinas (Salinas Valley) colonization in the former New Kingdom of León. The founder and first owner of this hacienda was Captain Alonso de Treviño. In 1814 it was transferred to the Gutiérrez de Lara family, at the time it comprised a huge extension of the Valle de las Salinas. Its construction lasted 31 years, and was finally finished by 1845. The farmstead central place also was used as a fort; in it General Mariano Arista and his troops spent the night after having a combant against 600 comanches on January 23; 1840, besides this event, the site was used as fortress during many those Indian raids during the Comanche War.

== Productive Stage ==
An irrigation ditch from Salinas river was used for watering plots of ground, where people grew corn, sugar cane, grapevine, vegetables and fruit trees;and also raised cattle, goats and sheep. Hacienda San Pedro productive activities finished by 1950, and most of its territory was sold. During three decades this building was at the mercy of loneliness and destruction.

== Restoration ==
In 1984 the Autonomous University of Nuevo León acquired Hacienda San Pedro central place, beginning the rehabilitation works in April 1986.

== Present Time ==
Currently, this building serves as a UANL Cultural Center and museum. It has a service of guide visit, library with books about history of northeastern Mexico, galleries of historic and artistic exposures.
