= Taquito =

Mexican dish

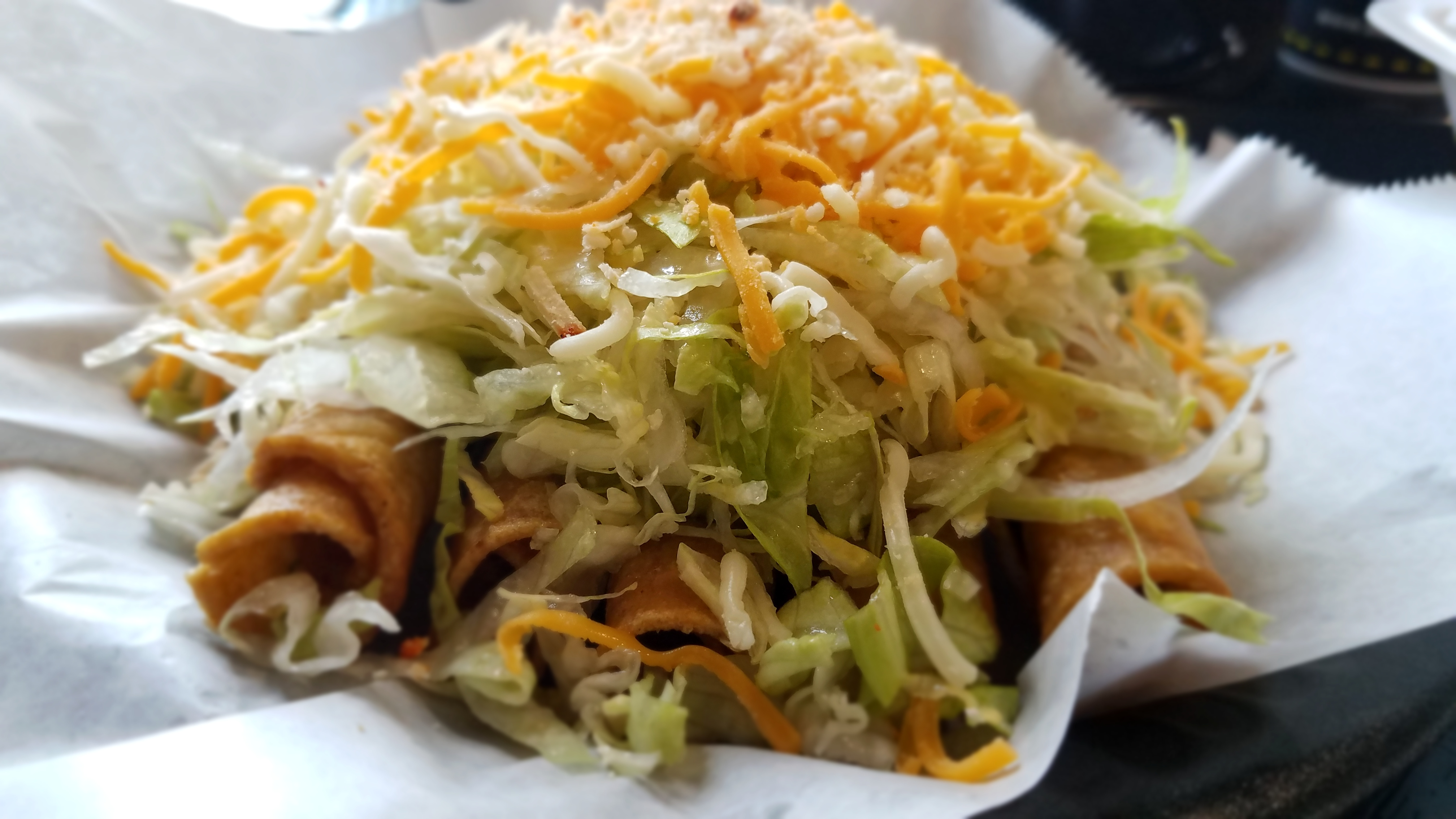
- Little rolled beef tacos with guacamole, lettuce, and cheese
- Alternative names: Rolled taco, flauta, taco dorado
- Place of origin: Mexico
- Main ingredients: Tortillas, beef or chicken

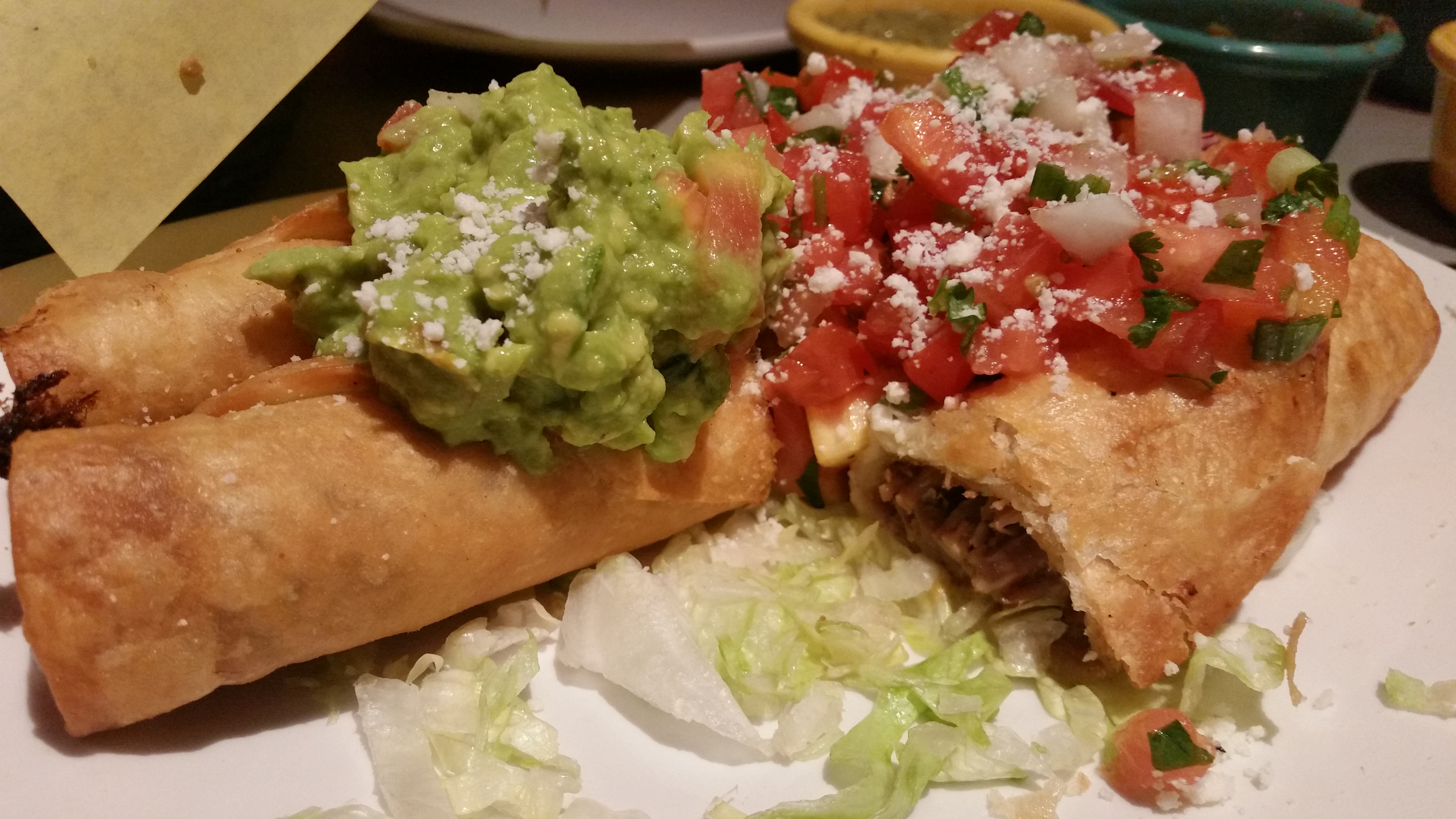
Carnitas flautas with jack cheese, guacamole, salsa fresca, and cotija cheese

Taquitos (Spanish pronunciation: [taˈkito], Spanish for "little taco"), tacos dorados, rolled tacos, or flautas (Spanish pronunciation: [ˈflawta], Spanish for "flute") are a Mexican dish that typically consists of small rolled-up tortillas that contain filling, including beef, cheese or chicken. The filled tortillas are then shallow-fried or deep-fried. The dish is often topped with condiments such as sour cream and guacamole. Corn tortillas are generally used to make taquitos. The dish is more commonly known as flautas when the little tacos are larger than their taquito counterparts, and can be made with either flour or corn tortillas.

== History ==
The taquito or little taco was referred to in the 1917 Preliminary Glossary of New Mexico Spanish, with the word noted as a "Mexicanism" used in New Mexico. The modern definition of a taquito as a rolled-tortilla dish was given in 1929 in a book of stories of Mexican people in the United States aimed at a youth audience, where the dish was noted as a particularly popular offering of railroad station vendors. Taquitos were referred to, without definition, in a 1932 issue of the Los Angeles School Journal.

Two Southern Californian restaurants are often given credit for their roles in the early development of the taquito. Cielito Lindo was founded by Aurora Guerrero in 1934 and located on Olvera Street in Los Angeles. Guerrero's daughter used her taquito recipe in opening chain restaurants in Los Angeles, and soon competitors were selling similar dishes. In San Diego, what would become El Indio Mexican Restaurant began selling taquitos during World War II, when tortilla factory owner Ralph Pesqueira Sr. was asked by workers at the Consolidated Aircraft Company factory across the street for a portable lunch item. Pesqueira, who used a recipe developed by his Mexican grandmother, claimed credit for introducing the word "taquito" to the dish.

Taquitos were among the early Mexican food items developed as a frozen food, with Van de Kamp's introducing a successful frozen taquito offering by 1976. The United States government has determined that taquitos must contain at least 15% meat.

Crispy fried taquitos that are sold in Mexico are often called tacos dorados ("golden tacos") or flautas. Typical toppings and sides include cabbage, crema (Mexican sour cream), guacamole, green chili or red chili salsa and crumbled Mexican cheese such as queso fresco. "Taquitos" in the Mexican border cities of Tijuana and Mexicali refer to small tacos sold in stands, rather than the rolled taco dish.

== See also ==
- Burrito
- List of Mexican dishes
- List of stuffed dishes
- List of tortilla-based dishes
- Taco
