= Empalme (food) =

Mexico originated food

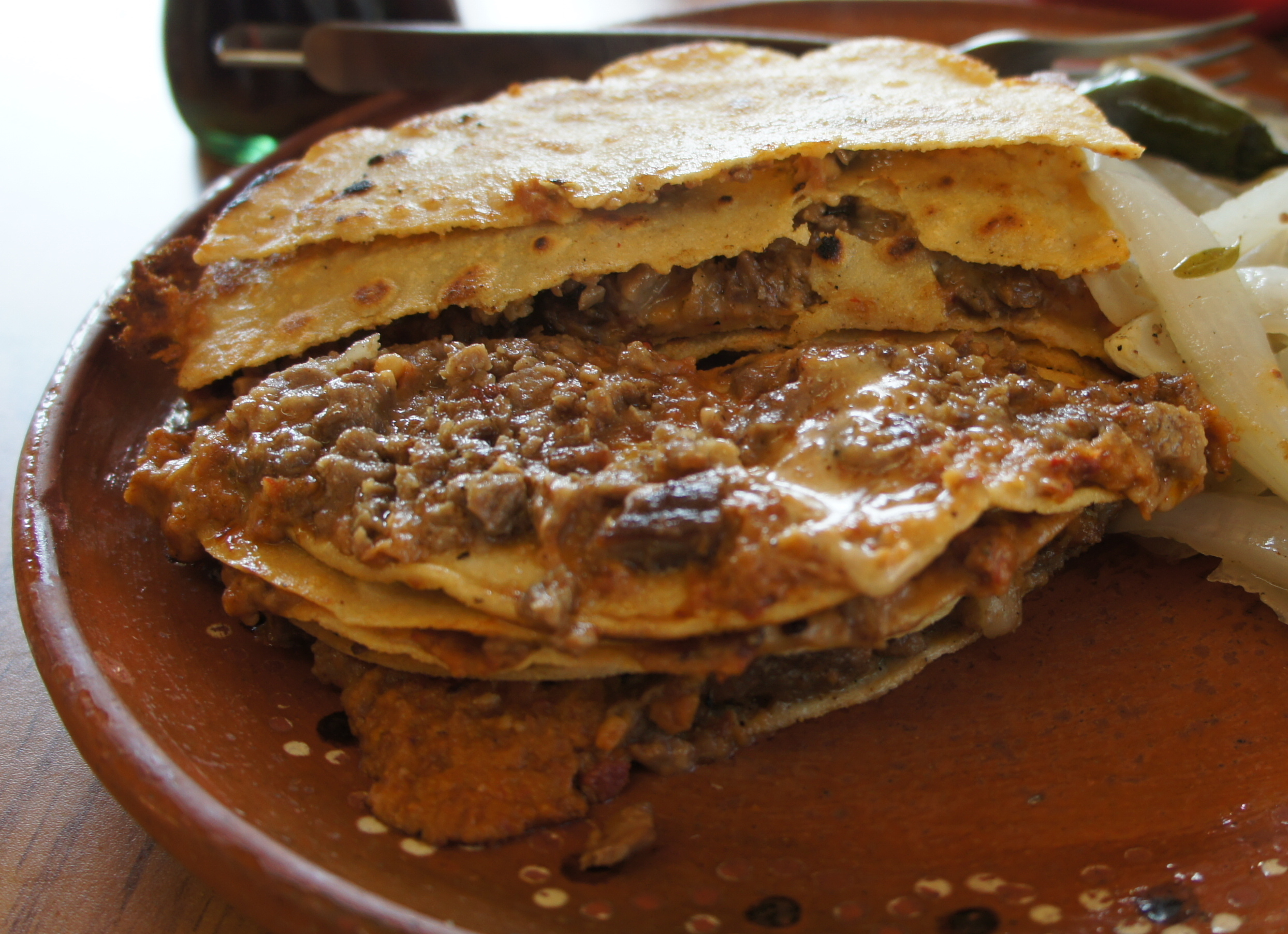
- Type: Sandwich
- Place of origin: Mexico
- Region or state: Nuevo León
- Serving temperature: Warm
- Main ingredients: Tortillas, lard, refried beans and salsa

An empalme (Spanish pronunciation: [emˈpalme], literally "junction") is a form of sandwich that is typical in the Mexican state of Nuevo León. It is commonly served in the Valle de las Salinas, and its origin is believed to be in the municipalities of Salinas Victoria or General Zuazua.

== Makeup ==
An empalme consists of two maize (corn) tortillas. One tortilla is spread with lard on both sides; refried beans and salsa are placed on top of it; then the second tortilla, again with pork lard, is added above the filling to complete the sandwich. It is then warmed up over a charcoal grill or on a comal.

The salsa used for empalmes is prepared with tomatoes, oregano and chillies. Chorizo, cheese or similar products may also be added.

This dish is similar in form to a stacked enchilada, a dish common in New Mexico.
