= Entomatada =

Mexican food dish

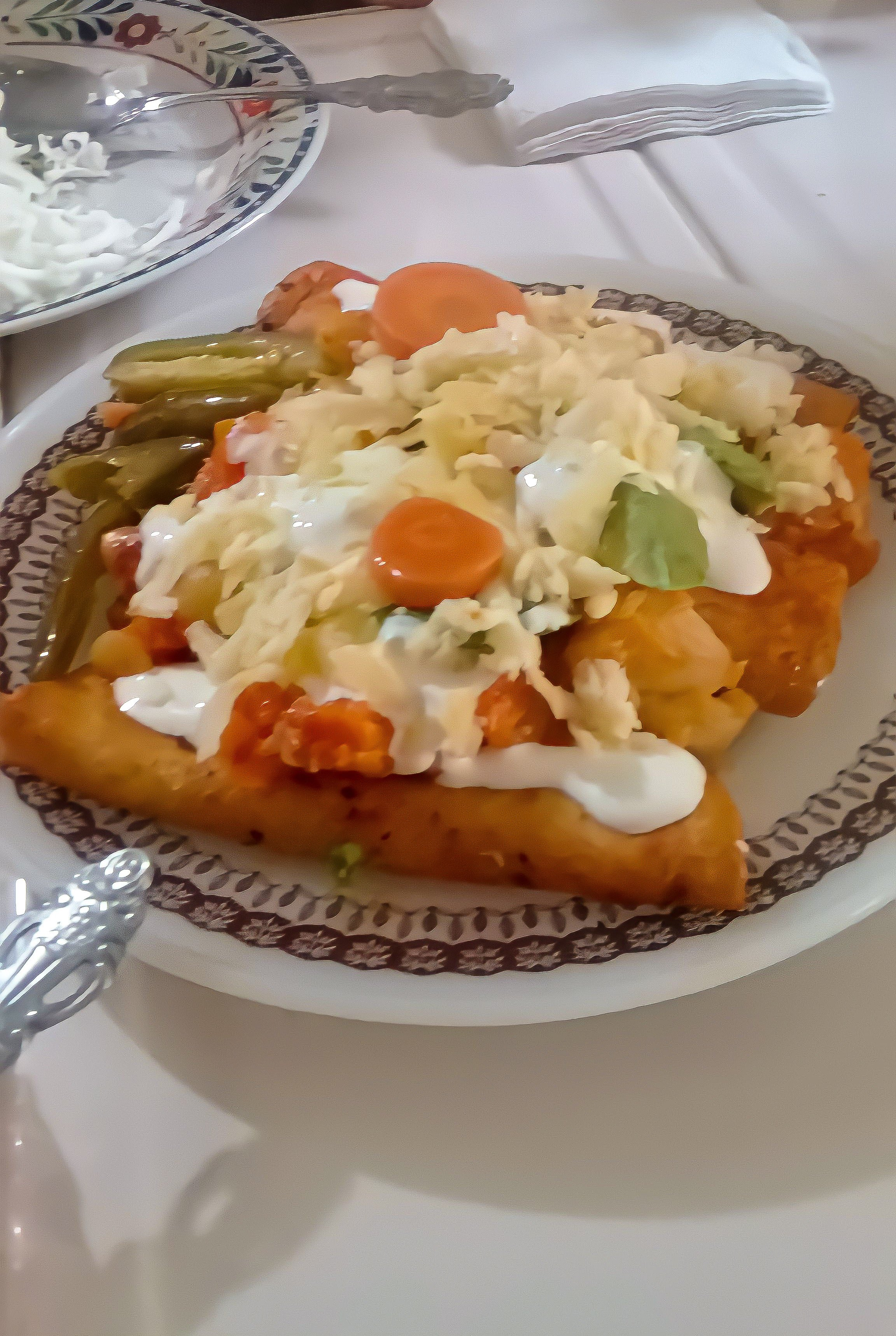
- A plate of entomatadas
- Place of origin: Mexico
- Main ingredients: Tortillas, tomato sauce (tomatoes, garlic, onion, oregano)

Entomatadas (Spanish: [entomaˈtaðas]) are a Mexican dish made of a folded corn tortilla which has first been fried in oil and then bathed in a tomato sauce made from tomatoes, garlic, onion, oregano, chile serrano (optional) and salt. The recipes for the tomato sauce vary by cook. The tortilla can be filled with a number of different ingredients; however, the most common are chicken, beef, cheese or beans. The chicken and beef have most often been pressure-cooked so that the meat is tender and can be pulled apart with the fingers. More tomato sauce is poured on top of the filled tortillas and the dish is garnished with sour cream, shredded cheese (queso fresco) and slices of white onion.

== Origin ==
Entomatadas first originated in Central Mexico. They have existed since the pre-Hispanic era.

== See also ==
- List of Mexican dishes
- List of tortilla-based dishes
