= Varallo =

Varallo may refer to:

== Persons ==
- Varallo (surname)
- Tanzio da Varallo (c. 1575/1580 – c. 1632/1633), Italian painter

== Places ==
- Varallo Pombia, an Italian comune in the province of Novara
- Varallo Sesia, an Italian comune in the province of Vercelli
  - Novara–Varallo railway
    - Varallo Sesia railway station
- Varallo's, the oldest restaurant in Tennessee
