= Tamale pie =

Pie and casserole dish

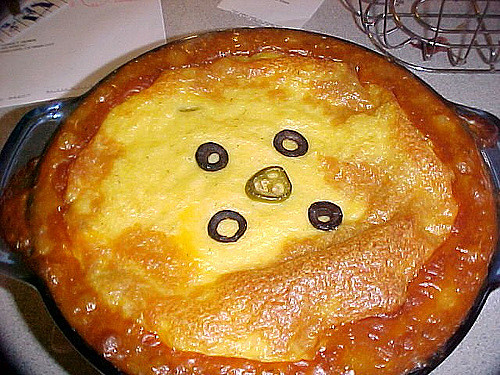
Tamale pie

Tamale pie is a pie and casserole dish associated with the cuisine of the Southwestern United States. It is adapted from the elements of the Mexican tamale, although it has never been popular in Mexican-American culture. The dish is made by lining a casserole dish with tamale dough and adding a spiced filling of meats, stews, or leftovers, sometimes with beans, salsa, or tomatoes. It is finally topped with more tamale dough and baked, sometimes with cheese on top.

The first tamale pies were made at the turn of the 20th century, at a time when tamales were a popular street food in America. By layering the elements of a tamale, the new dish took less time and energy to prepare. From the 1920s through 1950s, tamale pies were a staple of the American diet, promoted by the government in times of Depression and war as a way to stretch meat supplies, and enjoyed in all times for its perceived accessible exoticism and ability to keep as it stood at potlucks and Sunday suppers.

== Relationship with Mexican cooking ==
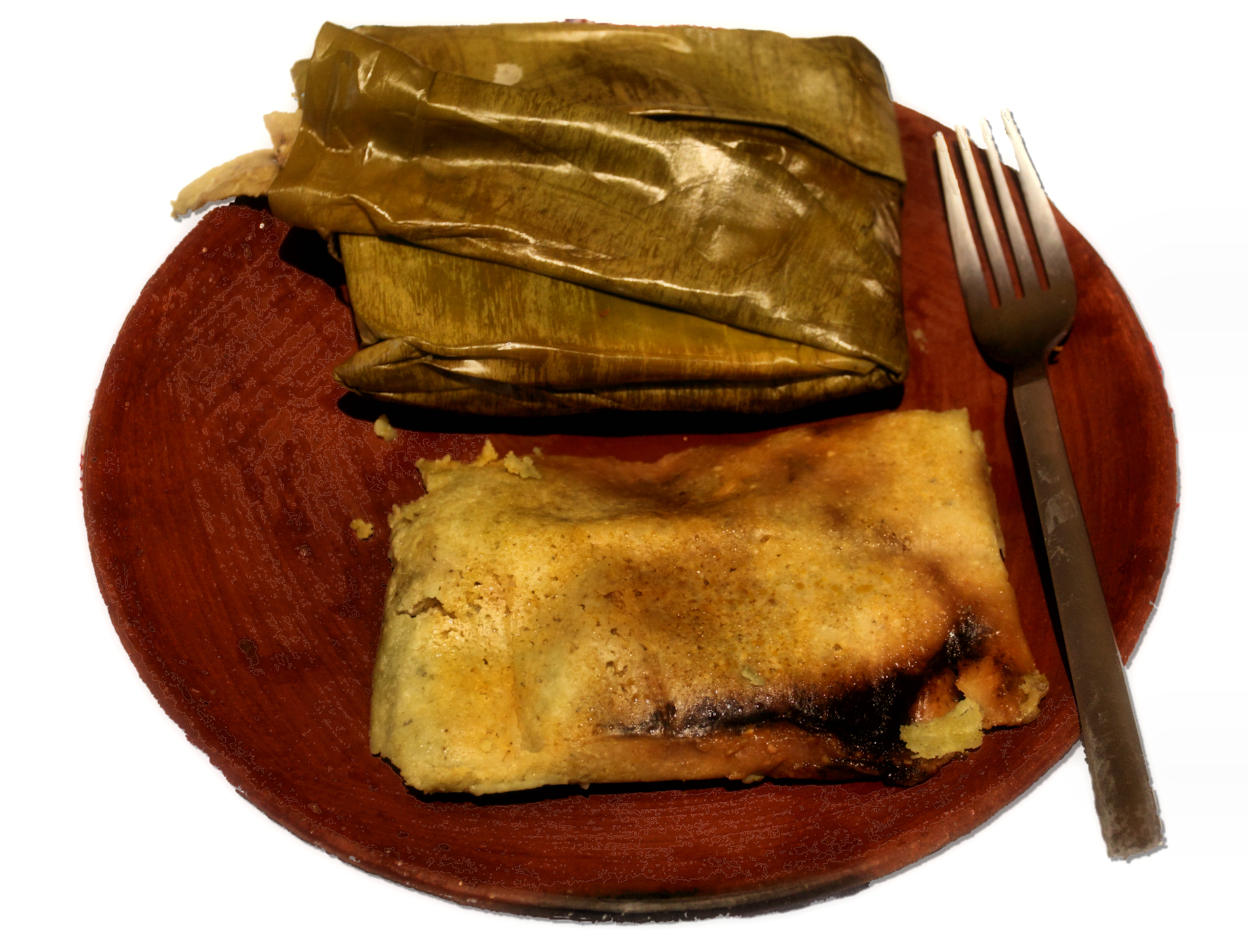
Tamale

Tamales are a Mexican dish, wherein fillings, such as meats, fruits, or vegetables, are enclosed in cornmeal dough and steamed or boiled in corn husk or banana leaf. In the tamale pie, this dish is adapted into a layered, baked, casserole dish. Despite a popular connotation of the pie with Mexican cuisine, this form of tamal has never been popular in Mexican-American culture.

Some sources identify the Mexican dish Mukbil Pollo, associated with the holiday Day of the Dead, as a "Yucatán tamale pie". Mukbil Pollo is made up of pork, chicken, and chilis enclosed in a corn dough. When ready to cook, it is wrapped in a banana leaf, and traditionally baked underground. Descriptions of the dish appear in John Lloyd Stephens's 1843 Incidents of Travel in Yucatán, wherein Stephens says "during the day every good Yucateco eats nothing but this."

== Preparation ==
Tamale pie, in portions
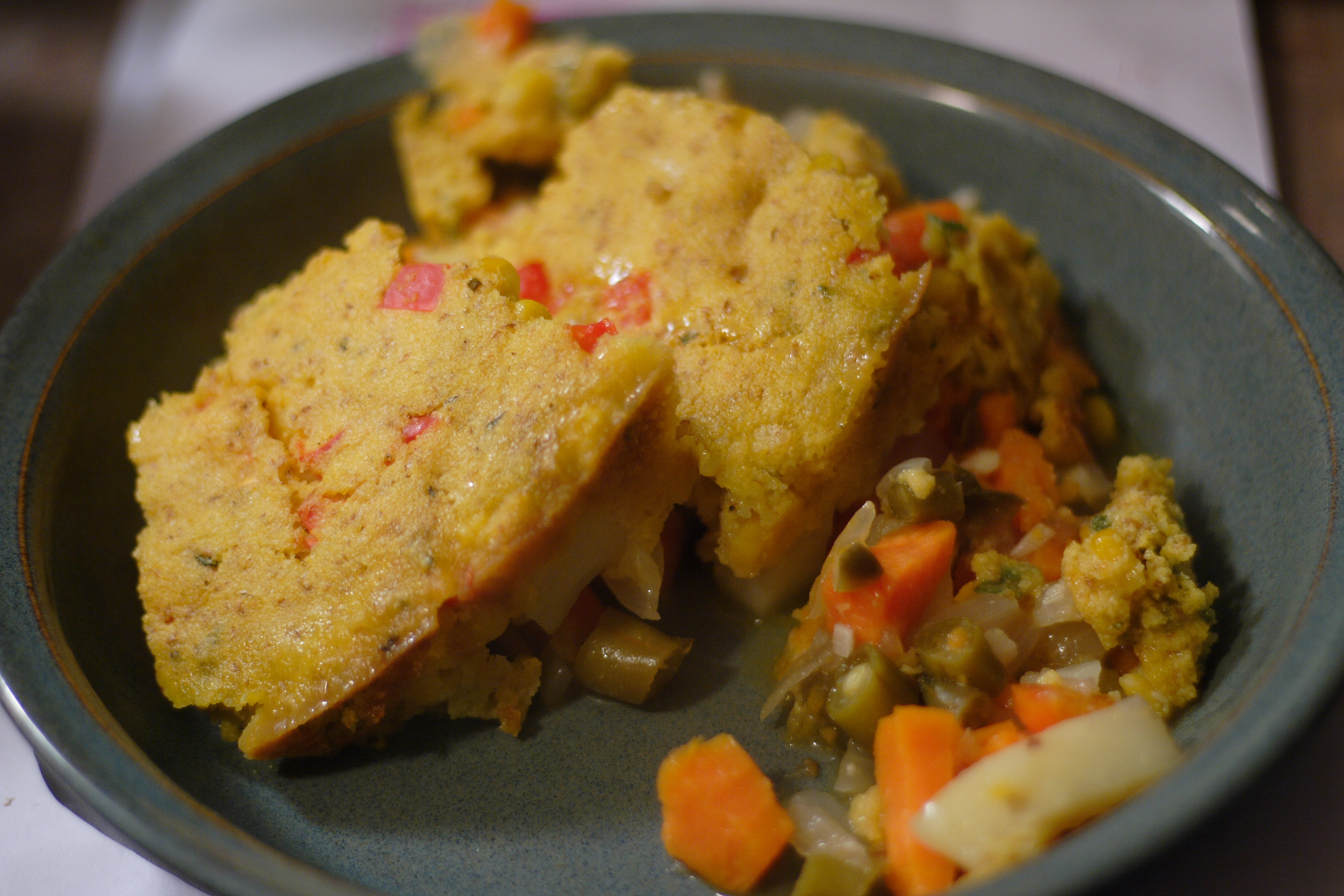
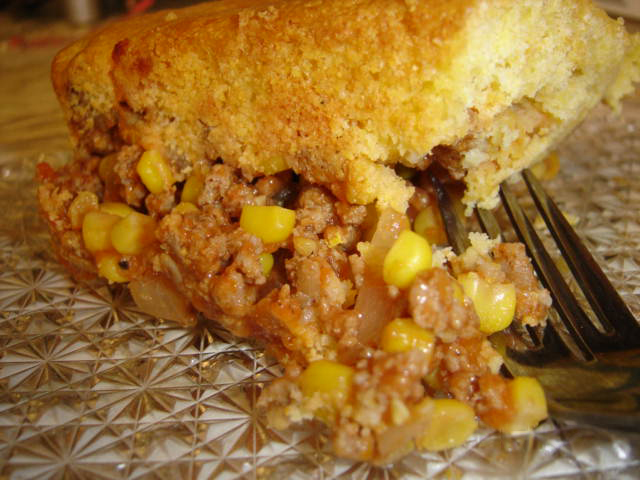

Tamale pies are prepared by lining a casserole dish with tamale dough, adding tamale fillings, and enclosing with the remaining dough. They are then baked until the crust takes on a slight brown coloration. The dish is served warm; food writer Huntley Dent reports that even among fans, a cold tamale pie is generally regarded as "inedible".

A typical filling for a tamale pie will include meat or meat stew and cheese. Spices associated with Mexican cuisine such as chili powder often feature, and beans, salsa or tomatoes sometimes do. In Tex-Mex cuisine, leftover chilli con carne is commonly employed as a filling, sometimes with the addition of chopped green olives. Some cooks forgo a basic tamale dough by adding strongly-flavoured ingredients, such as chicken stock and cream. Tamale pie has been described as a "comfort-food classic" in a Better Homes and Gardens publication, and is associated with the cuisine of the Southwestern United States.

== History ==
=== Origin ===
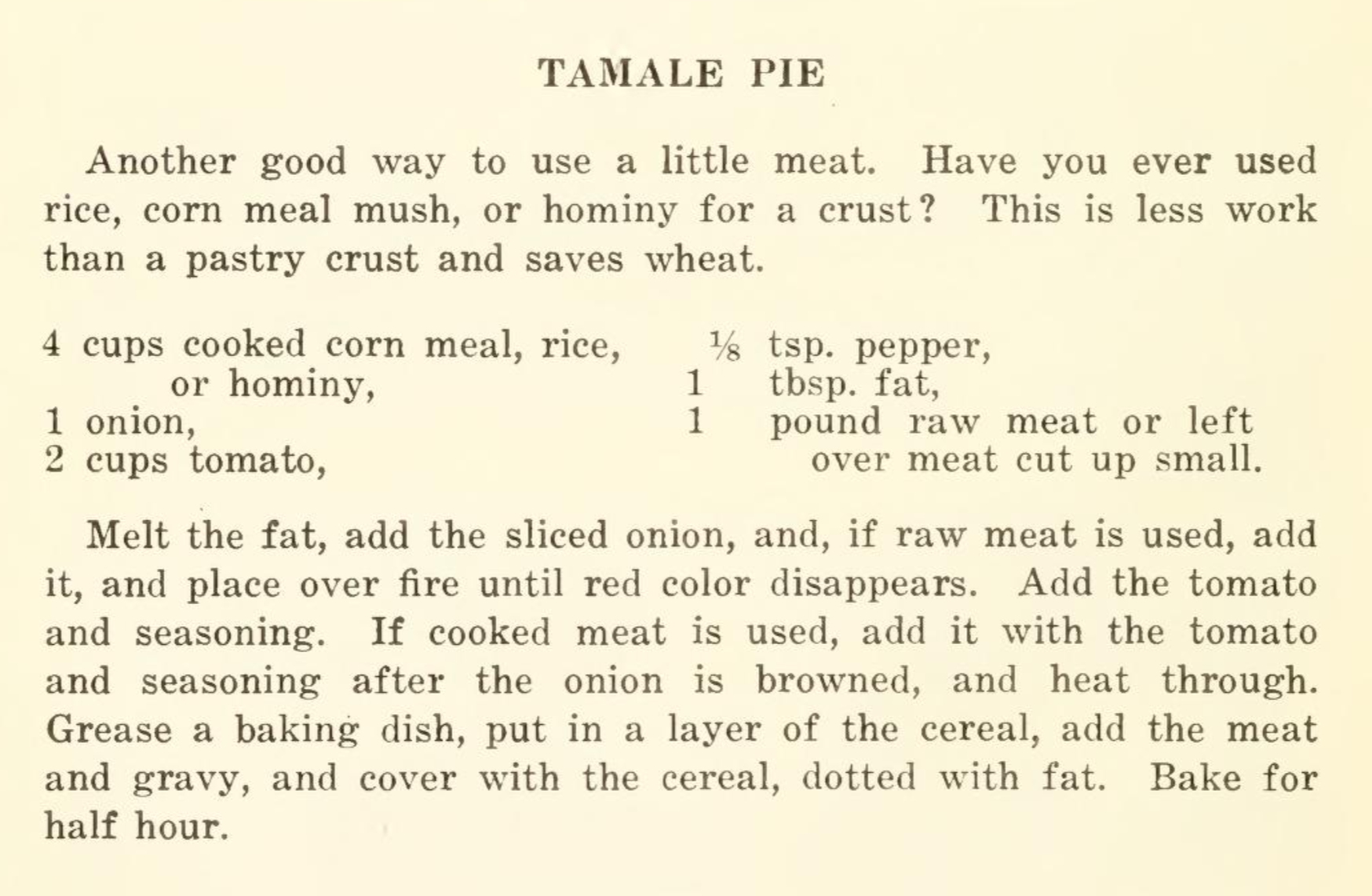
Recipe in the "Win the War" Cook Book (1918)

Tamale pie was invented in the United States around the beginning of the 20th century. By the 1890s, recently opened railways had made Mexico a popular destination for American tourists, and in this context tamales emerged as a popular street food in America, served fresh or from a can and marketed as an exotic, Mexican dish. In 1899 a book published in Austin, Texas, titled The Capitol Cook Book included a recipe for a pot pie similar to the modern tamale pie that used a wheat flour crust to top the dish. In 1905, The Times Cook Book #2 was published by the Los Angeles Times. This too included a similar dish in its recipe for a casserole with "cornmeal crusts above and below".

The first recipe for a "tamale pie", according to Mark H Zanger in The Oxford Encyclopedia of Food and Drink in America, was published in 1911. The new dish was convenient: cooked in a single pot, skipping the time-consuming steps of forming and steaming tamales. For their first few decades, tamale pies were made with seasoned ground beef or chicken on top of a layer of cornmeal mush, topped with another layer of mush. By the middle of the decade, the dish was included in the curricula of some home economics classes in U.S. high schools. Another cookbook published during World War I has a tamale pie recipe, stating that the dish can be utilized to save wheat which could then be directed towards the war effort.

=== Popular uptake ===
Tamale pies gained popularity in the 1920s, as they appealed to Americans who wanted to partake in Mexican and Spanish cuisine but were unwilling to experience the discomfort of spicy food. Culinary historian Sylvia Lovegren describes the dish as "amazingly popular" in this and the following decades, appearing frequently in cookbooks. Able to maintain flavour as it sat in a casserole dish, tamale pies were common at events including potlucks and Sunday suppers. Tomatoes, either canned or fresh, were often substituted with canned tomato soup. A popular adaptation in the 1920s was the tamale loaf, made by combining the tamale pie with milk and eggs, scattering corn and olives throughout, and placing the lot in a mold. Olives featured on this again as a topping, sliced, alongside a white sauce. (Note: Lovegren describes these as "very bad" and "an example of Domestic Cookery science at its highest and worst".)

By the 1930s, tamale pies were available in the United Kingdom for purchase in grocers specialising in foreign goods, marketed as Mexican in origin. In the US, which was experiencing the Great Depression, tamale pies offered the federal government a dish with little to no meat. Continuing into World War II, the government released publications containing basic recipes for tamale pies containing relatively little meat, such as this recipe in the 1934 pamphlet "Canned Beef Recipes":

Cook together 2 cups corn meal, 2 teaspoons salt, and 4 cups water to make a fairly thick mush. Mix 1 pint cut-up canned beef with 1 pint canned tomatoes, add a finely chopped onion, and salt and pepper to taste. Put a layer of mush in a greased baking dish or pan, add the meat mixture and cover with the rest of the mush. Bake in a moderate oven until hot through and lightly browned on top.

Chicken continued to be used as a filling; a report by workers dispatched in the New Deal's Federal Writers' Project described tamale pie as masa or the more convenient hominy grits combined with "cut-up chicken or beef, onions, tomatoes, fat, chili and olives . . . cooked in a baking dish". In their report, they attested that tamale pies were popular among Arizona's "American" population. Olives were just one of the additions cooks had made by this point. By the 1950s, recipes for tamale pies included cheese, corn, green pepper, and at times, curry powder. The bottom layer was often omitted, and the top replaced cornmeal mush with cornmeal batter. The 1950s was the last time the dish would be so prominent in the American diet. On TV, chefs instructed in its preparation, and individual cookbooks featured as many as nineteen recipes for the pies. Cookbook author and California cuisine advocate Helen Evans Brown gave a dissenting view in 1952, describing the tamale pie as ersatz good, inferior to the Mexican tamale. As of the mid-1980s, food writer Betty Fussell reported the pie had a poor reputation stemming from its basic Depression-era preparations.

Over the 20th century, tamale pies were not exclusively eaten by white Americans. By the 1970s, the tamale pie had made its way into the cuisines of America's ethnic minorities, as observed in descriptions of Japanese, female farmworkers in California making the dish, and by the 1990s, the Los Angeles Times was reporting the dish as popular in Kenya.

== See also ==
- List of casserole dishes
- List of pies

== Sources ==
- Aldrich, Elizabeth (2023). Casseroles, Can Openers, and Jell-O: American Food and the Cold War, 1947–1959. State University of New York Press. ISBN 978-1-438-49306-0.
- Bégin, Camille (2016). Taste of the Nation: The New Deal Search for America's Food. University of Illinois Press. ISBN 978-0-252-09851-2.
- Collins, Kathleen (2015). "Cooking Class: The rise of the "foodie' and the role of mass media". In Helstosky, Carol (ed.). The Routledge History of Food. Routledge Histories. Oxon & New York: Taylor & Francis. ISBN 978-0-415-62847-1.
- Colquhoun, Kate (2007). Taste: the Story of Britain Through its Cooking. New York: Bloomsbury. ISBN 978-1-5969-1410-0.
- Dent, H. (1985). Feast of Santa Fe: Cooking of the American Southwest. A fireside book. New York: Simon & Schuster. ISBN 0-671-47686-6.
- Fussell, Betty (1986). I Hear America Cooking. New York: Elisabeth Sifton Books. ISBN 0-670-81241-2.
- Gabaccia, Donna R (1998). We Are What We Eat: Ethnic Food and the Making of Americans. Cambridge, Massachusetts and London: Harvard University Press. ISBN 0-674-00190-7.
- Gardens, B.H. (2011). The Ultimate Casseroles Book: More than 400 Heartwarming Dishes from Dips to Desserts. Better Homes and Gardens Ultimate. Houghton Mifflin Harcourt. ISBN 978-0-544-18850-1.
- Kennedy, Diana (2000). The Essential Cuisines of Mexico. New York: Clarkson Potter. ISBN 978-0-307-58772-5.
- Kraig, Bruce (2017). A Rich and Fertile Land: A History of Food in America. Foods and nations. London: Reaktion Books. ISBN 978-1-78023-853-1.
- Lovegren, Sylvia (1995). Fashionable Food: Seven Decades of Food Fads. New York: Macmillan. ISBN 978-0-02-575705-9.
- Smith, Andrew F, ed. (2013). The Oxford Encyclopedia of Food and Drink in America. Oxford University Press. ISBN 978-0199739226.
  - Smith, Andrew F. "Tamales". In Smith (2013).
  - Zanger, Mark H. "Tamale pie". In Smith (2013).
