= Chili con carne =

Tex-Mex stew with chili peppers and meat

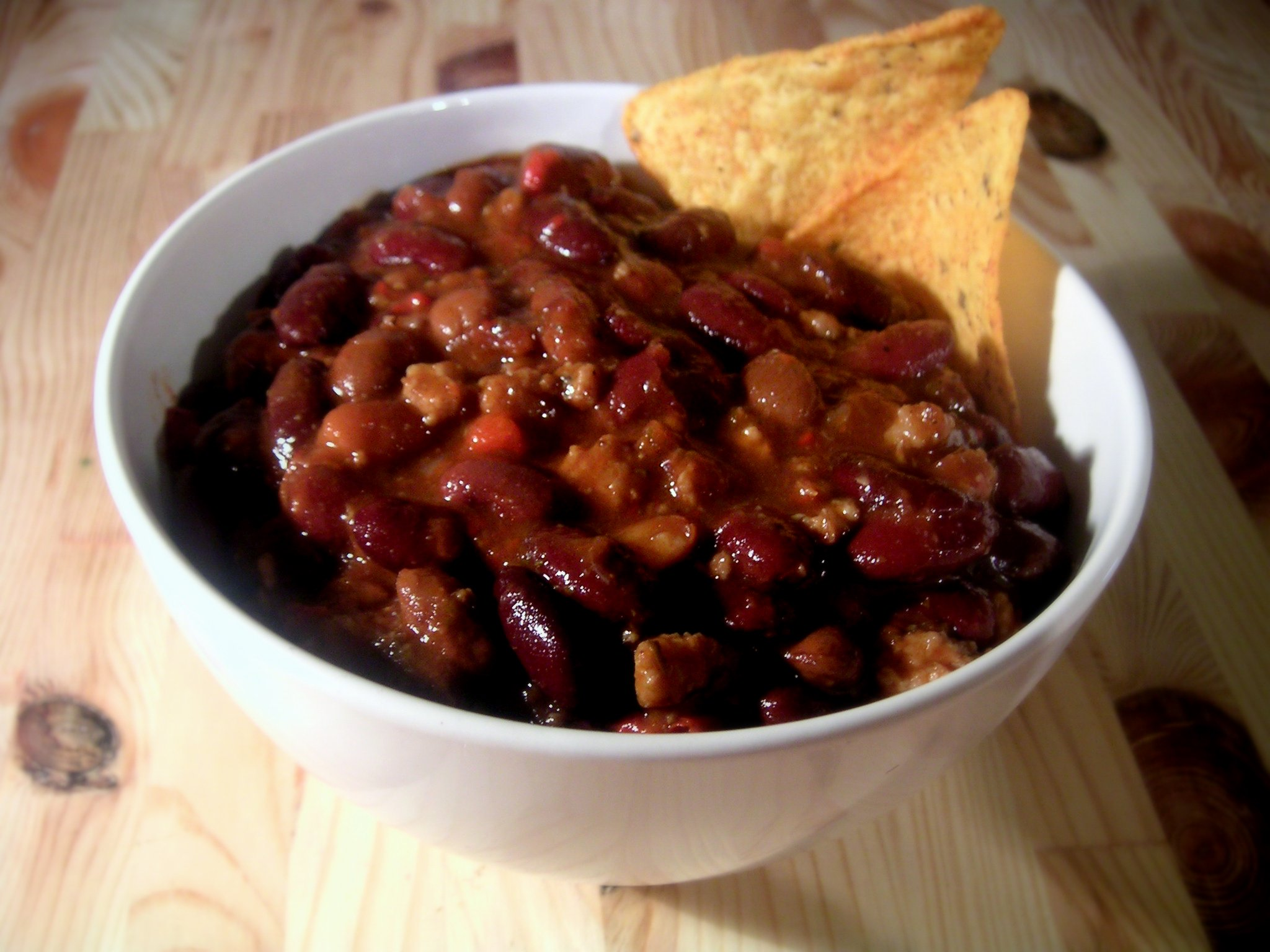
- A bowl of chili con carne, with the addition of beans, served with tortilla chips
- Alternative names: Carne con chile, chili, chilli
- Course: Main
- Place of origin: Mexico; United States
- Main ingredients: Chili peppers, meat, tomatoes, beans, spices
- Variations: Vegetarian chili, chili verde, white chili

Chili con carne (Note: Also spelled in British English as chilli con carne or chile con carne) (Spanish: [ˈtʃili koŋ ˈkaɾne], lit. 'chili with meat'), often shortened to chili, is a spicy stew of Mexican origin containing chili peppers (sometimes in the form of chili powder), meat (usually beef), tomatoes, and beans. Other seasonings may include garlic, onions, and cumin.

The types of meat and other ingredients used vary based on geographic and personal tastes. Recipes provoke disputes among aficionados, some of whom insist that the word chili applies only to the basic dish, without beans and tomatoes. Chili con carne is a common dish for cook-offs, and may be used as a side. It is often garnished with various cheeses or salsas.

== Origins and history ==
In writings from 1529, the Franciscan friar Bernardino de Sahagún described chili pepper-seasoned stews being eaten in the Aztec capital, Tenochtitlan, now the location of Mexico City. The use of beef as the primary meat originated when the Spanish introduced cattle to Mexico.

Most of the beef being consumed in Mexico, especially by the rancheros (cowboys) in the 17th, 18th, and 19th centuries, consisted of dried salted beef known as tasajo or cecina. Tasajo was used in many dishes, including a stew of red chili sauce known as carne con chile, (meat with chili). Carne con chile was very common throughout much of Mexico, as it was an easy and cheap meal. An English naval officer and explorer, George Francis Lyon, wrote in 1826 about eating dried beef in a chili sauce with rancheros while travelling through northern Veracruz, near Pánuco:

I then joined a party of Rancheros who had assembled to kill a cow and cut her flesh into tasajo, —an operation which they performed with extraordinary skill and dispatch, separating the sinews from the flesh with anatomical precision. Two men devoted themselves to cutting the meat into long strings or ropes, which they threw to another who rubbed them well with salt: after this, no other process remained but to hang the beef in festoons over long poles to dry in the sun. I breakfasted with the Rancheros, when their work was done, on dry meat with chili sauce and piping hot tortillas served up in rapid succession. Our second course was a dish of cow's blood stewed with sweet herbs: and having prefaced our meal by a glass of white brandy distilled in the Rancho, we all ate heartily.

French colonist Mathieu de Fossey had a similar experience in 1831 when he was served tasajo cooked in chili in the village of Jáltipan near Coatzacoalcos in southern Veracruz:

That day we had a completely Indian meal, in which they served us tasajo cooked with chili, beans and tortillas. They call tasajo the meat that is dried in the sun after being salted and cut into long, thin strips to prevent putrefaction, which would be more active than the absorptive force of the sun, if one tried to dry it in thicker pieces, and despite this caution, it always retains an unpleasant smell and taste.

In her 1843 book Life in Mexico, Scottish noblewoman Frances Erskine Inglis wrote about eating a dish called embarrado, a composition of meat and chili, while attending the rodeo (cattle roundup) and herradero (cattle branding celebration) in the village of Santiago in the state of Hidalgo in 1840:

The Indians had cooked meat under the stones for us, which I found horrible, smelling and tasting of smoke. But we had also boiled fowls, and quantities of burning chili, hot tortillas, atole, or atolli, as the Indians call it, a species of cakes made of very fine maize and water, and sweetened with sugar or honey; embarrado, a favourite composition of meat and chili, very like mud, as the name imports, which I have not yet made up my mind to endure; quantities of fresh tunas, granaditas, bananas, aguacates, and other fruits, besides pulque, à discrétion.

American traveler Theodore Taylor Johnson also wrote about eating carne con chile while in San Blas, Nayarit, in 1849:

Returning to the town we obtained a true Mexican dinner, consisting of jerked beef stewed with onions and plenty of cayenne pepper, which they call "carne con chile colorado". This was accompanied by the ever lasting frijoles or beans; and for desert, delicious chocolate and tortillas.

In Spanish, the term "chile con carne" (consisting of the word chile (from the Nahuatl chīlli) and con carne, Spanish for "with meat") is first recorded in a book from 1857 about the Mexican–American War. A recipe dating back to the 1850s describes dried beef, suet, dried chili peppers and salt, which were pounded together, formed into bricks and left to dry, which could then be boiled in pots in an army encampment in Monterrey, of what is now Nuevo León, Mexico.

Chili also became commonly prepared in northern Mexico and southern Texas. Unlike some other Texas foods, such as barbecued brisket, chili largely originated with working-class Tejana and Mexican women. The "chili queens" of San Antonio, Texas, were particularly famous in previous decades for selling their inexpensive chili-flavored beef stew in their casual "chili joints".

The San Antonio Chili Stand, in operation at the 1893 Columbian Exposition in Chicago, helped popularize chili by giving many Americans their first taste of it. San Antonio was a tourist destination and helped Texas-style chili con carne spread throughout the South and West of the United States. Chili con carne is the official dish of the U.S. state of Texas as designated by the House Concurrent Resolution Number 18 of the 65th Texas Legislature during its regular session in 1977.

=== Chili parlors ===
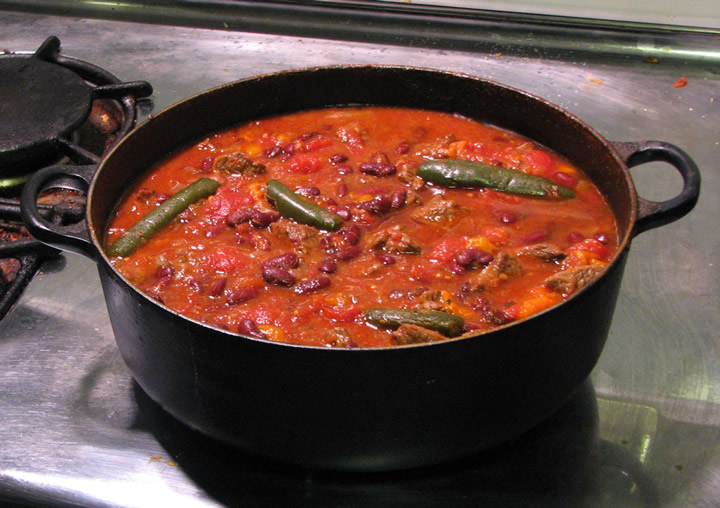
A pot of chili with whole green hot chilis, kidney beans, and tomatoes

Before World War II, hundreds of small, family-run chili parlors could be found throughout Texas and other states, particularly those in which émigré Texans had made new homes. Each establishment usually had a claim to some kind of secret recipe.

By 1904, chili parlors were opening outside of Texas, in part due to the availability of commercial versions of chili powder, first manufactured in Texas in the late 19th century. After working at the Louisiana Purchase Exposition, Charles Taylor opened a chili parlor in Carlinville, Illinois, serving Mexican Chili. Varallo's, the oldest restaurant in Tennessee, opened as a chili parlor in 1907, competing with other chili parlors that had opened in Nashville during the 1890s. In the 1920s and 1930s, chains of diner-style chili parlors began opening in the Midwest.

Cincinnati chili is a substantially different dish developed by Macedonian and Greek immigrants, deriving from their own culinary traditions. Dozens of restaurants offer this style throughout the Cincinnati area. It can be traced back to at least 1922, when the original Empress Chili location opened.

In Green Bay, Wisconsin, Chili John's chili parlor was founded in 1913. As with Cincinnati chili, their chili is most commonly served over spaghetti with oyster crackers, but the recipe has more chili powder and fat. The original proprietor's son opened a second location in Burbank, California, in 1946, which remains open; the Green Bay location closed in 2020.

Until the late 2000s, a chili parlor dating to 1904, O.T. Hodge, continued to operate in St. Louis. It featured a chili-topped dish called a slinger: two cheeseburger patties, hash browns, and two eggs, smothered in chili. No O.T. Hodge-branded locations remain.

Ben's Chili Bowl in Washington, DC, founded in 1958, is a significant local institution and has been noted on national lists, although the Washington Post called the food "awful" in a 2016 review, despite the restaurant's "importance."

== Dispute over ingredients ==
=== Beans ===
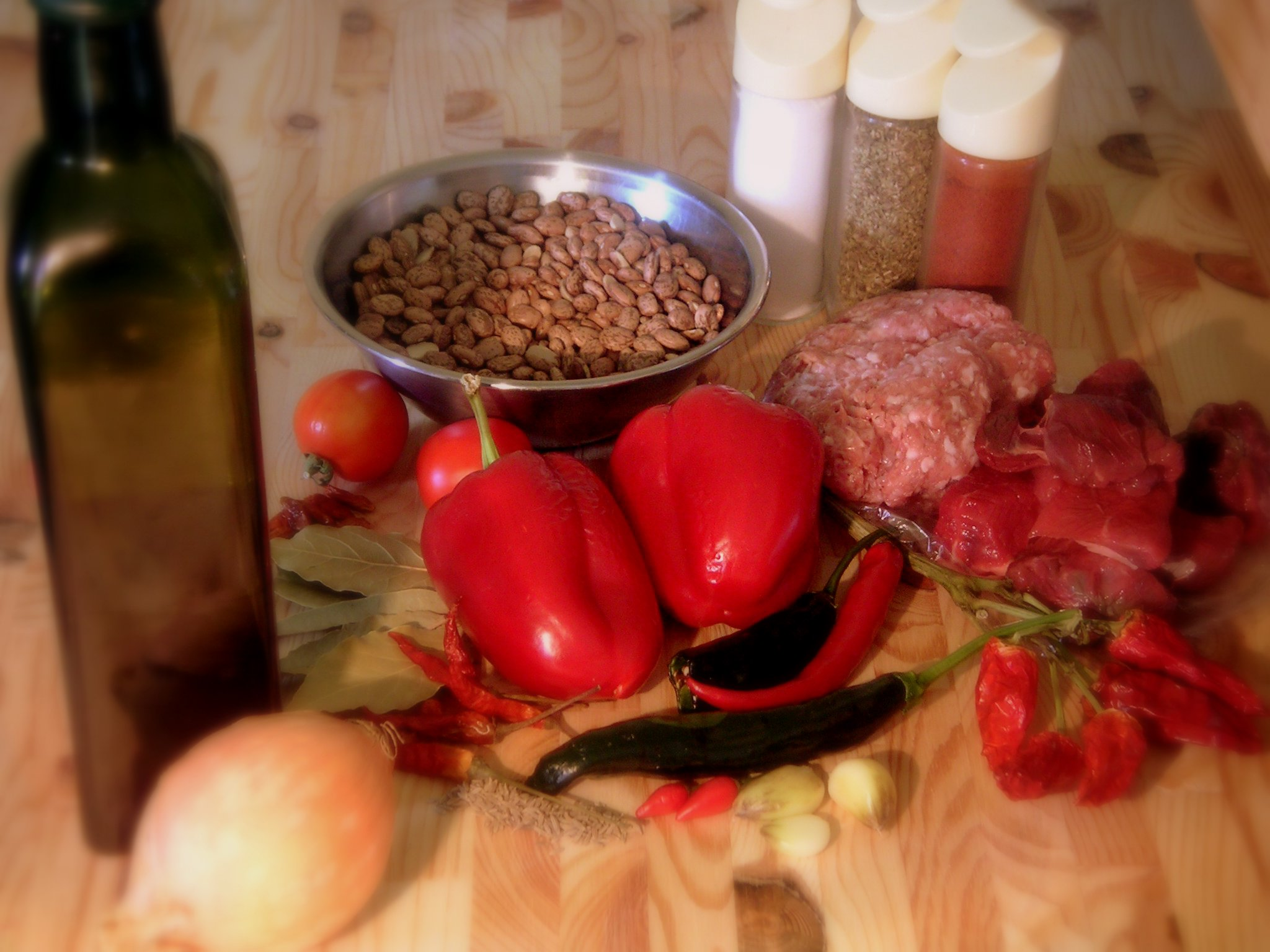
Ingredients for chili con carne with beans

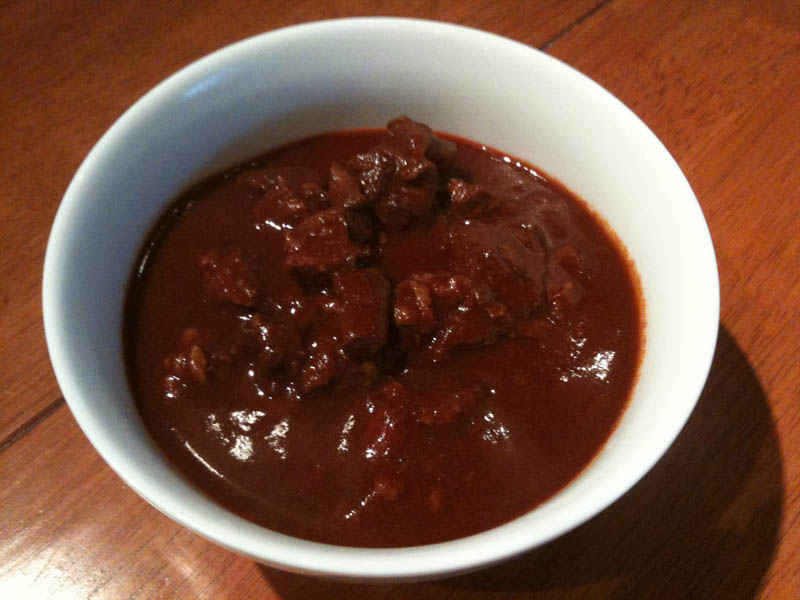
A bowl of Texas-style chili without beans

Beans, a staple of Tex-Mex cuisine, have been associated with chili as far back as the early 20th century. The question of whether beans belong in chili has long been a matter of contention among chili cooks. While it is generally accepted that the earliest chilis did not include beans, proponents of their inclusion contend that chili with beans has a sufficiently long history to be considered authentic. The Chili Appreciation Society International, an organization that mainly operates in Texas, specified in 1999 that, among other rules, cooks in their competitions are forbidden to include beans in the preparation of chili for official competition—nor are they allowed to marinate any meats. Small red or pink common beans are commonly used for chili, as are black beans, black-eyed peas, kidney beans, pinto beans, great northern beans, or navy beans.

Most commercially prepared canned chili is offered in two varieties, with or without beans. Some U.S. manufacturers, notably Bush Brothers and Company and Eden Organic, also sell canned precooked beans (without meat) that are labeled "chili beans"; these beans are intended for consumers to add to a chili recipe and are often sold with spices added.

=== Tomatoes ===
Tomatoes are another ingredient on which opinions differ. Wick Fowler, a north Texas newspaperman and inventor of "Two-Alarm Chili" (which he later marketed as a kit of spices), insisted on adding tomato sauce to his chili in the ratio of one 15-ounce can per three pounds of meat (425 g per 1.36 kg). He also believed that chili should never be eaten freshly cooked, but refrigerated overnight to seal in the flavor. Matt Weinstock, a Los Angeles newspaper columnist, once remarked that Fowler's chili "was reputed to open eighteen sinus cavities unknown to the medical profession".

== Variations ==
=== Vegetarian chili ===
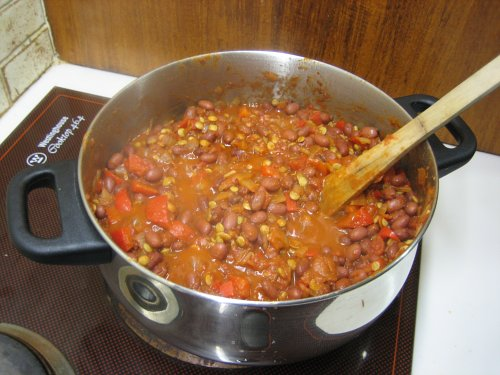
A pot of vegetarian chili

Vegetarian chili (also known as chili sin carne, chili without meat, chili non carne, and chili sans carne) is prepared without meat or substitutes a meat analogue, such as textured vegetable protein or tofu, quinoa, or a starchy vegetable, such as potatoes. These chilis nearly always include beans. Variants may contain corn, squash, sautéed mushrooms, pearl onions, shallots or beets.

=== Chile verde ===
Chile verde ('green chile') is a New Mexican stew or sauce usually made from chunks of pork that have been slow-cooked in chicken broth, garlic, green tomatillos, and roasted green chile. The spiciness of the chile is adjusted by the use of various peppers: Hatch chile, poblano, jalapeño, serrano, and occasionally habanero.

=== Cactus chili ===
Cactus chili is a spicy Southwestern stew that is a variation on traditional chili con carne, usually containing traditional ingredients such as chili peppers, beef, tomatoes, and pinto beans, along with sliced cactus pieces. It is traditionally cooked in a slow cooker and served with a side of salted crackers. Cactus chili is a relatively rare variation of chili con carne. However, it has gained prominence as a menu item at restaurant chains such as Showmars.

=== White chili ===
White chili is made using chicken or turkey meat and broth, white beans, and green chili peppers. The resulting dish appears light in color when cooked. A white cheese, such as Monterey Jack, or sour cream is often added when served.

== Accompaniments and additions ==
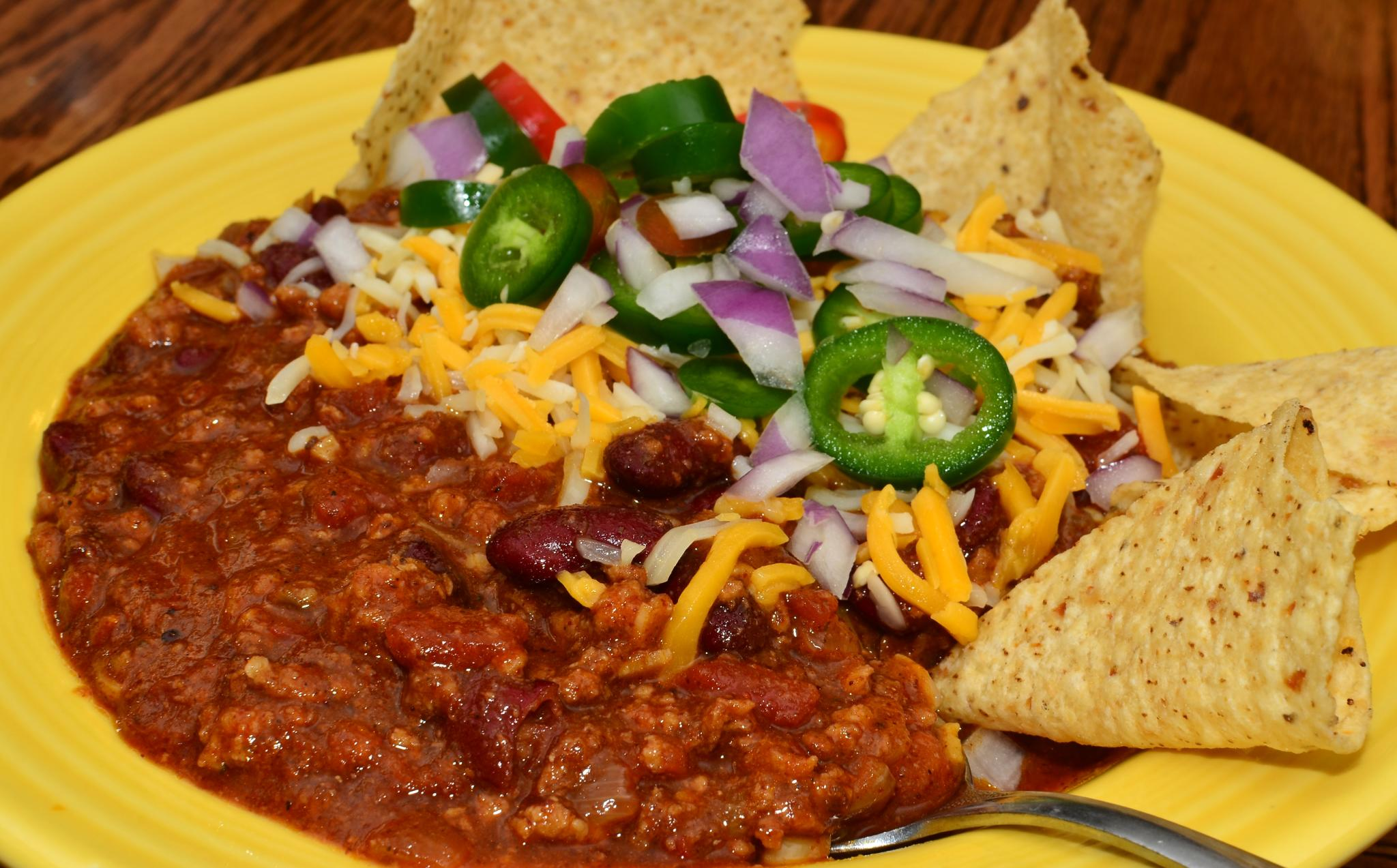
Chili with garnishes and tortilla chips

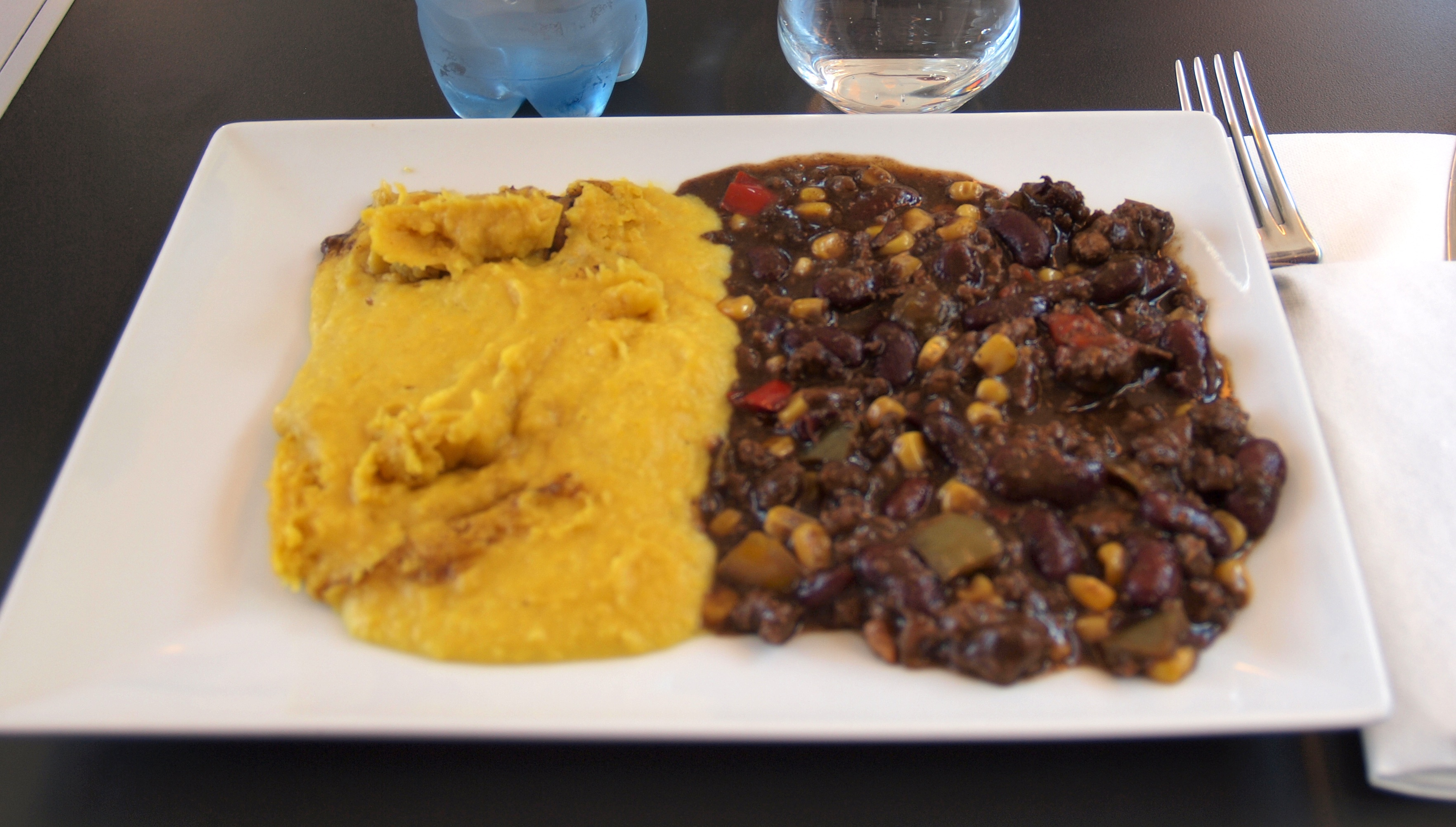
Chili with mashed corn served in Austria

The dish may be served with a variety of toppings or accompaniments. Common garnishes include grated cheese, diced onions, and sour cream. It is often served with saltine crackers, tortilla chips or corn chips, cornbread, rolled-up corn or flour tortillas, and pork tamales. Chili can also be served over rice or pasta in dishes such as chili mac.

In parts of the Midwestern United States, particularly in states such as Nebraska, Iowa, and Kansas, chili is commonly served with cinnamon rolls, a regional tradition found in school cafeterias, home cooking, and even at some restaurants in the area.

== Premade chili ==
=== Canned chili ===
Willie Gebhardt, originally of New Braunfels, Texas, and later of San Antonio, produced the first canned chili in 1908. Rancher Lyman Davis near Corsicana, Texas, developed Wolf Brand Chili in 1895. He owned a meat market and was a particular fan of Texas-style chili. In the 1880s, in partnership with an experienced range cook, he began producing heavily spiced chili based on chunks of lean beef and rendered beef suet, which he sold by the pot to local cafés.

In 1921, Davis began canning his product, naming it for his pet wolf, Kaiser Bill. Wolf Brand canned chili was a favorite of Will Rogers, who always took along a case when traveling and performing in other regions of the world. Country singer Ernest Tubb was such a fan that one Texas hotel maintained a supply of Wolf Brand for his visits. Both the Gebhardt and Wolf brands are now owned by ConAgra Foods, Inc. Another major maker of canned chili, Hormel, sells chili available with or without beans, made with turkey or in vegetarian varieties, under their own name and other brands like Stagg.

=== Brick chili ===
Another method of marketing commercial chili in the days before widespread home refrigerators was "brick chili". It was produced by pressing out nearly all of the moisture, leaving a solid substance roughly the size and shape of a half-brick. Wolf Brand was originally sold in this form. Commonly available in small towns and rural areas of the American Southwest in the first three-quarters of the 20th century, brick chili has largely been superseded by canned chili. A few manufacturers, such as XLNT Foods and Dolores Canning in Southern California, continue to distribute brick chili to supermarkets.

=== Seasoning mixes ===
Instead of adding multiple seasonings, seasoning mixes can be prepared ahead of time using dry ingredients such as chili powder, salt, cumin, onion powder, and cayenne pepper. Ready-made mixes can be purchased; those sold as taco seasoning are also suitable.

== Other dishes made with chili ==
- A chili dog is a hot dog served with a topping of chili (usually without beans).
- A chili burger is a burger topped with chili (usually without beans).
- Chili is also added to french fries and cheese to make chili cheese fries, or Coney Island fries.
- Chili mac is a dish made with canned chili, or roughly the same ingredients as chili (meat, spices, onion, tomato sauce, beans, and sometimes other vegetables), with the addition of macaroni or some other pasta. Chili mac is a standard dish in the U.S. military and is one of the varieties of Meal, Ready-to-Eat (MRE).
- A Frito pie or walking taco, as it is called at festivals and county fairs in the midwest, typically consists of a small, single-serving bag of Fritos corn chips with a cup of chili poured over them, often topped with grated cheese or onions and jalapeños and sour cream. Frito pies are popular in the southwestern United States.
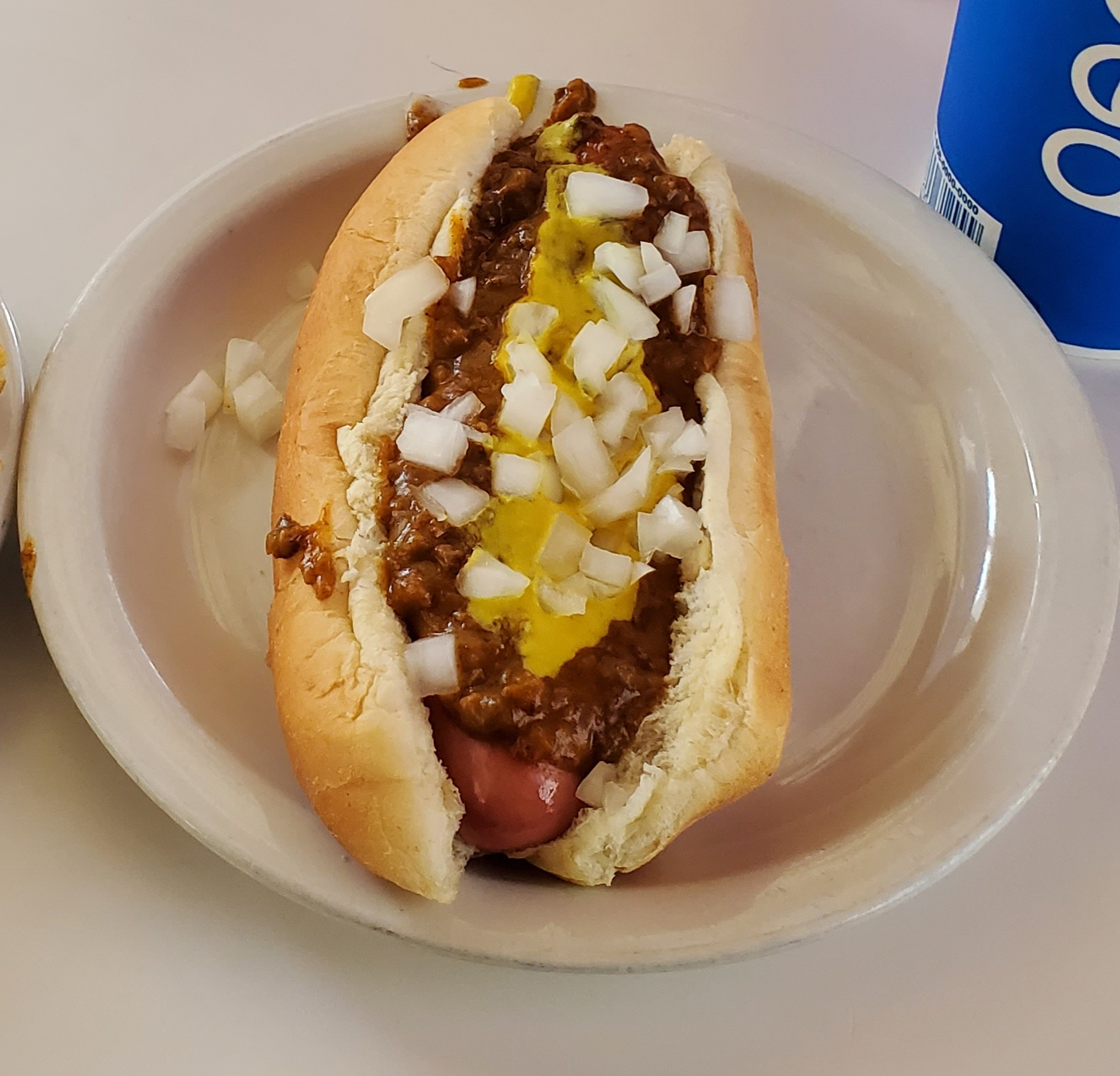
A Coney Island hot dog in Detroit, with chili, onions, and mustard

A hamburger with chili

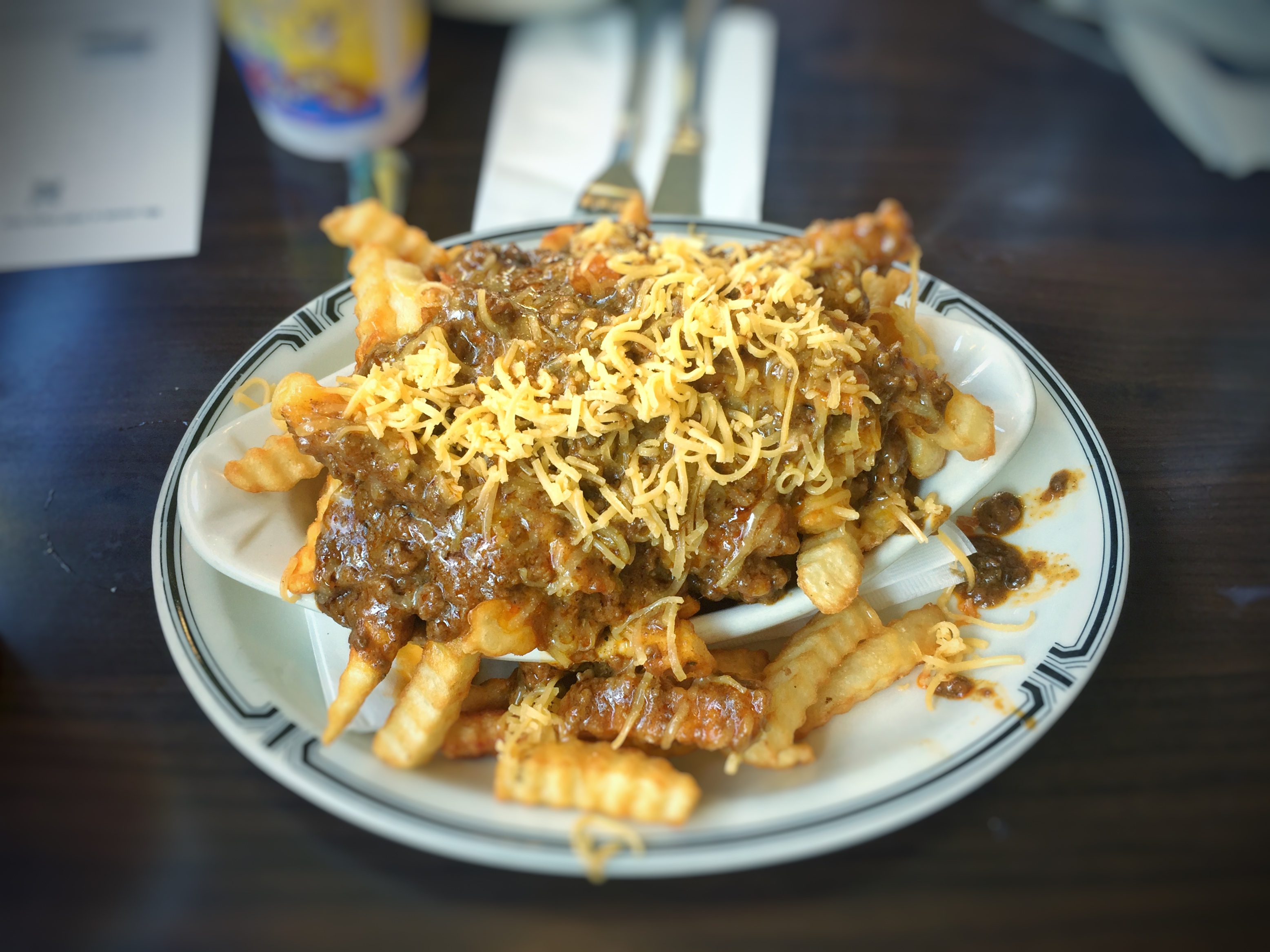
French fries topped with chili con carne and cheese

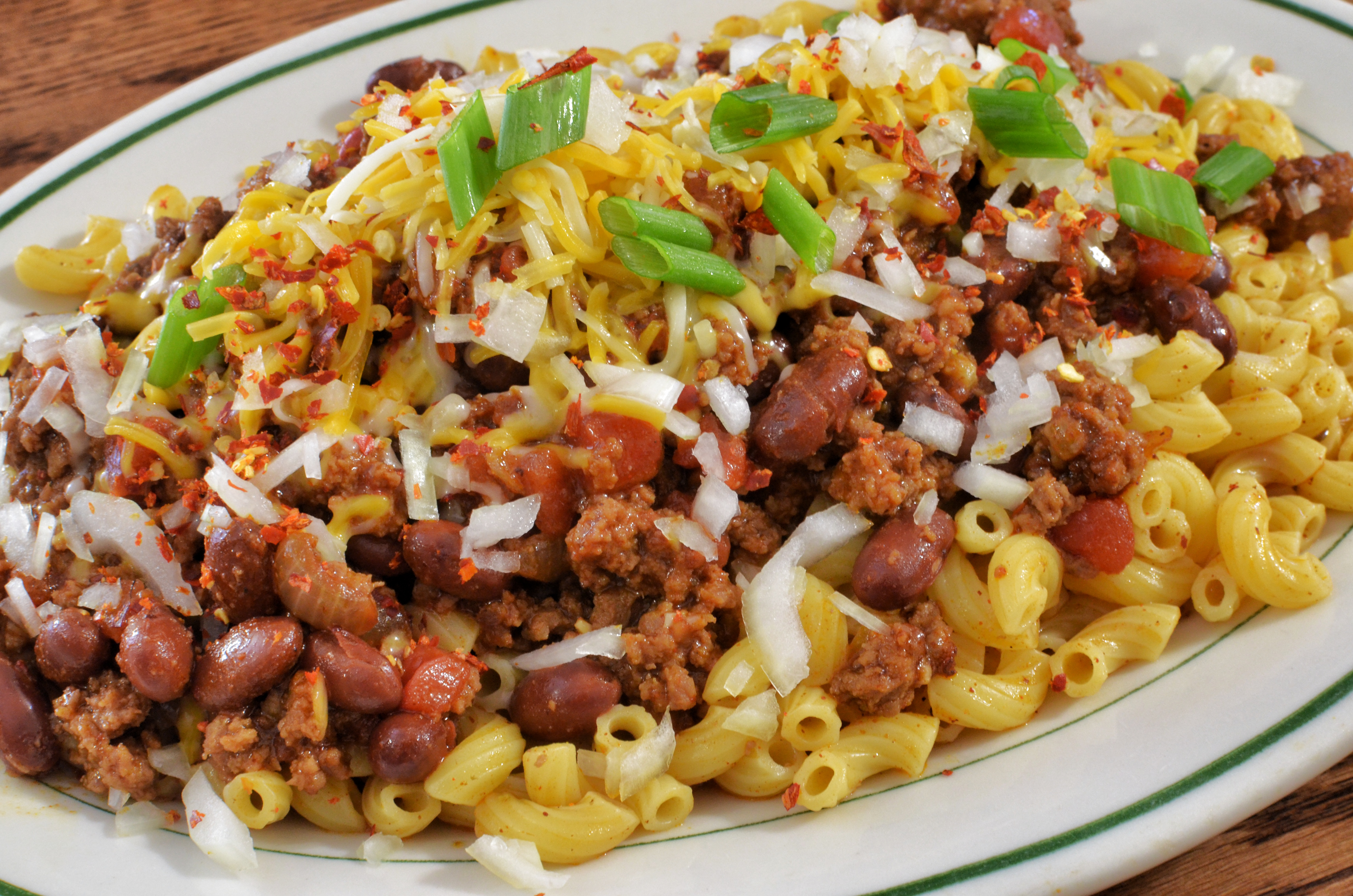
Chili mac

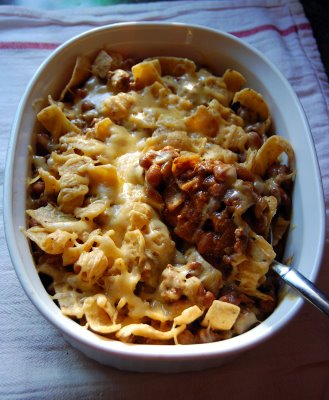
A Frito pie

== See also ==
- List of stews
- List of legume dishes
- Chili powder – food spice made from chili peppers
