= Uchepo =

Mexican cuisine dish

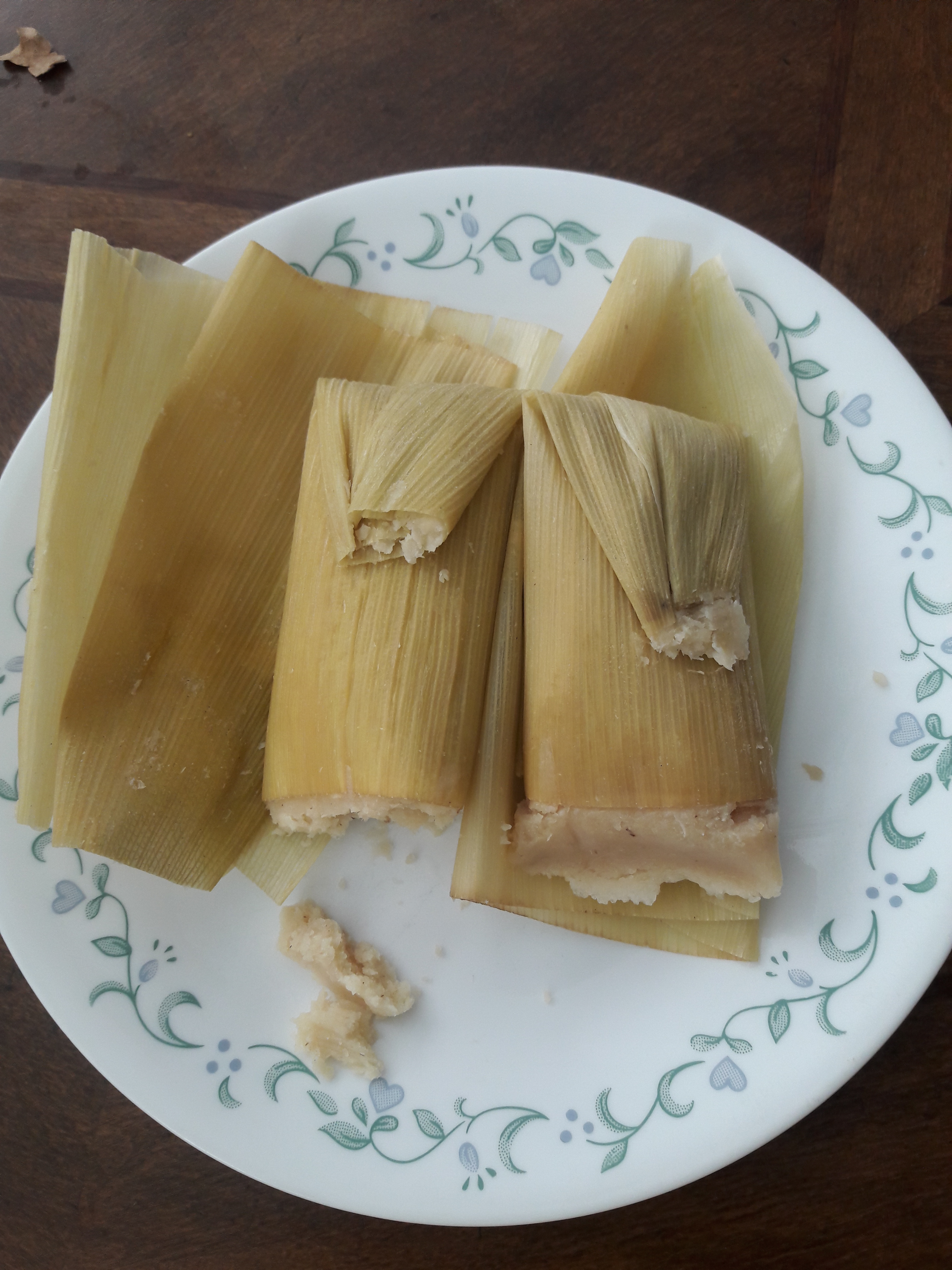

Chepos, also regionally known as uchepos, is a dish in Mexican cuisine, a tamal made with tender maize (corn). It has a sweet taste and its consistency is soft. The uchepo can be served on its own, or with green tomatillo salsa or tomato cooked and accompanied by fresh cheese or sour cream.

As a dessert, it is usually served and bathed in sweetened condensed milk.

Although it is considered to have originated in the Mexican state of Michoacan, chepo can be found in other states of the republic where it is called corn tamal. In other regions of Central America it is also called corn tamal. In some regions in South America these tamales are called humitas, and recipes may call for spices, raisins, and other sweet ingredients such as cajeta blanca, arequipe, dulce de leche, and manjar.
