= Atamalqualiztli =

Aztec religious festival

Atamalqualiztli (The Eating of Water Tamales or the Festival of the Water Pancakes) was an Aztec festival held every eight years, either in the month of Quecholli (late October-early November) or in Tepeilhuitl (beginning of October). It involved a week-long period of fasting, in which people ate nothing except for a daily midday portion of unseasoned tamales soaked in water. The festival was celebrated in order to allow the food to rest from being treated and cooked, with the belief that in this way the food would be revitalised. It was believed that those who did not celebrate the festival would be struck with leprosy, and thus anyone who did not participate was disciplined. The morning after the festival was known as 'It is sprinkled with the acid of pepper', in honour of the end of the fast.
