= Varallo (surname) =

Varallo is a surname. Notable people with the surname include:

- Anthony Varallo (born 1970), English professor at the College of Charleston
- Francisco Varallo (1910–2010), Argentine football forward player
- Marcello Varallo (born 1947), Italian alpine skier
- Mary Varallo (1897–1979), American politician

== See also ==
- Varallo (disambiguation)
