= Pamonha =

Traditional Brazilian food

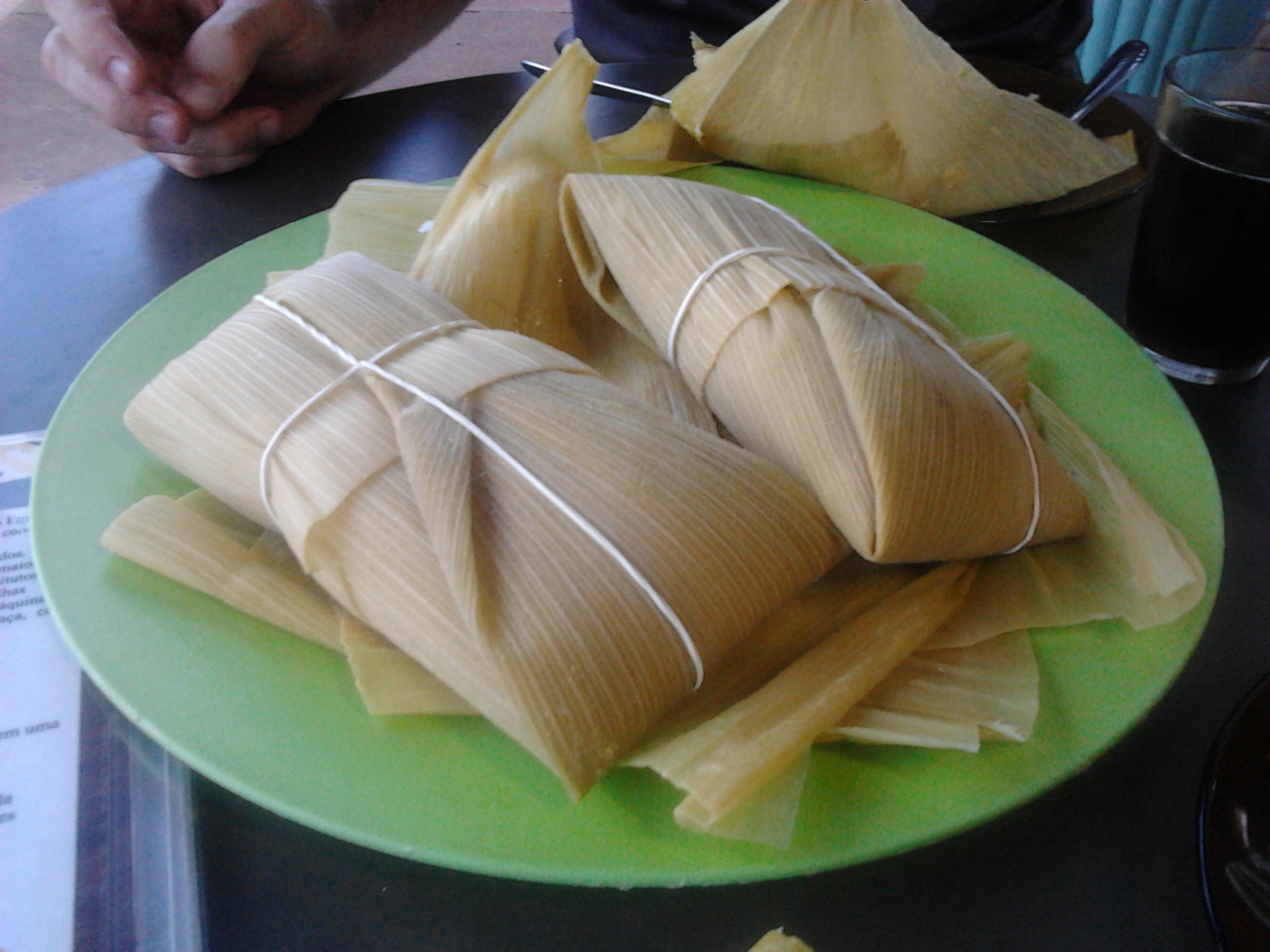
- Place of origin: Brazil
- Region or state: Nordeste, Minas Gerais, Goiás
- Serving temperature: Warm
- Main ingredients: Ground sweet corn, sugar, coconut milk.
- Similar dishes: Tamales, humitas

Pamonha (Portuguese pronunciation: [pɐˈmõɲɐ]) is a traditional Brazilian food. It is a boiled paste made from sweet corn whisked in coconut milk, typically served wrapped in corn husks.

The dish is said to have been introduced to Brazil by enslaved Africans. It is popularly served at the midwinter Festas Juninas. It can be presented as a sweet dish or with savory accompaniments, including cheese or sausage.

== See also ==
- Bollos (Panamanian cuisine)
- Chimaki, from Japan
- Humita
- List of Brazilian dishes
- Tamales, a similar dish made from a type of dry corn flour
- Zongzi, from China
- Koba akondro
- Hallacas, from Venezuela
