= XLNT Foods =

Food company in California, US

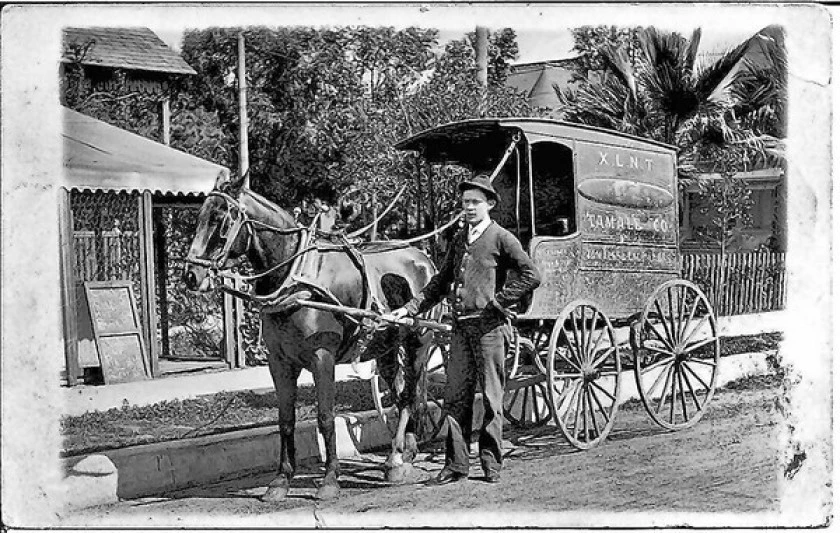
- XLNT Tamale Co. horse-drawn delivery wagon, 1906
- Formerly: XLNT Tamale Company
- Industry: Mexican cuisine
- Founded: 1894; 132 years ago
- Founder: Alejandro Morales
- Products: Tamales, chili con carne
- Website: xlntfoods.com

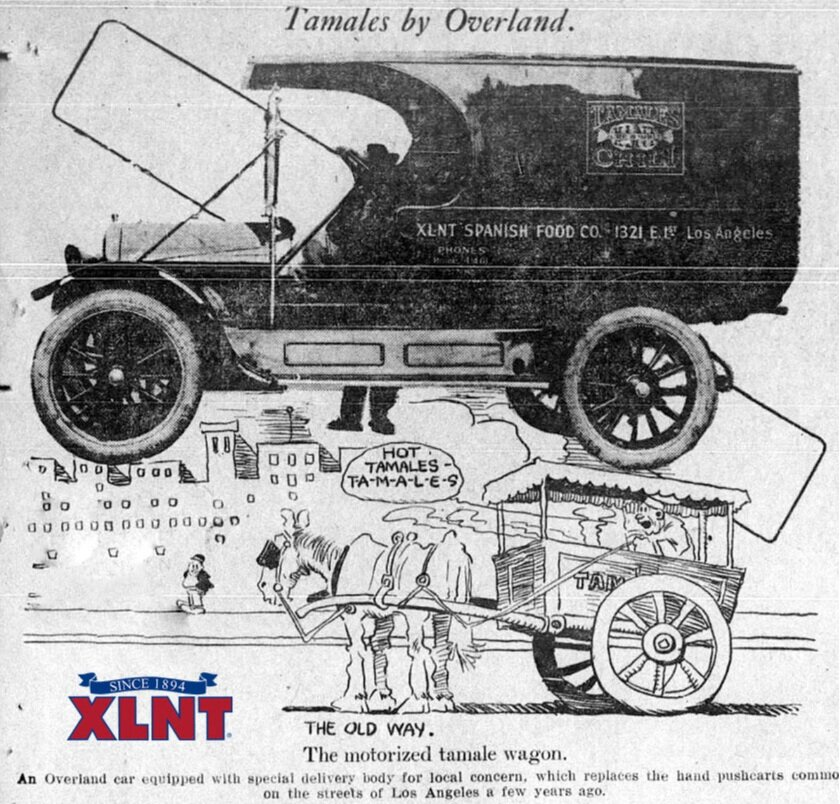
1915 advertisement for XLNT Foods showing a motorized delivery wagon

XLNT Foods (pronounced "excellent") is an American food company based in Southern California. It is one of the oldest companies based in Southern California, and is the longest continuously operating brand of Mexican cuisine in the United States. In the mid-20th century, the company shifted to selling frozen tamales and chili con carne.

== History ==
XLNT Foods was founded in 1894 by Alejandro Morales as the XLNT Tamale Company. Their tamales became a popular ethnic food in Los Angeles. Their food were originally sold in Los Angeles by tamaleros out of horse-drawn wagons. The company waspart of a trend which began in the 1870s, of horse-drawn wagon food cart businesses in Los Angeles. XLNT had a factory in Boyle Heights and also sold tamales from horse-drawn carts and grocery stores. In 1908, Charles Crawford, of Canadian and Dutch descent, took over the ownership of the company. At the height of their operation, the company produced 60 food products.

In the mid-20th century, XLNT products were popular as convenience foods alongside TV dinners. In the 1960s, the company was acquired by Alex Foods, a company that also produced tamales and flavored corn chips in Southern California. A softball team in Santa Barbara, California active c. 1960 was sponsored by XLNT Foods. In 2010, the company changed hands again and was bought by Santa Fe Importers. As of 2011, the company still uses their 1906 tamale recipe.

The company's food products were originally only available in Southern California, but in 2021, an online storefront was launched alongside nationwide shipping via the United Parcel Service. The website also sells XLNT merchandise. The company is now based in Long Beach, California.
