= Wolf Brand Chili =

Brand of chili

Wolf Brand Chili is a brand of chili con carne currently owned by ConAgra Foods. It is available either with or without beans.

== History of the brand ==
In 1895, Lyman T. Davis of Corsicana, Texas, sold "Lyman's Famous Chili" for five cents a bowl from the back of a wagon parked on the streets in downtown Corsicana, usually in front of the Blue Front Saloon on Beaton Street. Davis later began canning his chili and marketing it in the immediate area, produced by his company, Lyman's Pure Food Products. It was about that time that he adopted the brand name "Lyman's Famous Wolf Brand Chili", a name in honor of his pet wolf, Kaiser Bill.

In 1924, Lyman sold the Wolf brand to J. C. West and Fred Slauson who began expanding the area of distribution for the chili beyond Corsicana. Salesmen drove distinctive can-shaped trucks labeled with the chili's name, sometimes with Davis' pet wolf in a cage in the back. The vehicle not only provided practical transportation for company salesmen but also was an effective mobile advertisement for their products.

During World War II, families from Texas sent cans of chili to their sons in service. As demand increased after the war, the factory added chili products such as hot dog sauce, turkey with beans, and lean beef chili.

In 1950, Fred Slauson, a gifted artist, sold his half of the company to Doyle and James West then moved to New Mexico to paint. In 1954 the Corsicana company expanded into interstate markets, having previously distributed its products only in Texas.

In 1957 Quaker Oats of Chicago purchased Wolf Brand from then owners Doyle and James West. Quaker Oats continued to operate the Corsicana plant, continuing to use Davis's original recipe. In 1977 Wolf Brand, along with other chili manufacturers, successfully lobbied the Texas legislature to have chili proclaimed the official "state food" of Texas.

In an effort to consolidate its operations, Quaker Oats closed the Corsicana plant in 1985 and merged its operations with another subsidiary, Stokely-Van Camp, in Dallas. ConAgra acquired Van Camp's and Wolf Brand from Quaker Oats in 1995.

Davis died in 1954, Slauson in 1962, and West in 1963. All three are buried in Oakwood Cemetery in Corsicana. Doyle and Doris Newton West had two sons and a daughter: Conan Doyle West, Patricia Ann West and Jay Conrad West. James and Lois Toone West had three daughters, Dianne Sherrard West, Joanne Tinkle West, and Bonnie Rebecca West. Doyle died in 1997 and James died in 2002.

== Slogan ==
Wolf Brand Chili's trademarked slogan, "Neighbor, how long has it been since you had a big, thick, steaming bowl of Wolf Brand Chili? Well, that's too long!" is familiar to many Texans.
