= Humita =

Pre-Hispanic steamed corn dish in South America

Humintas
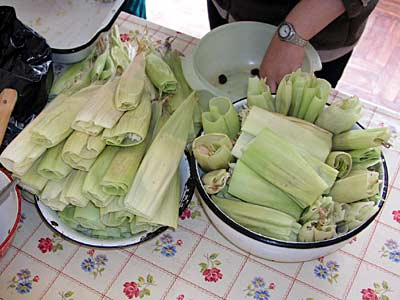
- Place of origin: Andean states
- Main ingredients: Maize, maize husk
- Variations: Multiple

Huminta (from Quechua umint'a), huma (from Quechua possibly uma head) or humita (possibly employing the Spanish diminutive -ita) is a dish that dates back to pre-Hispanic times. A traditional food, it can be found in Peru, Bolivia, Chile, Ecuador, and Northwest Argentina. It consists of fresh choclo (maize) pounded to a paste, wrapped in a fresh corn husk, and slowly steamed or boiled in a pot of water. In Bolivia, it is known as huminta and in Brazil as pamonha. Humitas are similar to Mexican uchepos, or tamales colados, which are also made with fresh corn; but they are only superficially similar to tamales, which are made with nixtamalized corn (masa). Colombia's envueltos or bollos are also similar to humitas. They share a link to the juane ("Saint John's head"), which can be made with corn (sara juane) but is modernly made with rice.

== In Argentina ==
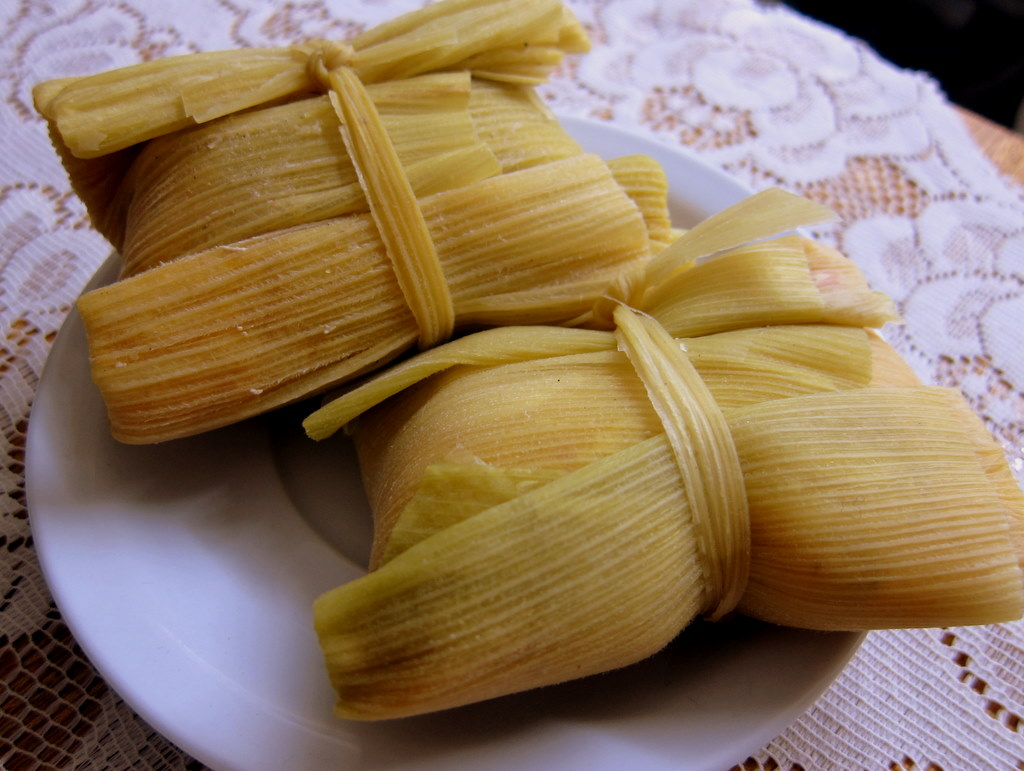
Humitas en chala (in corn husks)

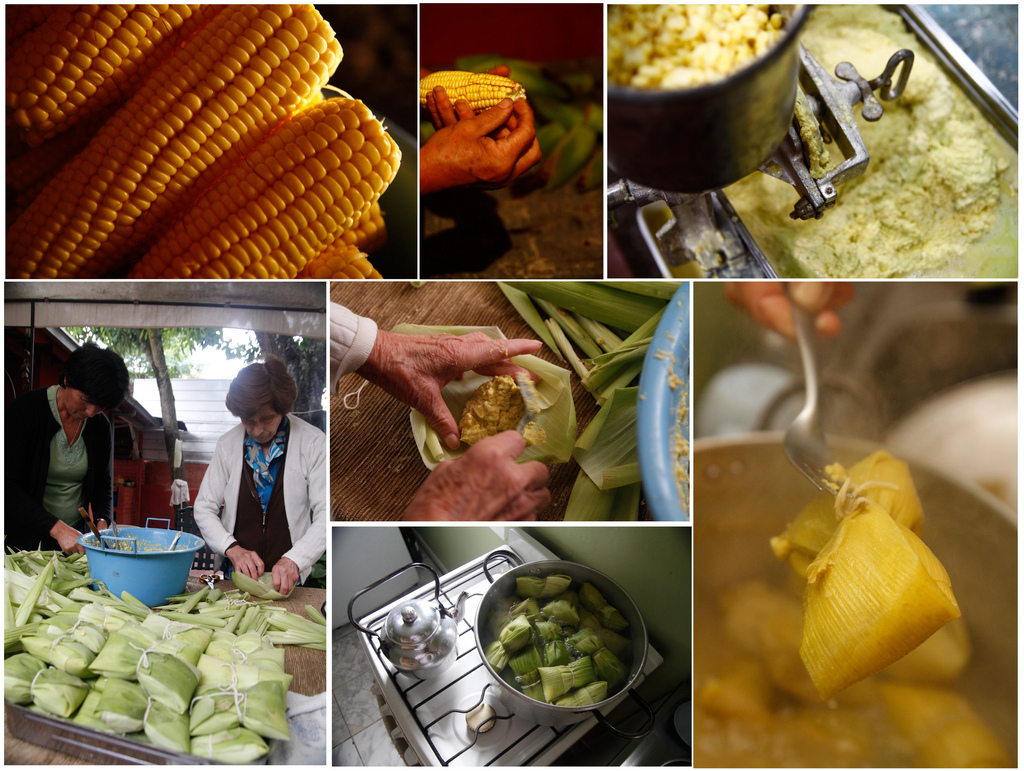

In Argentina, humitas are prepared in two main ways: humita a la olla (in a pot) and humita en chala (in corn husks). For humita a la olla, the corn kernels are grated to create a smooth, creamy mixture, though some prefer to grind the kernels with modern machines. This process leaves behind the skins of the kernels, resulting in a less smooth texture. The mixture may also be combined with criollo pumpkin (a type of green-skinned squash), and milk is sometimes added if the corn is dry. The cream is then sautéed with onions, and sometimes bell pepper, and seasoned with salt, basil, paprika, and cumin. The mixture is cooked in a pot. Once served, it can be topped with melted creamy cheese, although this is optional.

For humita en chala, the corn mixture is placed inside two clean corn husks, arranged in a cross shape to form a small package. The package is tied with strips of husk and boiled in salted water for about an hour. Typically, small chunks of creamy cheese, white cheese or goat cheese are added to the filling, which is more common in the northern regions of Argentina. Humita never contains any type of meat. Given the natural sweetness of corn, two varieties of humitas are common: sweet and salty, the latter prepared without adding extra salt. For the sweet version, sugar is often added to the mixture before cooking. They can be found in restaurants and markets in Jujuy, Tucumán, Salta, and other northern provinces of Argentina.

== In Chile ==
Humitas in Chile are prepared with fresh corn, onion, basil, and butter or lard. They are wrapped in corn husks and baked or boiled. The humitas are tied with thread or twine to keep them together while cooking. They can be made savory or sweet, and are traditionally served with added sugar or tomato. In Chile, humitas are traceable back to the 19th century.

== In Ecuador ==
Ecuadorian humitas are prepared with fresh ground corn and onions, eggs, pork fat and spices that vary from region to region, and also by each family's tradition. The dough is wrapped in a corn husk, but is steamed rather than baked or boiled. Ecuadorian humitas may also contain cheese. This dish is so traditional in Ecuador that they have developed special pots just for cooking humitas. Ecuadorian humitas can be salty or sweet. It is common to fry them in a pan just before eating.

== In the Andes ==
In the central Andes region of Peru and Bolivia, humitas are prepared with fresh corn combined with lard and salt and queso fresco for a savory dish or with fresh corn with lard, sugar, cinnamon and raisins for a sweet dish. Savory humitas may also be prepared with anise. These are typically very rare in other parts of South America.

== In Peru ==
These humitas are prepared with corn wrapped in corn husks and can be cooked in boiling water, placed in a pachamanca oven, or steamed. They can be wrapped in several ways.

One of the earliest references to humita in Peru was written by the Inca Garcilaso de la Vega in his Comentarios Reales de los Incas, which he published in Lisbon in 1609. In talking about humita, he describes his own memories of consuming it while he was living in Peru between 1539 and 1560. From this, it can be deduced that humita was already being prepared in Peru during this time.

== See also ==
- Binaki
- Hallacas
- Pamonhas
- Pasteles
- Sarmales
