= Varallo's =

Restaurant information
- Established: 1907
- Owner: Bob Peabody
- Previous owners: Frank Varallo Sr. Frank Varallo Jr. Todd Varallo
- Food type: Southern, chili
- Location: 239 Fourth Ave. N., Nashville, Tennessee, 37219, USA

Varallo's was the oldest continuously operating restaurant in Tennessee, founded as a chili parlor by Frank Varallo Sr. in 1907. From 1994 to 1998, there were two locations. Frank Varallo Jr. took over from his father in 1929, and a second Varallo's was opened by his two grandsons, Todd and Tony Varallo, near the entrance to the Nashville Arcade on Fourth Avenue. Frank Varallo Jr. closed his Church Street location upon his retirement in 1998, at the age of 85.

== History ==
Frank Varallo Sr. immigrated to the US from Viggiano, Italy. After several years as an interpreter at Ellis Island, Varallo moved to Nashville, Tennessee to pursue a career in music as a violinist. A hunting accident ended his music career, so Varallo set up a chili cart inside a Fourth Avenue saloon. With the success of his chili recipe, Varallo opened his restaurant in 1907 at 708 Broadway, now the location of Hume-Fogg High School. He was immediately in competition with Melfi's, which had been operating since 1896, and Vietti's, which opened in 1898. Other chili parlors opened in later years, but today only Varallo's Restaurant remains, although Vietti chili continues in production in cans. Varallo's moved to Church Street in 1919, and remained on Church Street for almost 80 years. Frank Varallo Sr. died in 1929, and his 15-year-old son Frank Varallo Jr. began co-managing the restaurant with brother Nick. Nick left in 1938 to open another restaurant. The Church Street restaurant was closed when Varallo Jr. retired on December 31, 1998.

The current location on Fourth Avenue was opened in 1994 by Todd Varallo with his brother, Tony. Todd is a grandson of Frank Varallo Jr., who continued after his retirement to help at the Fourth Avenue restaurant until his death in 2007. In December 2019, Todd sold the business to local businessman Bob Peabody, the first person outside the Varallo family to own Varallo's. On February 26, 2026, it was reported that it would be shutting down.

== Menu ==
Varallo's claims to still use the original 1907 chili recipe. The restaurant is particularly known for "three-way" chili, which is a layered combination of spaghetti, tamales and chili. However, Varallo's is open for breakfast, with typical breakfast fare including pancakes, French toast, and sausage gravy on biscuits. Aside from chili, the lunch menu includes "meat and three" options such as meatloaf, fried chicken, catfish, turkey with dressing, turnip greens and meatballs.
