= Tamale Guy =

Mexican-American cook and mobile caterer

- Born: Claudio Velez c. 1964; Acapulco
- Website: www.tamaleguy.com

Claudio Velez, often referred to as the Tamale Guy, Authentic Tamale Guy or the Tamale Man, is a cook and mobile caterer of tamales in Chicago. Originally from Acapulco, Mexico, Velez has a longstanding reputation in the city's North Side nightlife as a food provider outside and inside of clubs, bars, and other establishments open late at night. He has been called "Santa Claus for the drunk and hungry" and sells up to 250 pork, chicken or cheese tamales a night. A mobile app through a Twitter account was developed by a customer intended to help others track his location across the city.

== 2020 events ==
In 2020, during the COVID-19 pandemic, with bars closed to the public, Velez began testing home delivery, and by April 2020, neighborhood groups were placing large orders for tamales. By August 13 Velez had opened a restaurant, which due to popularity had customers waiting in a line 10 blocks long on opening day. On August 29, media reported that Velez had contracted COVID-19 and was on a ventilator. On October 1, he had recovered and a GoFundMe fundraiser for his medical bills had raised tens of thousands of dollars. While Velez was hospitalized a Naperville brewery named a limited edition beer after him. Velez later closed his restaurant and moved into shared spaces, first at Lone Wolf in the West Loop, and then in Bangers & Lace, and in 2022 again to a new Logan Square bar called Quality Time.
