= Tamale =

Traditional Mesoamerican dish

Tamales
- Wrapped and unwrapped tamales oaxaqueños (from Oaxaca, Mexico) filled with mole negro and chicken
- Course: Main course
- Place of origin: Mexico, Guatemala
- Region or state: Mesoamerica
- Created by: Mesoamericans
- Main ingredients: Corn (maize) masa, banana leaves, corn husks
- Variations: Corunda, guajolota, uchepos, zacahuil
- Similar dishes: Humitas, pamonha, hallaca

A tamal or tamale is a traditional Mesoamerican dish made of masa, a dough made from nixtamalized corn, which is steamed in a corn husk or banana leaves. The wrapping can either be discarded prior to eating or used as a plate. Tamales can be filled with meats, cheeses, fruits, vegetables, herbs, chilies, or any preparation according to taste, and both the filling and the cooking liquid may be seasoned.

Tamale is an anglicized version of the Spanish word tamal (plural: tamales). Tamal comes from the Nahuatl tamalli.

The English "tamale" is a back-formation from tamales, with English speakers applying English pluralization rules, and thus interpreting the -e- as part of the stem, rather than part of the plural suffix -es.

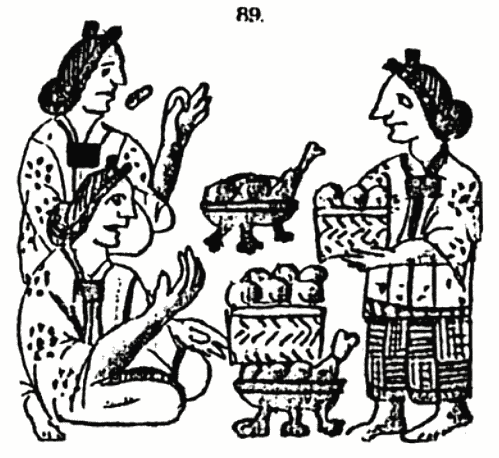
Tamales served to honor the birth of a child. (Florentine Codex)

== Origin ==
Tamales originated in Mesoamerica as early as 8000 to 5000 BC.

The preparation of tamales is likely to have spread from the indigenous cultures in Mesoamerica to the rest of the Americas. According to archaeologists Karl Taube, William Saturno, and David Stuart, tamales may date from around 100 AD. They found pictorial references in the Mural of San Bartolo, in Petén, Guatemala.

The Aztec and Maya civilizations, as well as the Olmec and Toltec before them, used tamales as easily portable food for hunting trips, traveling large distances, and nourishing their armies. Tamales were also considered sacred, as they were seen as the food of the gods. The Aztec, Maya, Olmecs, and Toltecs as peoples considered corn as a central part of their cultural identity, so tamales played a large part in their rituals and festivals.

== Mesoamerica ==
=== Aztec ===
The different forms of tamales eaten and sold in Aztec markets are well documented in the extensive Florentine Codex written by Reverend Bernardino de Sahagún. In book X he describes how Aztec tamales used a variety of corn for their flour base and were cooked in earth ovens, or olla, which were heated by the steam of dried cane grown and harvested for the express purpose of cooking tamales. Fillings would consist of meat (turkey, fish, frog, axolotl, gopher), fruit, bean, squash seed, turkey egg and even no filling. They would be seasoned with chilis or seeds if they were savory and honey if they were sweet.

Tamales also held great religious and spiritual importance within Aztec culture. It was customary for Aztec women to stay up for two to three days cooking tamales before a wedding. (Codex, Book IX). In terms of festivities, the most notable was Uauhquiltamalcualiztli, which was celebrated during the 18th month of the calendar round. The name of the celebration translates to 'The Eating of Tamales Stuffed with Amaranth Greens' and was a celebration of the fire deity Ixcozauhqui. Another significant ritual for the Aztecs was the feast of Atamalcualiztli (eating of water tamales). This ritual, held every eight years for a whole week, was done by eating tamales without any seasoning, spices, or filling, which allowed the maize freedom from being overworked in the usual tamale cooking methods.

=== Maya (pre-Columbian) ===
In the pre-Columbian era, the Mayas ate tamales and often served them at feasts and festivals. The Classic Maya hieroglyph for tamales has been identified on pots and other objects dating back to the Classic Era (200–1000 AD), although they likely were eaten much earlier. Tamales appear often in ceramic ware from the Mayan Classic era (200–1000 AD). The Fenton vase shows a plate of unwrapped tamales being offered as a penance to a powerful Mayan nobleman. While tortillas are the basis for the contemporary Maya diet, remarkably little evidence exists for tortilla production among the Classic period Maya. A lack of griddles in the archaeological record suggests that the primary foodstuff of the Mesoamerican diet may have been the tamal, a cooked, vegetal-wrapped mass of maize dough. Tamales are cooked without the use of ceramic technologies and therefore the form of the tamale is thought to predate the tortilla. Similarities between the two maize products can be found in both the ingredients, preparation techniques, and the linguistic ambiguity exhibited by the pan-Mayan term wa referring to a basic, daily consumed maize product that can refer to either tortillas or tamales.

=== Toltec ===
While the exact origin of tamales has yet to be determined, the oldest people confirmed to have eaten them were the Toltecs, as archaeologists have found fossilized corn husks around the Pyramid of the Sun and the Pyramid of the Moon in Teotihuacan. (c. 250 BC – 750 AD)

== Central America ==
=== Panama ===
In Panamanian cuisine, tamal de olla, which is Spanish for "tamale of the pot/pan," is best described as a Panamanian-style tamale that fills the baking pan in which it is cooked, and is not wrapped in a banana or plantain leaf. The ingredients include pork or chicken cooked with corn-stuffed cornmeal (with "maiz nuevo"), vegetables (onion, tomato, and bell pepper), olives, and raisins. Some also add chopped prunes.

=== Costa Rica ===
Costa Rican tamales are typically eaten around the Christmas holiday. They may be made from corn masa, plantain, or rice, and are wrapped in banana or plantain leaves. Fillings can vary but include chicken, pork, vegetables, and beans.

=== El Salvador ===
Tamales are a traditional dish in El Salvador. Tamales are typically eaten during holidays, like Christmas. Salvadoran tamales have a corn masa base and are wrapped in banana leaves. They contain fillings like chicken, vegetables, and/or beans. Corn tamales, or tamales de elote, are also popular. Bean tamales, or tamales pisques, are also consumed, typically during Holy Week.

=== Guatemala ===
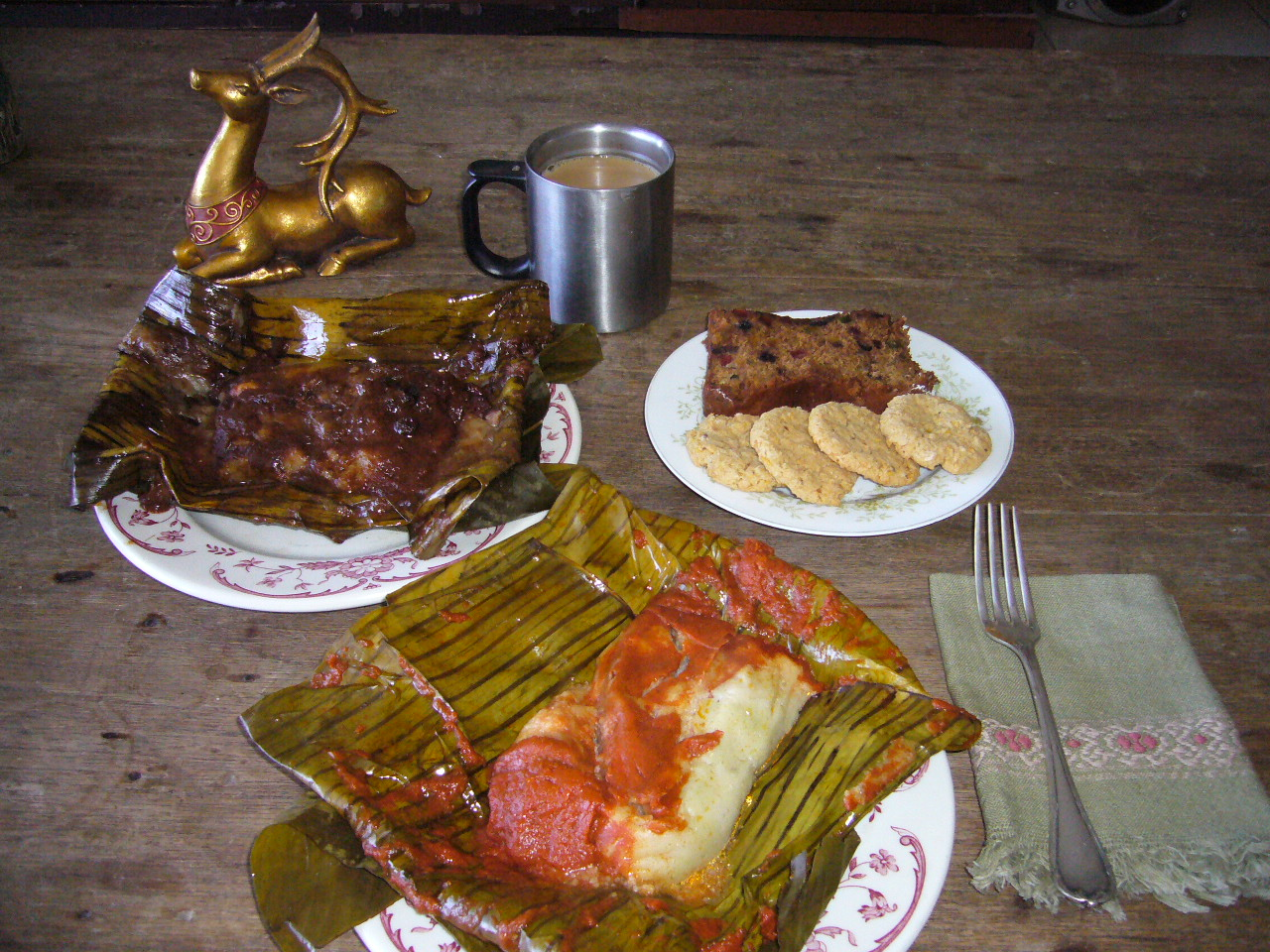
Black and red tamales in Guatemala

==== Pre-Columbian Guatemala ====
In the classical times of the Maya of Central America (Guatemala in particular), the great Mayan lords delighted in a baked dough bun during the winter solstice, made of maize mixed with turkey, tepezcuintle (lowland paca) or venison, spices, and chili pepper, among other ingredients.

This meal was later integrated into modern Guatemalan traditions. For example, on Christmas Eve, families prepare black, red, or sweet tamales for family and friends to show gratitude. The tamales are often accompanied with chocolate, yolk bread, and punch, and participate in the Mass of Gallo, at midnight.

In Guatemala, eating tamales at midnight on December 24 and 31 is customary. Guatemalans also eat tamales for holiday celebrations, birthdays, and baptisms, so the tamale is considered an important dish in the culture of Guatemala.

Guatemala has many tamale varieties, from the traditional corn-husked tamale called a chuchito, to a sweet version of tamale, which uses the same corn dough, but is seasoned with honey or sugar combined with chocolate, almonds, plums, seeds, and peppers. Tamales are sold in stores and private homes (especially on Saturdays). A red light on a home at night is a sign that tamales are for sale at that home.

==== Varieties ====
- Red tamales owe their color to achiote and tomato and are made with corn dough stuffed with recado rojo, raisins, chili peppers, chicken, beef or pork wrapped in banana leaves.
- Cambray- tamales contain raisins and almonds. Sweet tamales are filled with sweet recado rojo. Black tamales are named after the color that chocolate gives them. Chipilin tamales wrapped in corn husks, parrot tamales, and corn tamales among others are also made. Cream tamales and cheese and anise seeds are also mixed with corn tamales.
- Chuchito is a typical and emblematic dish of Guatemala. It is a variation of the tamale made with corn dough, but a firmer consistency, although lard can be added to the dough to generate a more pleasant taste and consistency. It is usually mixed with recado rojo of tomato and with a filling that can be with chicken, beef, or pork. It is wrapped with dried cob leaves (tusa or bender). In some places, it is accompanied by cheese, sauce, or both.
- Rice tamales come from the Guatemalan highlands, where the typical corn dough is replaced by a thick dough of annealed rice with water and salt. The preparation of the recado rojo does not differ much from the original, since only some regions have the ingredients with which it is made.
- Paches is a tamale particularly from the highlands of Guatemala that uses potato instead of maize for the dough.
- Tamal or tamalito is dough only, with no meats or other fillings. This dish is used to accompany a meal and used to scoop food on the plate, or just eaten plain along with the main dish.

=== Nicaragua ===
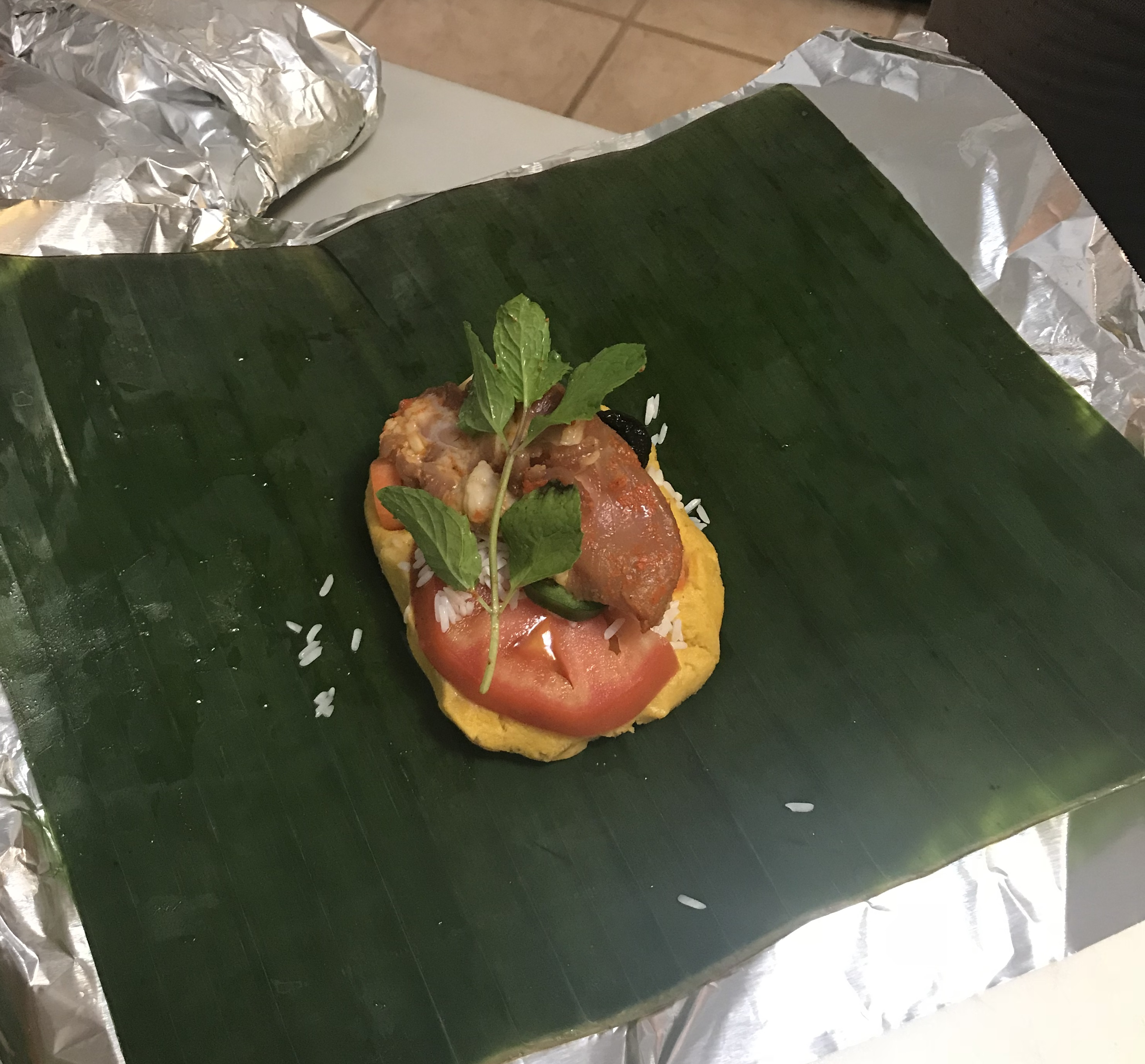
Nacatamal with both banana leaf and aluminum foil wrapping

The most popular version of the Tamal in Nicaragua is the nacatamal and sometimes serves as an entire meal in itself. It is a traditional dish with indigenous origins. The name comes from the Nawat language spoken by the Nicarao, who were situated on the Southern Pacific coast of Nicaragua, and translates to "meat tamale". The nacatamal is perhaps the most produced within traditional Nicaraguan cuisine and it is an event often reserved for Sundays at mid-morning. It is usually eaten together with fresh bread and coffee. Enjoying nacatamales during special occasions and to invite extended family and neighbors to also partake is a common occurrence.

Nacatamales are much larger in size in comparison to their counterparts, and made up of mostly nixtamalized corn masa (a kind of dough traditionally made from a process called nizquezar) and lard). The masa and liquified concoction of onion, garlic, tomato, salt, achiote (annatto), naranja agria and bell pepper is cooked and the result becomes the base for the nacatamal and it is also referred to as masa. This base is ladled onto plantain leaves used for wrapping into large individual portions. The filling usually consists of annatto-seasoned pork meat, rice, slices of potatoes, bell peppers, tomatoes, and onions; olives, spearmint sprigs, and chile congo, a very small, egg-shaped chile found in Nicaragua. On occasion, prunes, raisins, or capers can be added. The masa and filling are then wrapped in plantain leaves, tied with a string, and made into pillow-shaped bundles – nacatamales. They are then steamed or pressure-cooked for several hours. The entire process is very labor-intensive, and it often requires preparation over the course of two days; involving the whole family may be needed to complete it.

==== Varieties ====
- Pizque are a much simpler version of a tamal in Nicaragua, they are wrapped in a banana leaf, and are eaten with cheese and cooked red beans.
- Pizque Relleno have a sweet flavor, filled with a mixture of ground beans sweetened with cane sugar or rapadura and are wrapped in banana leaves. They serve as a dessert.
- Yoltamal is made with tender corn grains that gives it a slightly sweet flavor and wrapped in corn husks. It is generally eaten accompanied by quesillo or cheese, and sour cream.
- Yoltamal Relleno is a variety of the above stuffed with a mixture of rapadura and grated or ground cheese.
- Montucas Neosegovianas y Estelianas is a Northern Nicaraguan tamal make with chicken or hen meat, wrapped in a banana leaf and tied.
- Paco is a Western Nicaraguan tamal mostly found in León that consists of masa mixed with mashed green plantain, sugar, honey and salt. It's wrapped in tempisque or fig leaf and cooked.

== North America ==
=== Modern Mexico ===
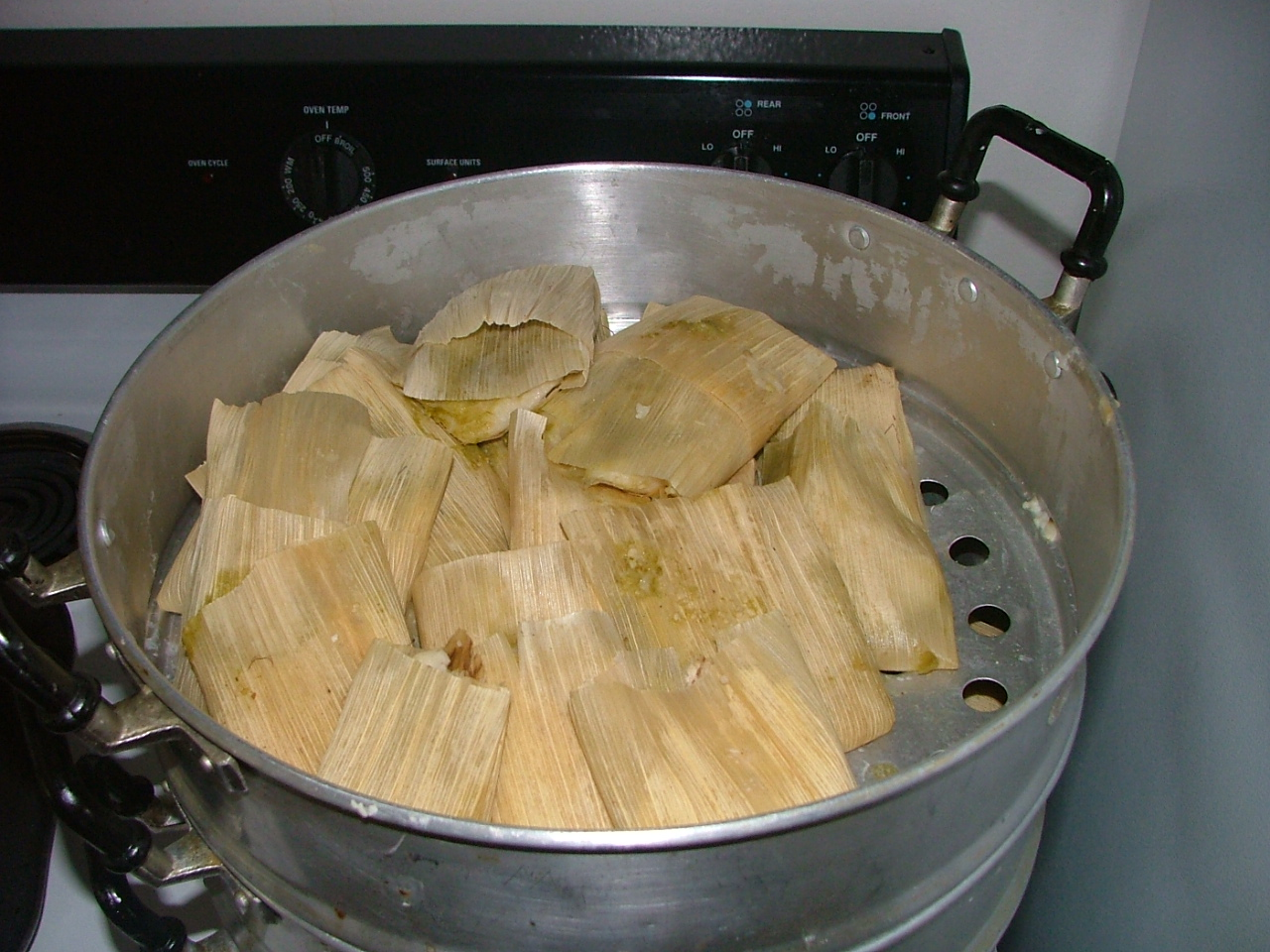
A batch of Mexican tamales in the tamalera

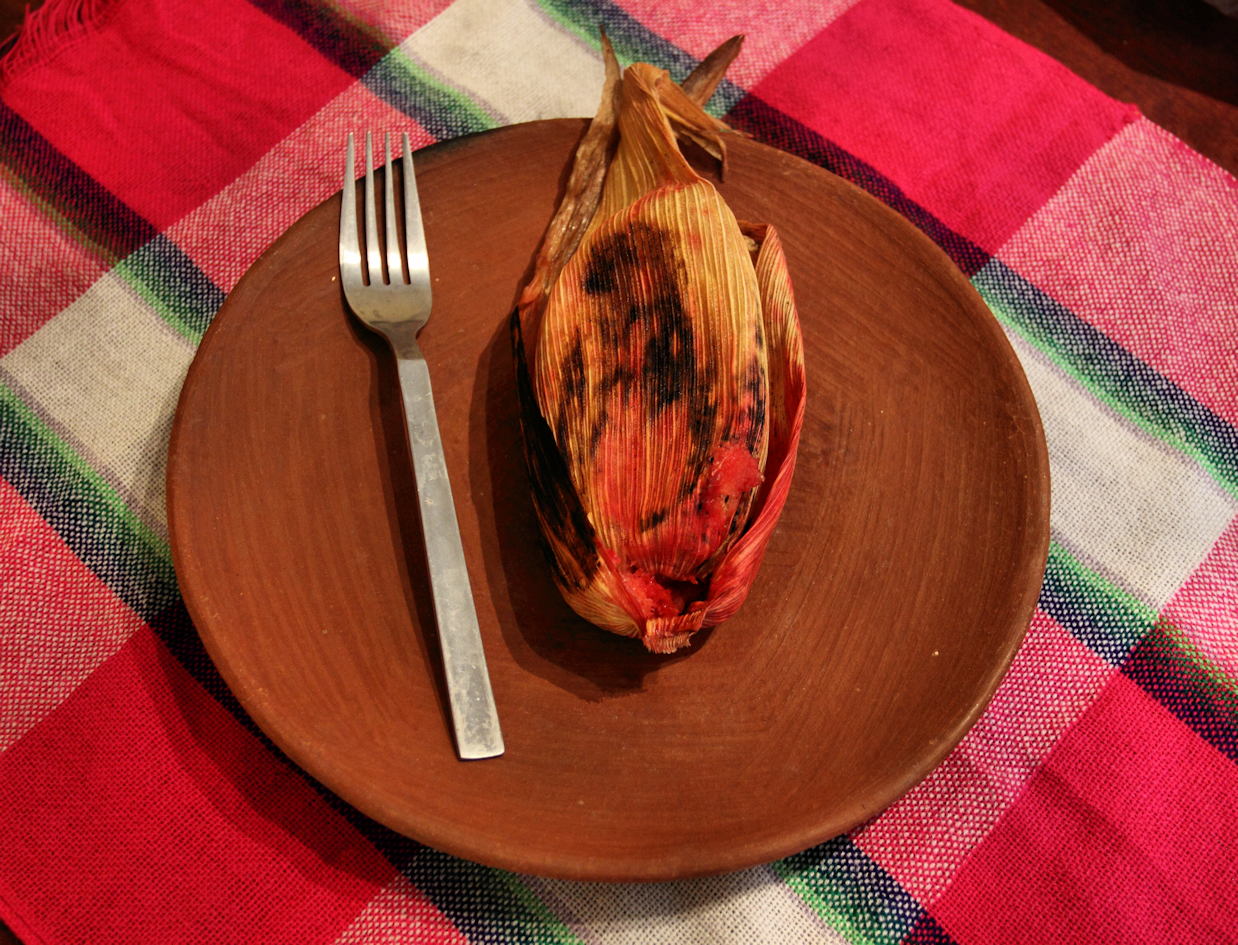
A tamal dulce breakfast tamale from Oaxaca, Mexico. It contains pineapple, raisins and blackberries.

In the present day, it is common in certain Maya areas to steam tamales in a spherical vessel known as a tamalero, as opposed to boiling them; this practice has been linked back to the Classic Maya period due to the presence of boiler scale in Classic Maya pottery. The other common method of cooking tamales was on a comal which is a large flat stone; this method is also used to cook tortillas. In addition to the leaves of plantain and banana which are commonly used today, Mayan tamales were commonly wrapped in the leaves of avocado or piper plants, which would be gathered by men during the rainy season. While meat and fish were the customary fillings of tamales of this era, squash seeds and flowers, and greens such as chaya, or chipilin were also common. Fray Diego de Landa Calderón also spoke of 'special breads' [tamales] which were used specifically as offerings, with fillings such as deer heart, or quail. Because of the convenience offered by tamales, specific tamales were made for hunters and travelers. These tamales were cooked with extra wood ashes in order to create a hard 'shell' around the tamales when dried; this allowed tamales to keep for up to 20 days.

Tamales begin with a dough made from ground nixtamalized corn (hominy), called masa, or alternatively a rehydrated masa powder, such as Maseca. It is combined with lard or vegetable shortening, along with broth or water, to bring the dough to the consistency of a very thick batter. It is traditional to whisk the lard, and whisk the resulting batter, with the intent of producing the signature soft and fluffy texture. Modern recipes may use baking powder to achieve a similar effect. Chili purees or dried chili powders are also occasionally added to the batter, which in addition to the spice can cause some tamales to appear red in color. Tamales are generally wrapped in corn husks or plantain leaves before being steamed, with the choice of husk depending on the region. They usually have a sweet or savory filling and are usually steamed until firm.

Tamale-making is a ritual that has been part of Mexican life since pre-Hispanic times, when special fillings and forms were designated for each specific festival or life event. Today, tamales are typically filled with meats, cheese, or vegetables, especially chilies. Preparation is complex and time-consuming, and an excellent example of Mexican communal cooking, where this task usually falls to the women. Tamales are a favorite comfort food in Mexico, eaten as both breakfast and dinner, and often accompanied by hot atole or champurrado and arroz con leche (rice porridge, "rice with milk") or maize-based beverages of indigenous origin. Street vendors can be seen serving them from huge, steaming, covered pots (tamaleras) or ollas.

Instead of corn husks, banana or plantain leaves are used in tropical parts of the country, such as Oaxaca, Chiapas, Veracruz, and the Yucatán Peninsula. These tamales are rather square in shape, often very large—15 inches (40 cm)—and these larger tamales are commonly known as pibs in the Yucatán Peninsula. Another very large type of tamale is zacahuil, made in the Huasteca region of Mexico. Depending on the size, zacahuil can feed between 50 and 200 people; they are made during festivals and holidays, for quinceañeras, and on Sundays to be sold at the markets.

=== United States ===
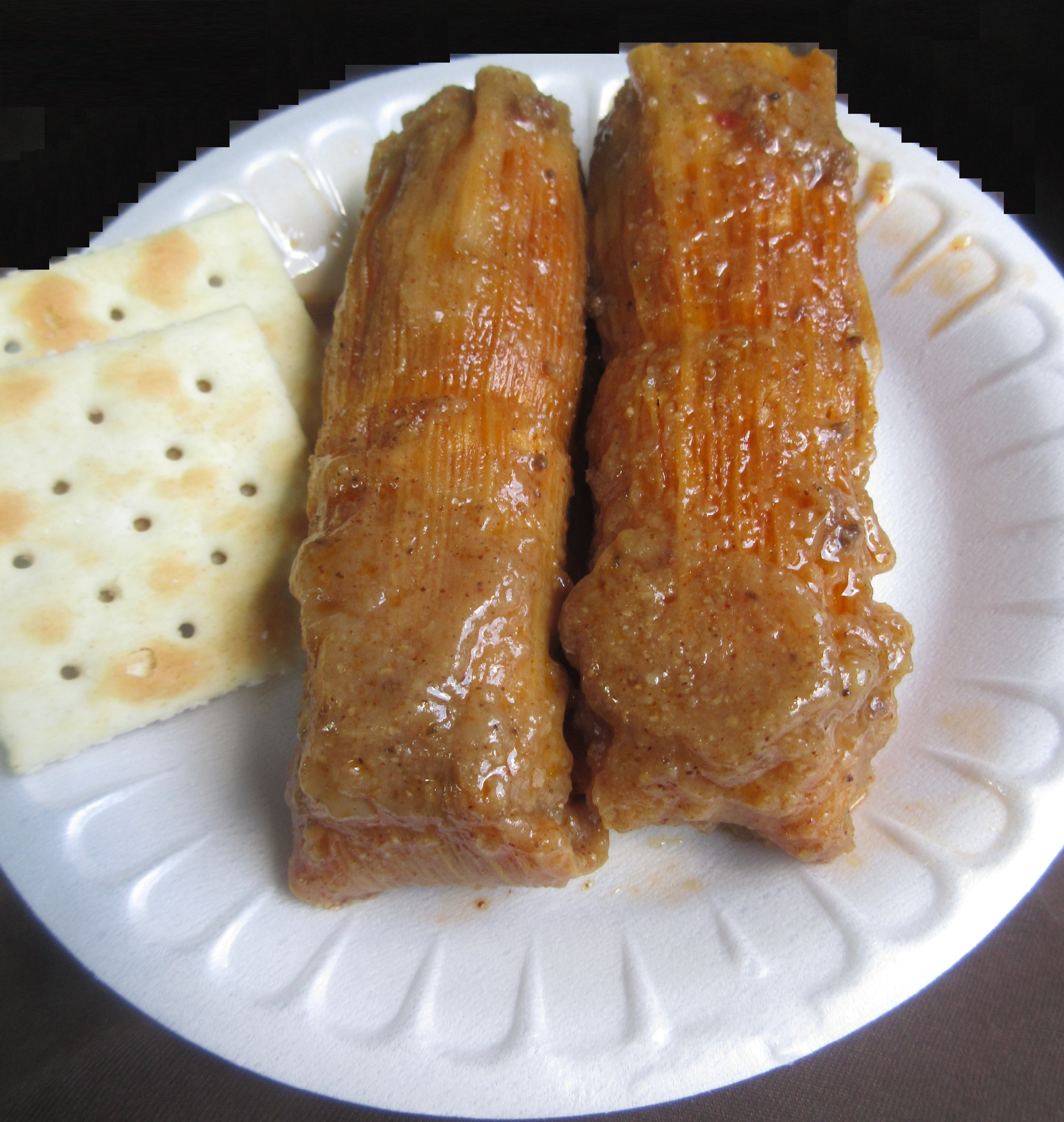
Delta-style tamales from Clarksdale, Mississippi

While Mexican-style and other Latin American-style tamales are featured at foreign food restaurants throughout the United States, some distinctly indigenous styles also are made.

The Choctaw and Chickasaw make a dish called banaha, which can be stuffed or not (plain). Fillings (fried bacon, turkey, venison, nuts, or vegetables such as onions, potatoes, squash, and sweet potatoes) may be mixed with the masa and steamed in a corn husk.

Cherokee tamales, also known as bean bread or "broadswords", were made with hominy (in the case of the Cherokee, the masa was made from corn boiled in water treated with wood ashes instead of lime) and beans, and wrapped in green corn leaves or large tree leaves and boiled, similar to the meatless pre-Columbian bean and masa tamales still prepared in Chiapas, central Mexico, and Guatemala.

In northern Louisiana, tamales have been made for several centuries. The Spanish established presidio Los Adaes in 1721 in modern-day Robeline, Louisiana. The descendants of these Spanish settlers from central Mexico were the first tamale makers to arrive in the eastern US. Zwolle, Louisiana, has a Tamale Fiesta every year in October.

In the Mississippi Delta, African Americans developed a spicy tamale called the hot tamale that is made from cornmeal instead of masa and is boiled in corn husks.

Tamales have been eaten in the broader United States since at least 1893, when they were featured at the World's Columbian Exposition. In 1894, when tamales were the most popular ethnic food in Los Angeles, XLNT Foods started making them. The company is the oldest continuously operating Mexican food brand in the United States, and one of the oldest companies in Southern California.

A tradition of roving tamale sellers was documented in early 20th-century blues music. They are the subject of the well-known 1937 blues/ragtime song "They're Red Hot" by Robert Johnson.

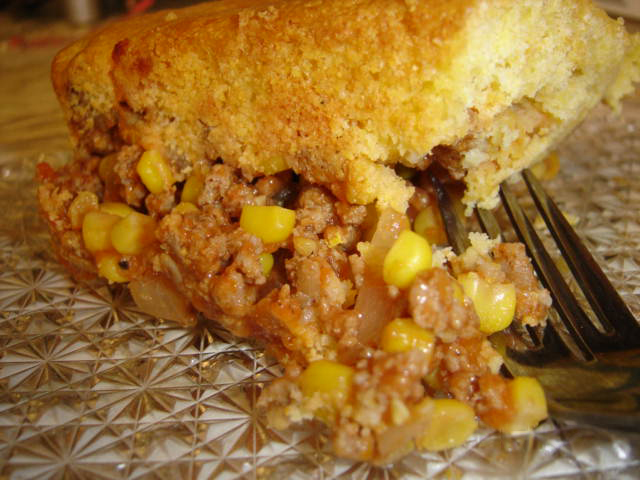
Tamale pie

Around the beginning of the 20th century, the name "tamale pie" was given to meat pies and casseroles made with a cornmeal crust and typical tamale fillings arranged in layers. Although characterized as Mexican food, these forms are not popular in Mexican American culture in which the individually wrapped style is preferred.

The Indio International Tamale Festival held every December in Indio, California, has earned two Guinness World Records: the largest tamale festival (154 000 in attendance, December 2002) and the world's largest tamale, over one foot (0.3 m) in diameter and 40 feet (12.2 m) in length, created by Chef John Sedlar, since beaten by H. Ayuntamiento de Centro Villahermosa (Mexico) in Villahermosa, Tabasco, Mexico, on 25 November 2018. The current record stands at 50.05 m. The 2006 Guinness book calls the festival "the world's largest cooking and culinary festival".

== Caribbean ==
=== Cuba ===
In Cuba, before the 1959 Revolution, street vendors sold Mexican-style tamales wrapped in corn husks, usually made without any kind of spicy seasoning. Cuban tamales being identical in form to those made in Mexico City suggests they were brought over to Cuba during the period of intense cultural and musical exchange between Cuba and Mexico after the 1920s.

A well-known Cuban song from the 1950s, "Los Tamalitos de Olga", (a cha-cha-cha sung by Orquesta Aragón) celebrated the delicious tamales sold by a street vendor in Cienfuegos. A peculiarly Cuban invention is the dish known as tamal en cazuela, basically consisting of tamale masa with the meat stuffing stirred into the masa, and then cooked in a pot on the stove to form a kind of hearty cornmeal porridge.

=== Dominican Republic ===
In the Dominican Republic, guanimo are Dominican tamales stuffed with picadillo. The name guanimo has its origin in the native Taínos.

=== Puerto Rico ===
Guanime is a Puerto Rican dish that can be traced back to pre-Columbian times. It consists of corn masa that is stuffed with beans, seafood, nuts, or meat, and then wrapped in corn husks slowly cooked on a grill.

Guanimes are prepared in a plain version, without the stuffing, and served with stewed salted cod fish. Since the arrival of Europeans, guanimes have lost their stuffing. Contemporary guanimes are made with corn masa seasoned with coconut milk, lard, broth, and annatto, wrapped in a banana leaf or corn husk.

The several versions of guanimes can be made with green plantains, cassava, and a sweet version made with sweet plantains and cornmeal.

The guanime is also related to the pastel, a root tamale dating to around the same time as the native Taíno guanimes.

=== Trinidad and Tobago ===
In Trinidad and Tobago, the dish is called a pastelle and is popular in many households during the entire Christmas season and New Year celebrations. It is usually made with cornmeal and filled with cooked, seasoned meat (chicken and beef being the most popular), raisins, olives, capers, and other seasonings. The entire pastelle is wrapped in a banana leaf, bound with twine and steamed. When fully cooked, the banana leaf is removed to reveal the brightly yellow-colored dish. It is often enjoyed as is or along with a meal. The sweet version is called paymee.

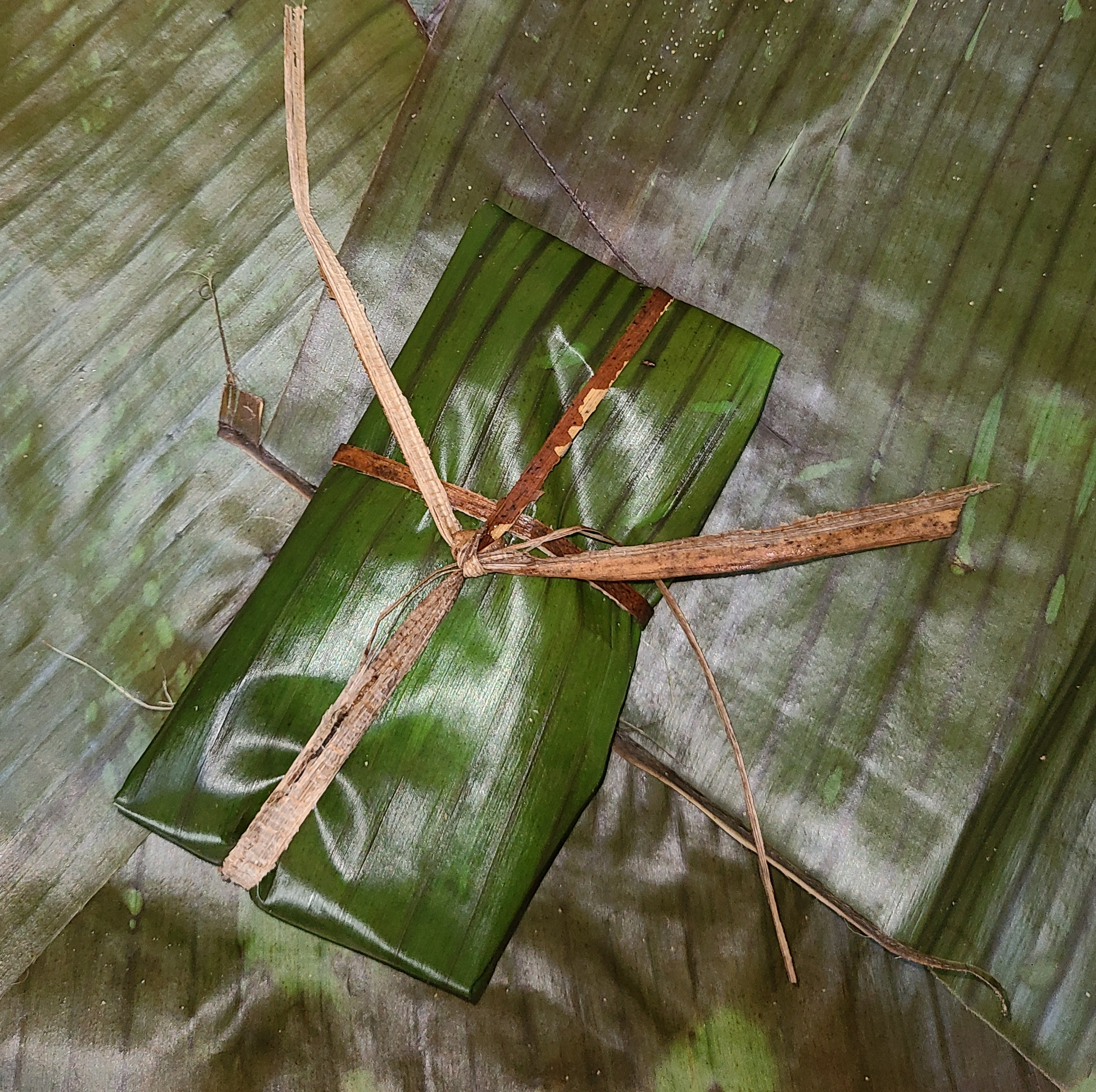
Jamaican tie-a-leaf or blue drawers (duckunoo) in a banana leaf.

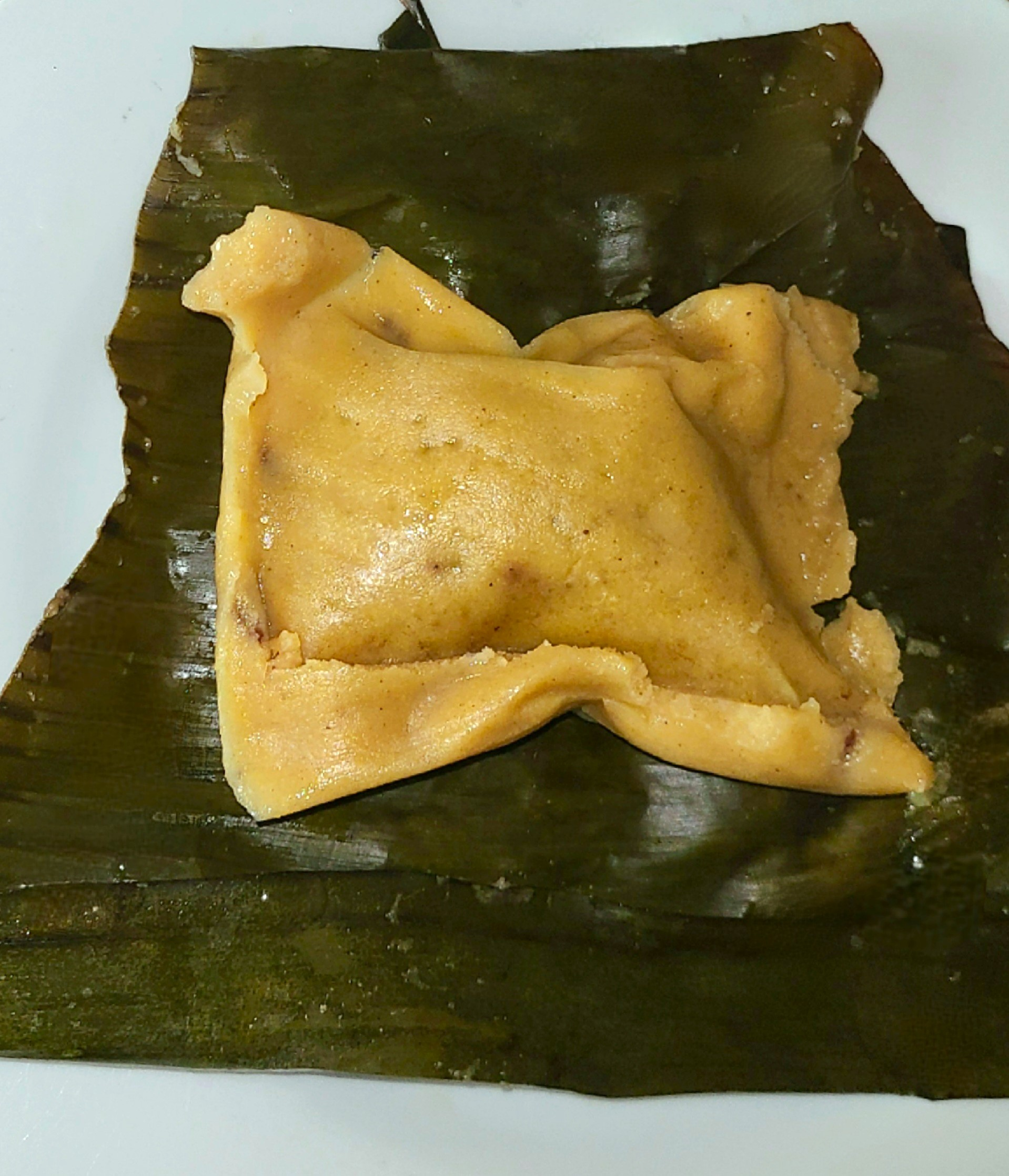
Jamaican tie-a-leaf made with cornmeal, sugar, coconut milk, spices, vanilla and raisins.

=== Jamaica ===
In Jamaica, there is a traditional dessert called duckunoo or duckanoo, also referred to as tie-a-leaf or blue drawers (draws). It is a variation of tamal dulce (sweet tamale), and is typically made with batata or sweet potato, coconut, and/or cornmeal, spices like cinnamon, nutmeg and anise, brown sugar, coconut milk and vanilla. Sometimes, raisins and grated green banana are added. The mixture is tied up in a banana leaf or corn husk, and then cooked in boiling water.

Similarly, it is also made in Belize, Haiti, French Guiana and some other Caribbean islands. Other names include: dokonon (in French Guiana), doukounou (in Haiti), paime (in Trinidad & Tobago), penmi (in St Lucia) and dukunu / ducunu or tamalito (in Belize).

=== Belize ===
The tamale is a staple in Belize, where it is also known as dukunu, a sweet corn tamale that gets its name from the Garifuna people. Dukunus are mostly vegetarian and consist of roasted corn kernels blended with coconut milk as a base. Butter, salt, and sugar are also added. Dukunus filled with different meats are also made.

== South America ==
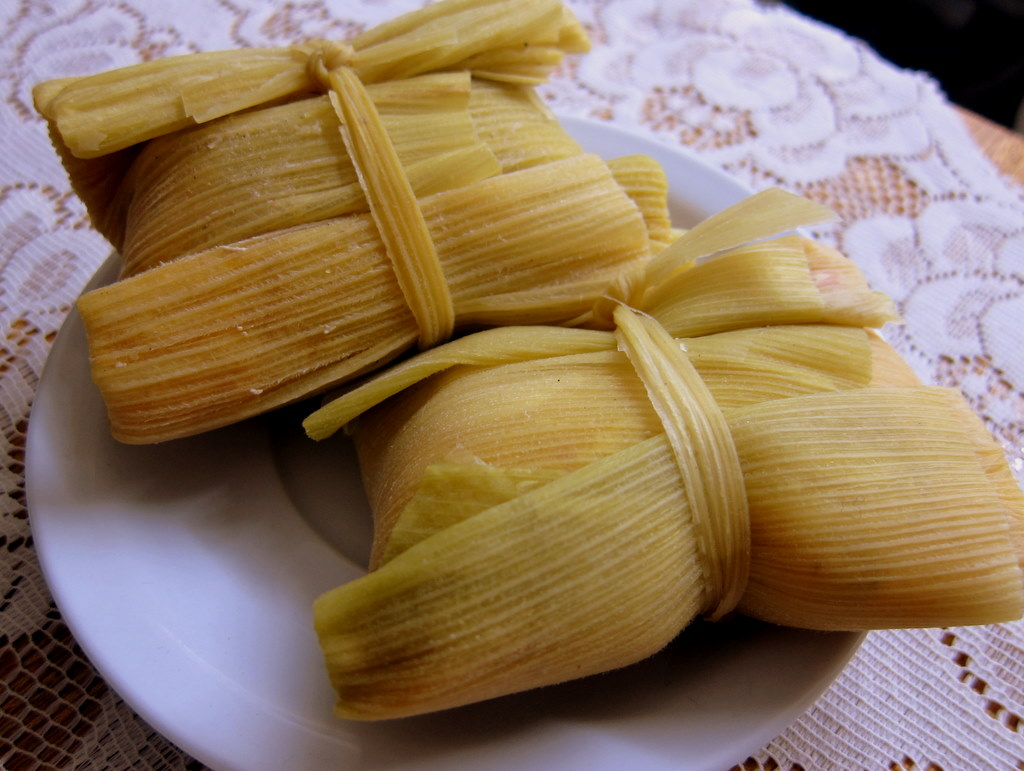
South American-style humitas

Humitas (from Quechua humint'a) is a Native South American dish from pre-Hispanic times, a traditional food from the Andes and it can be found in Colombia, Bolivia, Chile, Ecuador, Peru, and Northwest Argentina. It consists of fresh choclo (Peruvian corn) pounded to a paste, wrapped in a fresh corn husk, and slowly steamed or boiled in a pot of water. In Bolivia it is known as huminta and in Brazil as pamonha, made of fresh, not nixtamalized, corn paste.

=== Venezuela ===
Hallaca is a traditional meal from Venezuela that resembles the aspect of a tamal. It consists of corn dough stuffed with a stew of beef, pork, or chicken and other ingredients such as raisins, capers, and olives, fresh onion rings, red and green bell pepper slices. There are also vegetarian options with black beans or tofu. Hallacas are folded in plantain leaves, tied with strings, and boiled. The dish is traditionally served during the Christmas season and has several regional variants in Venezuela. It has been described as a national dish of Venezuela but it can be found also in variants. A characteristic of the hallaca is the delicate corn dough made with consommé or broth and lard colored with annatto.

=== Peru ===
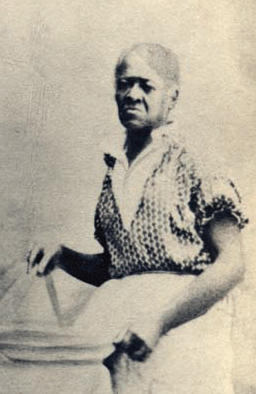
Juan José Cabezudo, a Peruvian chef.

Tamales were one of the dishes that the Peruvian chef Juan José Cabezudo was famous for serving from his food stand near the Plaza Mayor in Lima.

== The Philippines and Guam ==
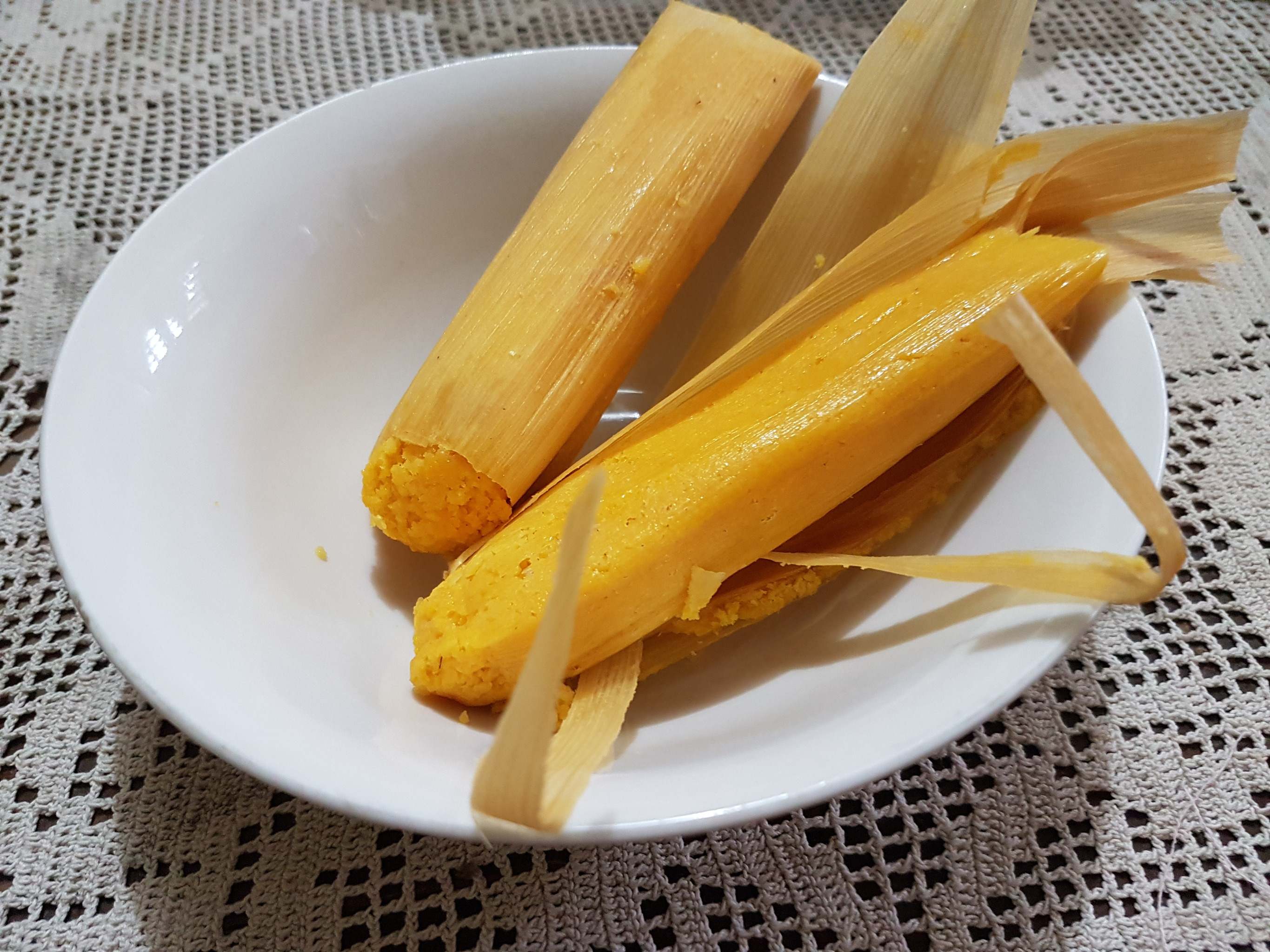
Binaki, a type of sweet tamale from Bukidnon, Philippines

In the Philippines and Guam, which were governed by Spain as a province of Mexico, different forms of tamale-like foods exist. In the Philippines, they merged with the native leaf-wrapped rice cakes (kakanin) and are made with a dough derived from ground rice and are filled with seasoned chicken or pork with the addition of peanuts and other seasonings such as sugar. In some places, such as Pampanga, where it is popularly known as bobotu, and Batangas provinces, the tamales are wrapped in banana leaves, but sweet corn varieties from the Visayas region are wrapped in corn husks similar to the sweet corn tamales of the American Southwest and Mexico. Because of the work involved in the preparation of tamales, they usually only appear during the special holidays or other big celebrations. Various tamal recipes have practically disappeared under the pressures of modern life and the ease of fast food. Several varieties of tamales are also found in the Philippines.

Tamales, tamalis, tamalos, and pasteles are different varieties found throughout the region. Some are sweet, some are savory, and some are sweet and savory. Mostly wrapped in banana leaves and made of rice, either the whole grain or ground and cooked with coconut milk and other seasonings, they are sometimes filled with meat and seafood, or are plain and have no filling. There are certain varieties, such as tamalos, that are made of a sweet corn masa wrapped in a corn husk or leaf. There are also varieties made without masa, like tamalis, which are made with small fish fry wrapped in banana leaves and steamed, similar to the tamales de charal from Mexico, where the small fish are cooked whole with herbs and seasonings wrapped inside a corn husk without masa. The number of varieties has dwindled through the years so certain types of tamales that were once popular in the Philippines have become lost or are simply memories. The variety found in Guam, known as tamales guiso, is made with corn masa and wrapped in corn husks, and as with the Philippine tamales, are clear evidence of the influence of the galleon trade that occurred between the ports of Manila and Acapulco.

== See also ==
- Ada (food)
- Lepet
- Laulau
- Botok
- Conkies
- Duckunoo
- Hallacas
- Humitas
- List of maize dishes
- List of pork dishes
- List of stuffed dishes
- Pamonha
- Pasteles
- Pepes
- Otak-otak
- Suman (food)
- Kenkey
- Tamale Guy
- Zongzi
