= Blake's Lotaburger =

Fast food restaurant chain based in Albuquerque, New Mexico

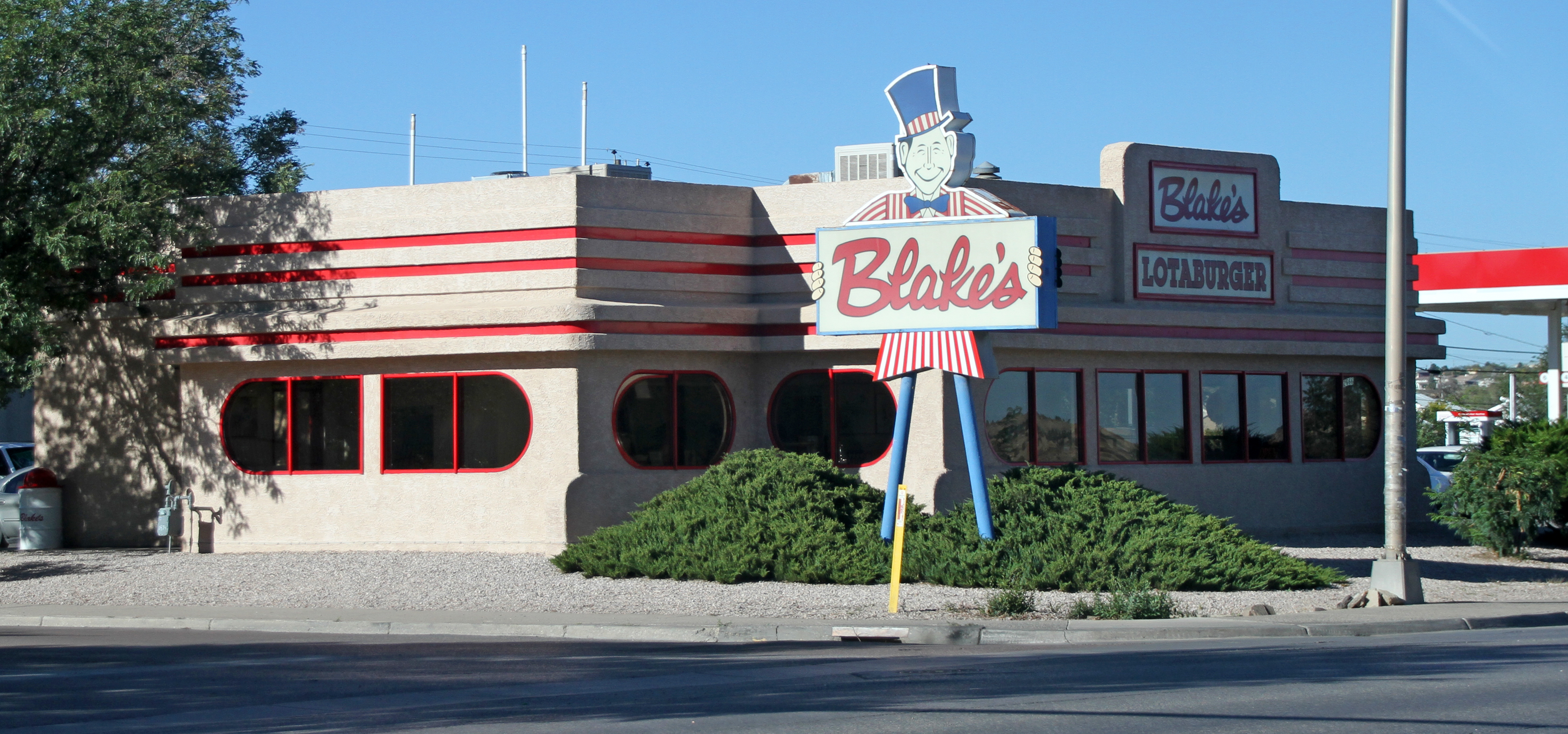
- Lotaburger location in Gallup, New Mexico, featuring a "Blake's Man" sign
- Company type: Private
- Industry: Fast food restaurant
- Founded: 1952; 74 years ago Albuquerque, New Mexico
- Founder: Blake Chanslor
- Headquarters: Albuquerque, New Mexico, United States
- Number of locations: 75
- Area served: New Mexico, Texas, and Arizona
- Key people: Ronald C. Rule (CEO)
- Products: Green chile burgers, chicken sandwiches, french fries, red and/or green New Mexico chile, Blake's sauce, breakfast burritos, chili, hot dogs, milkshakes, and soft drinks
- Owner: Ronald C. Rule
- Number of employees: 1,600 as of December 20, 2021
- Website: www.lotaburger.com

Blake's Lotaburger (often shortened to either Blake's or Lotaburger) is a fast food restaurant chain, based in Albuquerque, New Mexico, with 75 locations in the Southwestern United States, mostly located in New Mexico, as well as Arizona and Texas. Their menu focuses on New Mexico green chile topped hamburgers and french fries, as well as New Mexican foods such as breakfast burritos.

All Lotaburger restaurants are company-owned. Blake's Lotaburger also owns the majority of the property that its stores are built on and the company's construction division oversees the development of all new stores. Blake's owns and operates its own sheet metal shop, refrigeration shop, cabinet shop, vehicle shop, maintenance fleet, and commissary.

The traditional signage out front is the "Blake's Man", a 10-to-15-foot-tall (3.0 to 4.6 m) man with blue poles for legs, a blue hat and bowtie, and a jacket with white and red stripes. It holds a sign bearing the Blake's name.

== History ==
Blake's Lotaburger was founded by World War II Navy veteran Blake Chanslor, who moved from Texas to Albuquerque, New Mexico, after World War II. Chanslor opened his first "Lota Burger" stand on July 9, 1952. His initial investment in the business was $5,300, and his stand was 230 square feet (21 m^{2}), on the corner of San Mateo and Southern, in southeast Albuquerque. In 1953, he opened two more stores.

Chanslor expanded Lotaburger to 23 cities in New Mexico, with 7 stores in the Four Corners Area and 35 stores in Albuquerque. Chanslor remained the owner until 2003, when he sold his interest to Ronald C. Rule. Rule has kept Blake’s Lotaburger a family- owned business. As of 2018, the company owns and operates 75 stores.

In the 1990s, the company featured television commercial personality Ernest P. Worrell, played by Jim Varney, in many of its television ads.

According to the Albuquerque Journal in 1994, Lotaburger helped popularize the use of green chile, statewide staples of New Mexican food, as a condiment on hamburgers. In 2006, the company was recognized by National Geographic for the “Best Green Chile Cheeseburger in the World". In 2009, the New Mexico Tourism Department listed the restaurants as one of the state's destinations on the Green Chile Cheeseburger Trail.

In June 2013, the company announced that its first Texas location would open that fall on El Paso's west side. A second El Paso location opened in June 2014 on the city's east side. As of 2024, there are currently 2 locations in El Paso.

The company announced plans in early 2015 to expand to Tucson, Arizona. Two locations opened in April and June 2017, followed by a third location in January 2018.

In 2017, Blake's Lotaburger became the first New Mexico True Certified Business in the state of New Mexico.

== Fare ==
Blake's signature menu items are the LOTA and ITSA Burgers, served with french fries, but the burgers and fries can be topped with cheese and Hatch green chile; they serve other New Mexican cuisine food items as well, such as breakfast burritos and biscochito flavored milkshakes. The ITSA Burger is smaller in size to the namesake LOTA Burger, but is otherwise identical. In 2006 it was named the best burger in the world by National Geographic.

Blake's also serves a variety of other foods, including: Nathan's Famous hot dogs, chili con carne, and chicken sandwiches.

There are also rotating seasonal menu items, such as the Fish Basket and Fish Sandwich. Both are offered in the late winter-early spring during the Lenten season (Ash Wednesday through Easter Sunday). Blake's is also known for its unique, limited-time, featured shakes and malts including Pumpkin Pie, Birthday Cake, Cherry White Chocolate, Green Chile Lime, and others.

== Community relations ==
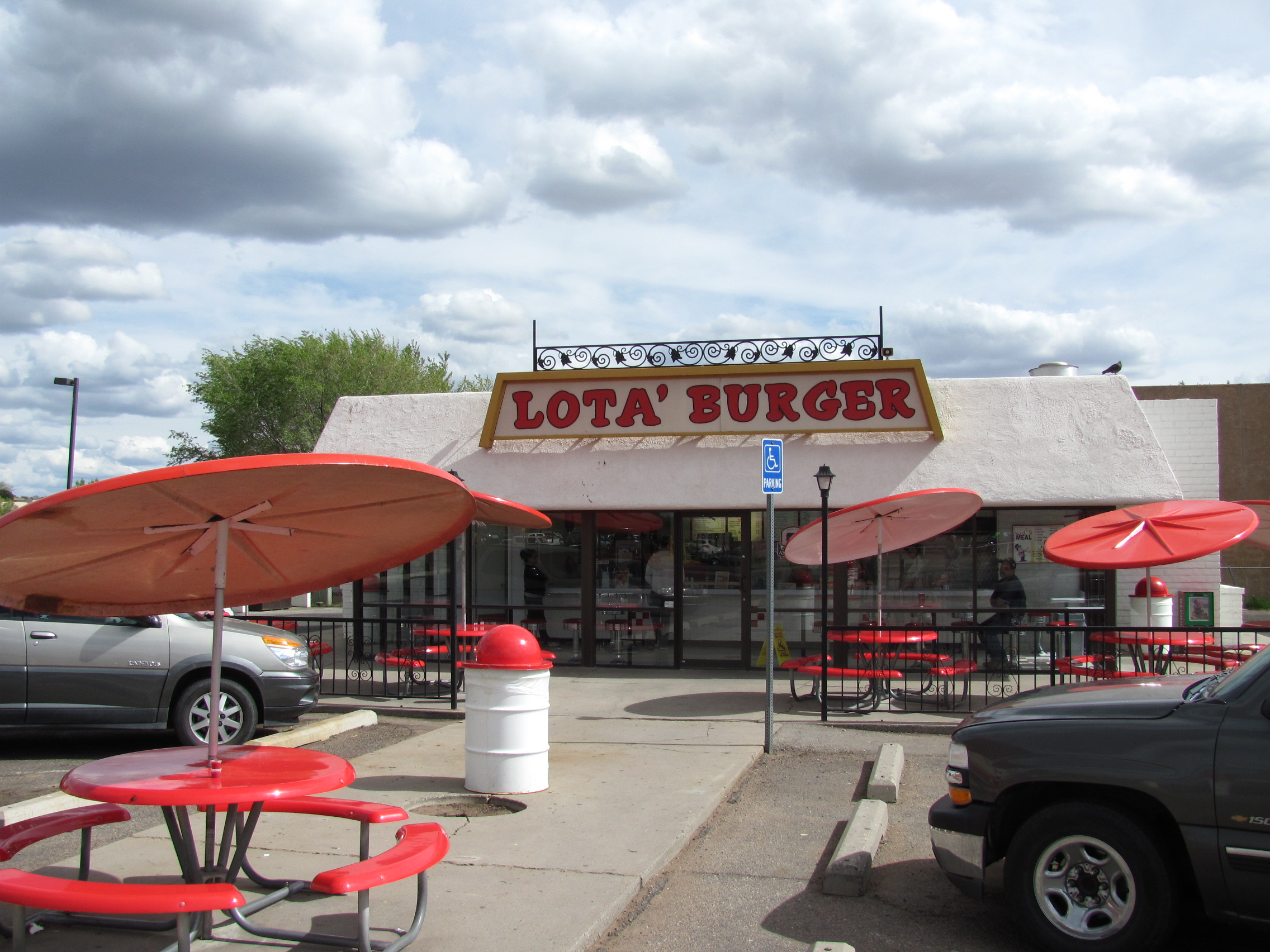
An older location in Santa Fe

Blake's Lotaburger is a long-time supporter of the Special Olympics in New Mexico. The 2018 season marks a 22-year history with the organization.

They also participate in KOAT Channel 7's “KOATS for Kids” program which has donated over 300,000 coats to children and families in need. During the late-fall, customers are encouraged to donate their new and used coats in stores throughout the state of New Mexico.

Blake's Lotaburger product placement was featured in multiple episodes of the Albuquerque-based crime drama Breaking Bad.

== See also ==
- List of hamburger restaurants
