= Frontier Restaurant =

Coordinates: 35.080°N 106.619°W

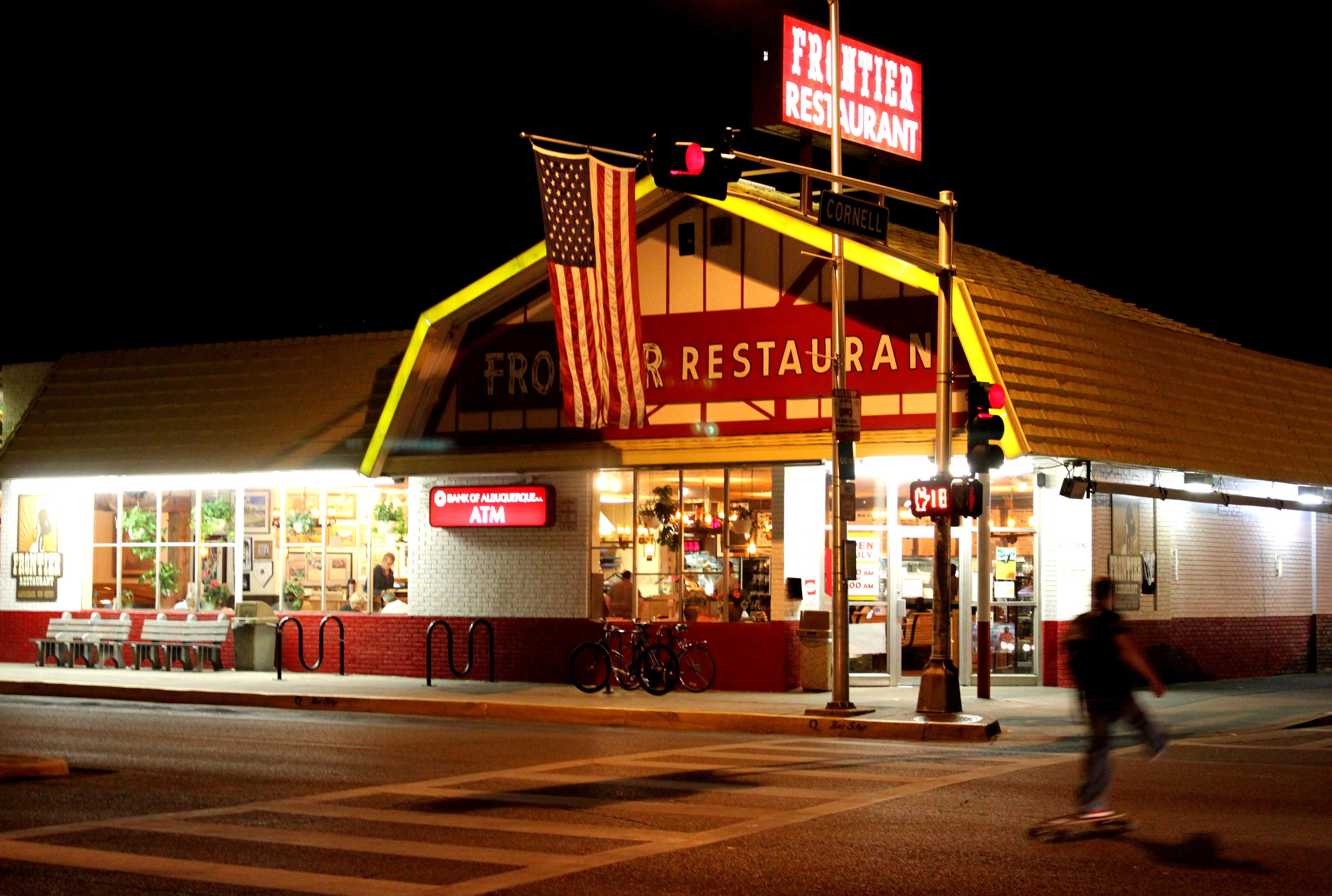
- Frontier Restaurant at night (September 2009)
- Interactive map of Frontier Restaurant

Restaurant information
- Established: 1971
- Dress code: Casual
- Location: 2400 Central Ave SE, Albuquerque, New Mexico, 87106, United States
- Seating capacity: 326
- Website: frontierrestaurant.com

Frontier Restaurant is a landmark New Mexican cuisine restaurant, located near the main campus of the University of New Mexico in Albuquerque, New Mexico. It is one of the city's most popular restaurants, serving about 4,000 customers per day in 2000, and is open daily from 5 a.m. to midnight. The restaurant has five dining rooms covering a total of 8,000 square feet (740 m^{2}) and is decorated with over 100 Western-themed artworks, including several portraits of John Wayne, referencing the nickname that both he and the city of Albuquerque share: “The Duke” and “The Duke City”.

== History ==
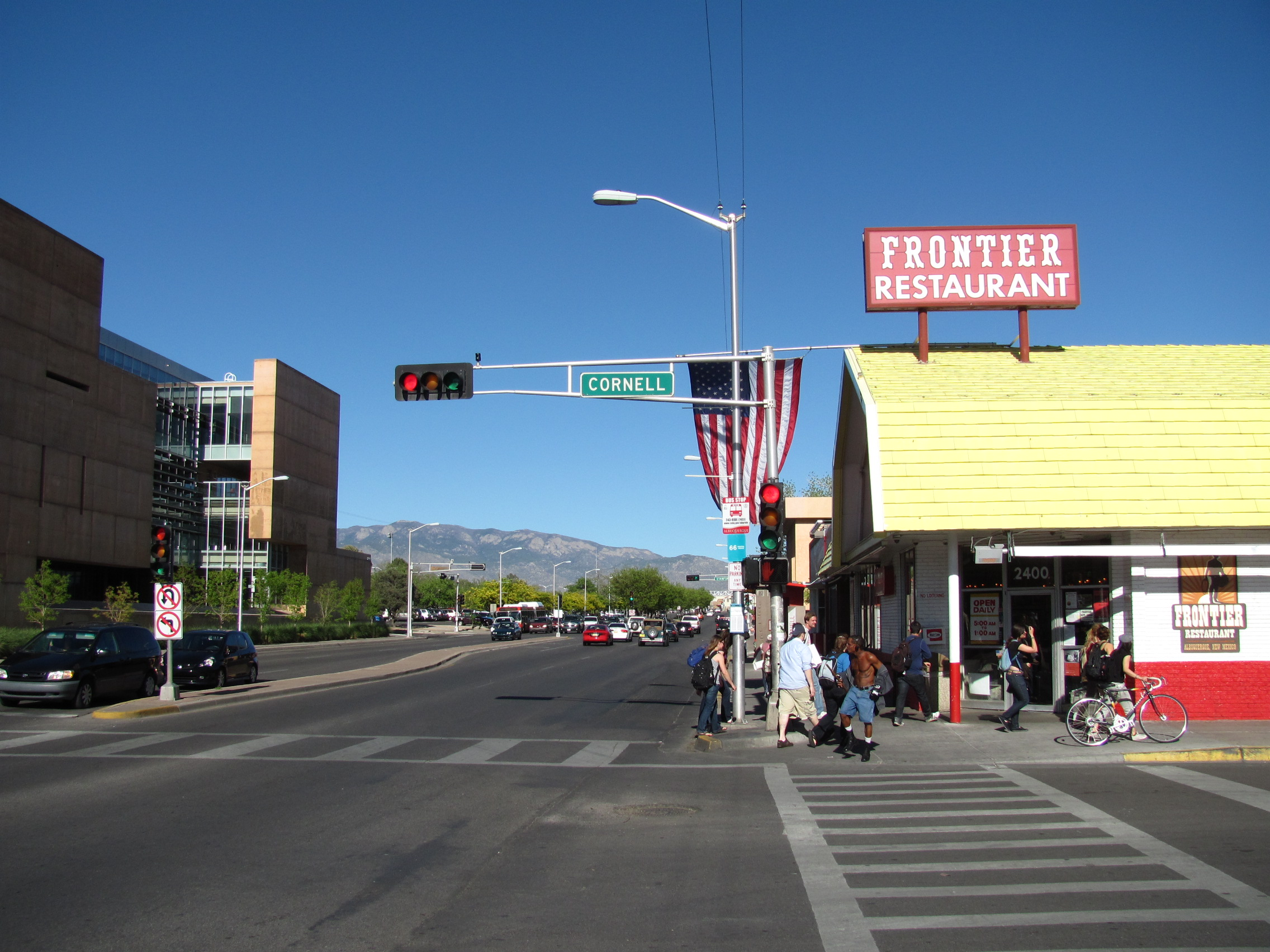
Central Avenue at the Frontier Restaurant, Albuquerque New Mexico, May 2010 - looking east, University of New Mexico on the left

Frontier Restaurant was established in 1971 by Dorothy and Larry Rainosek, who had recently moved to Albuquerque from Austin, Texas. Hoping to attract college students, they leased a barn-shaped building on Central Avenue across from the University of New Mexico, which had previously housed a short-lived restaurant called the Country Barn. Earlier, the corner had also been the site of a famous soda fountain called Chisholm's. The Frontier opened on February 10 with just 15 menu items and five employees.

Initially, the restaurant served breakfast, hamburgers, sandwiches, and some Tex-Mex foods like enchiladas. After customer requests, they began to incorporate New Mexican cuisine into the menu by the end of 1971. By 1989, the Frontier had expanded into the adjoining buildings on the block for a total of five dining rooms and 8,000 square feet (740 m^{2}) of space. The restaurant was open 24 hours a day in the early 1990s but was forced to cut back its hours in 2006 after repeated problems with unruly patrons.

== Menu ==
The Frontier serves primarily New Mexican cuisine along with American diner fare, like sandwiches, hamburgers, and breakfast plates. Some of the best-known menu items include sweet rolls, green chile cheeseburgers, green chile stew, carne adovada, and breakfast burritos. The restaurant also sells some bulk items including tortillas, chile, carne adovada, posole, green chile stew, and sweet rolls.
