= New Mexican cuisine =

Cuisine originating from what is now the US state of New Mexico

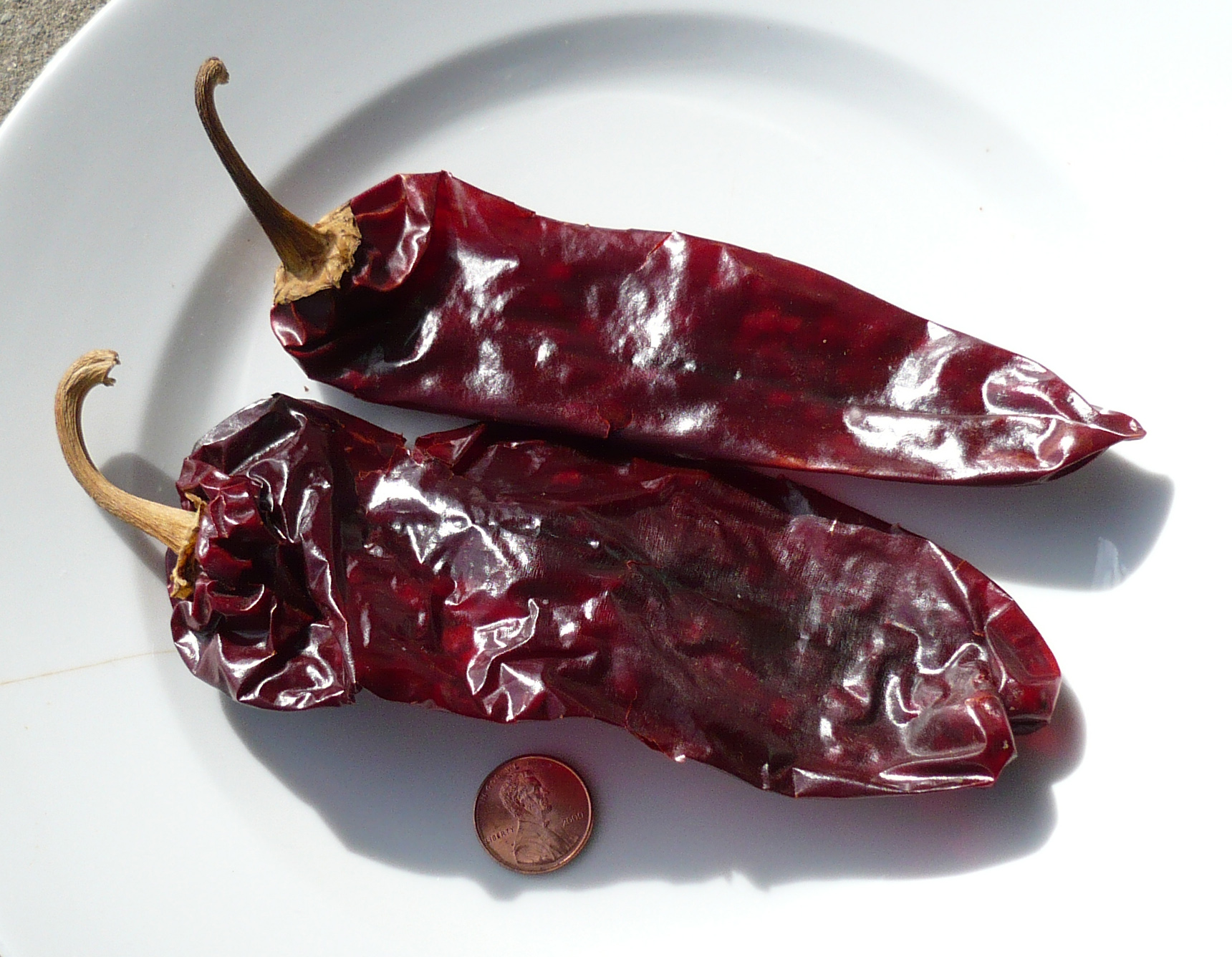
Dried red New Mexico chile peppers

New Mexican cuisine is the regional cuisine of the Southwestern US state of New Mexico. It is known for its fusion of Pueblo Native American cuisine with Hispano Spanish and Mexican culinary traditions, rooted in the historical region of Nuevo México. This Southwestern culinary style extends its influence beyond the current boundaries of New Mexico, and is found throughout the old territories of Nuevo México and the New Mexico Territory, today the state of Arizona, parts of Texas (particularly El Paso County and the Panhandle), and the southern portions of Colorado, Utah, and Nevada. New Mexican cuisine not only spans a broad Southwestern geographic area, but it is also a globally recognized ethnic cuisine, particularly for the Oasisamericans, Hispanos, and those connected to caballero cowboy culture or anyone originally from New Mexico.

The evolution of New Mexican cuisine reflects diverse influences over time. It was shaped early on by the Pueblo people, along with nearby Apache and Navajo culinary practices and the broader culinary traditions of New Spain and the Spanish Empire. Additional influences came from French, Italian, Portuguese, and other Mediterranean cuisines, which introduced new ingredients and techniques. Early European settlers also contributed with their bed and breakfasts and cafés, adding to the culinary landscape. During the American territorial phase, cowboy chuckwagons and Western saloons left their mark, followed by American diner culture along Route 66, Mexican-American cuisine, fast food, and global culinary trends after statehood in 1912.

Despite these diverse influences, New Mexican cuisine developed largely in isolation, preserving its indigenous, Spanish, Mexican, and Latin roots. This has resulted in a cuisine that is distinct from other Latin American cuisines found in the contiguous United States. It stands out for its emphasis on local spices, herbs, flavors, and vegetables, particularly the iconic red and green New Mexico chile peppers, anise (used in biscochitos), and piñon (used as a snack or in desserts).

Signature dishes and foods from New Mexico include Native American frybread-style sopapillas, breakfast burritos, enchilada montada (stacked enchiladas), green chile stew, carne seca (a thinly sliced variant of jerky), green chile burgers, posole (a hominy dish), slow-cooked frijoles (typically pinto or bolita beans), calabacitas (a sautéed zucchini and summer squash dish), and carne adovada (pork marinated in red chile).

== History ==
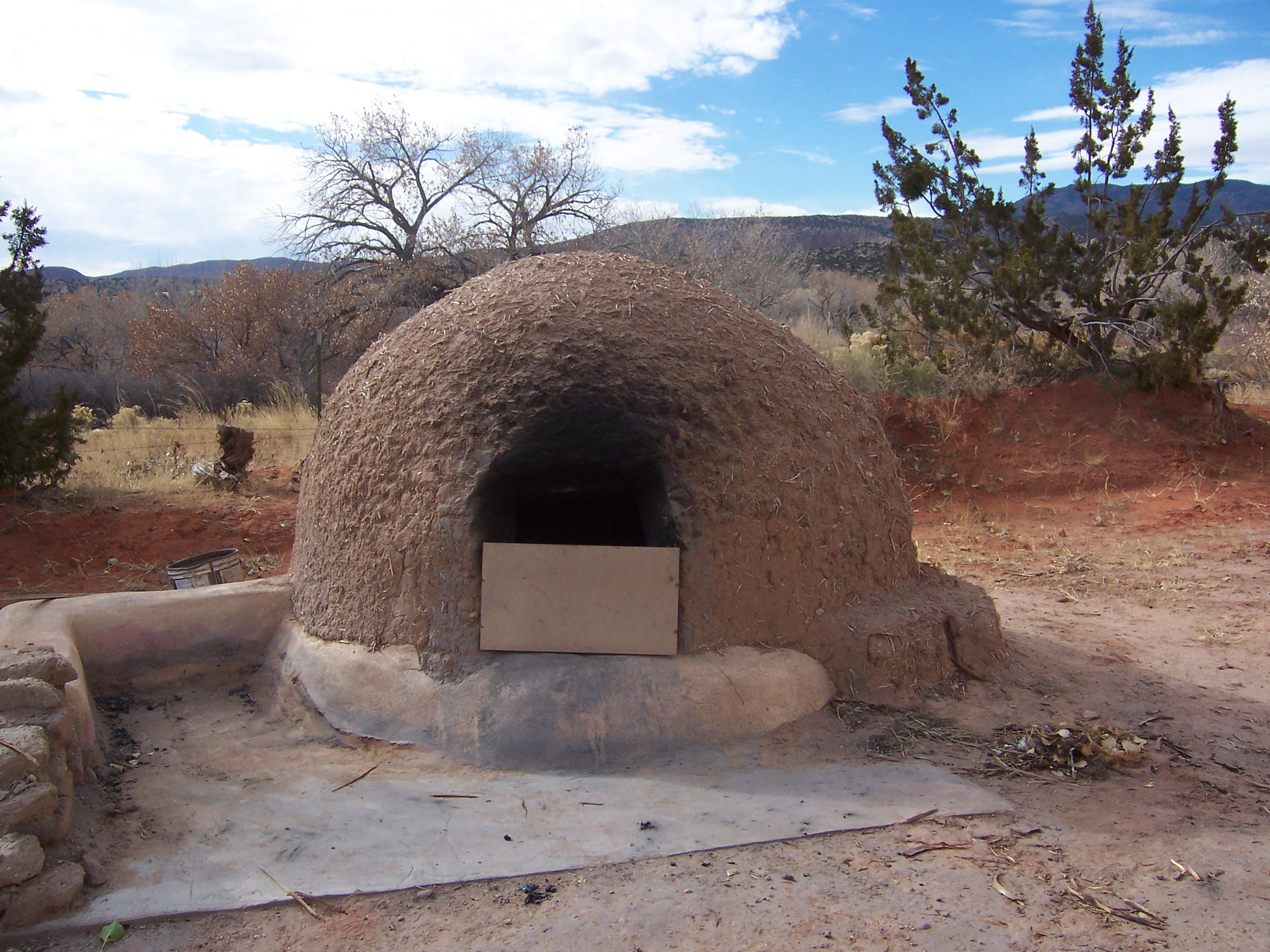
Traditional horno outdoor oven

Prior to the establishment of New Mexico's current boundaries, Santa Fe de Nuevo México's land claim encompassed the Pueblo peoples and also oversaw the land of the Chiricahua, Comanche, Mescalero, and Navajo.

The Spaniards brought their cuisine, which mingled with the indigenous. They introduced wheat, rice, beef, mutton/lamb, among other foods and flavors, to the native corn, chile, beans, squash, and other indigenous ingredients.

During this early development period, before the horno, an outdoor beehive-shaped earth oven, became ubiquitous in Pueblo and Hispano communities. This distinct history, combined with the local terrain and climate, has resulted in significant differences between the cuisine of New Mexico and somewhat similar styles in Northern Mexico, and other Southwestern US states such as California, Arizona, and Texas.

New Mexico's population includes Native Americans who have worked the land for thousands of years, including the farms of the Ancestral Pueblo peoples as well as the modern extant Pueblo, Navajo and Apache. The Hispano explorers included farmers and ranchers as they arrived during the Spanish era in the 16th century, well into the Mexican era which ended in the 19th century.

Americans traded and settled after the Civil War, today groups from Asia and other communities have come to New Mexico.

When New Mexicans refer to chile they are talking about pungent pods, or sauce made from those pods, not the concoction of spices, meat or beans known as Texas chili con carne. While the chile pod is sometimes spelled chili outside of New Mexico, US Senator Pete Domenici of New Mexico made this state's spelling official as chile, by entering it into the Congressional Record.

One of the first authors to publish a cookbook describing traditional New Mexican cuisine was educator and writer Fabiola Cabeza de Baca Gilbert, who published Historic Cookery in 1931. Her work helped introduce cooking with chiles to the United States more broadly.

== Ingredients ==
=== Chile ===
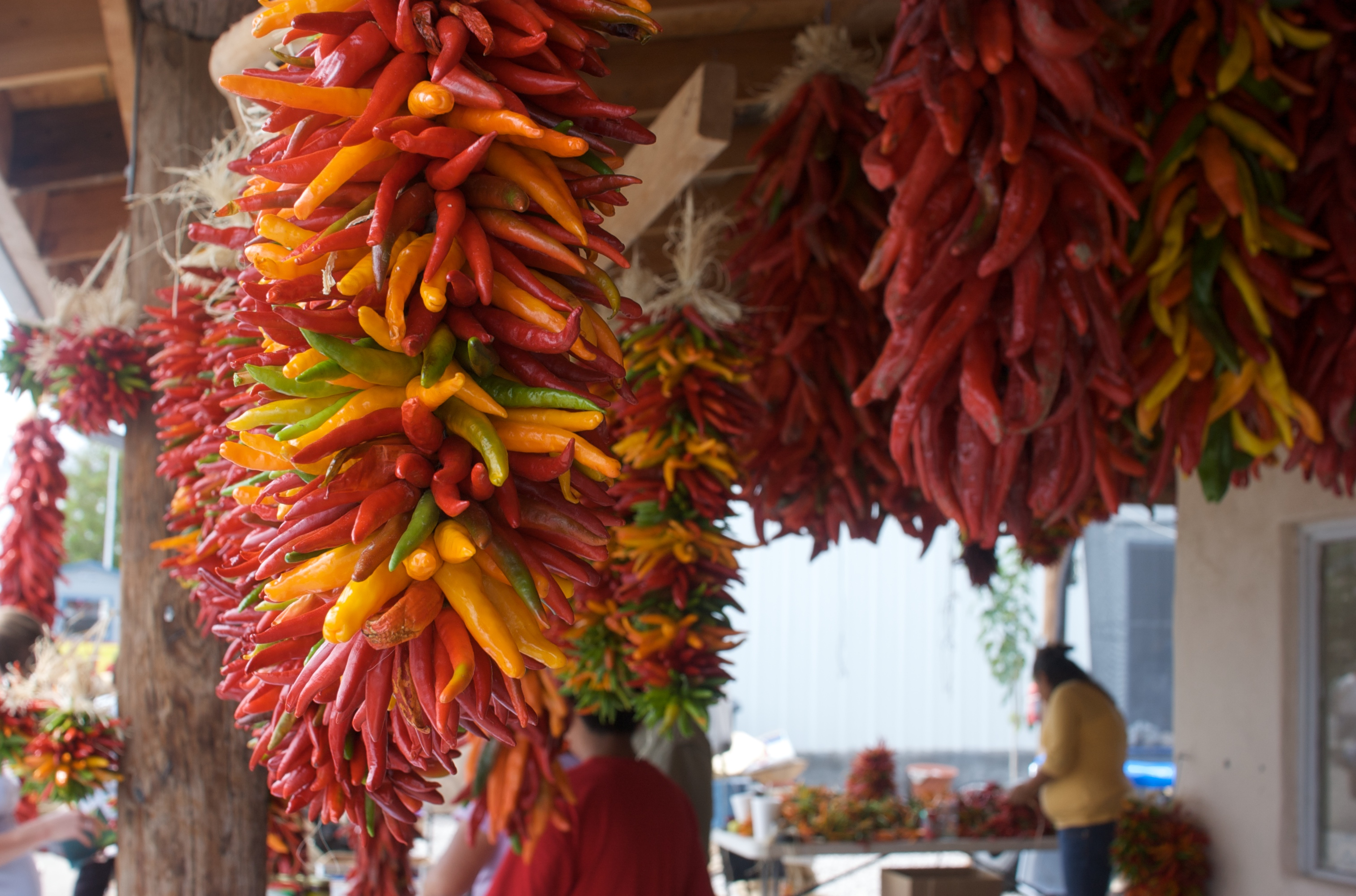
Chile ristras ripening from green to red

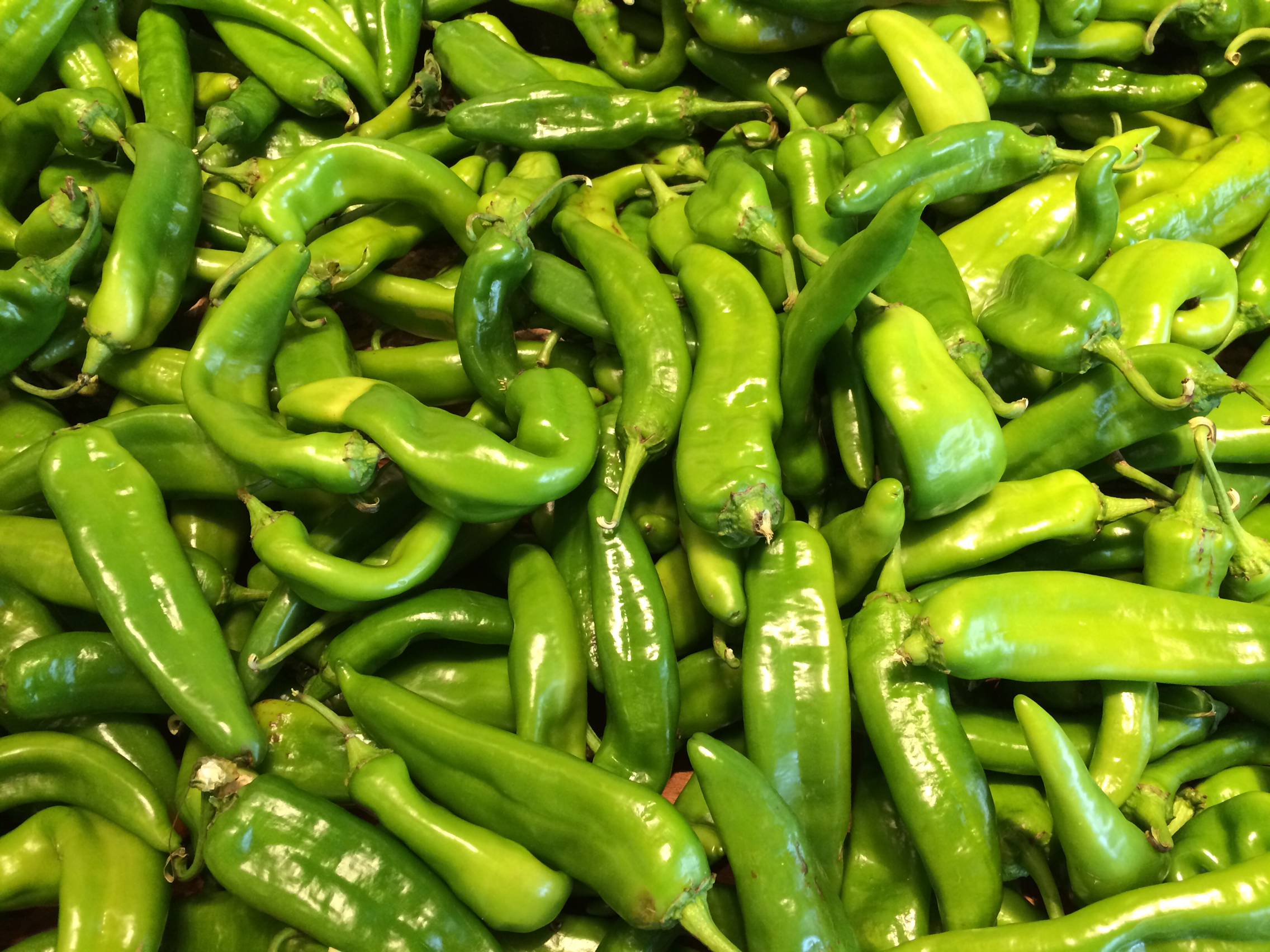
New Mexico green chiles

New Mexico chile is the defining ingredient of New Mexican food. Chile is New Mexico's largest agricultural crop. Within New Mexico, green chile is also popular in non-New Mexican cuisines including Mexican-style food and American food like cheeseburgers, french fries, bagels, and pizza.

The New Mexico official State Question is "Red or green?" This refers to the choice of red or green chile with an entrée. "Christmas," a relatively new tradition originating in the 1980s, is a request for both (one side covered with green, the other with red). New Mexico red and green chile have a rich and distinctive flavor that causes traditional preparations to require few additional flavoring ingredients. The essence of New Mexico chile preparation is its simplicity.

The New Mexico green chile is a variety of the chile pepper, Capsicum annuum, and was developed as a recognizable strain in New Mexico by the late nineteenth century. It is available today in several distinct and selectively-cultivated strains called cultivars.

The chile pepper is grown in the state's very high altitude (4,000–8,000 ft) and dry, hot climate. Much like grapes for wine, these growing conditions contribute, along with genetics, to giving New Mexico green chile its distinctive deep green color, texture, and flavor.

The climate of New Mexico tends to increase the capsaicin levels in the chile pod compared to pods grown in other regions. This results in the possibility of hotter varieties. New Mexico green chiles can range from mild to extremely hot.

At harvest time (August through the middle of October) green chile is typically roasted, peeled and frozen for the year ahead. Chile is such a staple in New Mexico that many national restaurant chains offer New Mexico chile at their New Mexico locations.

New Mexico red chile is simply the fully ripened green chile pepper. As it ripens, it first turns orange and then quickly turns red. As it does so, the skin thickens and fuses to the inner fruit or "meat" of the pepper. This means that, for the red pepper to be enjoyable, it must first be dried and then blended into a puree. The puree can be made using full red chile pods or red chile powder (which is made by finely grinding the dried pod).

The purée is not edible until cooked as red chile sauce. This is made by cooking the puree with garlic, salt – and occasionally oregano – and has the consistency of tomato soup. Discerning native New Mexicans prefer sun-dried over oven-dried red chile, as the oven-drying process gives it a non-traditional smoky flavor and a dark maroon color.

Red chile peppers are traditionally sun-dried in bundles called ristras, which are a common decorative sight on porches and in homes and businesses throughout the Southwest. The process of creating the ristra is highly labor-intensive, so in recent decades it has become a predominantly decorative item.

The bulk of New Mexico chile is grown in the Hatch Valley in the south of the state, in and around the village of Hatch. It is also grown along the entire Rio Grande Valley, and Chimayo in the north is also well known for its chile.

=== Piñon ===
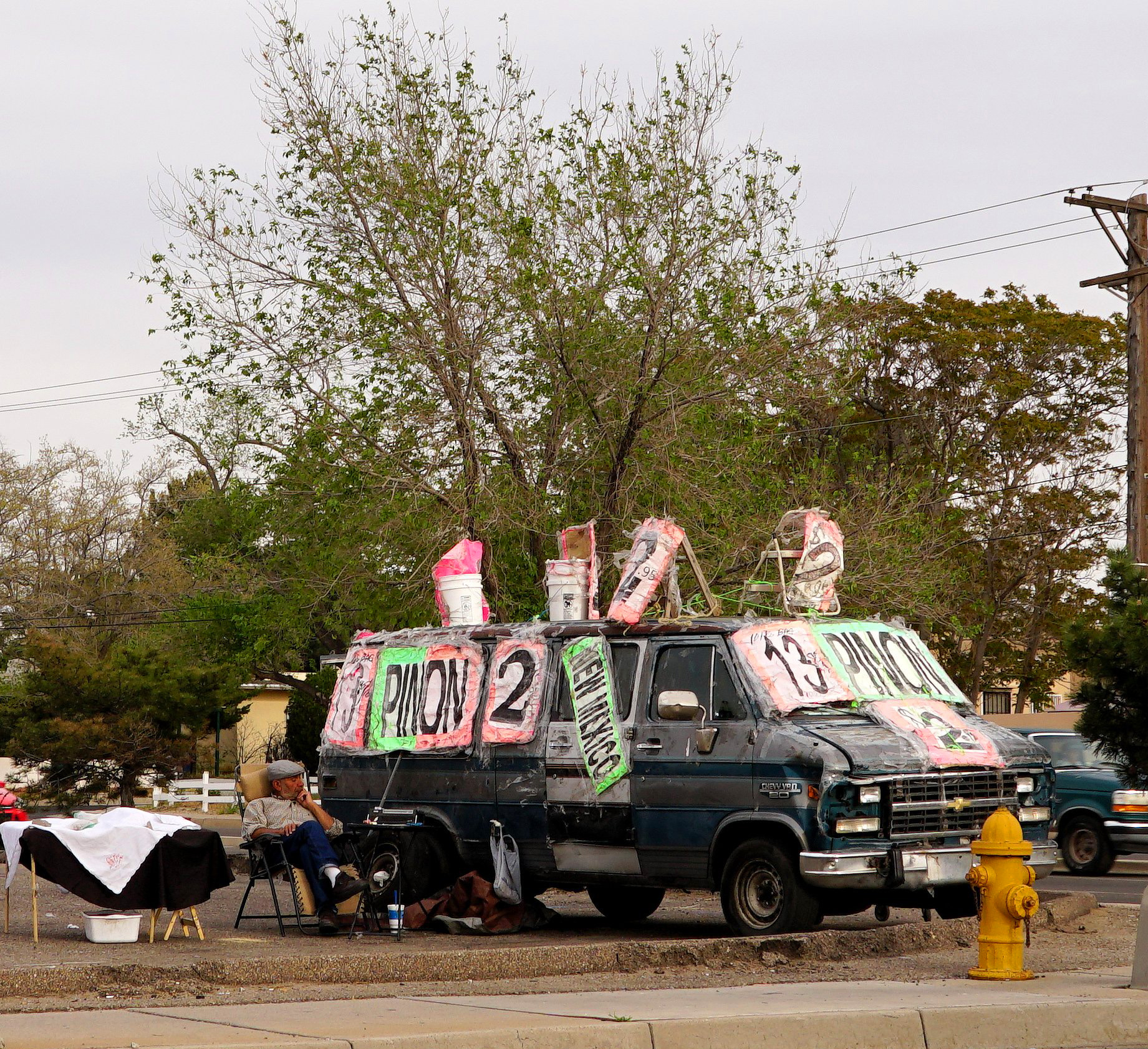
Typical New Mexico street scene with a truck (in this case a van) selling piñon nuts

Piñones, or piñon nuts, are a traditional food of Native Americans and Hispanos in New Mexico that is harvested from the ubiquitous piñon pine shrub. The state of New Mexico protects the use of the word piñon for use with pine nuts from certain species of indigenous New Mexican pines. The harvest doesn't generally arrive in full force until after New Mexico's first freeze of the winter.

=== Other ingredients ===
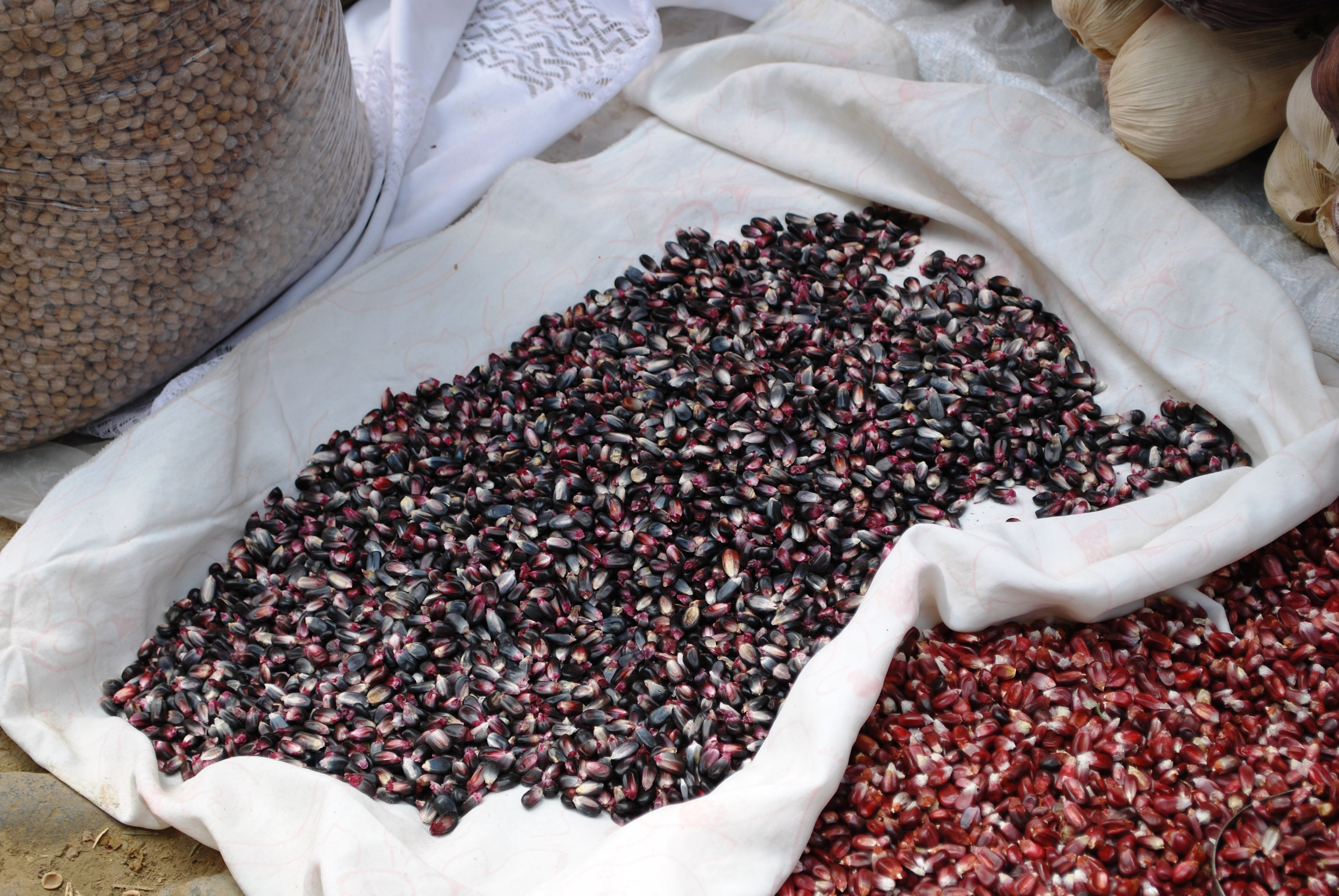
Raw blue corn

Wheat flour tortillas are more prevalent in New Mexico cuisine as a table bread than corn tortillas. However, corn tortillas, corn tortilla chips, and masa are the foundations of many traditional New Mexico dishes, and are sometimes made of blue corn. Common traditional dishes include enchiladas, tacos, posole, tamales, and sopaipillas and honey served with the meal.

Corn (maize) remains a staple grain, the yellow sweet corn variety is most common in New Mexico, though white is sometimes used, and blue and red flint corn varieties are used for specialties like atole and blue-corn tortilla chips. Kernel corn and corn on the cob are frequent side dishes, as in the American South.

Corn is not a frequent component of New Mexico salsa or pico de gallo, and is usually a separate side dish in and of itself.

Anise is common in some desserts, especially the state cookie, the biscochito.

Cilantro, a pungent green herb (also called Mexican or Chinese parsley, the seeds of which are known as coriander) used fresh in salsas, and as a topping for virtually any dish; not common in traditional New Mexican cuisine, but one of the defining tastes of Santa Fe style.

Cumin, the quintessential "Mexican food" spice, is used very differently in New Mexican food, usually reserved for spicing ground beef and sometimes other meats for burritos, tacos, and nachos. It is not used to flavor red and green chile sauces. Oregano is a sparingly used but common herb in traditional New Mexican dishes.

The early Spanish Colonies along the Rio Grande River in New Mexico used safflower as a substitute for saffron in traditional recipes. An heirloom variety originating from Corrales, New Mexico, called "Corrales Azafran" is still cultivated and used as a saffron substitute in New Mexican cuisine.

== Foods and dishes ==
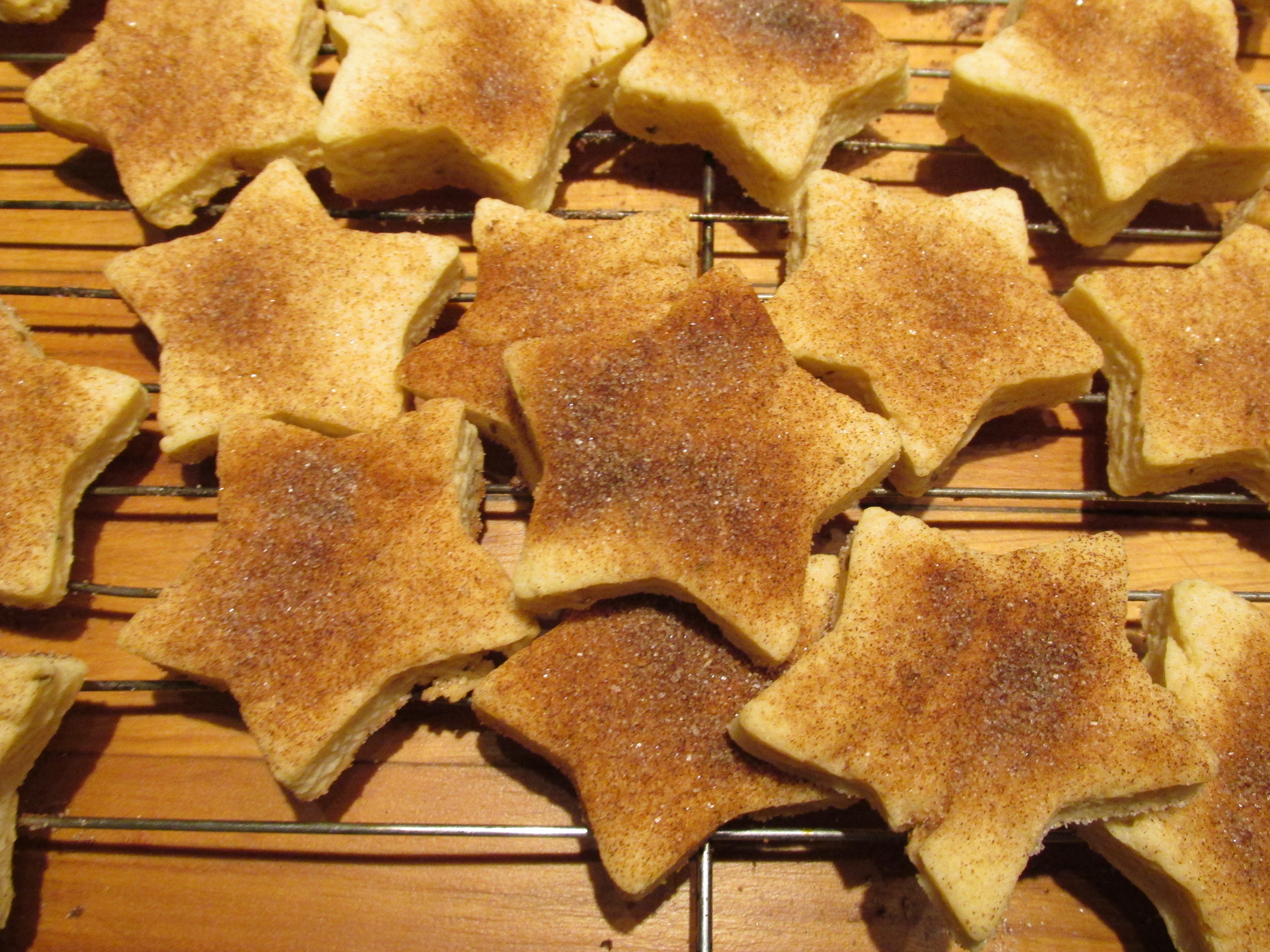
Biscochitos, the state cookie of New Mexico

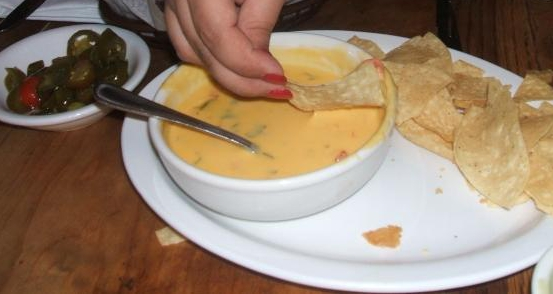
Chile con queso

- Albóndigas (meatball soup) – traditionally made with beef broth, ground pork or beef, vegetables and rice. Also known as sopa de albóndigas. Albóndigas is the term for the dish as well as the meatball itself.
- Arroz dulce – sweet rice pudding, a traditional Northern New Mexican dessert, primarily popular in traditional homes, and rarely found in restaurants. Rice is generally cooked in milk and water. Then, simmered with sugar and raisins, garnished with cinnamon, and served hot.
- Atole – a thick, hot gruel made from blue corn meal in New Mexico.
- Biscochito – anise-flavored cookie sprinkled with cinnamon sugar, traditionally made with lard. It was developed by residents of New Mexico over the centuries from the first Spanish colonists of what was then known as Santa Fe de Nuevo México. Although biscochitos may sometimes be found at any time of year, they are a traditional Christmas cookie.
- Burrito – the New Mexico burrito is a white-flour tortilla with fillings of meat, such as pork carnitas, chicken, ground or shredded beef, or carne adovada, refried pinto beans, or both meat and beans, along with red or green chile.
  - Breakfast burrito – a breakfast version of the above, typically including scrambled eggs, potatoes, red or green chile, cheese (usually Cheddar), and sometimes bacon or sausage; originated in Santa Fe, New Mexico.

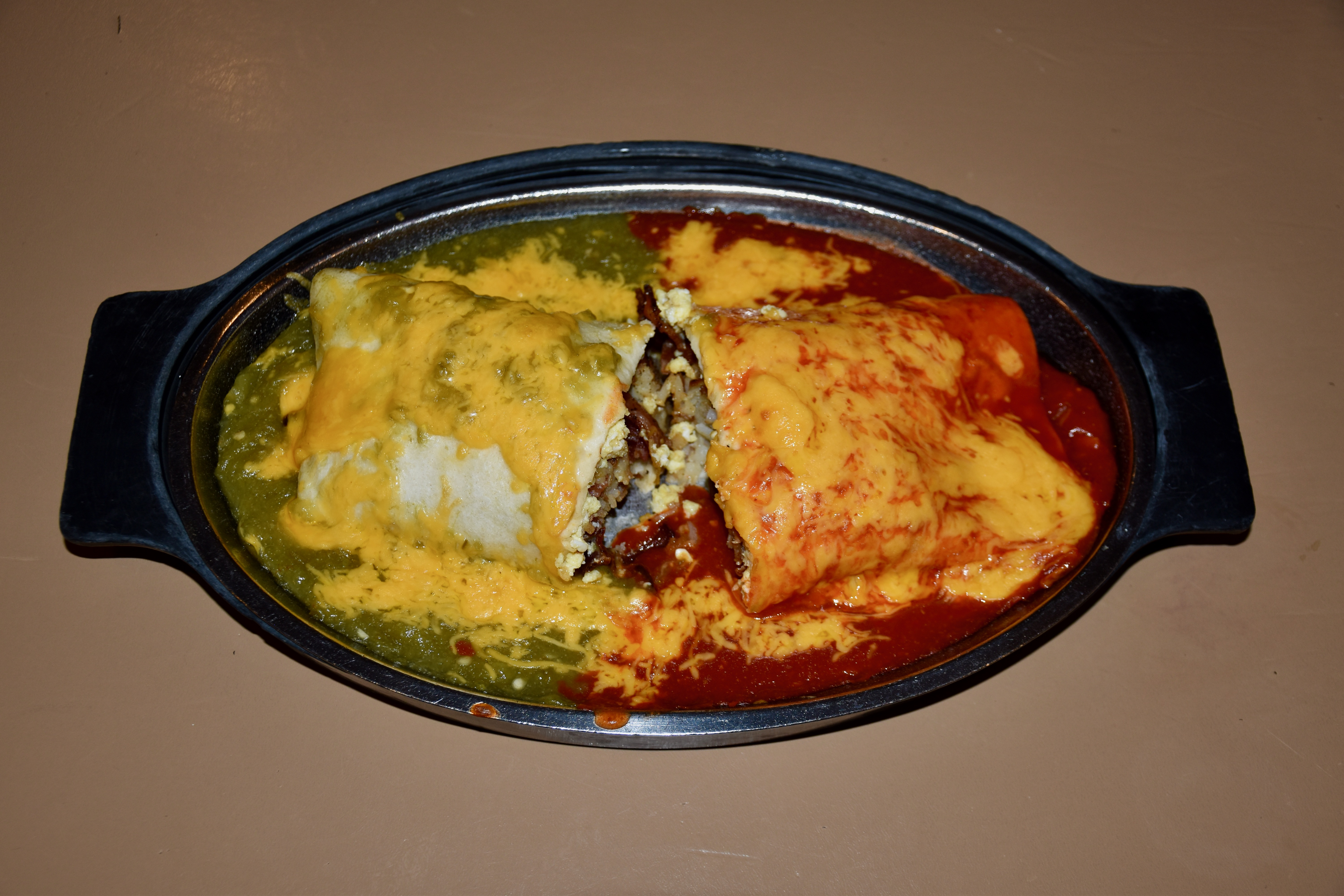
A smothered, Christmas-style breakfast burrito from Tia Sophia's diner in Santa Fe, New Mexico

- Cactus fries: Prickly pear cactus nopales cut into strips and french-fried or deep fried, and served with dipping sauce.

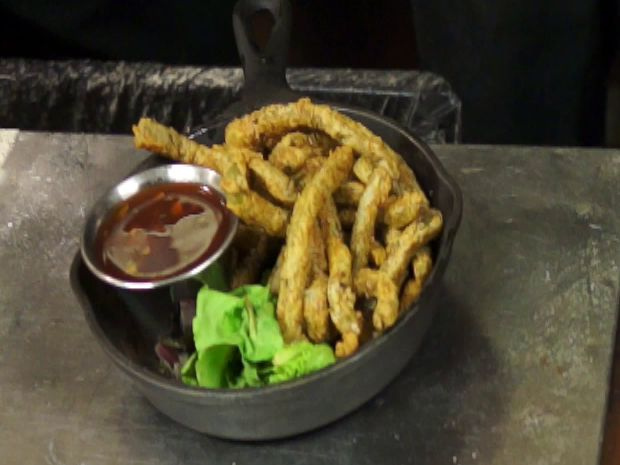
Cactus fries with a side of prickly pear sauce

- Calabacitas: Chopped summer squash (calabas) with onions, garlic, yellow corn, green chile, sauteed in oil.
- Caldillo – a thin, green or red chile stew or soup of meat (usually beef, often pork or a mixture), potatoes, and chiles. Sometimes called caldito, especially as a side dish. Both terms are diminutive forms of the Spanish word, caldo, for soup.
- Capirotada – a bread-pudding dessert, traditionally made during Lent festivities. Capirotada is made of toasted bread crumbs or fried slices of birote or bolillo bread, then soaked in a syrup made of melted sugar, or piloncillo, and cinnamon. It usually contains raisins, and possibly other fruits and nut bits. Finely grated cheese may be added when it's still hot from the oven, so that it melts. Served warm or cold.
- Carne adovada – cubes of pork that have been marinated and slow cooked in red chile sauce, garlic and oregano.
- Carne asada – roasted or broiled meat (often flank steak), marinated.
- Carne seca – literally translated to "dried meat", in New Mexican cuisine refers to a unique style of thinly sliced jerky which has a cracker or potato chip-like texture.
- Carnitas – grilled or broiled cubes of pork, traditionally smothered with red or green chile sauce and served as and entree.
- Chalupa – originating in California-style Mexican cuisine, a corn tortilla fried into a bowl shape and filled with shredded chicken or other meat or beans, and usually topped with guacamole and salsa. (another vegetable-laden version called taco salads; compare with tostadas.)
- Chicharrones – deep-fried pieces of pork trimmings usually including a layer of meat.
- Chile con queso – chile and melted cheese mixed into a dip.
- Chiles rellenos – whole green chiles stuffed with cheese, dipped in egg batter, and fried. This dish varies from other Mexican-style cuisines in that it uses the New Mexican chile, rather than a poblano pepper.
- Chile sauce – sauce made from red or green chiles usually served hot. Green chile is made with chopped, roasted fresh or frozen green chiles, while red chile is made from dried, roasted and pulverized ripe (red) chiles.
  Chile is one of the most definitive differences between New Mexican and other Mexican and Mexican-American cuisines (which often make a different green chile sauce from tomatillos).
  New Mexican cuisine uses chile sauce as taco sauce, enchilada sauce, burrito sauce, etc. (though any given meal may use both red and green varieties for different dishes). A thicker version of green chile with onions and other additions is called green chile stew and is popular in Albuquerque-style New Mexican food.
  The green chile sauce can sometimes be hotter than its red counterpart, though this depends entirely on the chile varieties used.
- Chimichanga – a small, deep-fried meat and (usually) bean wheat-tortilla burrito, also containing (or smothered with) chile sauce and cheese; popularized by the Allsup's convenience store chain with a series of humorous commercials in the 1980s with candid footage of people attempting and failing to pronounce the name correctly.
  Chimichangas, like flautas and taquitos, are a fast-food adaptation of traditional dishes in a form that can be stored frozen and then quickly fried as needed; they are also rigid and easily hand-held, and thus easy to eat by people while walking or driving.
- Chorizo – a spicy pork sausage, seasoned with garlic and red chile, usually used in ground or finely chopped form as a breakfast side dish or quite often as an alternative to ground beef or shredded chicken in other dishes.
- Empanadita (small empanada) – a pasty or turnover filled with sweet pumpkin, fruit, or minced meat, spices and nuts.

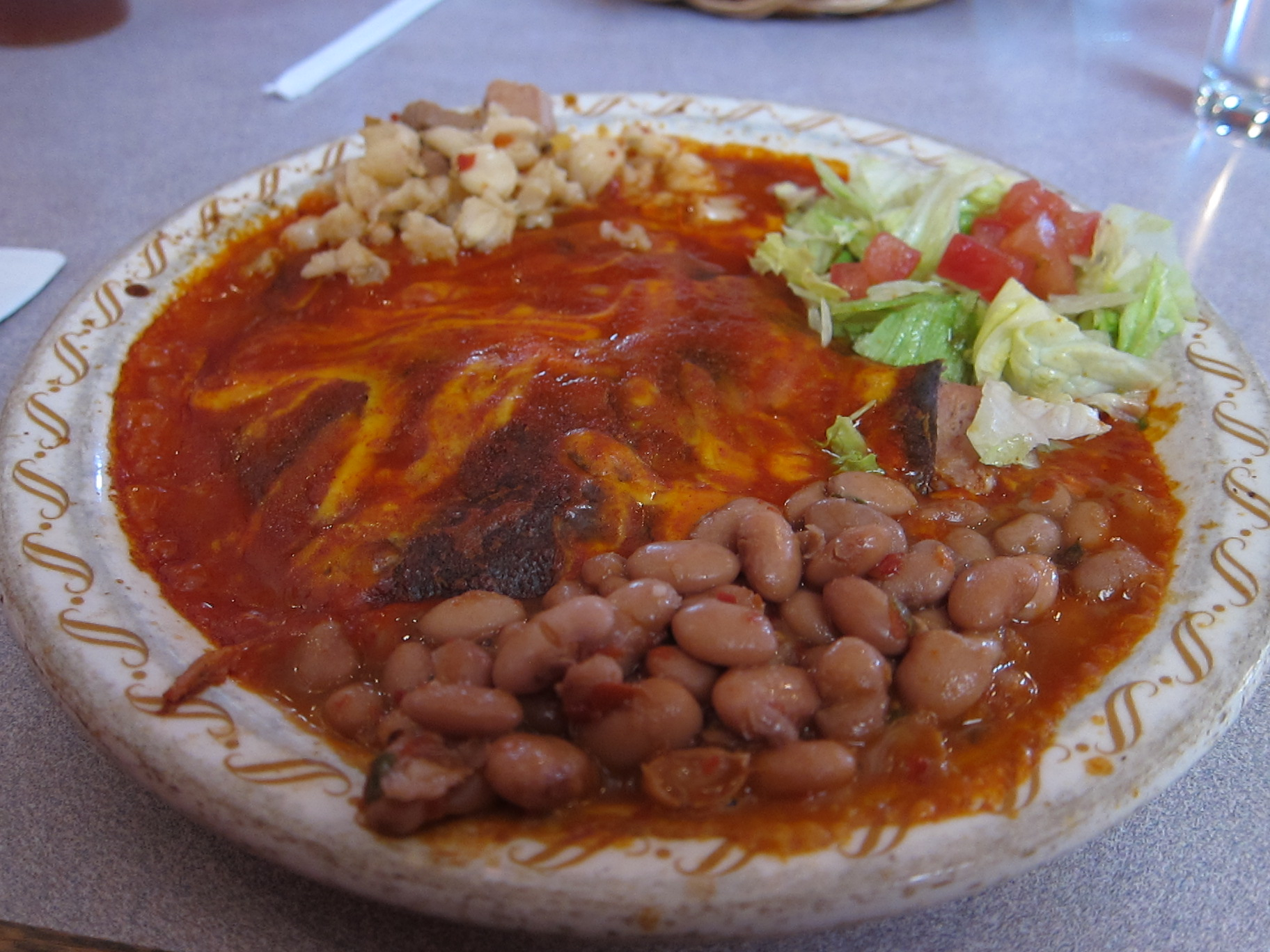
Stacked-style blue-corn chicken enchiladas smothered in red chile sauce with posole and pinto beans

- Enchiladas – corn tortillas filled with chicken, meat or cheese. They are either rolled, or stacked, and covered with chile sauce and cheese.
- Enchiladas montandas, or stacked enchilada – usually covered with either red or green chile sauce, and optionally topped with a fried egg. These stacked enchiladas are also common with blue-corn tortillas.
- Fish – being landlocked, New Mexico has no native seafood tradition, but freshwater fish are not uncommon entrees, especially trout. Crayfish are found in New Mexico. In the southeast of the state, crayfish tails are also consumed, as in Texas and Louisiana. While the native population made use of freshwater shellfish since prehistoric times, they are not common in modern New Mexico cuisine, though it has adapted various seafood items (e.g., shrimp tacos are common in restaurants).
- Flan – a caramel custard.
- Flauta – a small, tightly rolled, fried corn tortilla filled with ground beef, chicken, pork or turkey and served topped with guacamole and sour cream. Compare chimichanga and taquito.
- Frijoles (whole pinto beans) – along with Spanish rice, frijoles are the standard side served with any entrée. Traditional New Mexico beans are cooked very simply with salt pork and garlic. Frijoles are often served whole in New Mexico, rather than as refried beans (Frijoles refritos).
- Frijoles refritos (refried beans) – whole cooked beans are fried in bacon fat and mashed until they turn into a thick paste. Also known as simply refritos and often served with a topping of cheese.

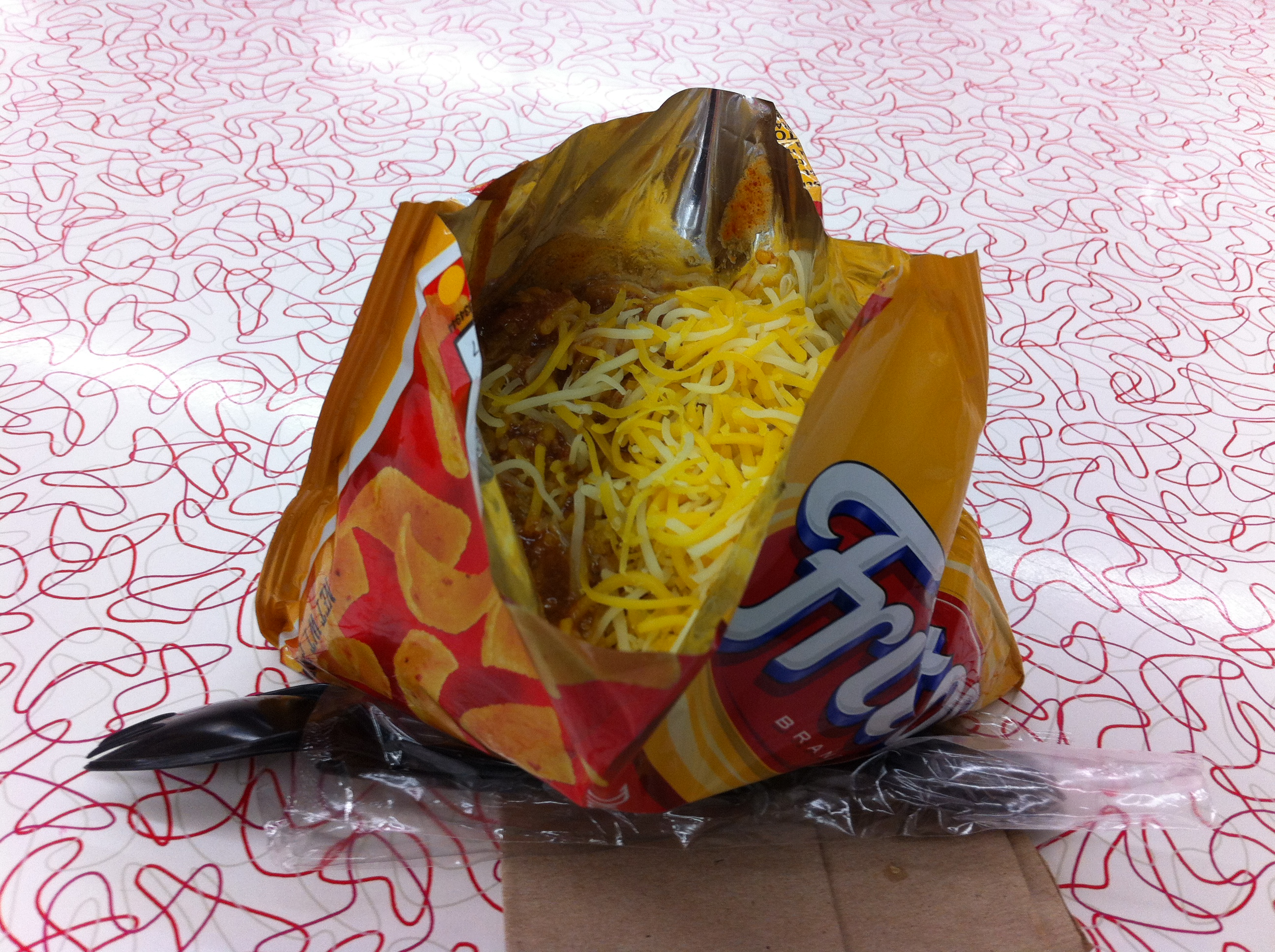
Frito pie at Five & Dime General Store on the Santa Fe Plaza

- Frito pie – a Tex-Mex casserole, made of red chile sauce, sometimes with meat and/or pinto beans, atop a bed of Fritos (or similar) corn chips, topped with cheese, usually topped also with shredded lettuce, chopped tomato, and onion.
  Although a Texas invention, it has become popular in New Mexico, and typically uses New Mexican red chile in the state.
- Green chile cheeseburger – widely considered the New-Mexican variety of cheeseburger, it is a regular hamburger topped with melted cheese and either whole or chopped green chile. The flavor is very distinctively New Mexican when compared to other types of hamburgers, and is even offered in the region by major fast food chains.
- Green chile cheese fries – a New Mexican variant to traditional cheese fries, fries served smothered with green chile sauce and topped with cheese.
- The fusion of regional ingredients also extends to a pizzerias in the Santa Fe's Railyard District, where makers adapt traditional New York-style thin crusts by utilizing wood-fired brick ovens to incorporate the rare local, New Mexico roasted red chile as well as the traditional roasted New Mexico green chile.
- Green chile stew – similar to caldillo with the use of green chile. Standard ingredients are coarsely-chopped green chile, ground or cubed beef, ground or cubed pork, potato, diced tomato, onion, garlic, and chicken or beef stock. The stew often contains coarsely-chopped carrots or other vegetables.
- Frybread – a traditional thick flatbread of deep-fried dough, developed by the Navajo people after the "Long Walk", when they were forcibly relocated to Bosque Redondo, New Mexico. Served as a snack with honey or for making Navajo tacos. The New Mexico sopaipilla is a variant of this.
- Guacamole – the traditional New Mexico version is avocados smashed or blended with a very small amount of the following: finely chopped onion, tomato, garlic, salt and lemon juice.
- Huevos rancheros – fried eggs any style on corn tortillas, smothered with red or green chile sauce, topped with shredded cheddar cheese, often served with potatoes or pinto beans. Flour tortillas on the side come standard.
- Jalapeño – a small, thick chile pepper, ranging from mild to painfully hot. In New Mexican food they are used chopped (fresh) in salsa and guacamole or as a topping (either pickled or fresh) for nachos.
- Natillas – soft custard-like dessert made from egg whites, milk, white sugar, vanilla, nutmeg, and cinnamon, cooked while whisking on a stove top and served either warm or cold.
- Nachos – Fried tortilla chips with yellow cheese and jalapeño peppers.
- Navajo taco – A taco made with frybread, rather than a tortilla.
- Panocha – a pudding made from sprouted wheat flour and piloncillo. The sprouted-wheat flour was historically called panocha flour, or simply panocha, but this has become a slang term for 'vagina'.
- Pastelitos ('little pies') – a thin pie baked on flat cookie sheet with dried fruit and spices, usually cut into small squares.
- Pico de gallo (rooster's beak) – a cold salsa with thick-chopped fresh chiles, tomatoes, onions and cilantro, without a tomato-paste base as in commercial packaged salsas, never contains vinegar.
- Posole – a thick stew made with hominy and pork. Chicken in lieu of pork is a popular variation. It is simmered for hours with pork or chicken and then combined with red or green chile and other ingredients such as onion, garlic, and oregano. Native New Mexicans include off-cuts of pork (especially pork rinds and pigs feet) in the pork version. They also prefer to use the un-popped hominy kernel, either blue or white, which goes by the same name as the dish, "posole". The un-popped kernels are boiled separately from the other ingredients until the kernels pop revealing the hominy-like form. To New Mexicans, posole is one of the most important of Christmas traditions. The Mexican spelling pozole is uncommon in New Mexico.
- Quelites – a traditional New Mexico side dish made with spinach sauteed in bacon fat with onion, garlic, pinto beans, and crushed, red, New Mexico chile flakes. Wild lamb's quarters were the original leafy green for this dish, but now it is extremely rare to find quelites made with them.
- Quesadilla – a grilled cheese sandwich of sorts in which two flour tortillas, or one folded, are used instead of bread. It is often lightly oiled and toasted on a griddle to melt the cheese, then served with either salsa, pico de gallo, chile, guacamole, and sour cream, as an appetizer or entrée.
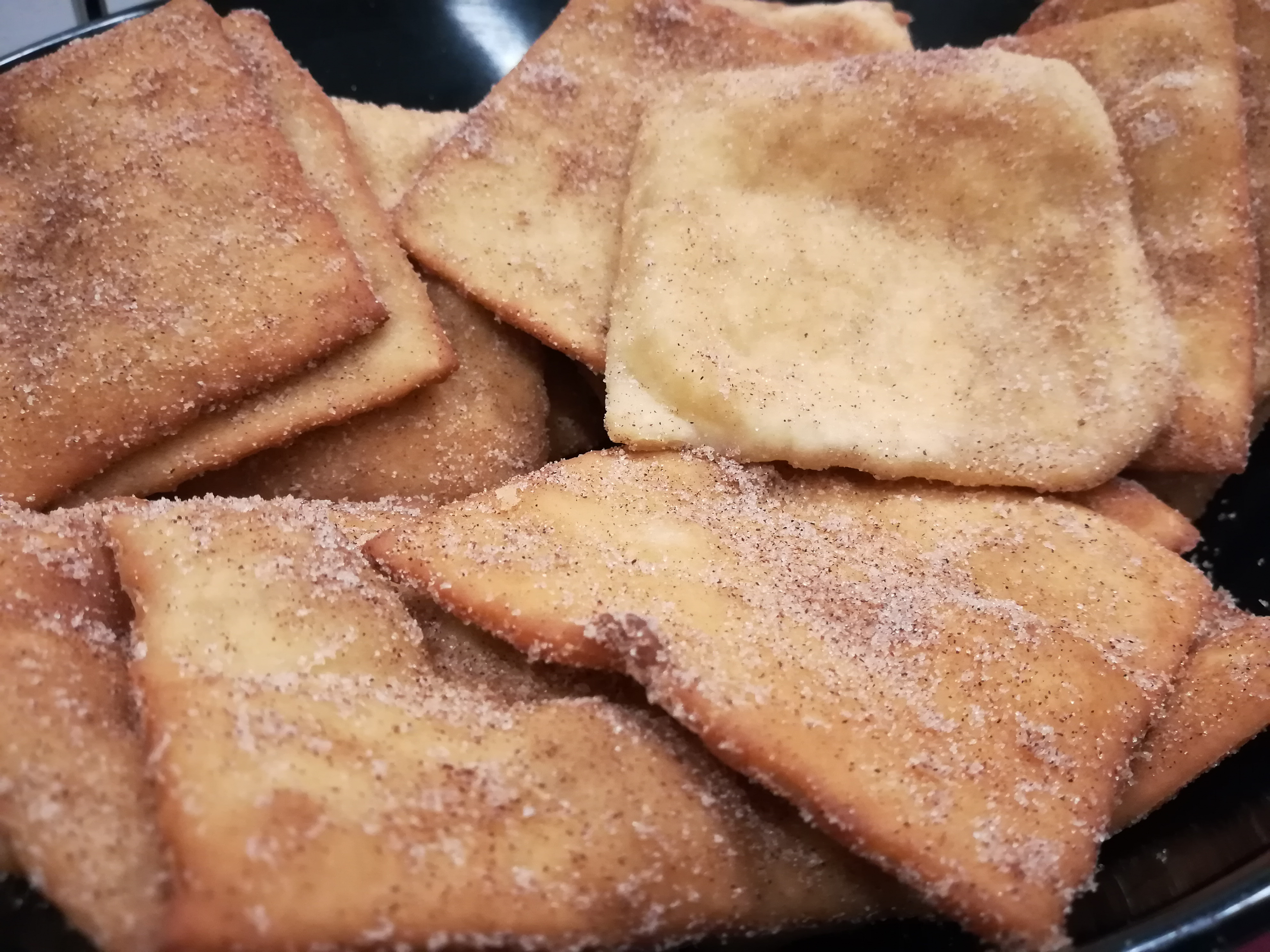
  Sopaipillas
- Sopaipilla (or sopapilla) – a puffed fried quick bread with a flavor similar to Indian fry bread. The New Mexico version is very large. It serves as a standard table bread at New Mexican restaurants with a squeeze bottle of honey or honey butter. Before the Great Depression in the 1930s, they were served with jelly or jam, and honey was used as a substitute; from then on, it became the traditional accompaniment. They can also become an entrée by stuffing them with savory ingredients such as ground beef, shredded chicken, and refried beans.
  - Stuffed sopapilla – a standard New Mexico entrée, stuffed with various fillings, covered with melted cheddar cheese, usually smothered with red or green chile sauce, and topped with shredded iceberg lettuce and diced tomatoes. Fillings include pinto beans, ground beef, shredded beef, shredded chicken, potatoes, Spanish rice, and carne adovada.
- Spanish rice: rice (arroz) with a tomato base and other ingredients, usually a mild dish, but may also be made spicy. Traditional New Mexico versions are made with long-grain rice, onion, and garlic. Rice may also be served in other fashions, and recipes vary.
- Salsa – an uncooked mixture of chiles/peppers, tomatoes, onions, frequently blended or mixed with tomato paste to produce a more sauce-like texture than pico de gallo; usually contains lemon juice or vinegar in noticeable quantities.
  The green-chile variant usually is mostly green chile and without tomatoes, though some varieties may use some cooked tomatillos; the style does not use avocado (which is very common in California green salsa).
  The New Mexico and California styles share a typically large amount of cilantro added to the mix. The word simply means 'sauce' in Spanish.
- Salsa picante, or picante sauce – a thin, vinegary, piquant (thus its name) sauce of pureéd red peppers and tomatoes with spices, reminiscent of a combination of New Mexico-style chile sauce and Louisiana-style tabasco pepper sauce. (Note: American commercial food producers have appropriated the term to refer simply to spicy packaged salsa.)
  Its place in Mexican, Tex-Mex and Californian food, where it is extremely common, especially as a final condiment to add more heat, has largely been supplanted by chile, especially red chile, in New Mexican cuisine.
- Taco – a corn tortilla fried into a trough shape, it is filled with meats or beans, and fresh chopped lettuce, onions, tomatoes, and cheese.
  The term can also refer to the soft, rolled flour-tortilla variety popularized by fast-food chains (a soft taco), and the flat, unfried corn style favored in Mexico (a "street taco"), but most corn tortillas for tacos are fried in New Mexican cuisine.
  The entire taco is not fried (a Mexican style known as taco dorado), just the shell. Compare taquito, tostada.
- Tamal (plural tamales, often anglicized as tamale singular) – meat rolled in cornmeal dough (masa), wrapped traditionally in corn husks (waxed paper is sometimes used for commercial versions), and steamed.
  Although there are many variations, the standard New Mexico tamal filling is shredded pork cooked in red chile sauce. New-Mexican tamales typically vary from other tamal styles in that red chile powder is typically blended into the masa.
- Taquito – a tightly rolled, deep-fried variant of the corn-tortilla taco, usually filled with beef or chicken; essentially the same as a Mexican taco dorado, but rolled into a tube shape rather than fried in wedge shape. Sometimes misspelled taquita. Compare chimichanga and flauta.
- Torta de huevo – a whipped-egg and wheat-flour pancake, typically topped with red chile, and often and it is then served with fideo (a vermicelli-style noodle), quelites (wild spinach), and beans. It is a traditional dish for Fridays during Lent; some New Mexican restaurants offer it as their Lenten special.
- Tortilla – a flatbread made predominantly either of unbleached white wheat flour or of cornmeal, with wheat flour tortillas the most common in ordinary use. New Mexico-style flour tortillas are typically thicker and less chewy than those found in Sonora, Mexico. Nevertheless, blue-corn tortillas are a quintessential New Mexico-style tortilla.
- Tostada – a corn tortilla is deep fried flat until hard and crispy and covered with refried beans, cheese, lettuce, and tomato, with additional toppings such as sour cream and guacamole also added.

=== Beverages ===
- Soda fountains were impactful on Route 66 culture, many restaurants including Duran's Central Pharmacy and Frontier Restaurant have roots as soda shops. Local soft drink companies produce unique flavors inspired by native ingredients like piñon, yucca root, prickly pear, red chile, watermelon (referencing Spanish translation for the Sandia Mountains, Sandía means watermelon in Spanish), crafting varieties such as piñon-flavored cola, sandía soda with watermelon and mint, yucca-flavored root beer, and red chile-flavored ginger ale.
- Chocolate Elixirs are unique drink to New Mexico, served as either chocolate milk and hot cocoa. With flavorings such as fruit, nuts, tea, coffee, etc. The drinks are inspired by the blend of honey sweetened beverages the Ancient Puebloans would make, from the xocoatl they would trade from the Aztecs. The Spanish opening up numerous trade routes expanded the flavorings incorporated into such drinks, for example the Southwest's unique New Mexico chile, Navajo cota tea, or Mormon herbal teas. Today the chocolate elixirs are made in local cafes.
- Coffee in New Mexico is often brewed strong in the style of traditional cowboy coffee. Local roasters frequently add regional touches, such as piñon flavoring or spices used in biscochitos, like cinnamon and anise. Companies such as New Mexico Piñon Coffee and Rio Grande Roasters distribute these flavors nationally, and the local New Mexico Piñon Coffee House chain is having a growing presence in the region.
- Merienda is a part of local hospitality scene, and gave rise to a regional British-style tea time with curated tea paired with traditional tea snacks and local additions like biscochitos and pastelitos.
- There is list of breweries in New Mexico producing craft beers and local pub fair. The state's craft beer has received national and international awards. One of North America's only native hops is the neomexicanus hop, a variety increasingly used in local brews.
- The margarita is a popular cocktail in New Mexico. Santa Fe's Margarita Trail features over 50 unique takes on the drink across local bars and restaurants. Local pub fair include blue corn fried pickles, red chile chicken wings, and fried green chile strips.
- New Mexico wine is home to the oldest wine grape tradition within American wine. Producers like Gruet Winery use the traditional méthode champenoise to craft sparkling wines, which have gained national acclaim.

== Restaurants and grocers ==
There have been several restaurants and restaurant chains serving New Mexican cuisine within New Mexico.

- Blake's Lotaburger
- El Modelo
- Frontier Restaurant
- Garduño's
- Little Anita's
- Mac's La Sierra
- Mac's Steak in the Rough
- Owl Bar and Cafe
- Twisters
- Sadie's

Outside the Southwestern United States, New Mexican cuisine can be found in restaurants, and several brands produce New Mexican products for grocery stores on a national scale.

In the Washington, D.C. area, the restaurant chain Anita's New Mexico Style was founded by the family of Anita Tallez of Little Anita's. Big Tent Revival and Little Big Town bassist Steve Dale started Sopapilla's in Franklin, Tennessee. The cuisine also has an international presence, such as Mesilla Kitchen in Okinawa, Japan.

Restaurants like Sadie's, El Pinto, and Garcia's distribute salsas nationally, while brands such as Bueno Foods, Cibolo Junction, Los Chileros, and 505 Southwestern offer ready-packed chile and other products. New Mexican-style tortillas are distributed nationally by Bueno Foods brand Grandma's and Gruma's Albuquerque Tortilla Company. Other brands, like Creamland, produce green chile dip locally and distribute it to neighboring states.

== See also ==
- Ancient Pueblo peoples
- Apache people
- Cuisine of the Southwestern United States
- Hispanos of New Mexico
- Navajo people
- List of breweries in New Mexico
- New Mexican English
- New Mexican Spanish
- New Mexico
- New Mexico chile
- New Mexico music
- New Mexico wine
- Pueblo
- Puebloan people
- Pueblo music
