= Sadie's =

American restaurant chain

Coordinates: 35°8′51″N 106°38′18″W

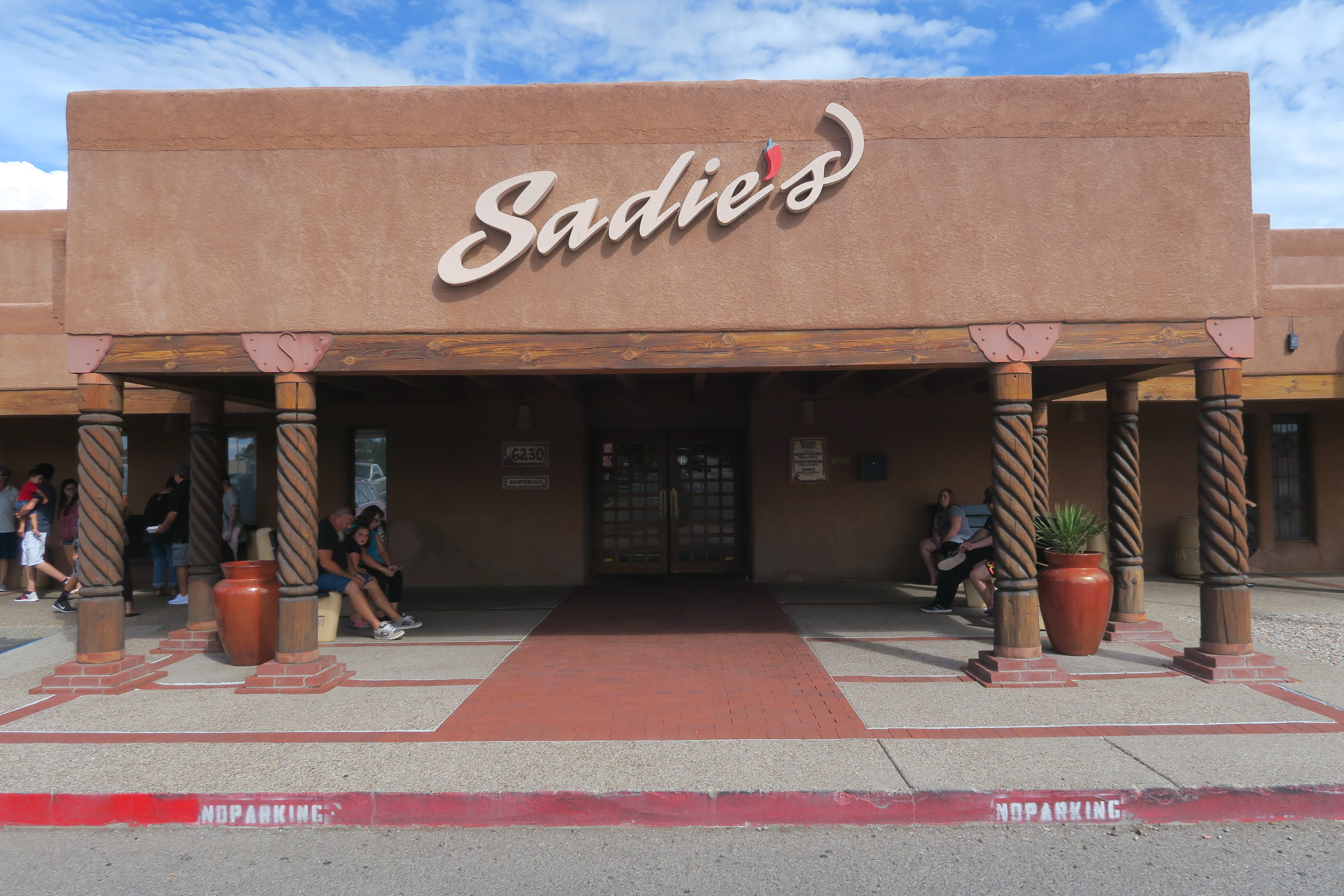
- Sadie's on 4th Street
- Company type: Privately held
- Industry: Casual dining
- Founded: Albuquerque, New Mexico, 1954
- Headquarters: Albuquerque, New Mexico, United States
- Number of locations: 3
- Area served: New Mexico
- Products: New Mexican cuisine
- Website: www.sadiesofnewmexico.com

Sadie's is a New Mexican cuisine restaurant chain from the city of Albuquerque, New Mexico. They have three locations in Albuquerque, and they also sell their own New Mexico chile, salsa, jerky, and other New Mexico related products throughout the United States and Canada.

== History ==
Sadie's of New Mexico was founded by Sadie Koury in 1954 in Albuquerque in a small still-extant building at 2nd and Osuna with just a short counter and a few spinning stool seats. Sadies's customer base then was mostly the US Highway 85 (2nd St) truckers hauling north and south freight through Albuquerque whose trucks were always seen parked across 2nd St from Sadie's. Sadie's sister Betty-Jo helped Sadie move the restaurant just over to spaces next to the Lark Bar next door, who ran the restaurant with Sadie until Sadie retired. Betty-Jo and her husband, Bob Stafford. Billy and Brian, the sons of Betty-Jo and Bob, worked at the 4th Street restaurant.

== Food challenge ==
A food challenge called "the world's largest New Mexican style sopapilla" was shown on Man v. Food, during the season 4 Man v. Food Nation tour. The challenge featured a 9-pound sopapilla filled with red and green New Mexico chile, carne adovada, beef, chicken, and cheese. The challenge was eventually taken off the menu in 2014, because only 11 people have ever been able to complete the challenge, but some professional eaters have been able to accept the challenge since.

== Reception ==
Officialbestof.com named Sadie's "Best New Mexican Restaurant" in 2011. In 2014 they won Scovie Awards' "Best Red Chile", and they got second place for "Green Chile" and "Mild" salsa.
