= Little Anita's =

Restaurant chain from Albuquerque, New Mexico

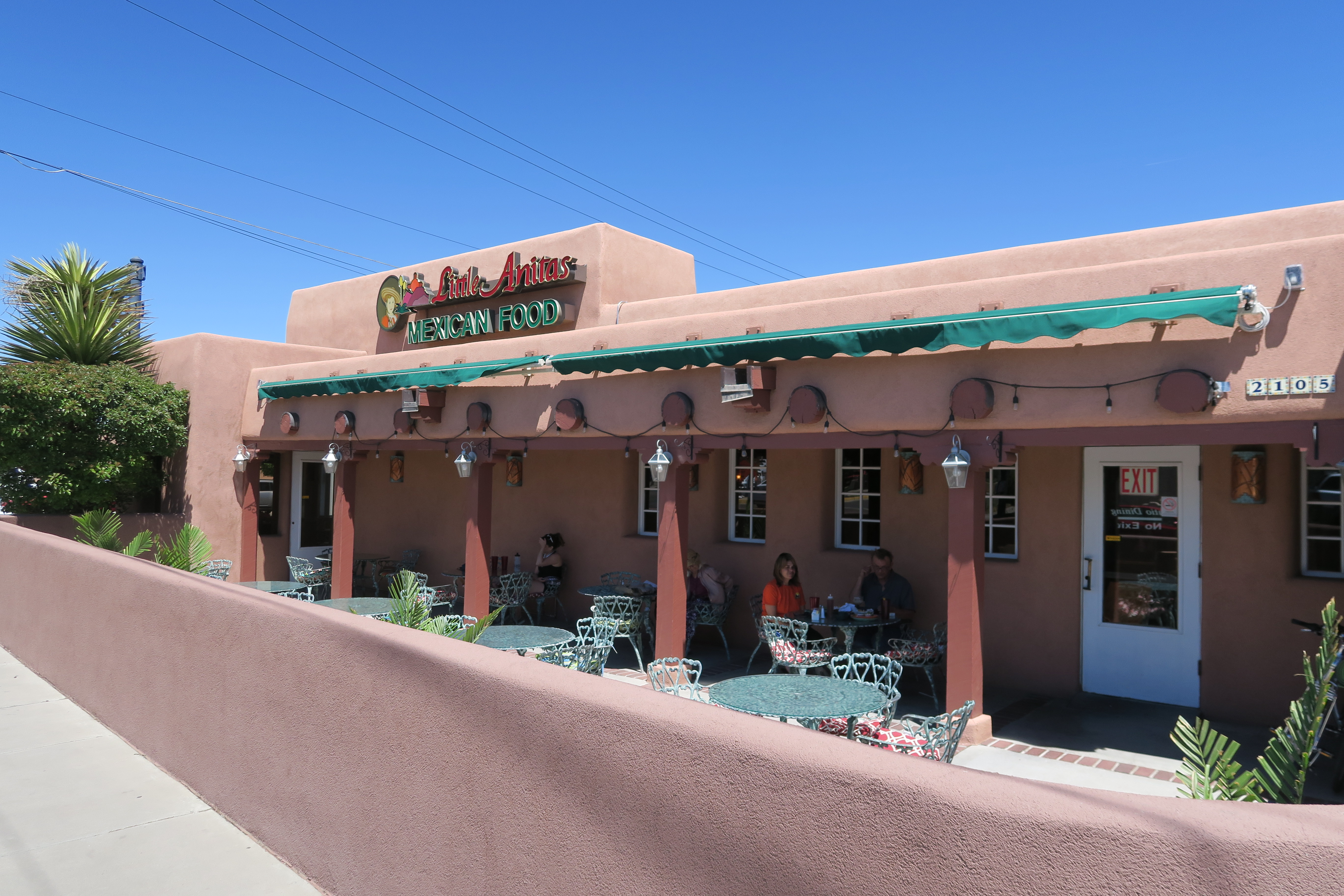
- Little Anita's
- Type: Privately held
- Industry: Casual dining
- Founded: Albuquerque, New Mexico, 1976
- Headquarters: Albuquerque, New Mexico, United States
- Number of locations: 13
- Area served: New Mexico and Colorado
- Products: Mexican and New Mexican cuisine
- Website: littleanitasrestaurants.com//

Little Anita's is a Mexican and New Mexican cuisine restaurant chain from Albuquerque, New Mexico. The chain has nine locations in Albuquerque and four in Colorado. The chain comprises its traditional casual dining locations as well as Little Anita's Express fast food restaurants.

== History ==
Anita Tellez is responsible for the creation of multiple restaurants across the United States, and her children and grandchildren often took over the individual restaurants. Little Anita's is a restaurant chain established in 1976. It was owned by her only grandchild, K. Starrs Ortiz, and was named after one of Mrs. Tellez's own great grandmothers. The restaurants have become well known in the Albuquerque, New Mexico restaurant scene since then. The chain expanded to Denver in 2001. Another chain of restaurants started by Anita Tellez, Anita's New Mexico Style, serves Little Anita's New Mexico inspired food in the Washington D.C. area. Both chains are independently owned but borrow heavily from each other's menus. There was also a solo Anita's restaurant in Fullerton, California.

== Specialties ==
The restaurants serve their critically acclaimed sopapillas and red/green chile-smothered foods, as well as other New Mexican fare like enchiladas made with blue corn, huevos rancheros, and green chile cheeseburgers.

== Reception ==
In Colorado, they have won multiple awards, including multiple accolades from Denver Westword, including "Best Taste of New Mexico" and "Best Red Chile".

== In popular culture ==
Their location at University Blvd. in Albuquerque was featured in Breaking Bad (season 5).
