= Blake Chanslor =

American businessman

- Born: Glen Blake Chanslor; June 8, 1920; Borger, Texas, U.S.
- Died: April 10, 2009 (aged 88); Albuquerque, New Mexico, U.S.
- Occupation: Restaurateur
- Years active: 1952–2009
- Known for: Founder of Blake's Lotaburger
- Children: 3

G. Blake Chanslor (June 8, 1920 – April 10, 2009) was an American businessman and philanthropist who founded the Blake's Lotaburger restaurant chain in 1952. Blake's Lotaburger is based in New Mexico.

Chanslor was born in Borger, Texas, on June 8, 1920. He served in the United States Navy during World War II. Chanslor moved to New Mexico following the end of the war.

Chanslor opened the first Lotaburger in 1952. Lotaburger priced a hamburger and a bag of potato chips at thirty-five cents at the time of its opening. He opened two more Lotaburger locations in 1953. He continued to own the company until 2003.

Chanslor sold Lotaburger in 2003. Lotaburger posted $30 million in sales and seventy-five locations throughout New Mexico at the time of the 2003 sale. As of 2009 The company is run by Ronald Rule and Brian Rule.

News reports listed Chanslor as a major donor to the Heart Hospital's New Heart Center for Wellness, Fitness and Rehabilitation in Albuquerque. he died on April 10 2009.
