= Mac's La Sierra =

- Interactive map of Mac's La Sierra

Restaurant information
- Established: 1952
- Dress code: Casual
- Location: 6217 Central Ave NW, Albuquerque, New Mexico, 87105, United States
- Coordinates: 35.081075°N 106.706574°W
- Website: www.macslasierraabq.com

Mac's La Sierra is a New Mexican cuisine restaurant in the city of Albuquerque, New Mexico. It is a landmark restaurant on U.S. Route 66.

== History ==
The restaurant has remained family owned since it was founded in 1952.

== Today ==
Mac's La Sierra serves their "steak in the rough", which is deep-fried steak fingers with french fries, as well as other New Mexican fair like huevos rancheros, Indian tacos, enchiladas, and green chile stew. The restaurant is a favorite of Steven Michael Quezada and Martin Chávez. It has also been a location by Martin Heinrich for his "Congress On Your Corner", and they catered during the opening of his campaign headquarters.
