= Eating culture of the Navajo Nation =

Aspect of Navajo life

The eating culture of the Navajo Nation is heavily influenced by the history of its people. The Navajo are a Native American people located in the southwestern United States whose location was a major influence in the development of their culture. As such, New World foods such as corn, boiled mutton, goat meat, acorns, potatoes, and grapes were used widely by the Navajo people prior to and during European colonization of the Americas.

Since then, the Navajo diet has become more homogenized with American cuisine but still retains distinct features of pre-colonized Navajo culture.

Following European expansion, the Navajo Nation was formed and today remains a large but impoverished entity within the United States. Like many Native American peoples, the Navajo Nation faces many problems related to poverty. The region of the United States occupied by the Navajo Nation is considered to be a food desert and a significantly disproportionate number of Navajo people face food insecurity relative to the average American.

== Background ==
Fry bread is a staple of traditional Navajo cuisine and considered a symbol of Native American perseverance due to its history.

The Navajo tribe dates back to the 1500s during which time their diet relied heavily on maize, much like other Native tribes. The rest of the Navajo diet was shaped by the foods available in their region, and as such consisted in large part of foods such as pumpkins, yucca, elk, cottontail rabbits, mutton, and acorns, among others. Also like other Native tribes, the Navajo depended on women to cook and serve food. Navajo cooking was similar to that of other Native tribes in the region in that it made use of hornos, or clay ovens, in which food was cooked by starting a wood fire inside. The fire was left to burn itself out, the ashes were either removed or pushed to the back of the horno, and the food to be cooked replaced them. Other utensils used widely by the Navajo prior to European contact included tongs, stirring sticks, kettles, and ladles. Mutton, boiled, and corn were also the principal food of Navajo Nation, which are prepared in most ways. Their diet established in Bosque Redondo, which consists the same too. Claims of their dislike of pork and bacon, which dates from Bosque Redondo days due to illness out-of consumption of poorly cooked pork.

One of the Navajo's biggest cultural staples is fry bread, largely due to its history. In the mid-1800s, the Navajo were forced by the United States government to walk from their lands in Arizona to Bosque Redondo in New Mexico, a walk along which hundreds of Navajo died. Bosque Redondo was not conducive to the Navajo's usual diet, and the Navajo were given by the government flour, salt, water, powdered milk, lard, sugar, and baking powder to use in cooking. From those ingredients, the Navajo created fry bread, and it has since become a significant part of Navajo culture and of several other Native cultures as a symbol of perseverance.

Shortly following the removal of the Navajo from Arizona and the creation of the Navajo Nation, the Navajo assimilated much more with mainstream American culture, and pre-colonial cultural traditions began to figure less and less in the daily lives of the Navajo people.

== Present day ==
Today, the Navajo have largely conformed to the norms of American society; this is by and large reflected in their eating habits. Government subsidy programs have contributed to a shift in focus in Native diets at large from traditional habits to modern, processed foods, whose nutritional value differs greatly from that of traditional Native foods. Research shows that this trend may be amplified in the Navajo Nation more than in other Native tribes.

Additionally, some restaurants across the United States today now specialize in serving Native American food. In some of these locations, fry bread is served, signifying its cultural significance to both the Navajo people and Native Americans as a whole.

=== Food insecurity ===
Like most Native American organizations in the United States, the Navajo Nation is heavily impoverished. Unemployment and poverty levels in the Navajo Nation are both well above the national average and over three quarters of people living in the Navajo Nations report some level of food insecurity according to research done by the Center for Human Nutrition at Johns Hopkins University in 2006 and 2007.

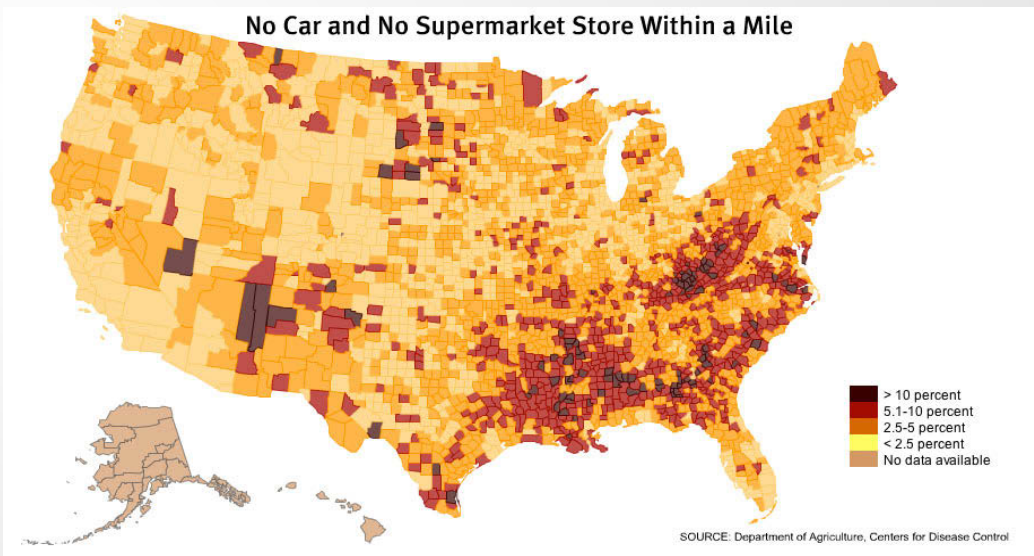
A map of "food deserts" within the United States. Many parts of the southwestern U.S., including many parts of the Navajo Nation, are considered to be food deserts.

The same study notes that the region is a food desert, with only ten supermarkets on the Navajo Nation. A 2014 collaborative study released by the American Journal of Health, however, conducted a study in the Navajo Nation using a sample of sixty-three stores. Of those stores, thirteen were supermarkets. The study indicated, however, that nine of the thirteen supermarkets were located in border towns and that it used every known supermarket on the Navajo Nation in its study, indicating that as of 2014, only thirteen supermarkets exist in the region.

The study went on to find, additionally, that healthier foods were more easily accessible in supermarkets than in convenience stores, and that in both convenience stores and supermarkets, healthier foods were more expensive than unhealthy foods. The study noted that of the fifty convenience stores surveyed, half accepted WIC benefits while a majority accepted SNAP as a method of payment, and drew a possible correlation between poverty among the Navajo people and unhealthy eating.

=== Other health concerns ===
Much like other Native peoples and other non-white ethnic groups, the Navajo today are at a much greater risk of being overweight or obese than the average American. In the Johns Hopkins University study mentioned above, 82.5% of participants were either overweight or obese. Obesity rates in the Navajo Nation were not the focus of the study; however, the study points out that its findings are consistent with an earlier study conducted by the Robert Wood Johnson Foundation.

The Johnson Foundation study found that between 1995-1996 and 2005-2006, obesity rates spiked twenty five percent among Native Americans and Alaska Natives.

Studies have also shown diabetes to be a major health problem in the Navajo Nation; a 1997 study released by the American Society for Nutritional Services found that 22.9% of Navajo people aged 20 or over had Diabetes Mellitus; the figure for people aged 45 and older was 40%. A later study released in 2010 by the Diabetes Care journal made similar finds. Relative to the average American, Native Americans and Alaska Natives were found to be three-to-four times as likely to have diabetes and three-to-five-and-a-half times as likely to have type II diabetes. Native individuals with diabetes were also found to be far more likely to suffer from hypertension, renal failure, neuropathy, mental disorders, and liver disease. There was also found to be an extraordinary correlation between Native American diabetics and substance abuse as well as Native Americans and amputations. Native Americans living with diabetes were found to be around fifteen times as likely to practice substance abuse as commercially insured U.S. adults, and similarly were about fourteen-and-a-half times as likely to need an amputation.

A 2013 study released by the American Society for Nutrition found that programs designed to promote healthy eating at the level of the seller had a slight impact on weight problems in the Navajo Nation. The study found that the experimental group, in which health promotional tactics were employed, saw obesity rates fall 7.5 percent from 47.9% while the overweight and obese combined rate fell from 87.5% to 85.1%. The control group saw inverse effects: obesity rates rose 4.4%, though the overweight and obese combined rate fell similarly as in the experimental group, by 2.2%.
