= Bizcochito =

Cookie originating in New Mexico

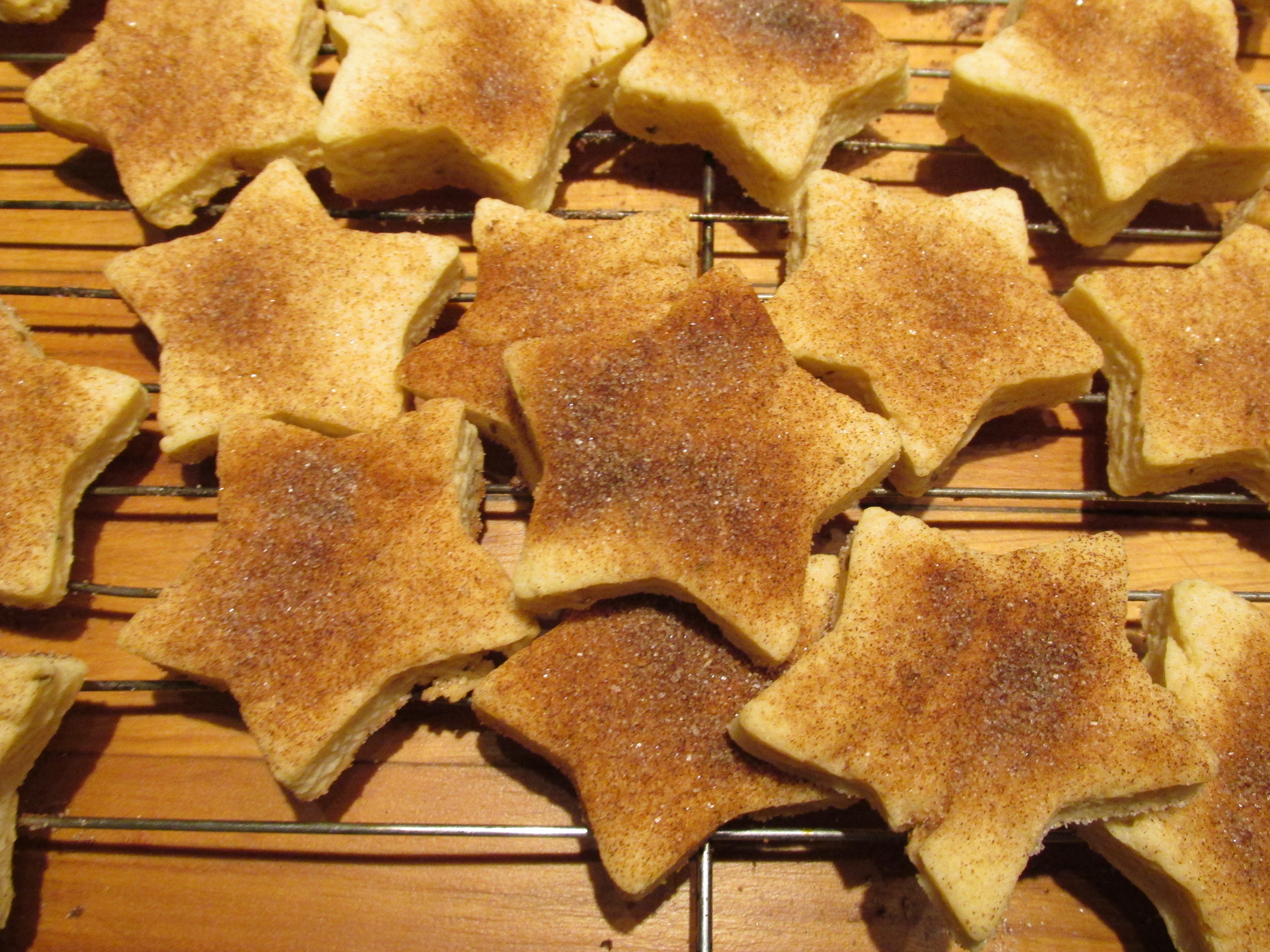
- A fresh batch of biscochitos
- Alternative names: Biscochito
- Type: Cookie
- Place of origin: Nuevo México, New Spain
- Region or state: New Mexico, U.S.
- Associated cuisine: New Mexican cuisine
- Main ingredients: Butter or pork lard, anise, cinnamon, flour

The bizcochito or biscochito (Note: diminutive of the Spanish: bizcocho, pronounced /ˌbɪskoʊˈtʃiːtoʊ/ or in New Mexican Spanish [ˌbiskoˈʃito]) is a New Mexican crisp butter cookie made with lard, flavored with sugar, cinnamon, and anise. The dough is rolled thin and cut into the shape of the fleur-de-lis, the Christian cross, a star, or a circle, symbolizing the moon.

The cookie was developed in New Mexico over the centuries from the first Spanish colonists of what was then known as Santa Fe de Nuevo México. The roots of this pastry date back as far as the Battle of Puebla in 1862, where French Emperor Maximilian was overthrown by the Mexicans. This date is now famously recognized in the United States as Cinco de Mayo, literally the "Fifth of May".

Biscochitos are commonly served during celebrations such as wedding receptions, baptisms, and religious (especially Catholic) holidays, and frequently during the Christmas season. They are also usually served with coffee.

== State cookie ==
In 1989, the U.S. State of New Mexico made the bizcochito its official state cookie, making New Mexico the first U.S. state to have an official state cookie. It was chosen to help maintain traditional home-baked cookery. As of January 2026, New Mexico remains one of only four states with a state cookie, alongside Massachusetts's chocolate-chip cookie, Alabama's yellowhammer cookie, and North Carolina's Moravian spice cookies.

Lupe Jackson, a New Mexican native, won first prize in a New England cookie contest in 2008 for her Bizcochito recipe—overcoming the Huckabees' snickerdoodles and the Romneys' Welsh skillet cakes.

== See also ==
- New Mexican cuisine
- List of cookies
- List of U.S. state foods
