= Breakfast burrito =

Breakfast entree

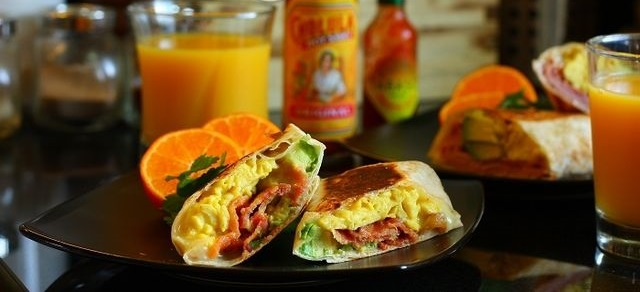
- A typical breakfast burrito in San Diego. (egg, avocado, cheese, bacon)
- Course: Main dish
- Place of origin: United States, Mexico
- Region or state: New Mexico
- Associated cuisine: New Mexican cuisine and the Southwestern United States
- Serving temperature: Hot
- Main ingredients: eggs, potatoes, wrapped in a tortilla.
- Ingredients generally used: bacon, sausage, meat, onions, cheese, etc.
- Variations: In the state of New Mexico, instead of other peppers or chorizo, it has red and/or green New Mexico chile.

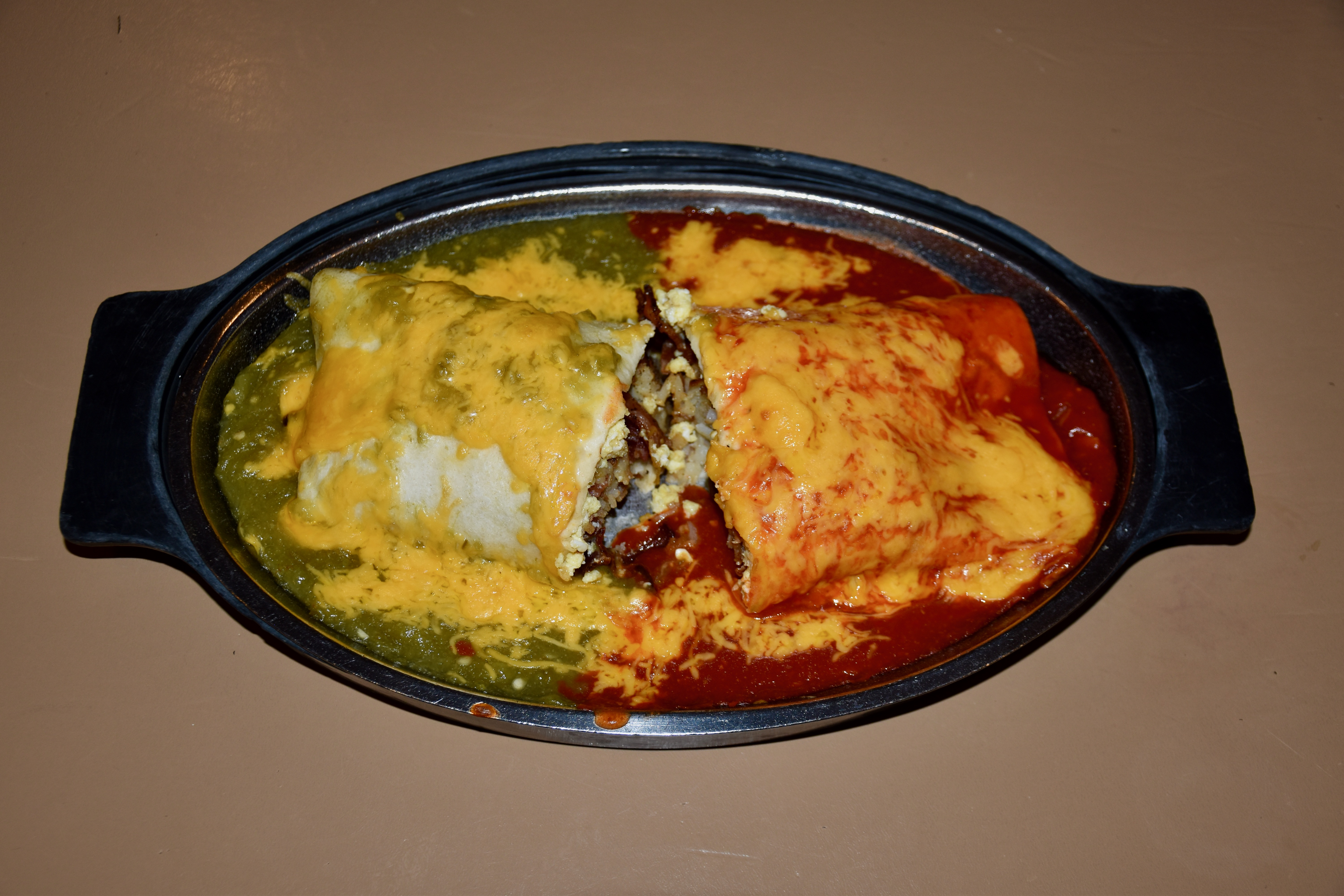
A smothered, Christmas-style New Mexican breakfast burrito from Tia Sophia's restaurant in Santa Fe, New Mexico

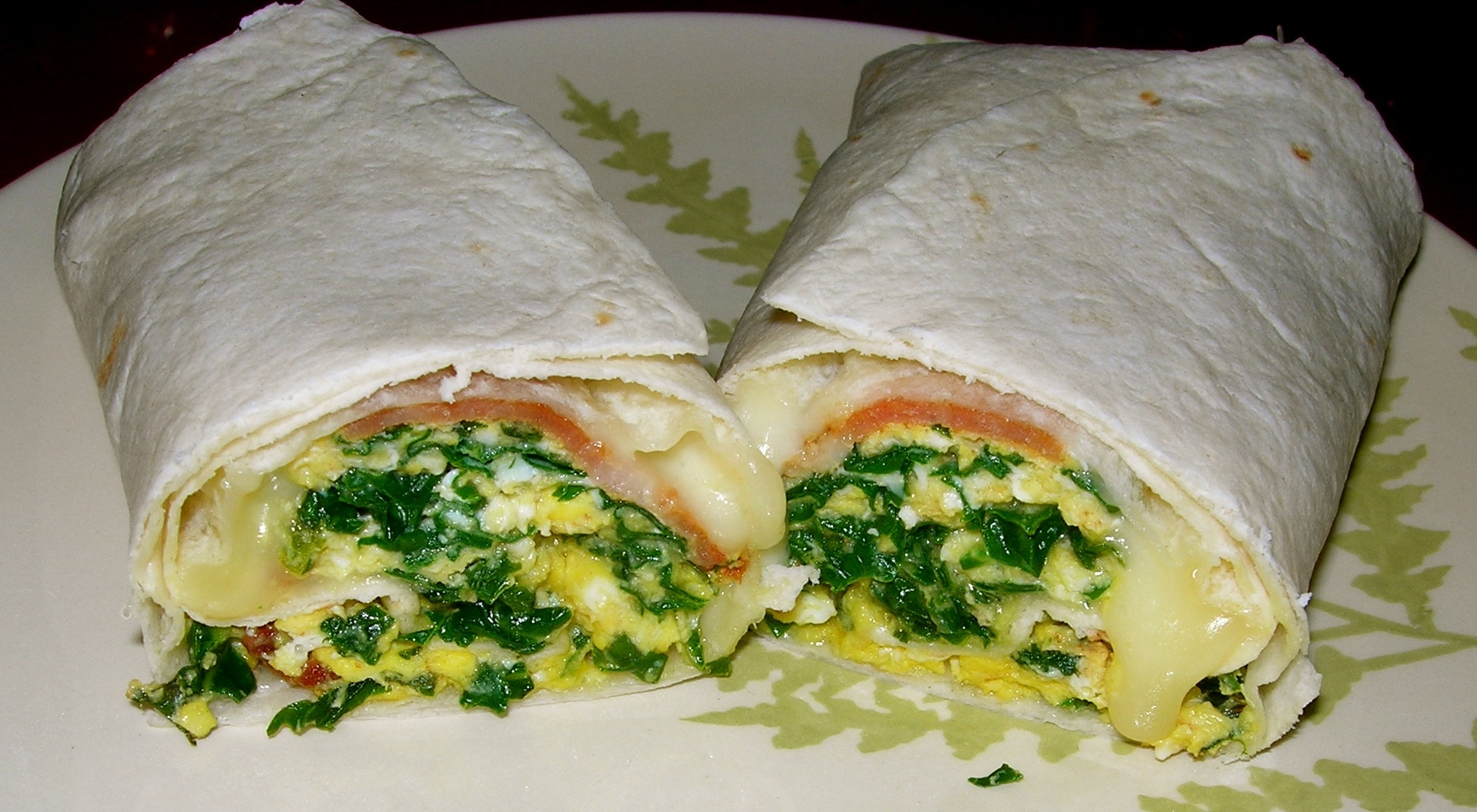
A breakfast burrito prepared with cheese, bacon, kale and other ingredients

The breakfast burrito (Spanish: Burrito de desayuno), sometimes referred to as a breakfast wrap outside of the American Southwest, is a variety of American breakfast composed of breakfast items wrapped inside a flour tortilla burrito. This style was invented and popularized in several regional American cuisines, most notably originating in New Mexican cuisine, and expanding beyond Southwestern cuisine and neighboring Tex-Mex. Southwestern-style breakfast burritos may include any combination of scrambled eggs, potatoes, beans, cheese, peppers (usually New Mexico chile, jalapeño, or other chili peppers), salsa, onions, chorizo, bacon, or sour cream. In other variations of breakfast burritos, more ingredients such as tomatoes, cheese, ham, and other fresh products can be added.

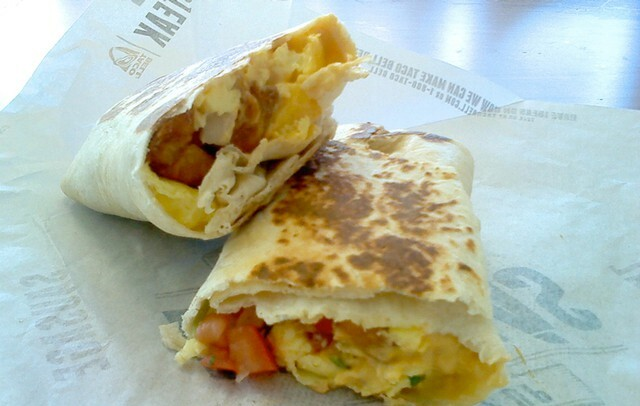
One of Taco Bell's breakfast burritos after the addition of breakfast burritos to their menu. Prepared with eggs, potatoes, and more ingredients common in the fast food scene.

Some fast food restaurants such as Burger King, Dunkin' Donuts, McDonald's, and Taco Bell sell breakfast burritos. The breakfast burrito is also a popular street food, and street-style breakfast burritos are found in the food truck scene in places such as Los Angeles.

== History ==
Tia Sophia's, a New Mexican diner in Santa Fe, claims the first use of the term "breakfast burrito" on a menu, in 1975, although a rolled tortilla containing some combination of eggs, bacon, potatoes, and cheese existed in New Mexican cuisine well before that. Fast food giant McDonald's introduced their version in the late 1980s, and by the 1990s, more fast food restaurants caught on to the style, with Sonic Drive-In, Hardee's, and Carl's Jr. offering breakfast burritos on their menus. In 2014, Taco Bell launched their breakfast menu, which included breakfast burritos.

== Preparation ==
The breakfast burrito can be prepared with a myriad of filling ingredients, such as eggs, ham, cheese, onion, chile or bell peppers, bacon, Canadian bacon, potatoes, sausage, avocado, tomato, spinach, beans, and olives. In New Mexico, breakfast burritos are often served "smothered" (covered with a chile sauce) or "handheld" (with chile sauce or chopped green chile inside). It is usually served heated up or cooked.

== See also ==
- Breakfast sandwich
- Breakfast taco
- Breakfast roll
- List of American foods
- List of breakfast foods
- Omelette
- Wrap (sandwich)
