= Sopaipilla =

Fried pastry of Latin America and the United States

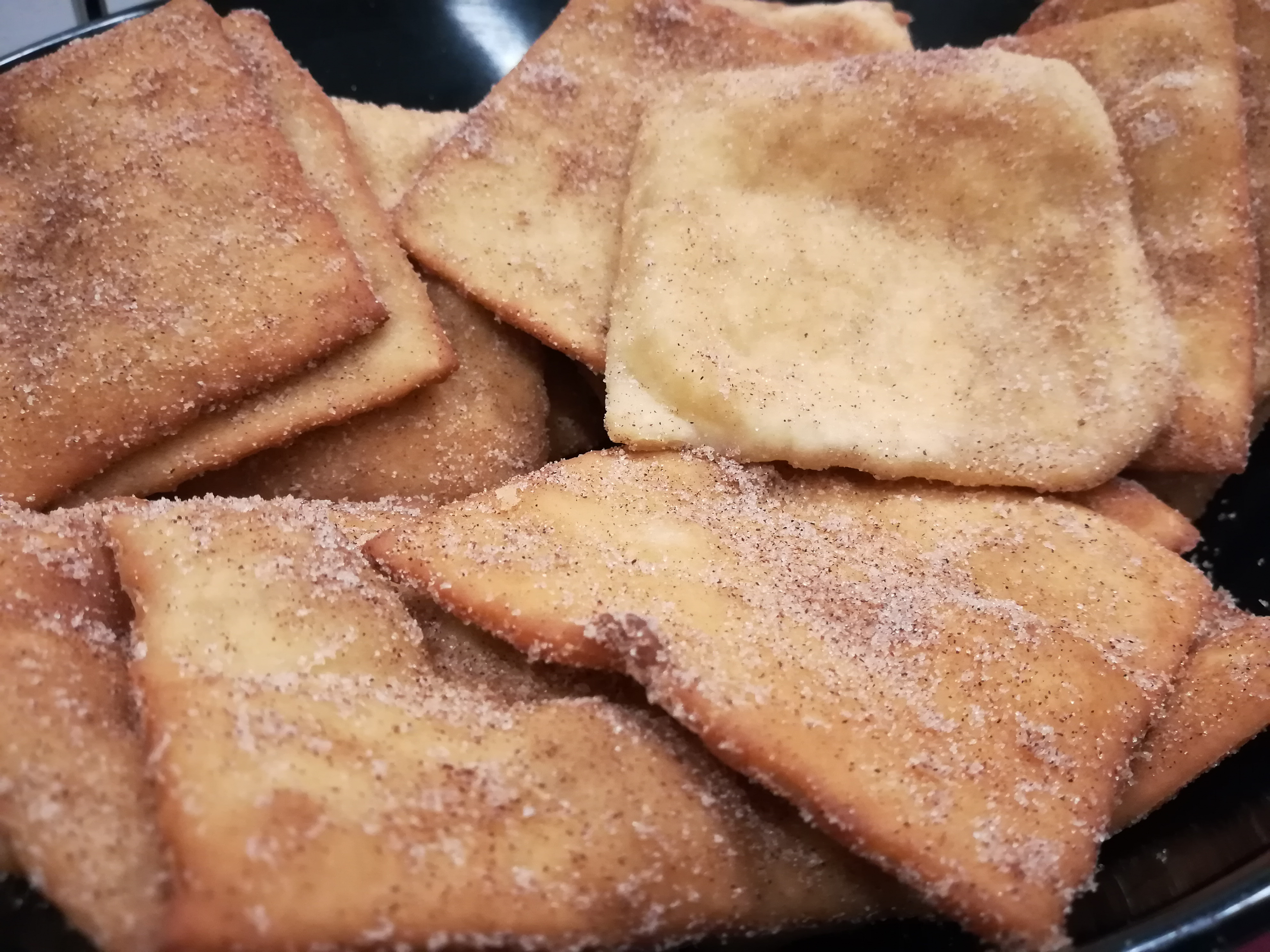
- New Mexican dessert sopapillas
- Course: Sopaipilla
- Place of origin: Chile, Mexico
- Region or state: South America
- Main ingredients: Leavening agent, wheat dough (or wheat flour and masa harina), shortening or butter

A sopaipilla, sopapilla, sopaipa, torta frita or cachanga is a kind of fried pastry and a type of quick bread served in several regions with Spanish heritage in the Americas. (Note: The places where sopaipilla are served include Argentina, Bolivia, Chile, New Mexico (U.S.), Colorado (U.S.), Peru, Texas (U.S.), Uruguay and Northern Mexico.) The word sopaipilla is the diminutive of sopaipa, a word that entered Spanish from the Mozarabic language of Al-Andalus. The original Mozarabic word Xopaipa was used to mean bread soaked in oil. The word is derived in turn from the Germanic word suppa, which meant bread soaked in liquid.

A sopaipilla is traditionally made from leavened wheat dough (or a mixture of wheat flour and masa harina) to which some shortening such as butter is added. After being allowed to rise, the dough is rolled into a sheet that is then cut into circular, square or triangular shapes, 8–10 centimetres (3.1–3.9 in) in size for the longest dimension (if intended for a dessert) or 15–20 centimetres (5.9–7.9 in) (if intended to be stuffed for a main course). These pieces are then deep-fried in oil, sometimes after being allowed to rise further before frying: the frying causes them to puff up, ideally forming a hollow pocket in the center.

== History ==
In ancient times, frying cakes was a primitive substitute for baking, requiring only fire and a simple vessel. Dishes of similar type have been developed independently across countless cultures on each habitable continent. Sopaipilla is a version found in Latin American cuisine, Tex-Mex cuisine and the cuisine of the Southwestern United States.

== Variations ==
There are yeasted and quick bread variations of sopaipillas. Some batters are enriched by the addition of pumpkin (Spanish: zapallo).

=== Argentina ===
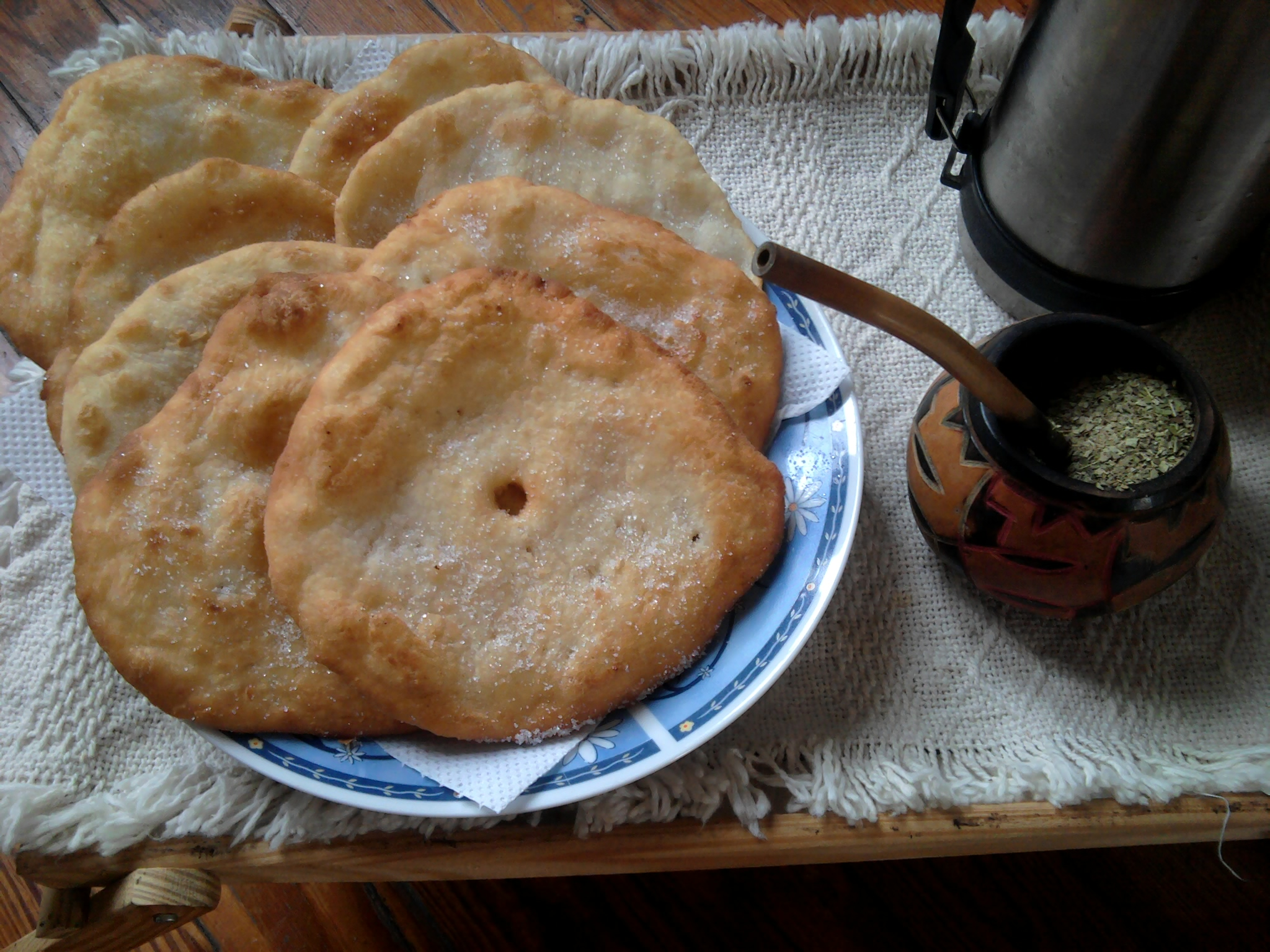
Torta frita, Argentina and Uruguay

In Argentina, this pastry is known under other names apart from sopaipa, supaipa and sopaipilla including torta frita, kreppel (from regional German Kreppel), and chipá cuerito.

=== Chile ===
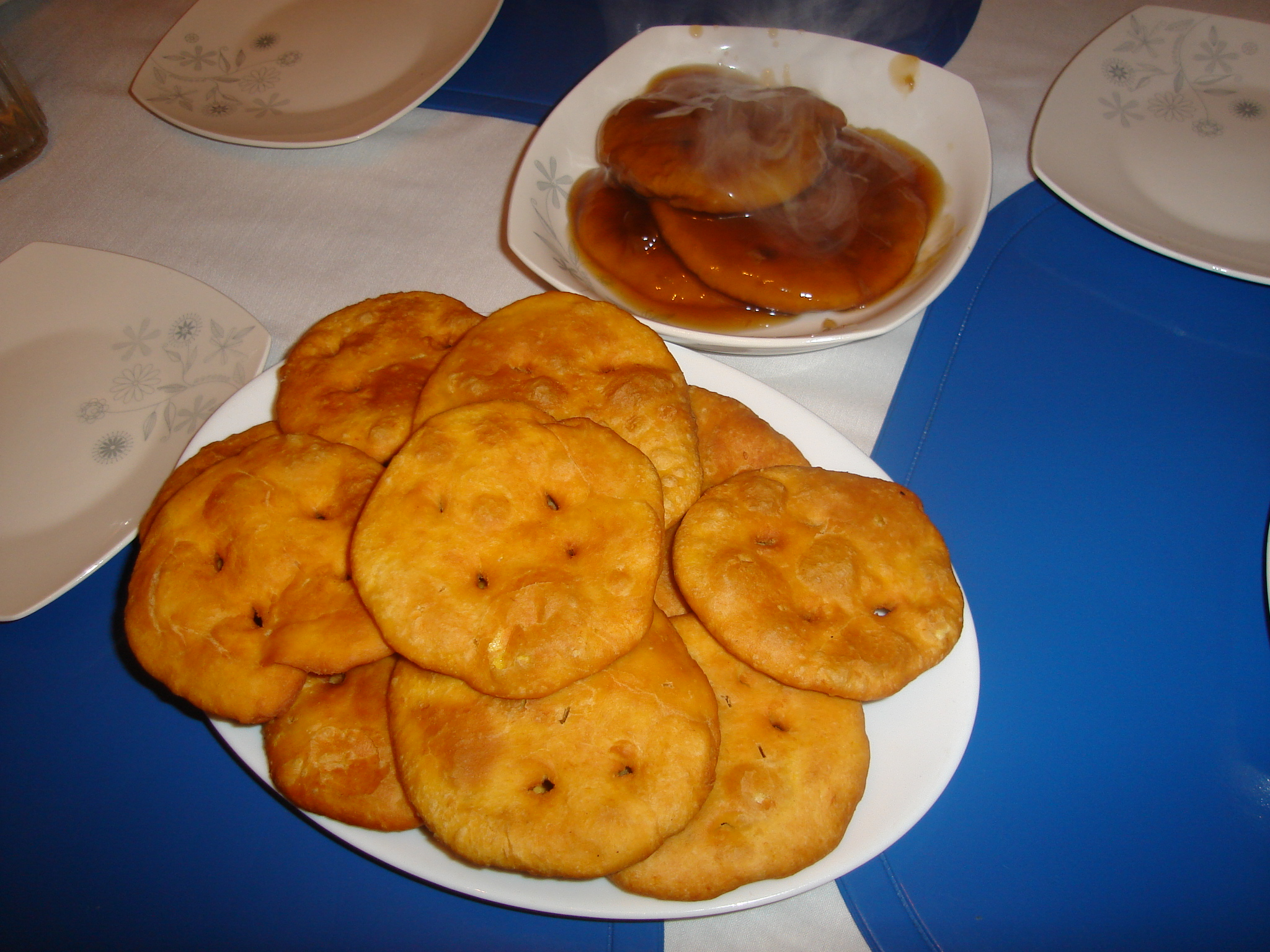
Central Chilean sopaipillas pasadas (soaked), with and without chancaca sauce

In Chile, sopaipillas (or sopaipas) are known to have been eaten at least since 1726. Although traditional Chilean sopaipillas made in central Chile include cooked ground pumpkin in their dough, this is typically not the case in the south. Depending if they are served as a pastry or bread Chilean sopaipillas are traditionally served with either pebre (a sauce of chili pepper, onion, garlic and coriander) or boiled in chancaca sauce (a homemade hot syrup cooked with panela, orange peel and cinnamon, and then they are called sopaipillas pasadas). They are also served with mustard, ketchup, hot butter, avocado or cheese. In Chile sopaipillas are traditionally homemade and eaten during days of heavy rain, as well as enjoying widespread popularity as street food, especially during winter. Chilean sopaipillas are round and flat, sporting holes pricked through the centre of the dough, usually by a fork.

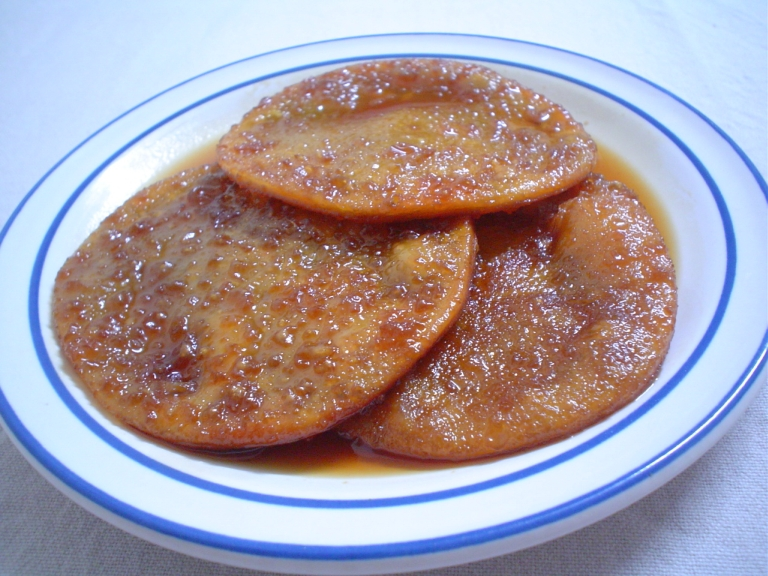
Sopaipillas pasadas is the name given to Central Chilean sopaipillas served with chancaca sauce

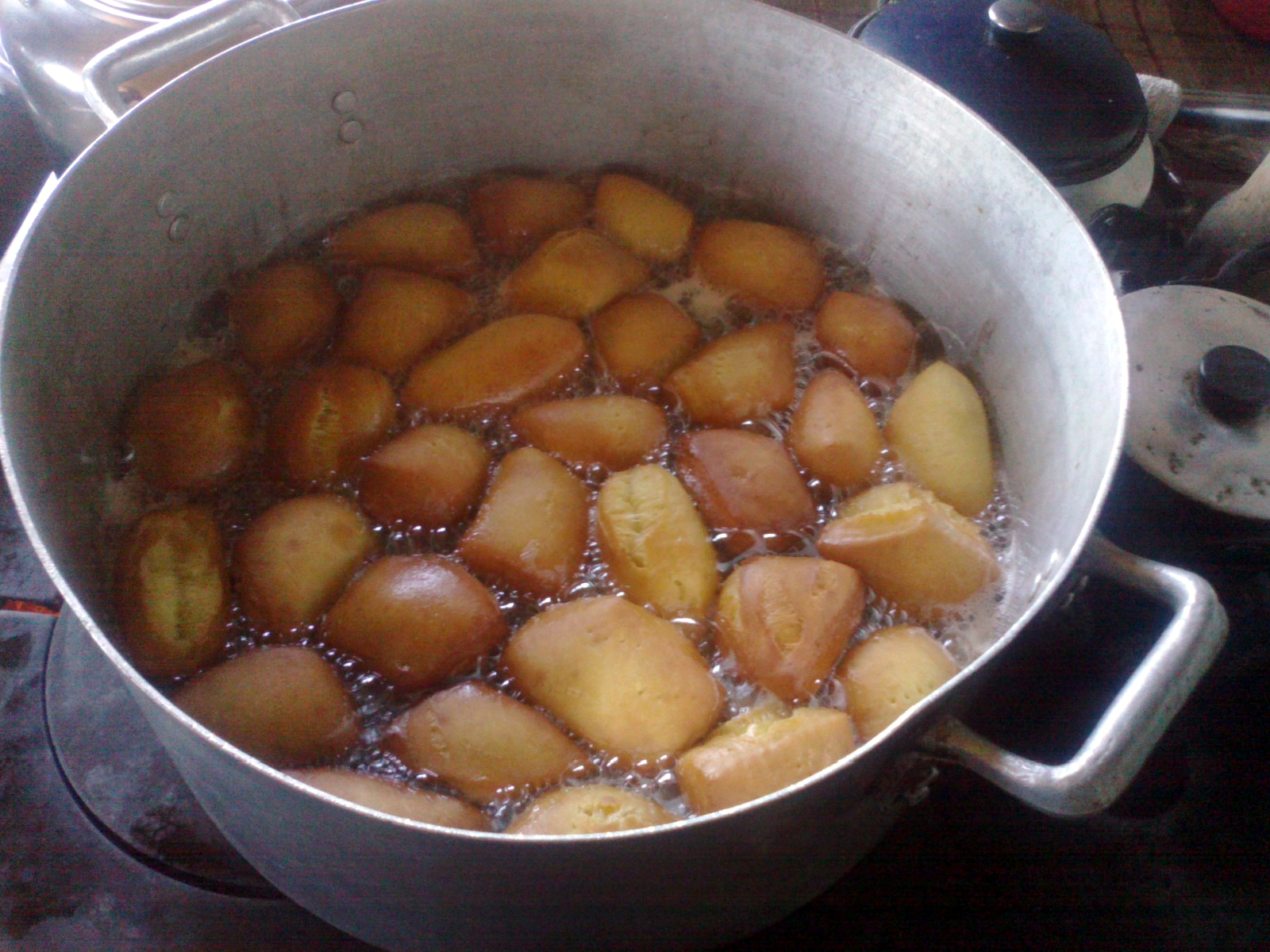
Sopaipillas from the Chiloé Archipelago

In the Chiloé Archipelago to the south, sopaipillas have a rhomboid form. They are a relevant ingredient in reitimientos, a traditional feast related to rendering fats after a pig slaughter.

=== Peru ===
In Peru, the name for this fried pastry is cachanga, and it may be either sweet or sour. Generally prepared during breakfast time, this traditional food of the Peruvian cuisine is prepared differently depending on the region, with one of the recipes involving the usage of cinnamon. The main difference between this form of sopaipilla and the other versions is that they are larger, thinner, and more rigid.

=== United States ===
Sopapillas in New Mexican cuisine are pillow-shaped fried pastry dough, distinct from Latin American variations. Similar to Native American frybread, they are typically served as a bread, and used to mop up sauces, scoop up tidbits, dab up flavors, or are shredded into stews. It has been called "the doughnut of the Southwest", while other authors have said "this non-yeasted, simply flavored bread is definitely not a donut, but it's not really a fritter either".

They are also commonly served as an appetizer, served with honey.

As a relatively recent innovation, originating in northern New Mexico, sopaipillas are often filled with savory ingredients such as ground beef or chicken, covered with chile and cheese, heated, and served with lettuce and tomato as an entree. They are also eaten as a dessert, drizzled with honey or anise syrup.

Sopaipillas in Tex-Mex cuisine are a puffed pastry, but otherwise similar to New Mexican-style sopaipillas, except that they are always served as a dessert item, coated with cinnamon sugar and served with honey. Many Tex-Mex restaurants in Texas and Oklahoma will serve dessert sopaipillas as part of the complimentary "set-up": chips and salsa served before the meal, along with sometimes queso sauce, pickled vegetables and flour tortillas and sopaipillas served at the end of the meal.

Sopaipilla and strudel were together designated as Texas' state pastries from 2003 to 2005.

=== Uruguay ===
In Uruguay, a variant of the sopaipilla is known as torta frita (Spanish for 'fried cake'). They are made of flour, salt and water and shortened with tallow, stretched into a thin large sheet of dough (20-25 cm), and fried in tallow. They are usually salty, but it is a common custom to cover them with sugar or quince cheese and eat them as a snack. They are commonly prepared on rainy days.

== See also ==
- Buñuelo
- Fry bread
- Gnocco fritto
- List of quick breads
- List of doughnut varieties
- List of fried dough varieties
- Dessert chimichangas
