= Cuisine of the Southwestern United States =

Food eaten in the southwestern United States

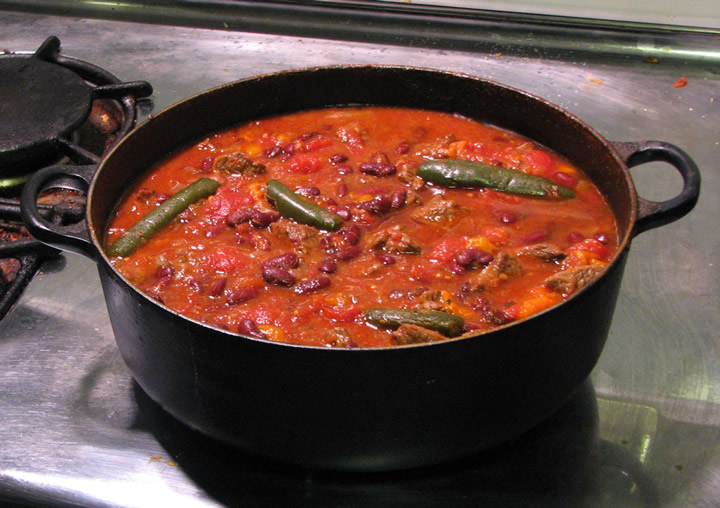
A pot of chili con carne, a spicy stew made with ground beef, chilies, beans, and tomatoes, popular in Tex-Mex cuisine

The cuisine of the Southwestern United States is food styled after the cooking of the Oasisamerican Native Americans, Hispanos of New Mexico, caballero, cowboys, hillbillies, and Mexican Americans.

One such style within the Southwest is New Mexican cuisine, named after the state of New Mexico and the Southwest's historical naming convention of Nuevo México. It is most popular in the states of New Mexico, Colorado, Arizona, Southern Nevada and Utah. This cuisine is known for its use of New Mexico chile; the majority of the crop is grown in Hatch, New Mexico. A hallmark of New Mexican cuisine is smothering dishes with either red chile, green chile, or both (a combination referred to as "Christmas"). Beyond chiles, it incorporates flavors such as piñon, and dishes such as breakfast burritos, biscochitos, and sopapillas. Another popular variety is the Tejano foods from Texan cuisine, called Tex-Mex, which includes dishes like fajitas and from Texan barbecue. Additionally, parts of Arizona’s Southwestern cuisine are often called Sonoran, named after the Mexican state of Sonora and the Sonoran Desert that covers a third of the state, and include dishes like Sonoran hot dogs.

A number of casual dining and fast food restaurants specializing in Southwestern cuisine have become popular in the United States. Several brands specialize in Southwestern foods for grocers.

== History ==
When New Mexico was still part of New Spain and the Republic of Mexico, regional ingredients were more limited, with few imports supplementing locally grown food. This gave New Mexican cuisine its unique palate.

All cooking was done at home by women who toasted whole spices and ground corn by hand using metates. Hunters made "jerky", in the style of New Mexican carne seca, with game meats, fish and wild birds. Fruits and vegetables were sun-dried in preparation for the winter.

Food was slow-cooked in iron or copper pots over open fires, and the only imported items were non-perishables from New Spain—coffee, sugar and spices.

The expansion of the railway system allowed the importation of milled flour and corn meal, sugar, lemons, oranges and other ingredients from "the States".

Traditional ways of cooking were eventually replaced by iron stoves. The basic chile, beans and corn dishes from Mexican cuisine evolved over time and in modern form often substitute extremely hot peppers and condiments for the subtle, balanced spicing of authentic Mexican cuisine. Native Americans and Hispanos developed the earliest forms of New Mexico chile to supplement this taste.

By the early 20th-century tostadas, "chile joints" and home-cooked "chile suppers" and tamale vendors had become part of the cultural landscape.

== Characteristics ==
The staple ingredients of Southwestern cuisine are corn, squash and beans. Called the "three sisters", they have been staples of North-American agriculture since ancient times. Beans are served whole or refried, and both styles can be used as filling for tostadas, tacos, burritos and similar dishes. Many bean varieties are consumed but the pinto bean is the most iconic bean of southwestern cuisine.

Southwestern food is distinguished by the use of chili peppers as the primary seasoning, first brought to Santa Fe with the arrival of the Spanish from Mexico.

Chili peppers are used as a topping for a majority of dishes from pizza to bagels, or just fried tempura-style and eaten whole. Many dishes, from burritos to scrambled eggs, are served with plentiful amounts of chili sauce.

== States ==
=== Arizona ===
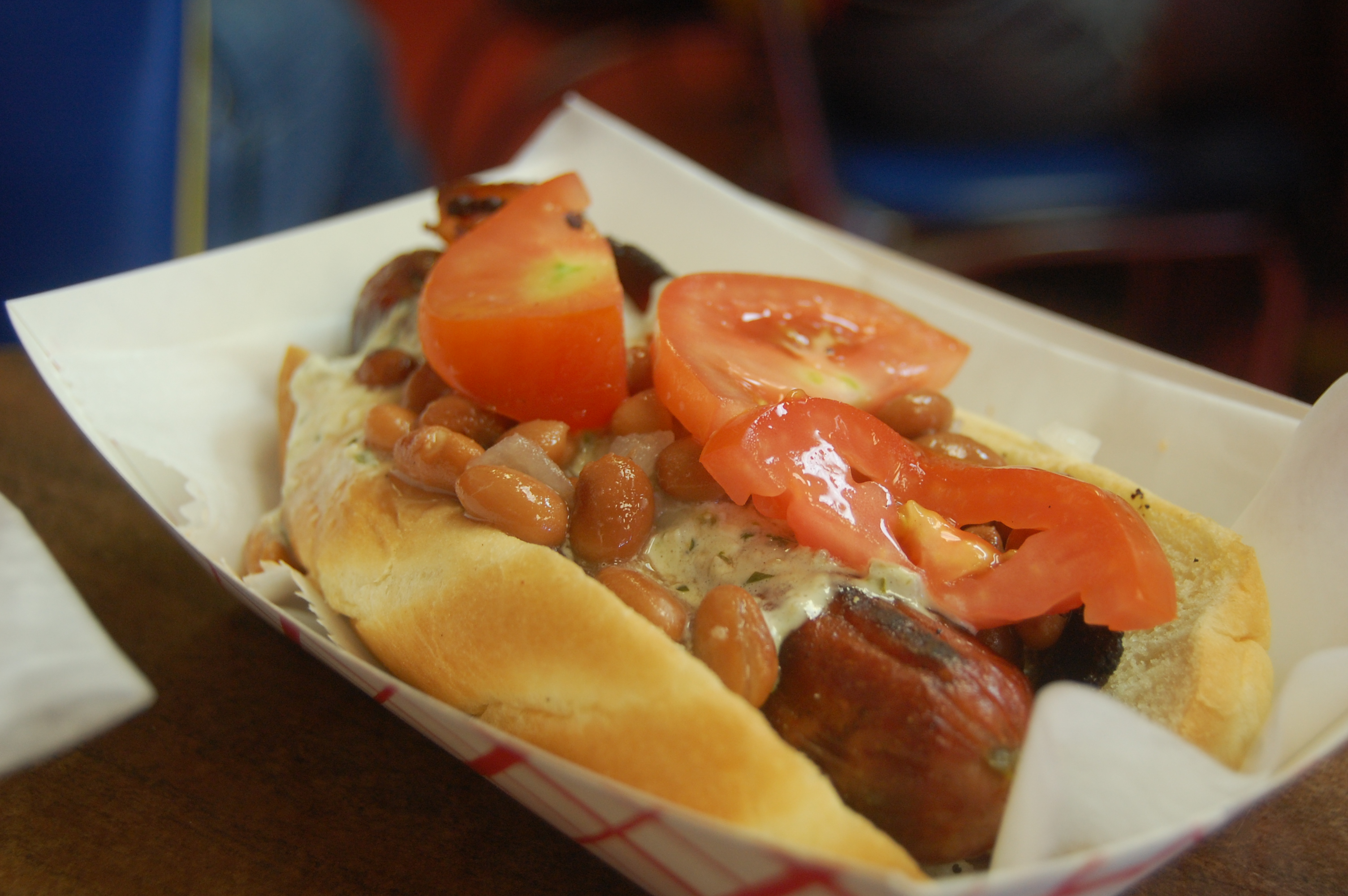
A Sonoran hot dog, a popular Mexican-style hot dog from Sonora, Mexico, typically topped with pinto beans, tomatoes, onions, and various sauces, wrapped in bacon and served in a soft bun.

The cuisine of Arizona is influenced by its location and proximity to Mexico and reflects a blend of Hispanic, Native American and pioneer culinary traditions. The O'odham peoples cultivated crops like maize and tepary beans around the Sonoran Desert area located at the base of the Tucson Mountains.

Local dishes include raspado, huevos rancheros and tamales. The Sonoran hot dog is an Arizona specialty served with pinto beans, guacamole, jalapeños, salsa and layered with other southwestern flavors.

Tucson, Arizona became the first American city to receive the designation of "City of Gastronomy" by UNESCO.

Restaurants use local ingredients, many grown with heirloom seeds distributed by non-profit organizations like Native Seeds/SEARCH. Salads and salsas are made with cholla cactus, gathered and dried at the San Xavier Indian Reservation.

=== California ===
Tri-tip steak cooked on the grill, served alongside a saucepan of baked beans and slices of toasted bread, a classic combination in American barbecue cuisine.

Santa Maria-style barbecue is a regional traditional cuisine rooted in the Santa Maria Valley in Santa Barbara County on the Central Coast of California. It originated during the mission era of California when local rancheros and vaqueros would host Spanish-style feasts during spring. They barbecued meat over earthen pits filled with hot coals of local coastal live oak. Meals are often accommodated with pinquitos, small pink beans that are considered endemic to the Santa Maria Valley.

=== Colorado ===
The traditional cuisine of Colorado is similar to the cuisine of New Mexico: being influenced by its ties to the colonial Spanish, Mexican, Native American and the American Chuckwagon. Emphasis on wild game such as Bison, Elk, Trout, and Rocky mountain oyster accompanied with local products such as Paliside peaches and Olathe sweet corn sets them apart from the cuisine of New Mexico. Furthermore, varietal differences between the heirloom crops of local Hispano populations in southern Colorado also exist, with the Garcia bolita beans (as opposed to the New Mexican bolita) and the New Mexico chile pepper from Hatch, New Mexico, as well as peppers from Pueblo, Colorado. Due to this there exists a friendly rivalry between Colorado and New Mexico over who grows the best chile. The Pueblo chili tends to accompany itself to traditional dishes like that of the Slopper and Coloradoan green chili.

=== Nevada ===
The indigenous cuisine of Nevada is mainly New Mexican as well as Utah influenced Mormon foodways, these remain popular with Nevadans. New Mexican restaurants have success in the state, take for example the Las Vegas Valley area with Carlito's Burritos and former Garduño's locations, like Carlito's Burritos offer New Mexico green chile roasts in early Autumn. This native food style is also greatly influenced by the myriad of buffets and global restaurants in the Las Vegas area, leading to a distinctive culinary scene. Las Vegas is known for its prime rib and especially seafood such as shrimp cocktails.

Other foods such as Basque cuisine also have a presence in the area, with many Basque restaurants in Las Vegas, and a Basque festival in Elko. There are some California influences, like the Picon Punch beverage not often found outside Nevada in modern times.

=== New Mexico ===
The most prevalent cuisine type of New Mexico is that of the cuisine originating in the historical region of Santa Fe de Nuevo México, with New Mexican cuisine continuing to be a blend of traditional foods of the Puebloans and Hispanos of New Mexico with modern American and Mexican influences.

=== Texas ===
Tex-Mex cuisine was first created from the early Tejano people in Texas as a mix of native Mexican and Spanish foods. This type of southwestern cuisine is heavy on cheese, beans, and meat. Dishes include heavy usage of the Chiltepin pepper. Popular dishes include enchiladas, fajita, menudo, and chili con carne.

=== Utah ===
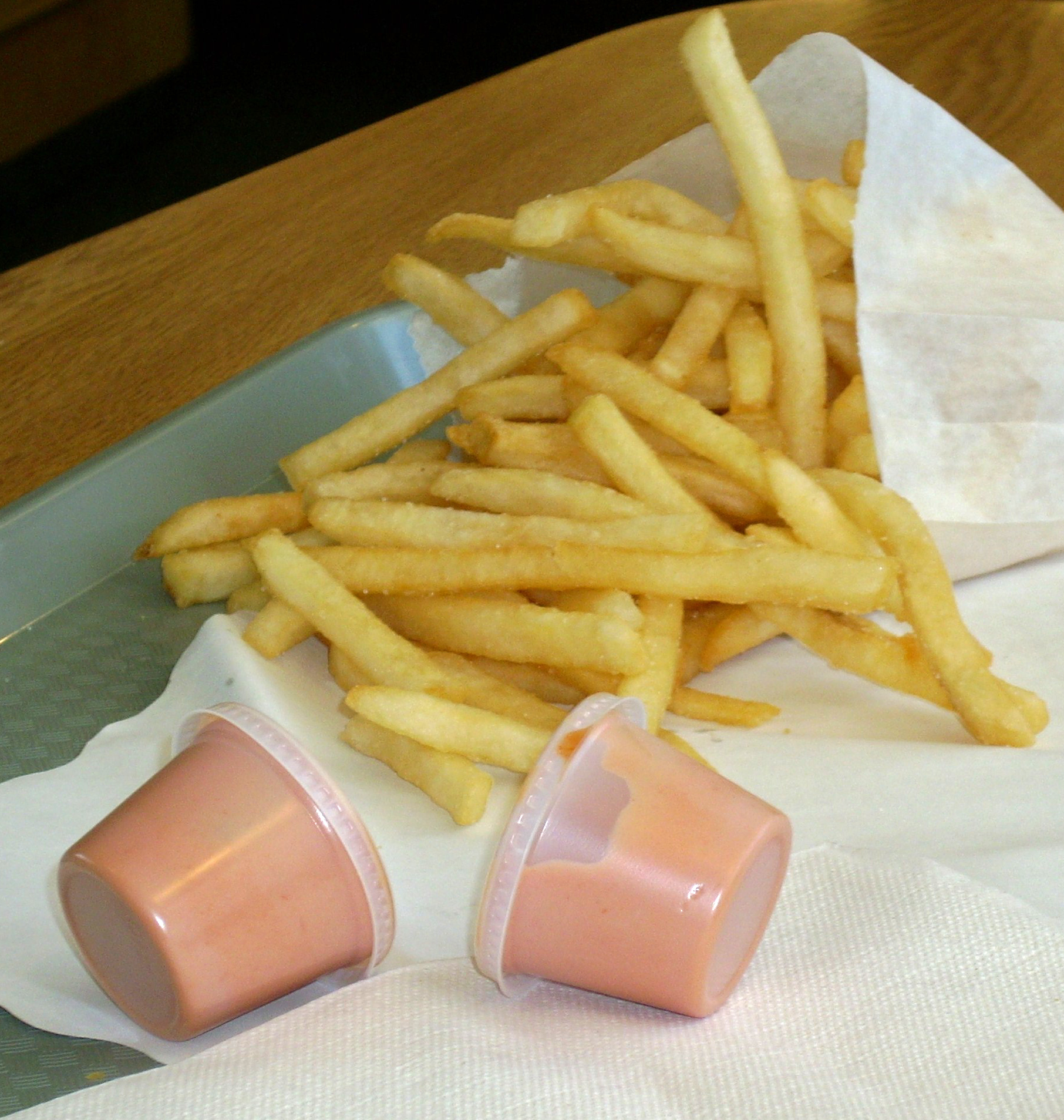
Fry sauce, a popular condiment in the United States, especially Utah, typically made by mixing mayonnaise and ketchup, served here with French fries.

Potatoes were the first crop planted by the pioneers when they arrived in the Salt Lake Valley in 1847 with seeds from the eastern states. According to William Clayton the first settlers in Utah also planted turnips, oats, corn, buckwheat and beans. Peach pits and apple seeds were planted at the insistence of Brigham Young.

Veterans of the Mexican–American War brought back seeds from California, introducing club wheat and the California pea to the state.

In modern times Utah is not noted for its culinary traditions except its fry sauce, a mix of ketchup and mayonnaise.

== Southwestern dishes ==
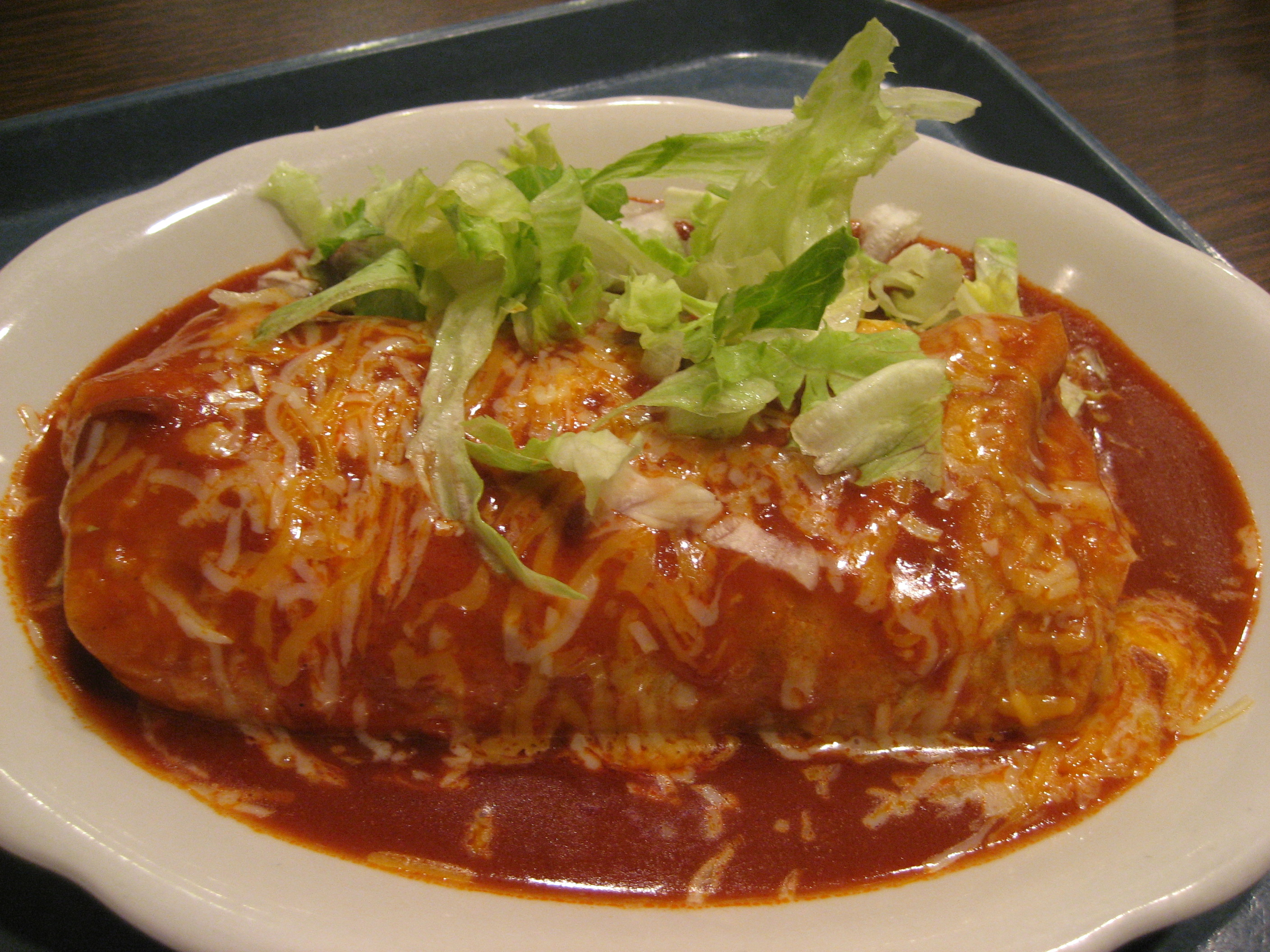
A burrito smothered in red chile sauce, commonly known as a "wet burrito," popular in Southwestern United States cuisine.

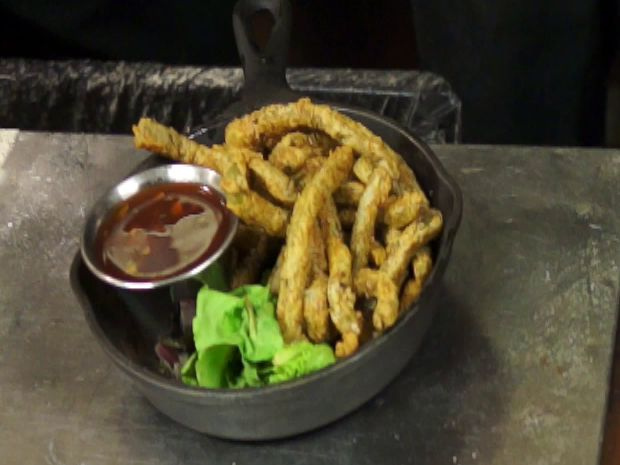
Cactus fries, battered and fried strips of nopales (prickly pear cactus pads), served with a side of prickly pear sauce.

- Albondigas de pollo
- California burrito
- Arizona cheese crisp
- Burrito
- Cactus fries
- Chili con carne
- Chili con queso
- Chile relleno
- Chimichanga
- Enchilada casserole
- Enchiladas
- Fajitas
- Flan
- Huevos rancheros
- Jalapeño poppers
- King Ranch chicken
- Menudo
- Nachos
- New Mexico breakfast burrito
- Pozole
- Quesadilla
- Rice and beans
- Salsa
- Slopper
- Sopapillas
- Tacos
- Tamale pie
- Taquitos
- Tostadas

== See also ==
- Elia Aboumrad
- Jackie Alpers, author of the Taste of Tucson cookbook
- Jane Butel, author on the subject
- Susan Feniger, author, television host and co-proprietor of the famed Border Grill
- Mary Sue Milliken, author, television host and co-proprietor of the famed Border Grill
- Stephan Pyles, author and restaurateur
- Aarón Sanchez
- Marcela Valladolid
- New Mexican cuisine
