= El Charro Café =

Restaurant in Arizona

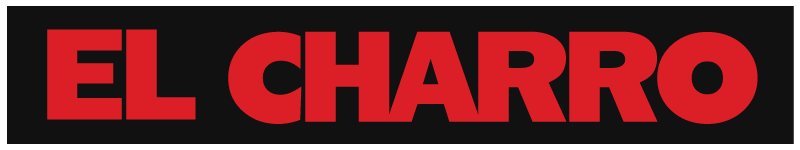

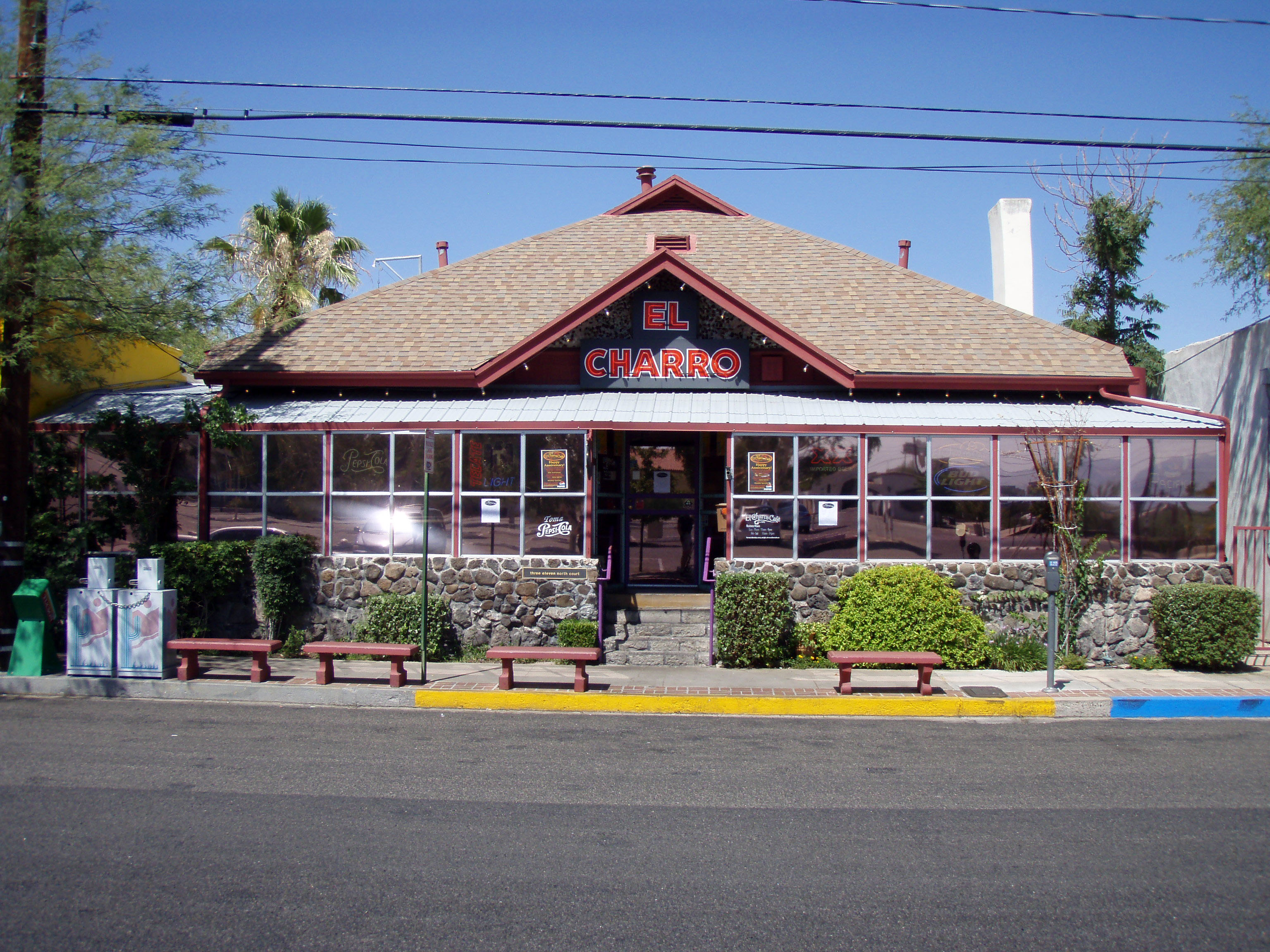
- The original restaurant in 2007

- Location within Arizona El Charro Café (the United States)

Restaurant information
- Established: 1922; 104 years ago
- Owner: Carlotta Flores
- Location: 311 N Court Ave, Tucson, AZ 85701
- Coordinates: 32.2257°N 110.9745°W
- Website: www.elcharrocafe.com

El Charro Café is a historic three-location Mexican restaurant based in Tucson, Arizona. It has been owned by the Flores family since its establishment in 1922, making it the oldest Mexican restaurant owned by the same family in the United States. It is also one of the oldest Mexican restaurants in the United States. A charro is a type of Mexican horseman.

== History ==
The restaurant was established in September 1922 by Monica Flin, one of Tucson's first businesswomen and the oldest of eight children. Her parents immigrated to Tucson from France in the 1880s, and Monica's father, Jules Flin, helped build the Cathedral of Saint Augustine in the city. Coming back from Mexico after her second husband died, Monica acted as the restaurant's hostess, waitress, and chef simultaneously to operate the one-room restaurant, with some financial assistance from her sister. In the first months the restaurant was open, Flin had to frequently persuade the neighbor, a Chinese grocer, for provisions, make the food, have the customer pay, and then pay the grocer back for the materials. The restaurant moved from its original Fourth Avenue location to the Temple of Art and Music, where the Arizona Theatre Company currently stands, and then moved to a more popular site on Broadway.

Flin is credited as a possible inventor of the chimichanga in the late 1940s or early 1950s, after accidentally dropping a burrito into a deep fryer. She nearly said a curse that began with "chi", but as there were children around, she quickly changed it to chimichanga, Spanish for thingamajig. In 1968, Flin relocated the restaurant to a house she inherited from her parents on Court Street, which is now a part of the El Presidio Historic District, as it had to make way for urban development projects like the Tucson Convention Center.

In 1972, Flin became very sick and appointed her sister, Zarina Dunn, and her brother-in-law to maintain the restaurant. They had just retired, however, and did not want to handle the restaurant. The couple's daughter (Monica's niece), Carlotta Flores, returned to Tucson from California a few years later to care for the restaurant. Flin died in 1975, from complications from multiple falls.

Flores was listed on the Forbes 50 Women Over 50 list in 2021. An episode of Top Chef: Houston was filmed at the restaurant in 2022.

== Menu ==
Menu items were inspired by Sonoran and Tucson-style Mexican food. This includes Arizona cheese crisps, quesadillas, chimichangas, queso flameado, shrimp ceviche, stuffed mushrooms, quesabirria, nachos, fajitas, enchiladas, tamales, (including ones made out of hemp) chile rellenos, tacos, burritos, and a burger. Soups include meatball soup, pozole, caldo de queso, and tortilla soup. Alcoholic drinks are also offered. As for desserts, the restaurant serves flan, fried ice cream, sopaipilla and churros with chocolate, tres leches cake, and Café de olla. The restaurant's signature dishes are its chimichangas and carne seca. The carne seca's beef is sun-dried in a cage on the downtown location's roof.

Many of the restaurant's menu items are sold on Goldbelly.
