= Cheese crisp (disambiguation) =

An Arizona cheese crisp is an open-faced, flour tortilla covered in shredded cheese.

Cheese crisp may also refer to:

- Frico, an Italian food known as a cheese crisp in English
- A cheese-flavoured potato chip (American English) or potato crisp (British English)

== See also ==
- Cheese puffs
