= Machacado con huevo =

Mexican dish made of shredded beef

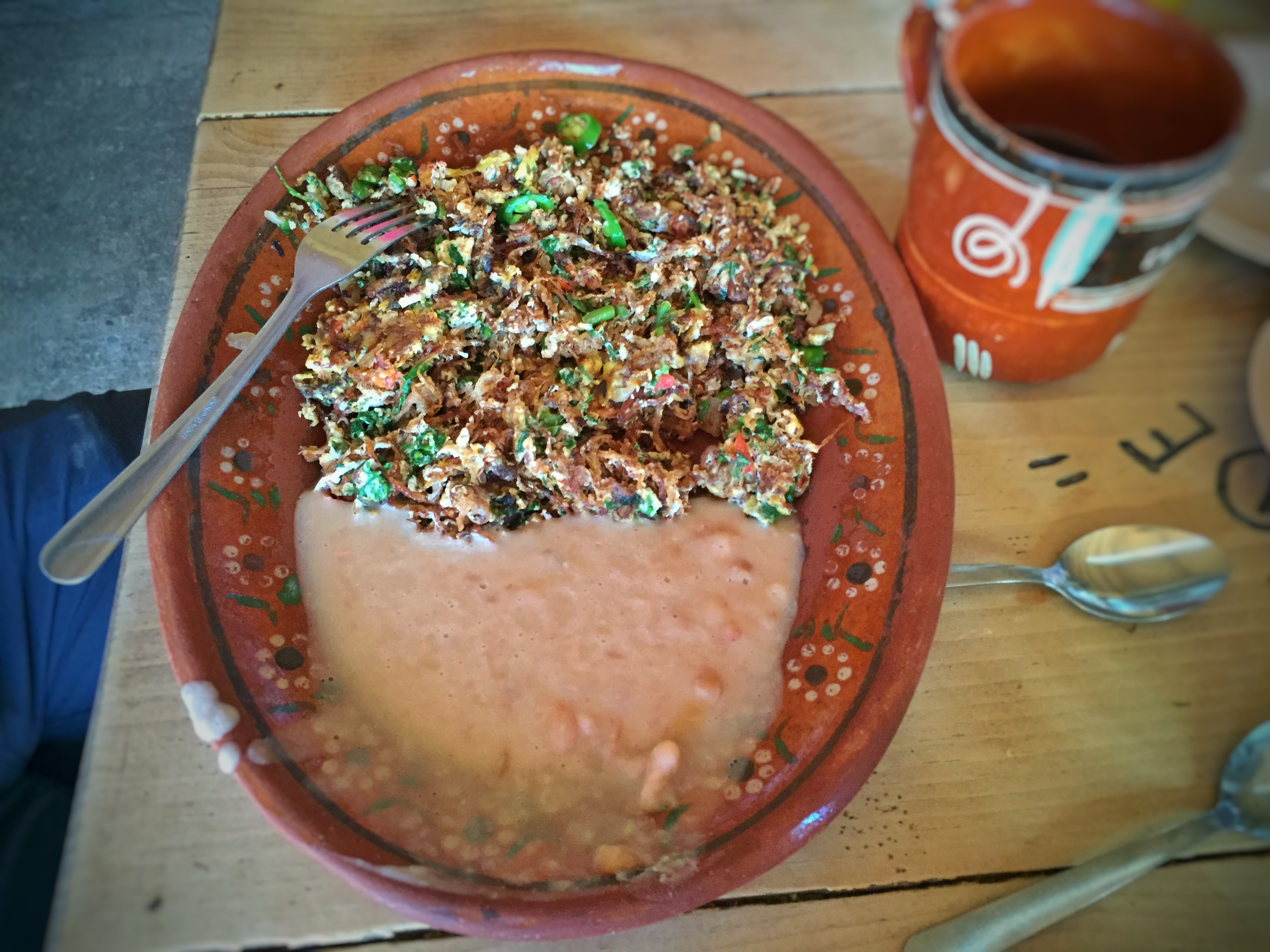
- The dish served with refried beans at La Cocina de Doña Esthela
- Alternative names: Machaca con huevo; Huevos con machaca
- Course: Breakfast
- Place of origin: Northern Mexico
- Region or state: Northern Mexico; Southwestern United States
- Main ingredients: Machaca, eggs, tomatoes, onions and jalapeños or serrano chili peppers
- Variations: Salsa

Machacado con huevo, machaca con huevo, or huevos con machaca is a dish consisting of shredded dry beef that is scrambled with eggs. Its name means "shredded with eggs" in Spanish. The shredded dry beef, carne seca or "machaca", is said to have originated in the town of Ciénega de Flores, about 20 miles north of Monterrey, Mexico. The early settlers in the area air-cured beef so that it would be preserved.

The basic machacado con huevo is made with eggs and dried beef. Chopped tomatoes, onions and jalapeños or serrano chili peppers can be added, or salsa can be cooked into it, to create another version. In Mexico, the dish is often eaten with flour tortillas, beans, and coffee. In the US, it is eaten as brunch or breakfast in Texas.

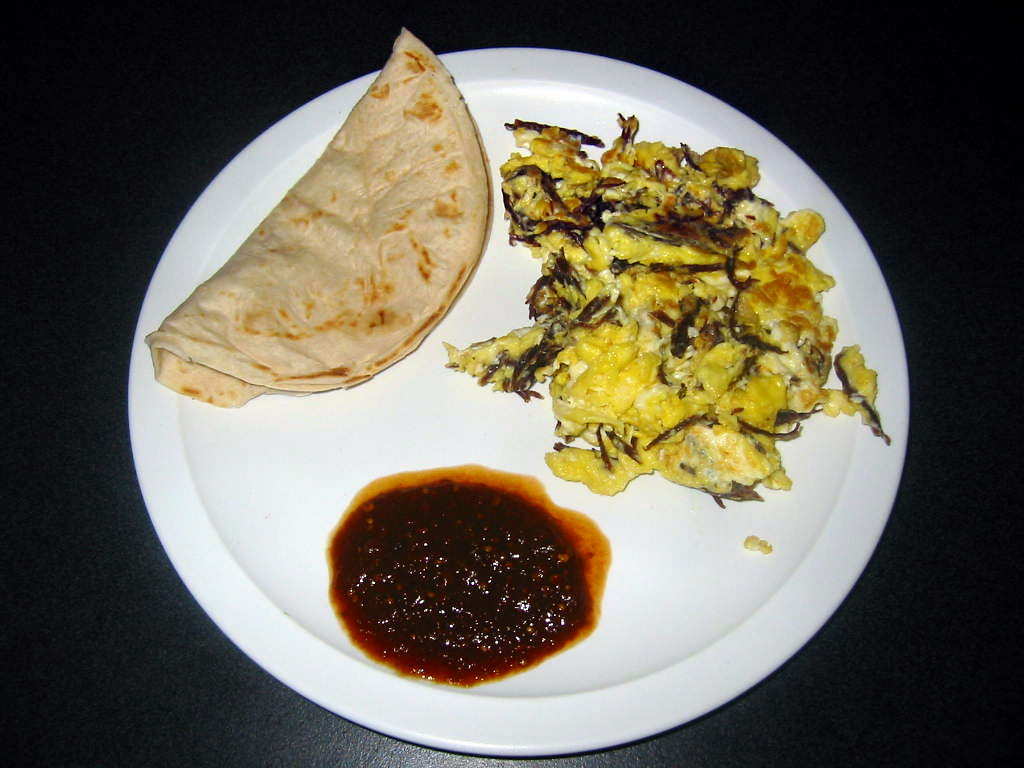
Machaca con huevo, hot sauce and wheat flour tortilla

== History ==
According to one legend, the dish was invented in the 1920s by restauranteur Fidencia Quiroga, who was known locally as "Tía Lencha" (Aunt Lencha). Although there is minimal evidence that the dish originated with her, she was responsible for its popularization after serving it to construction workers building the nearby Monterrey-Nuevo Laredo highway in 1928. As a result of her association with machacado con huevo, a major manufacturer of the shredded dried beef that is used in it—Productos Alimenticios Tia Lencha SA—is named after her.

== See also ==
- List of beef dishes
- List of egg dishes
