= Chimichanga =

Mexican and Southwestern American dish

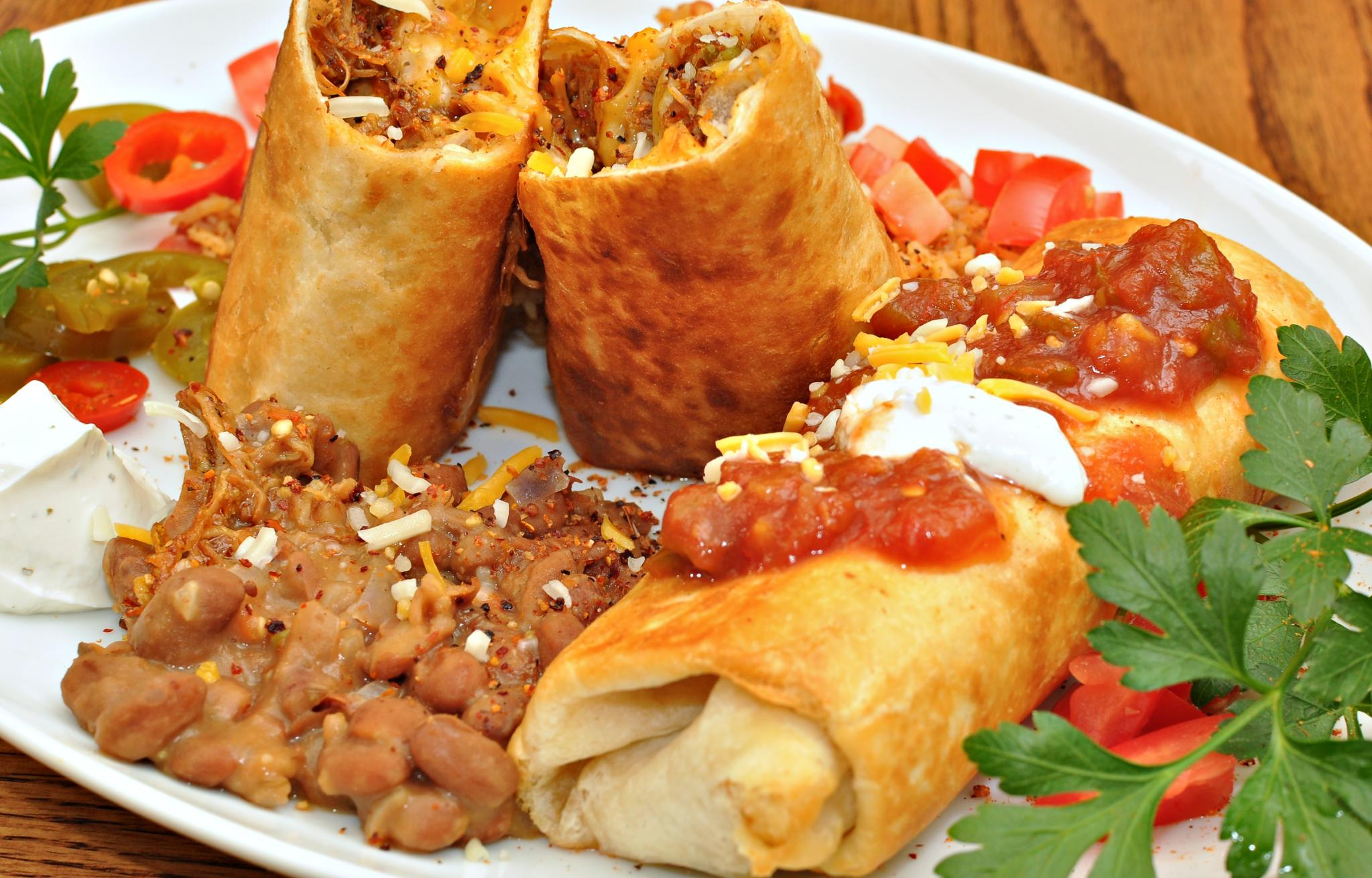
- Chimichangas
- Alternative names: Chivichanga
- Type: Burrito
- Place of origin: Southwestern United States or Mexico
- Main ingredients: Tortillas, rice, cheese, beans, machaca, jalapeño, carne adobada or shredded chicken

A chimichanga (Note: /ˌtʃɪmiˈtʃɑːŋɡə/, UK: /ˌtʃɪmɪˈtʃæŋɡə/; Spanish: [tʃimiˈtʃaŋɡa]) is a deep-fried burrito that is common in Southwestern U.S. cuisine. The dish is typically prepared by filling a flour tortilla with various ingredients, most commonly rice, cheese, beans, and a meat, such as machaca (chopped or shredded meat), carne adobada (marinated meat), carne seca (dried beef), or shredded chicken, and folding it into a rectangular package. It is then deep-fried, and can be accompanied by salsa, guacamole, or sour cream.

== Etymology ==
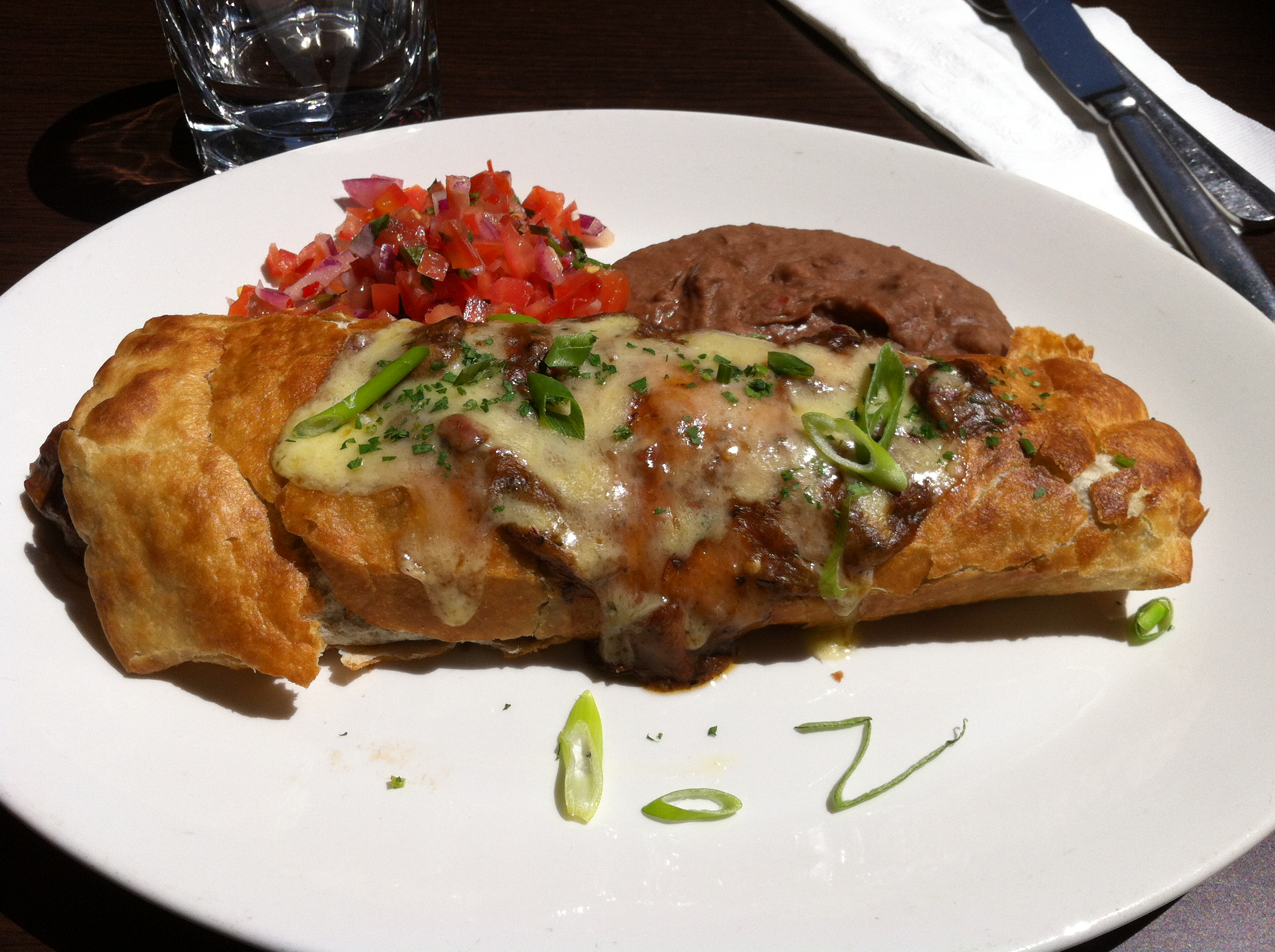
Chimichanga served in restaurant (Melbourne, Australia)

The origin of the term chimichanga is uncertain. According to Mexican linguist and philologist Francisco J. Santamaría's Diccionario de Mejicanismos (1959), Chivichanga is a regionalism from the State of Tabasco:

In Tabasco, it's any trinket or trifle; something unimportant and whose true role or origin, is not known legitimately. — Variants: chibachanga, chimichanga.

Chimichanga and its variants Chivichanga and Chibachanga are synonymous with the term Timbirimba, which means:

Term used in some parts of the interior of the country, to refer to a thing whose name is unknown, or a thing that is properly ignored. What timbirimba is that? Synonym of chivichanga.

== Folk history ==
From the Mexican term chivichanga, one account adduces that Sonoran immigrants brought the dish with them to Arizona. Instead, most researchers agree that the chimichanga was created by accident at a Mexican restaurant in Arizona, United States, although they disagree over precisely where. The words chimi and changa come from two Mexican Spanish terms: chamuscado (past participle of the verb chamuscar), which means seared or singed, and changa, related to chinga (third-person present tense form of the vulgar verb chingar), a rude expression for the unexpected or a small insult.

According to one source, Monica Flin, the founder of the Tucson, Arizona, restaurant El Charro Café (est. 1922), accidentally dropped a burrito into the deep-fat fryer in the early 1950s. She immediately began to utter a Spanish profanity beginning "chi..." (chingada), but quickly stopped herself and instead exclaimed chimichanga, a Spanish equivalent of "thingamajig". Knowledge and appreciation of the dish spread slowly outward from the Tucson area, with popularity elsewhere accelerating over the decades. Though the chimichanga is now found as part of the Tex-Mex cuisine, its roots within the U.S. are mainly in Tucson, Arizona.

Woody Johnson, founder of Mexican restaurant chain Macayo's Mexican Kitchen, said he had invented the chimichanga in 1946 when he put some burritos into a deep fryer as an experiment at his original restaurant Woody's El Nido, in Phoenix, Arizona. These "fried burritos" became so popular that by 1952, when Woody's El Nido became Macayo's, the chimichanga was one of the restaurant's main menu items. Although no official records indicate when the dish first appeared, retired University of Arizona folklorist Jim Griffith recalls seeing chimichangas at the Yaqui Old Pascua Village in Tucson in the mid-1950s.

== Nutritional value ==
According to data presented by the United States Department of Agriculture, a typical 180-gram (6.5-ounce) serving of a beef and cheese chimichanga contains 443 calories, 20 grams protein, 39 grams carbohydrates, 23 grams total fat, 11 grams saturated fat, 51 milligrams cholesterol, and 957 milligrams of sodium.

== See also ==
- List of tortilla-based dishes
