= Cactus fries =

Southwestern United States side dish

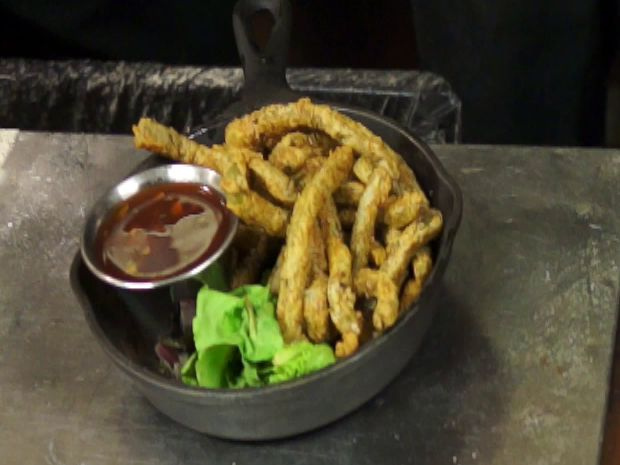
Cactus fries with a side of prickly pear sauce

Cactus fries or nopalitos fritos is a side dish originating in the Southwestern United States, made of battered and deep-fried prickly pear paddles or nopales.

== History ==
Cactus fries are an Americanized dish that uses traditional Mexican ingredients. The dish is strongly associated with the cuisine of the Southwestern United States, where prickly pear is commonly eaten, and particularly in Texas and New Mexico, where Tex-Mex and New Mexican cuisine has developed.

== Preparation ==
Cactus fries are prepared from nopales, the young segments or "paddles" of the prickly pear cactus. Before consumption, the needles and "eyes" are removed from the nopales, typically by scrubbing and rinsing them off, cutting them out or burning them. Store-bought nopales typically have most of their needles removed prior to sale. The segments are then sliced and dredged in a cornmeal and egg-white batter that has been seasoned with achiote paste before deep frying. Other variations use cactus that has been coated in seasoned breadcrumbs or cracker crumbs.

The cactus is coated with mucilage that gives it a slimy texture when cooked. This makes it easier for batter to stick to the cactus, although the texture is considered unpleasant by some. Some recipes call for marinating or boiling the prickly pear segments before battering.

Cactus fries have a crunchy exterior and a silky interior, which has been compared to that of fried okra and onion rings. The flavor of the cactus itself has been compared to asparagus or bell peppers. They are frequently served with a dipping sauce, such as salsa, ranch dressing, or spicy ketchup.

Prickly pears, or nopales
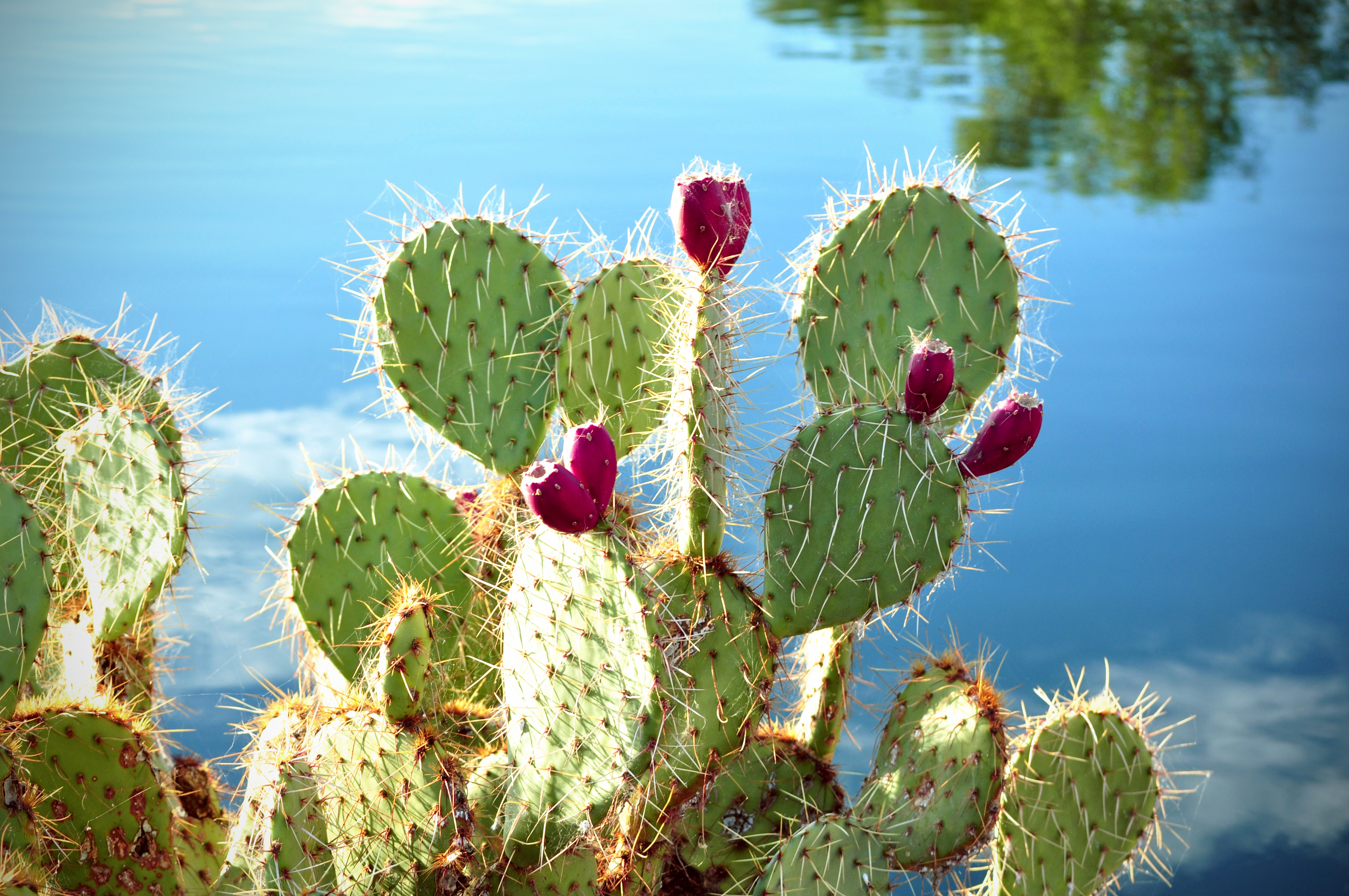
Prickly pear cactus

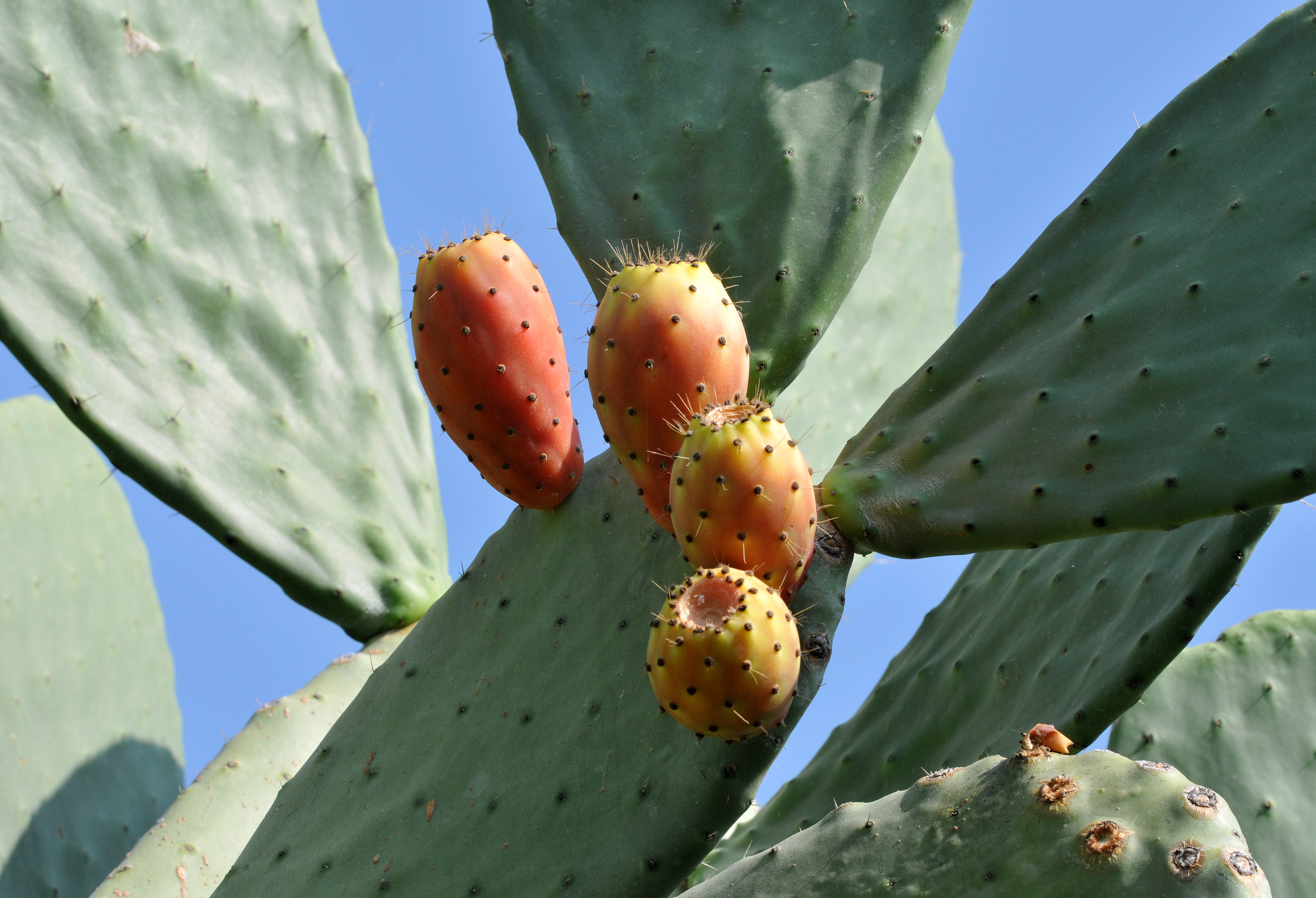
Prickly pear fruit

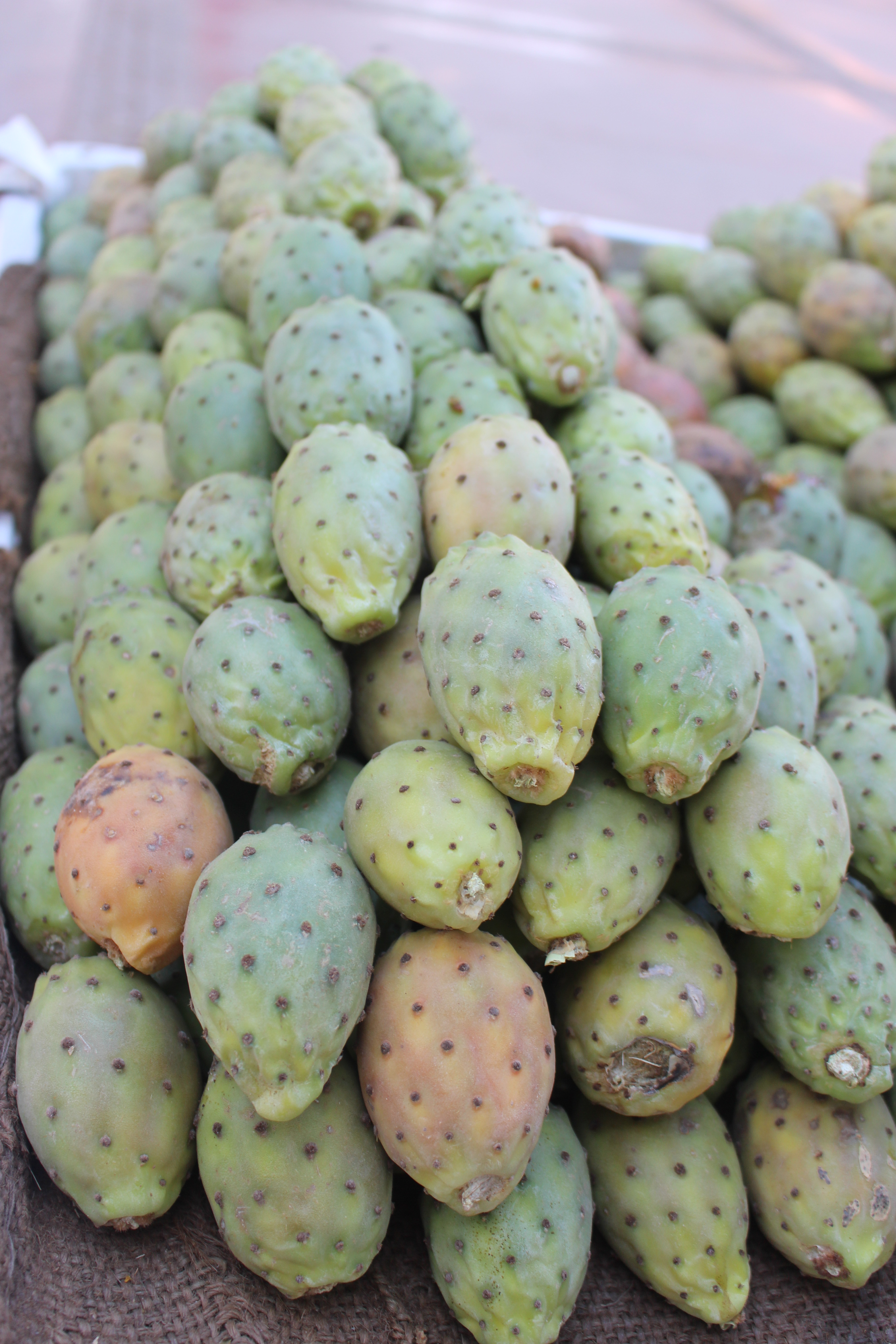
Gathered prickly pears

== See also ==
- Fried cassava
- French fries
- Fried sweet potato
