= Crinkle-cutting =

Technique of cutting vegetables

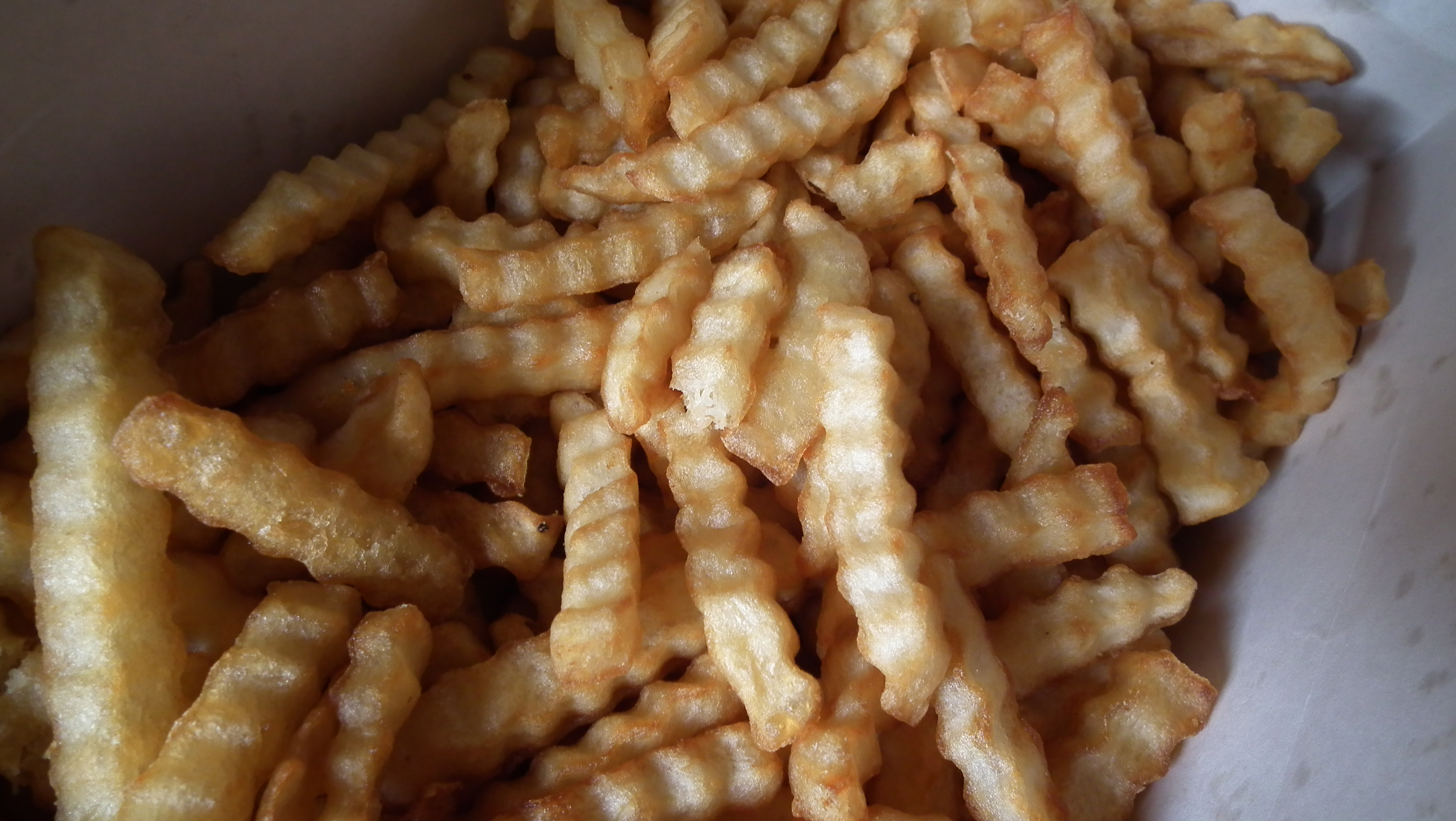
Crinkle-cut French fries

Crinkle-cutting is slicing that leaves a corrugated surface. It can be done to enhance the texture or mechanical properties of food. Crinkle-cutting French fries makes them absorb more cooking oil and increases their ability to retain dipping sauce.

== Gallery ==
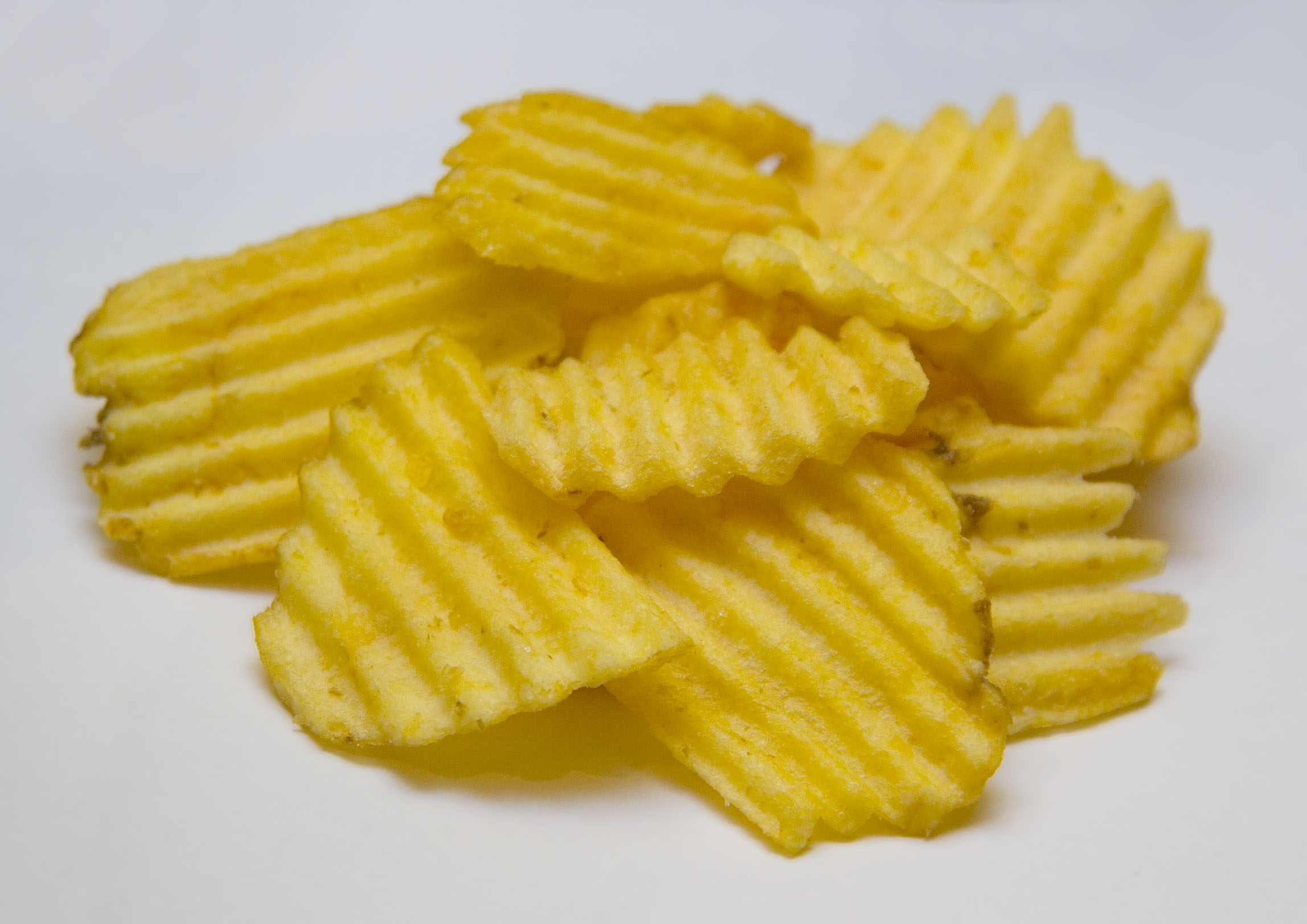
Ruffled potato chips

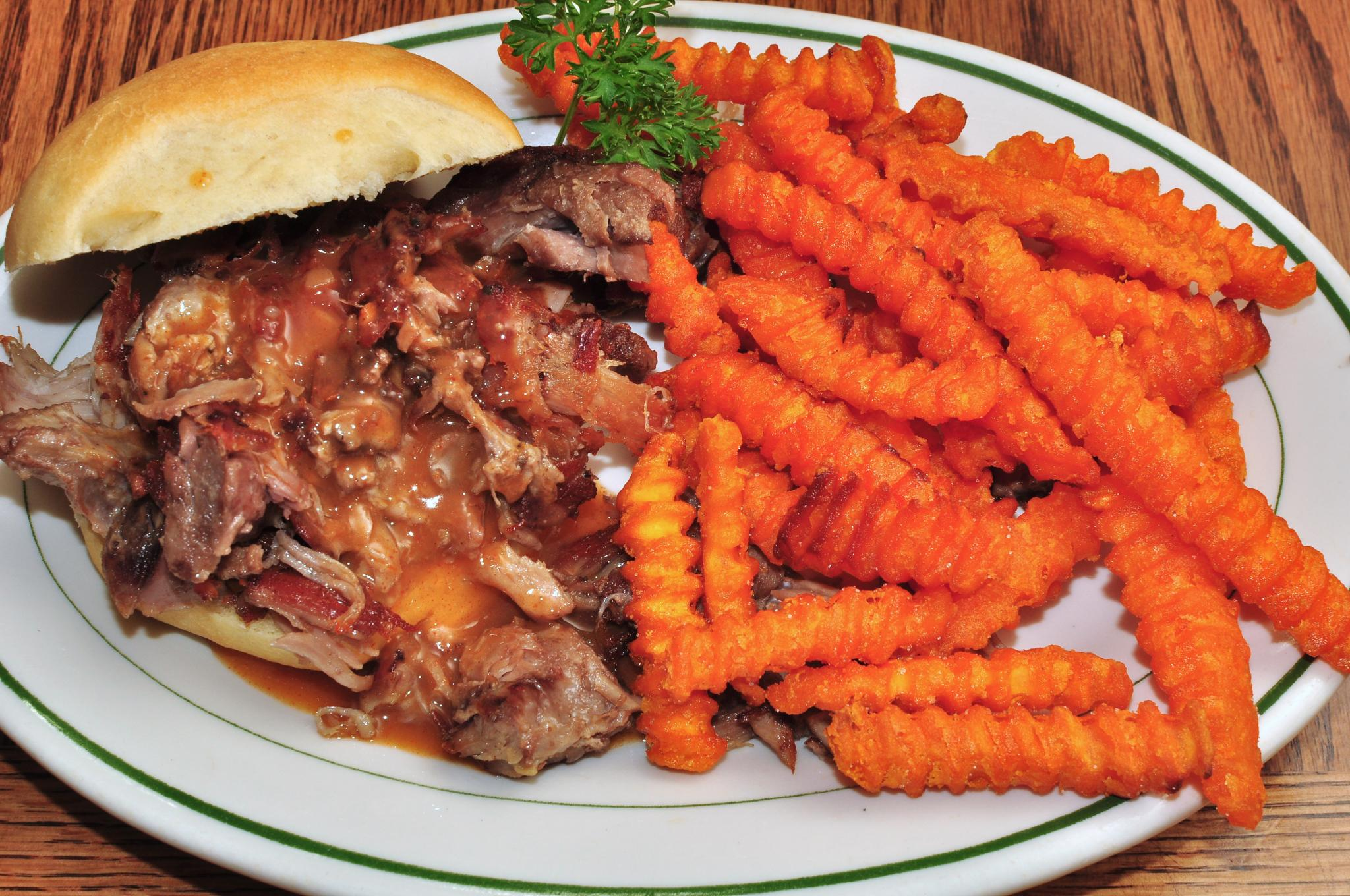
Sweet potato fries or "wavy fries"
