= Fried sweet potato =

Dishes including sweet potato fries

Fried sweet potato features in a variety of dishes and cuisines. The ingredient sweet potato, combined with the cooking technique of frying, has a sweet flavour and fried texture.

== Examples ==
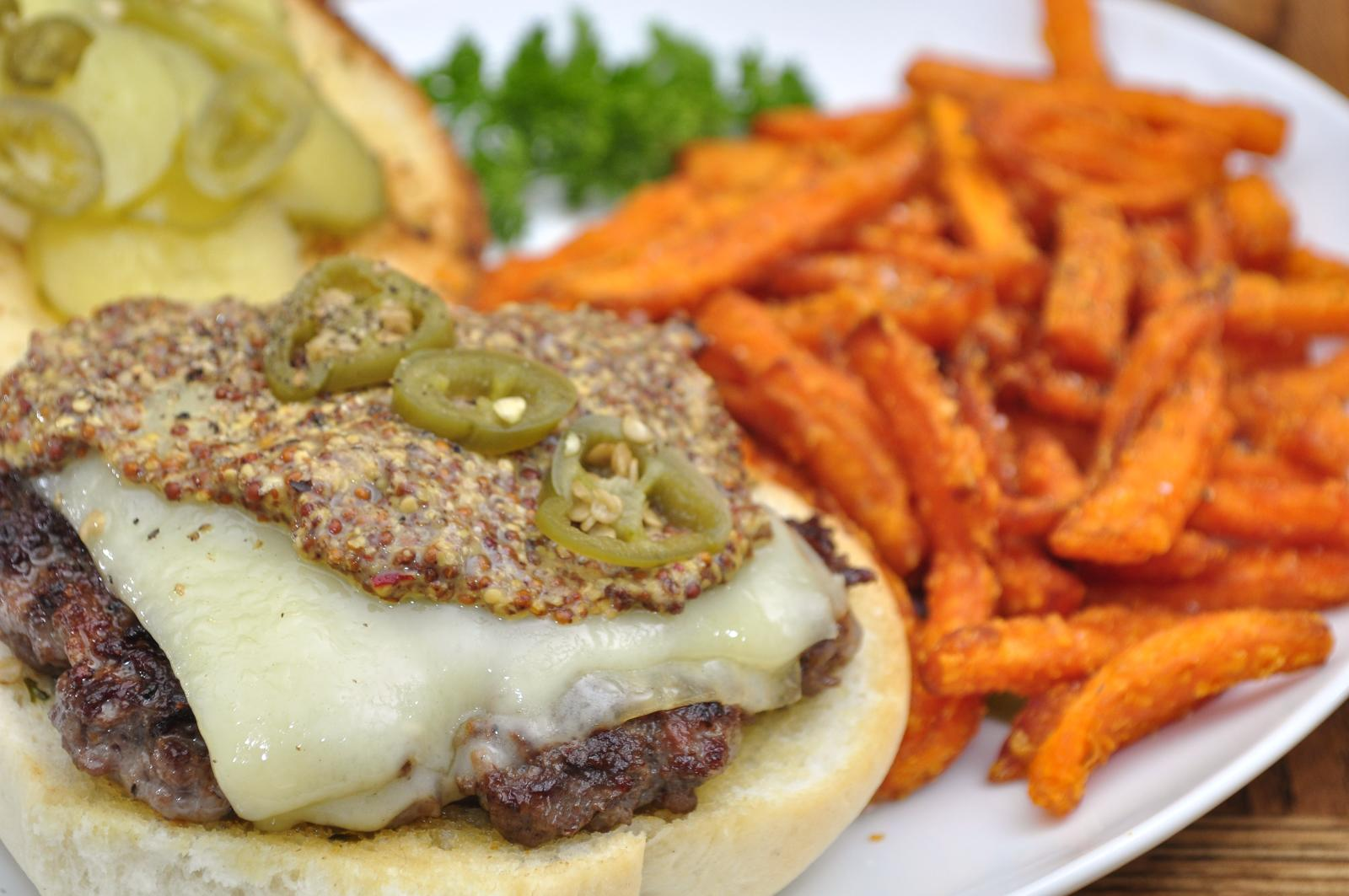
A cheeseburger and sweet potato fries

The popular sweet potato fries are a variation of French fries using sweet potato instead of potato. Recipes for fried sweet potatoes in the United States go back to the nineteenth century. Some suggest parboiling the sweet potatoes before frying, while others call for frying them with sugar. In New Zealand, they are known as kūmara fries using the Māori word for sweet potato. In the Philippines, they are known as kamote fries also spelled as camote fries using the Filipino word for sweet potato and it is popularized by Max's Restaurant.

Fried sweet potatoes are known as patates in Guinean cuisine, where they are more popular than potatoes and more commonly used to make fries.

Goguma-twigim is a fried sweet potato dish in Korean cuisine. Kananga phodi-tawa is a dish of lightly battered and fried sweet potato in Indian cuisine.

== Nutrition ==
In comparison to french fries made using potatoes, both contain similar levels of macro-nutrients, calories, carbohydrates, fiber, and fat (before cooking). Sweet potato fries are higher in fiber, calcium, and vitamin A, while potato fries contain more iron, potassium, and vitamin C. When deep fried, both will contain very similar levels of fat. If baked, the sweet potato "fries" will have less fat.

== Gallery ==
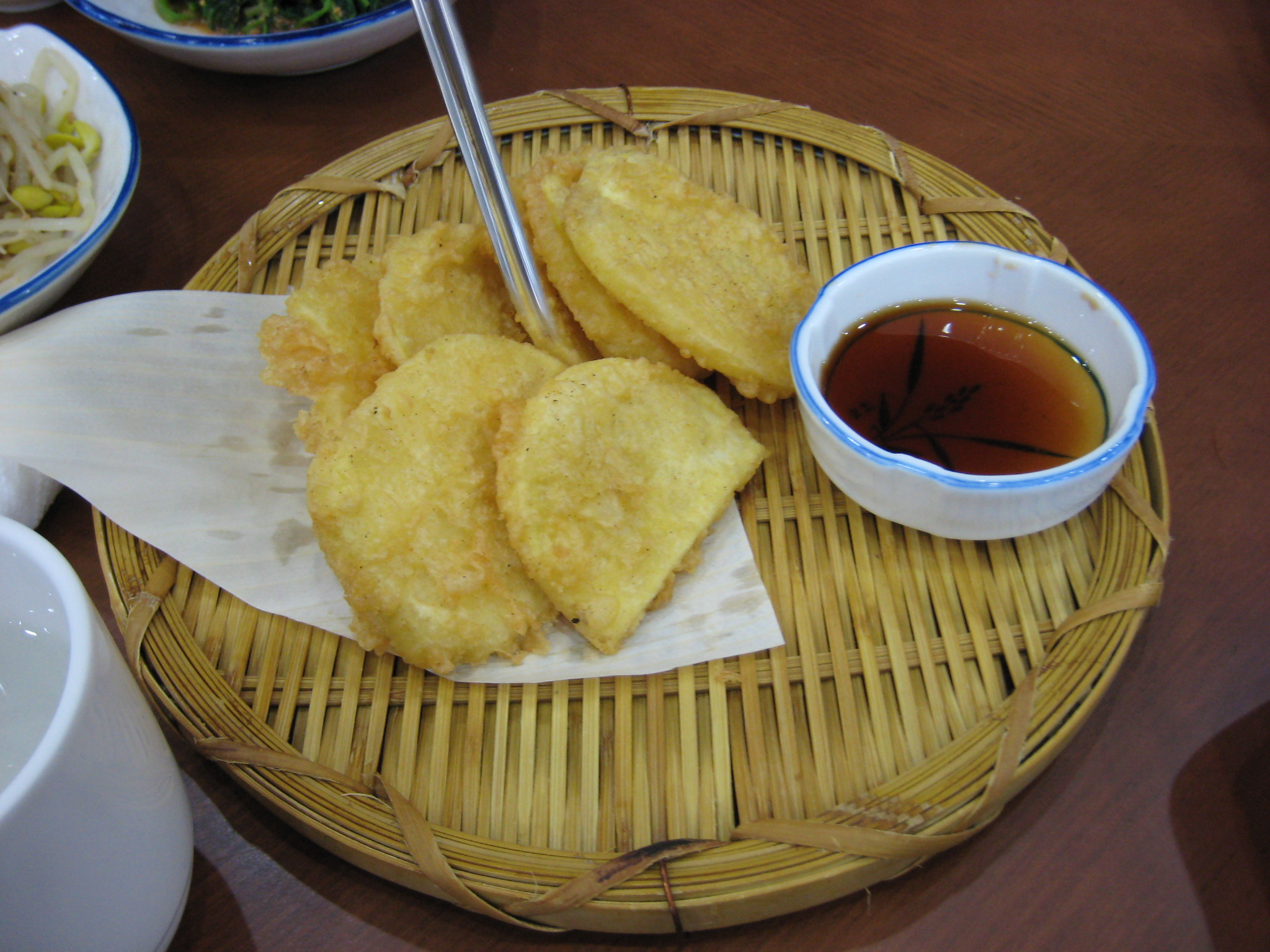
Goguma-twigim, a fried sweet potato dish in Korean cuisine

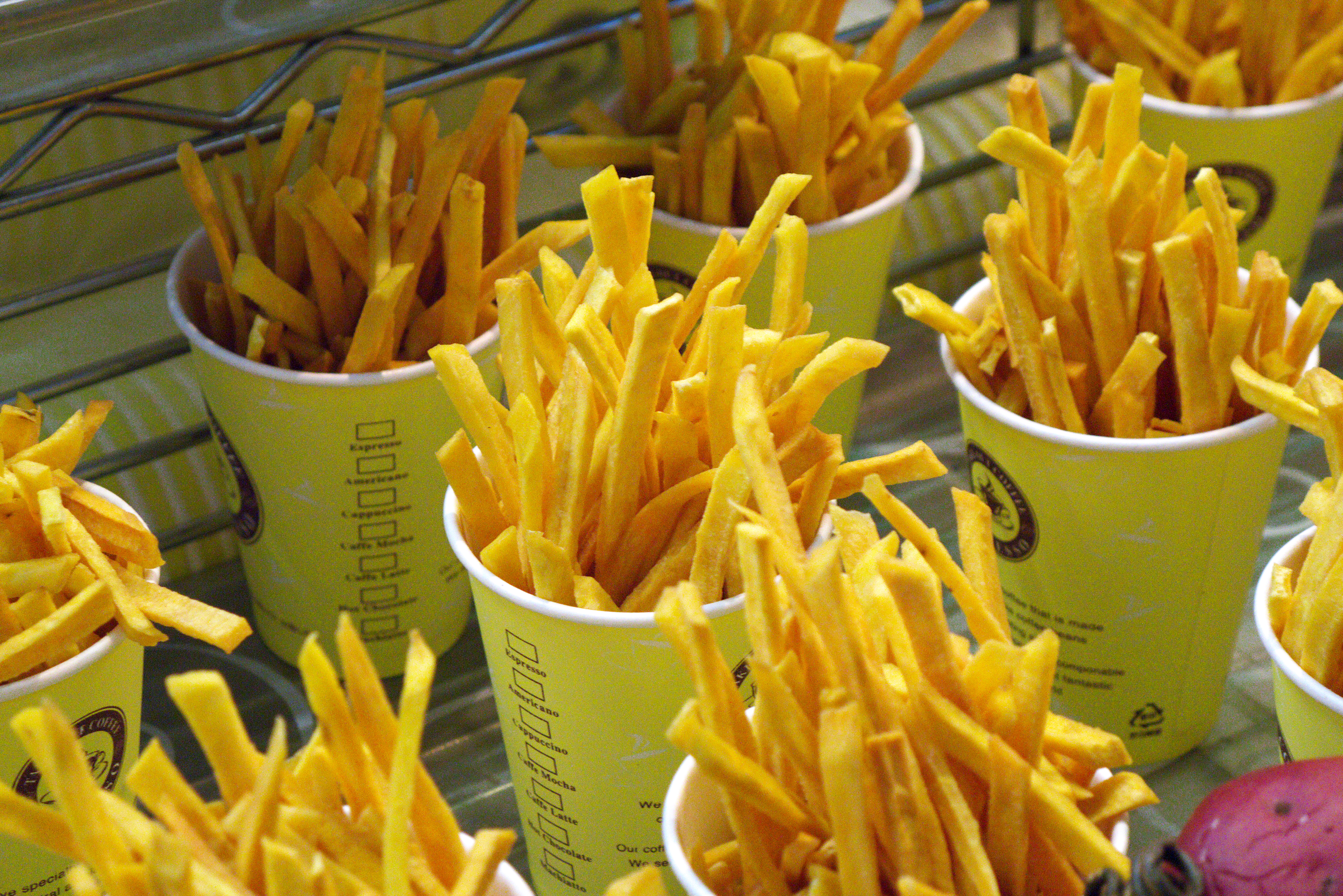
Goguma-stick (sweet potato fries) sold as street food in Seoul

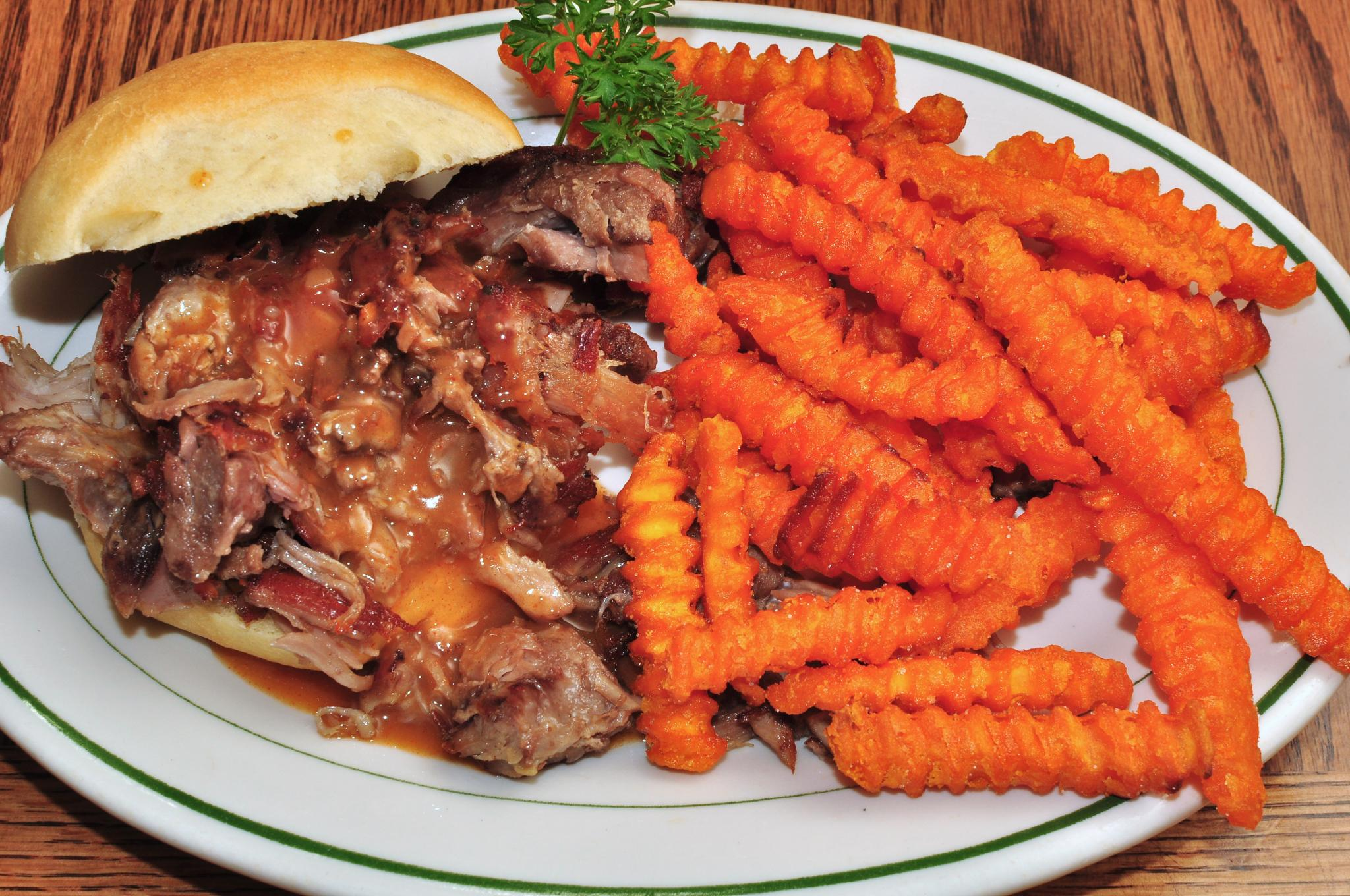
Crinkle-cut sweet potato fries as a side dish

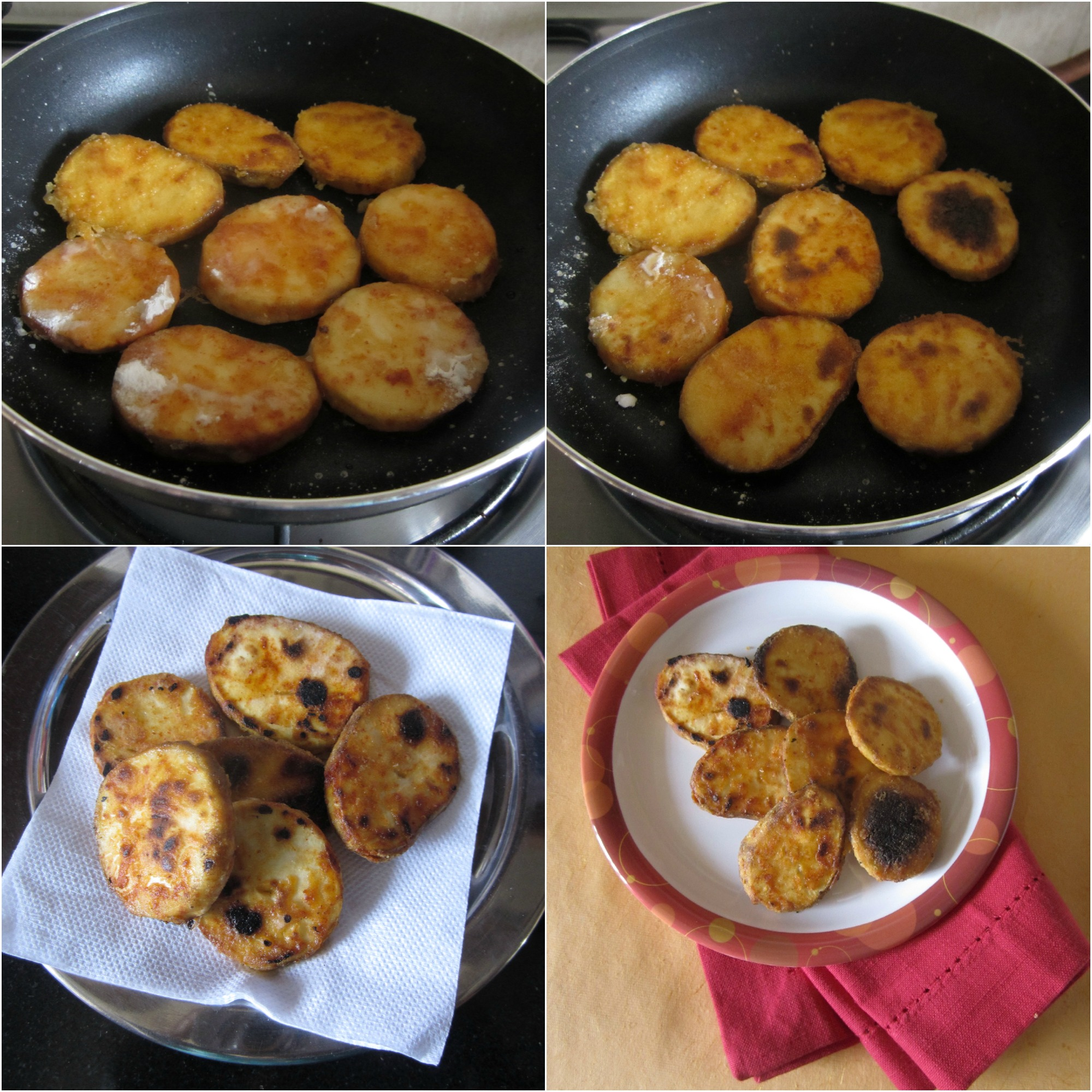
Kananga phodi-tawa, an Indian dish made with battered and fried sweet potato

== See also ==
- Cactus fries
- List of sweet potato dishes
- Sweet potato pie
- Sweet potato soup
- Vegetable tempura
