= Machaca =

Mexican dried meat

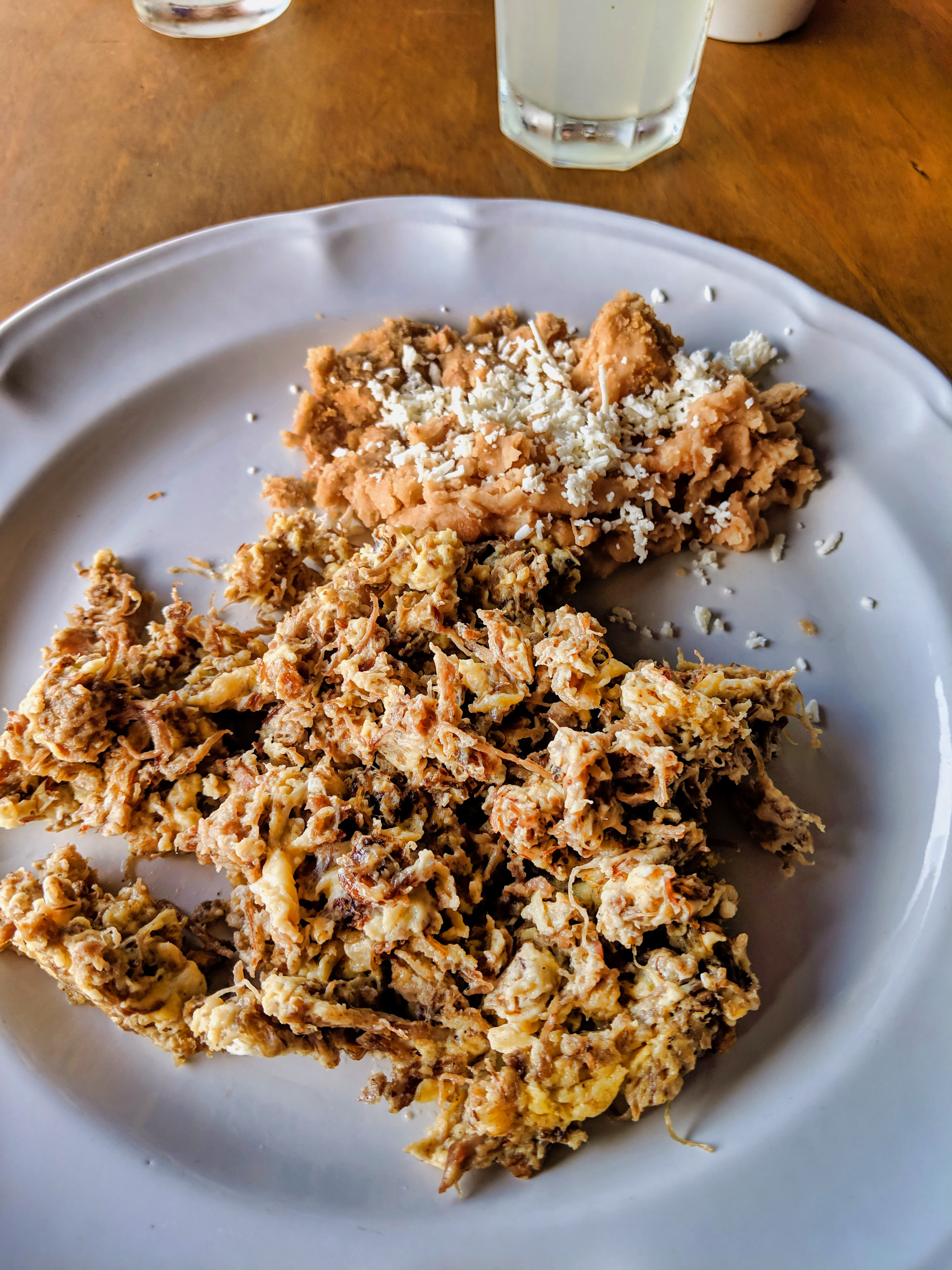
- Machaca
- Type: Dried meat
- Place of origin: Mexico
- Region or state: Northern Mexico
- Main ingredients: Beef or pork
- Ingredients generally used: Chilis and other spices

Machaca (Spanish: [maˈtʃaka]) is a traditionally dried meat, usually spiced beef or pork, that is rehydrated and then used in popular local cuisine in Northern Mexico and the Southwestern United States. It is also readily available in many groceries and supermarkets in these areas. In areas where the dried meat product is not easy to obtain, slow-cooked roast beef (brisket) or skirt steak shredded and then fried is sometimes substituted.

The dish is known primarily in the north of Mexico, and the southern regions of the U.S. states of Arizona, California, and New Mexico, and in Texas where it is known as machacado. In central and southern Mexico, it is not well known by lower socioeconomic classes.

== History ==
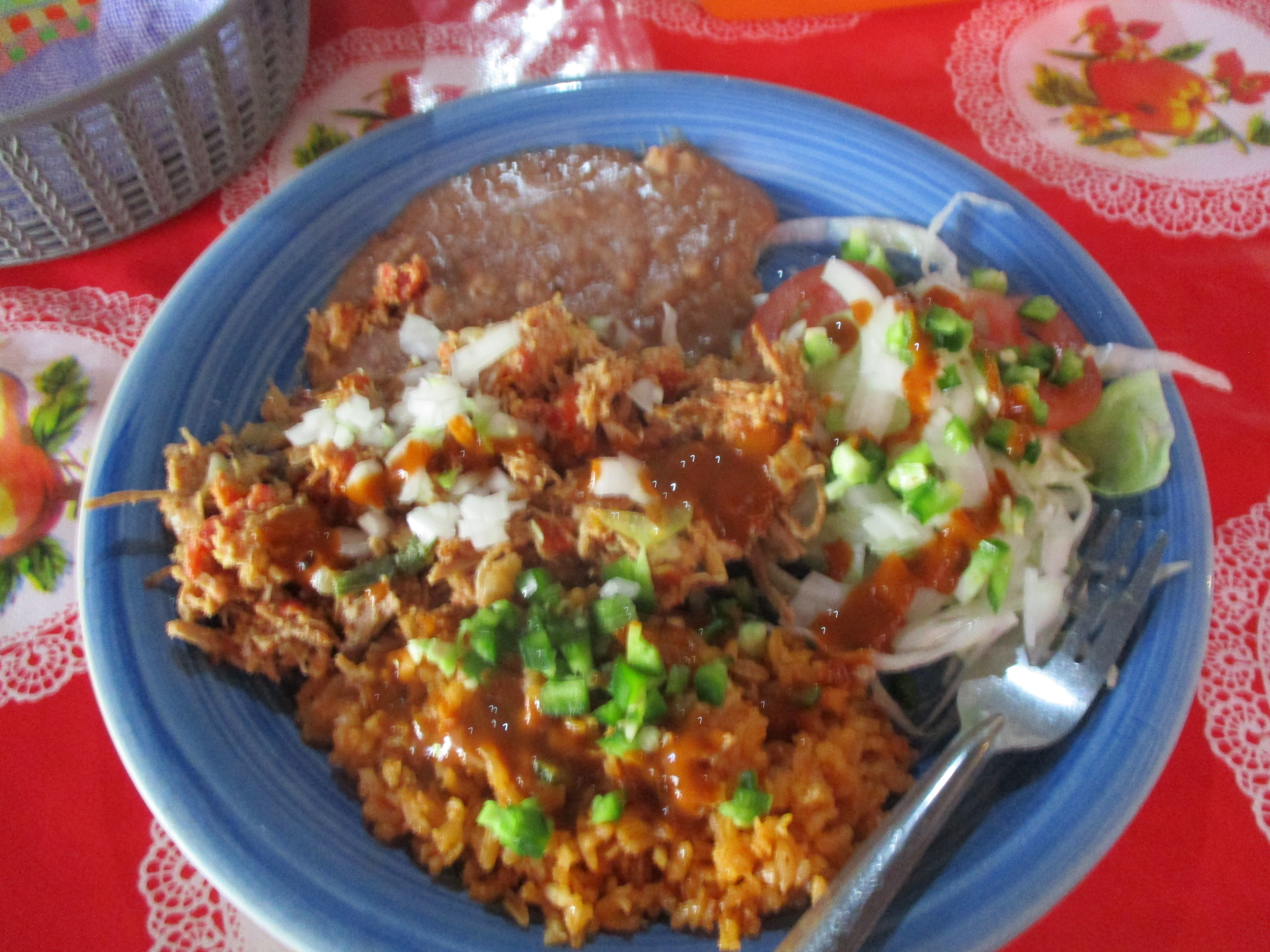
Machaca served in Puerto Vallarta

Machaca was originally prepared most commonly from dried, spiced beef or pork, and then rehydrated and pounded to make it tender. The reconstituted meat would then be used to prepare any number of dishes. While drying meat is one of the oldest forms of preservation, the drying of beef with chilis and other native spices was developed by the ranchers and cowboys of northern Mexico.

After the arrival of refrigeration, dehydration was no longer needed for preservation. Most dried beef is sold in the United States as jerky. In Mexico, it is still sold for cooking and snacking; this is done primarily in the north and in small-scale operations. Most machaca dishes now are made from beef that has been well-cooked, shredded, and then cooked in its juices until the desired consistency is achieved, which can be soupy, dry, or medio. In Tucson, Arizona, and southward, the preparation is almost always dry, and approximates more closely the taste and texture of the original dish prepared from dried meat. Carne seca is an alternative name for machaca in parts of the Southwest and Sonora, Mexico.

== Serving ==
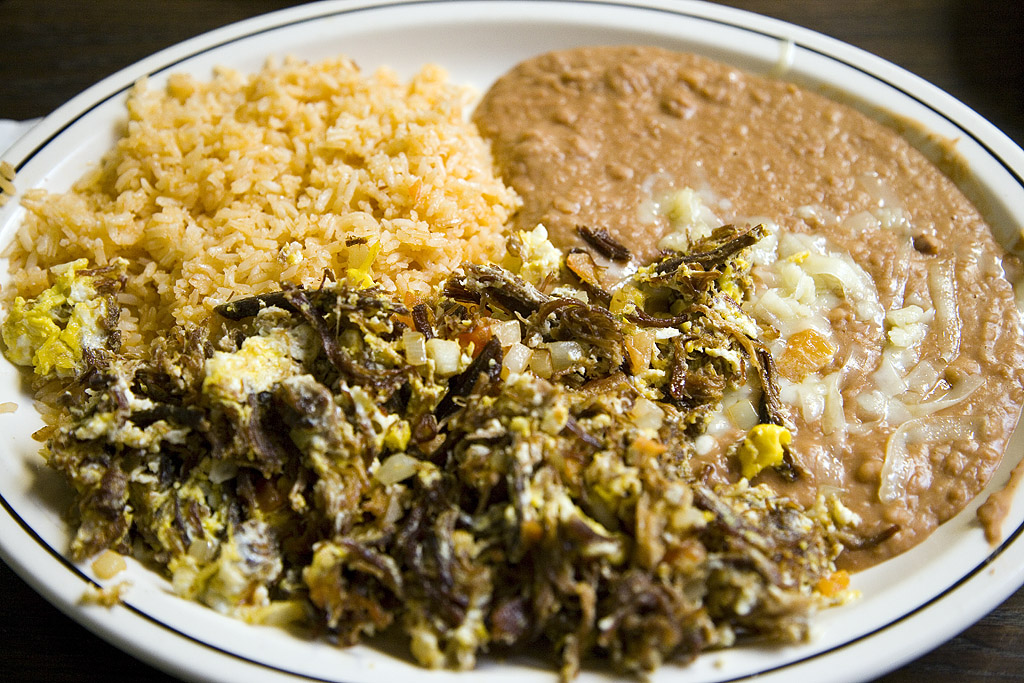
Machacado con huevo, served with beans and rice

Prepared machaca can be served any number of ways, such as tightly rolled flautas, tacos, or burritos, or on a plate with eggs, onions and peppers (chiles verdes or chiles poblanos). Machaca is almost always served with flour tortillas that tend to be large, up to 20 inches in diameter. A very popular breakfast or brunch dish is machaca with eggs, associated with miners in the state of Chihuahua.

== See also ==
- List of dried foods
- List of Mexican dishes
- Rousong
