= Slopper =

Colorado burger dish

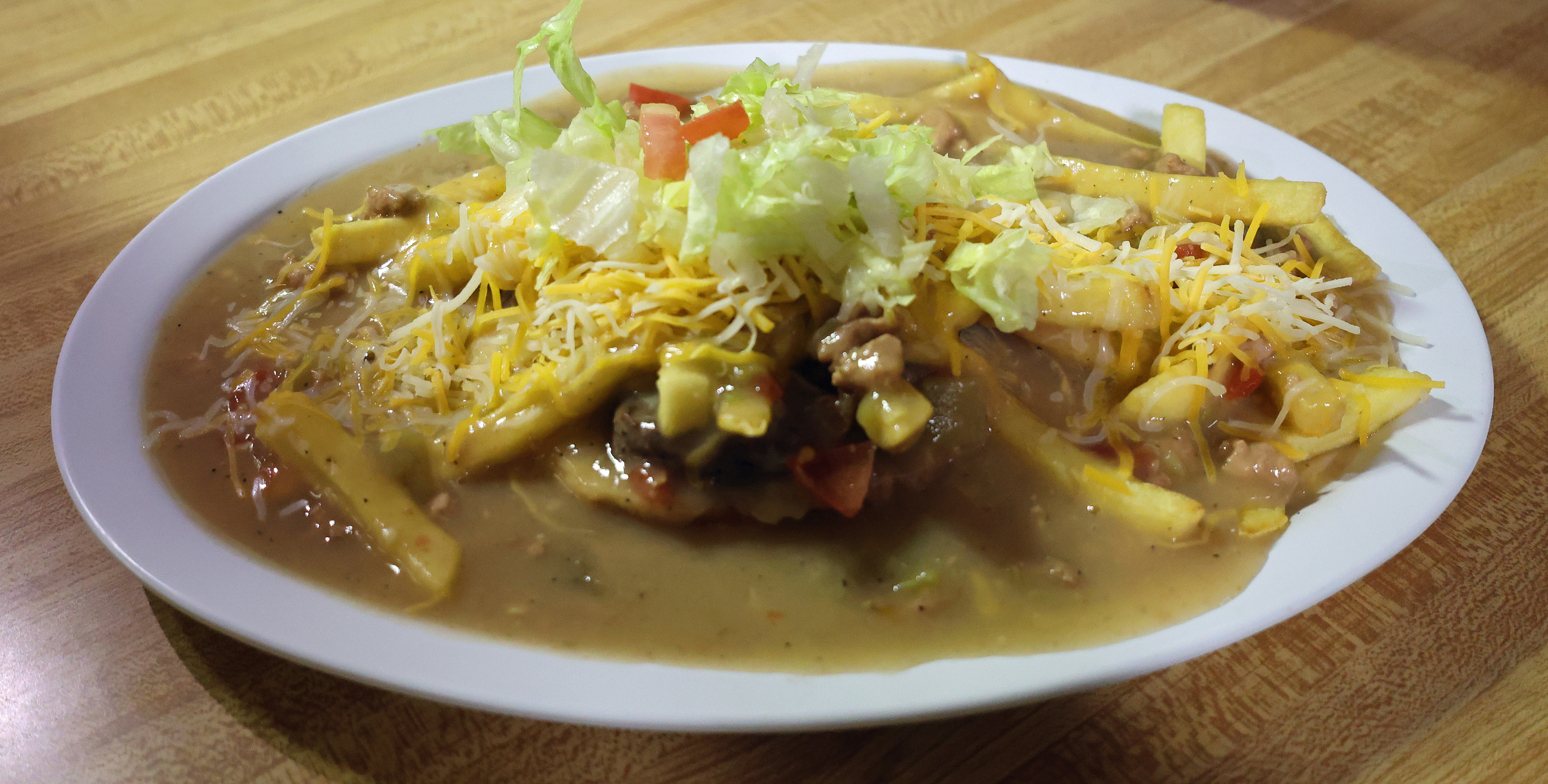
A slopper with fries

A slopper is a cheeseburger (or hamburger) served smothered in red chile or green chile or chili sauce. Sloppers generally include grilled buns and are often topped with freshly chopped onions and sometimes french fries. They are typically eaten with a fork and a knife or spoon. The slopper is served in restaurants and taverns in the Pueblo and Colorado Springs area of Colorado. Versions of the slopper are also served throughout the rest of Colorado and parts of the United States.

== History ==
One writer determined that the slopper originated in Pueblo, Colorado in the early to mid-1970s. The first restaurant to serve the slopper is undetermined. Some claim that it was first served in Coors Tavern, while others insist that it originated at Star Bar. According to a version of the origin story by Gray's Coors Tavern's, the slopper originated there in the 1950s. The website attributes the creation of the slopper to brothers Johnnie and Joe Greco, who had previously owned the tavern.

The Coors dish has various backstories. One says that the name slopper was derived from a comment by a customer stating that the dish looked like slop. Others attribute the origin of the dish to the late Herb Casebeer, owner of Herb's Sports shop, who was a regular patron in the late 1950s to early 1960s. One story says that Casebeer would order a burger with chile from the Grecos and ask them to "just slop it all up". Juan Espinosa, a former editor of the Pueblo Chieftain, attributes the dish's origin to Casebeer being dissatisfied with the amount of chili on his chiliburger, and the Grecos responding by covering it in chili (probably in an exaggerated and exasperated maneuver), only for it to become a popular new serving suggestion.

== See also ==
- List of hamburgers
