= Basque festival =

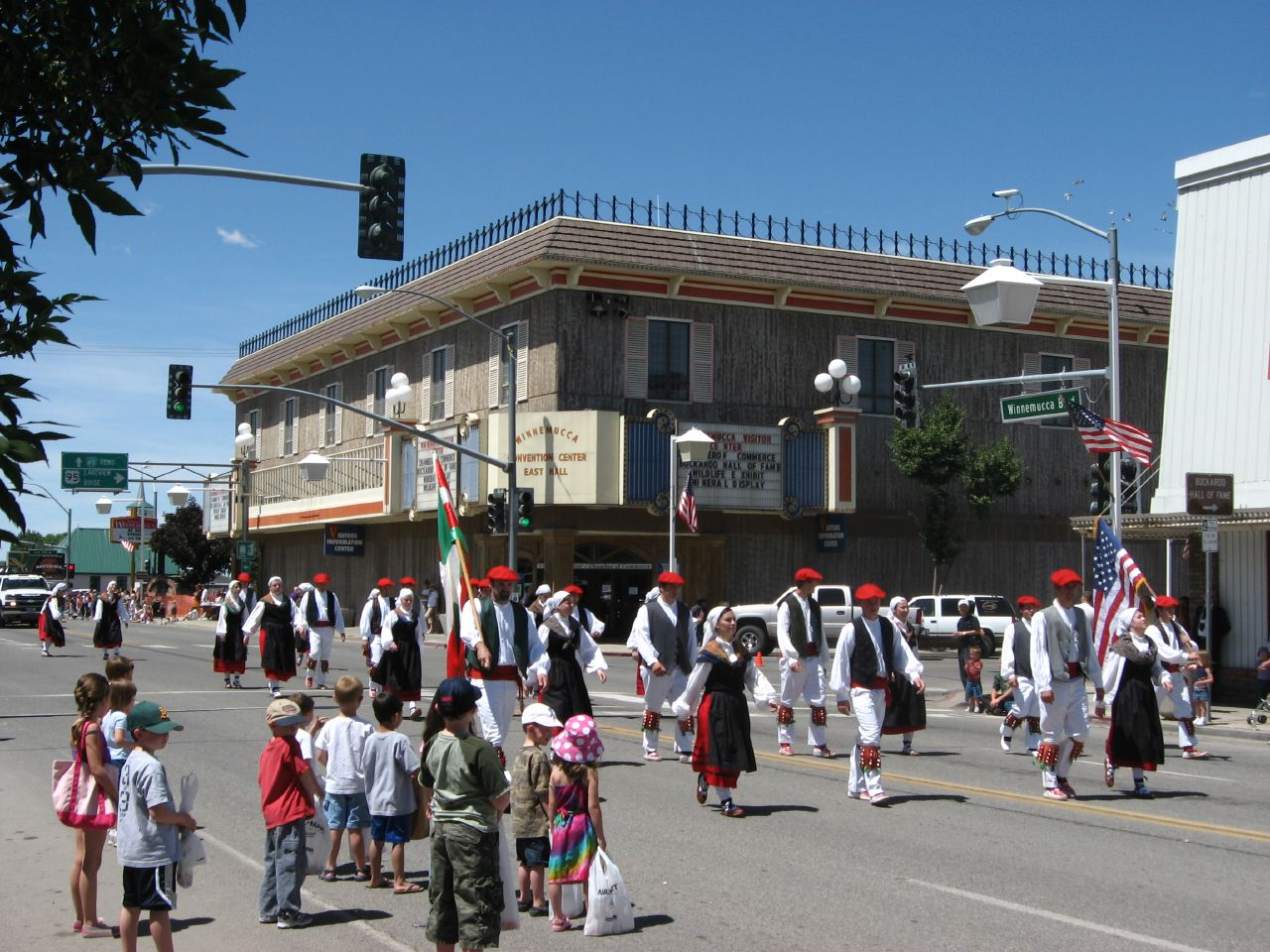
Basque festival in Winnemucca.

Basque festivals, also known as Euskal jaiak, are festivals celebrating Basque culture, including Basque dance, Basque cuisine, Basque sports, and elements of Basque folklore. Basque festivals are organized in the United States of America in towns with an important population of Basque descendants, such as Elko, Reno, Winnemucca, Bakersfield, Chino, San Francisco, and Boise. The first Western Basque Festival was held in Sparks, Nevada, on June 6–7, 1956. Elko hosts one of the largest Basque Festivals in the United States, second only to Boise's world famous Jaialdi, held roughly every five years around the 4th of July weekend. Similar festivals are celebrated in Argentina and other countries where Basque diaspora is set. Basque festivals are also celebrated in the Basque Country: Euskal Jaiak celebrations in September in San Sebastián and Zarautz are famous.

Dates of Basque festivals in the United States often correspond with a saint's day in the Basque Country. Early examples of Basque festivals date from the late 19th century, when the Lore Jokoak, or Basque Floral Games came into being in French-Spanish bordering areas of Navarre, Labourd, and Gipuzkoa, fostered and encouraged by Antoine d'Abbadie and other cultural figures.
