= Arizona cheese crisp =

Cheese dish

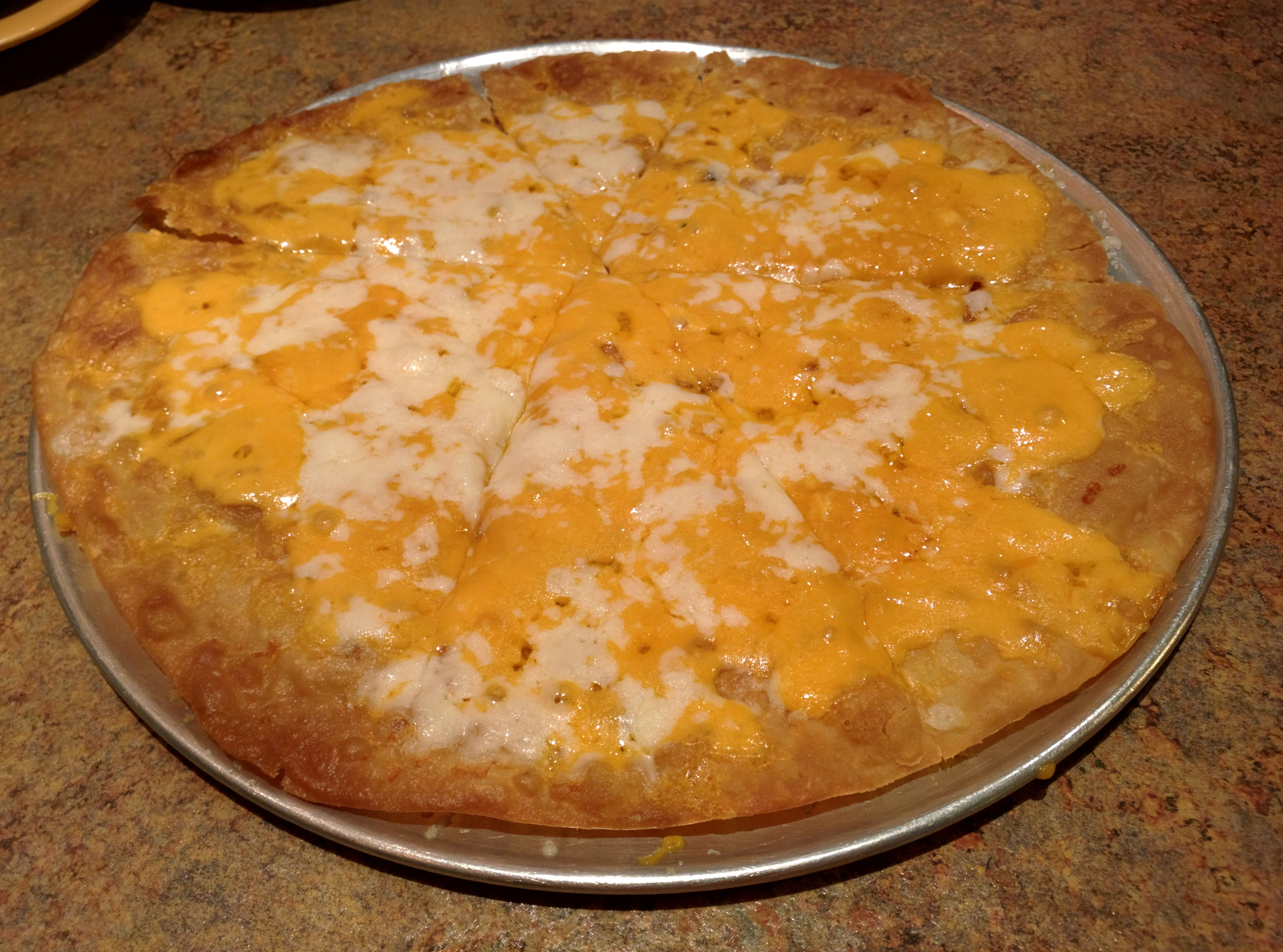
- Alternative names: Cheese crisp
- Place of origin: Arizona, United States
- Main ingredients: Tortillas, cheese

An Arizona cheese crisp (simply cheese crisp in the region) is an open-faced, flour tortilla covered in shredded cheese. It is put on a metal pizza pan that has been brushed with butter or margarine and put under a broiler until it gets crisp. It is similar to a quesadilla, but distinct in that a cheese crisp is not folded over, and that it is also baked until the tortilla becomes crisp. Common cheeses to use include in various combinations are Oaxaca, Monterey Jack, or cheddar. Cheese crisps sometimes are topped with onions, cilantro, or peppers.

Cheese crisps are served as appetizers at most Phoenix-area and Tucson-area Mexican restaurants, but are rarely found outside the state, other than places popular with Arizonan tourists such as Puerto Peñasco and San Diego.

== See also ==
- Frico
- Welsh rabbit
- Khachapuri
