= Carne seca =

Mexican dried beef

Carne Seca
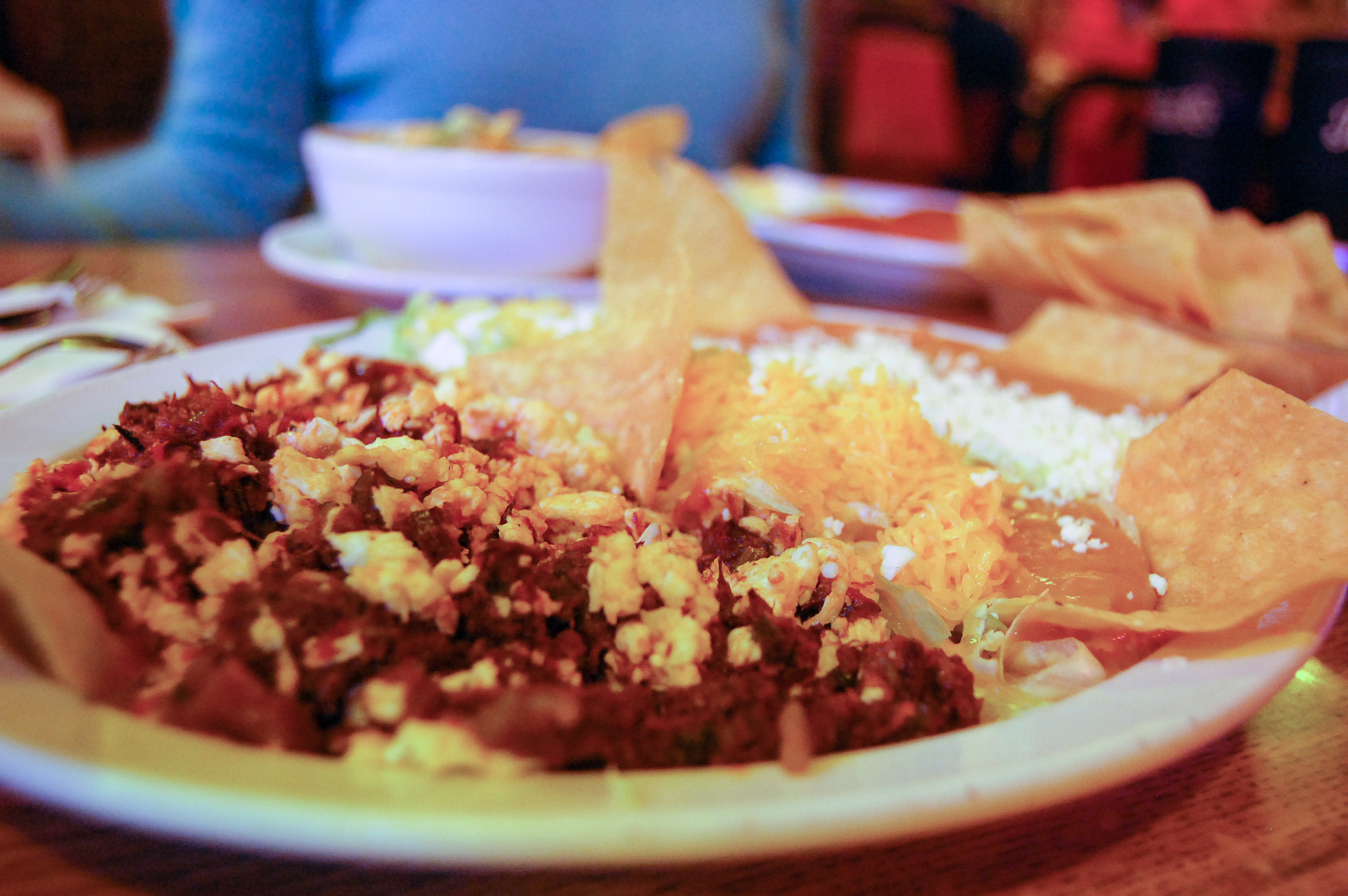
- Type: Meat
- Place of origin: Mexico
- Region or state: Northern Mexico and Southwestern United States
- Associated cuisine: Mexican cuisine
- Main ingredients: Beef

Carne seca ("dried meat" in Spanish) is a type of dried beef used in Mexican cuisine.

== Regional variants ==
=== Northern Mexico ===
In northern Mexican cuisine, particularly the states of Chihuahua, Sonora, and Nuevo León, carne seca is cooked in a dish called machacado (named machaca in other states), which includes tomatoes, onions, chile verde, and eggs. Sometimes, potatoes are included or used in lieu of eggs.

=== Southwestern United States ===
==== Arizona ====
In Arizona, according to Marian Burros of The New York Times, carne seca is a popular meat filling used by Tucson-area Mexican restaurants in enchiladas, chimichangas, and tacos, and is sometimes mixed with eggs.

==== California ====
According to The Oxford Companion to American Food and Drink, the newly arrived Anglo-Californians had acquired the taste for carne seca from their Californio neighbors during the 19th century California Gold Rush era.

==== New Mexico ====
In New Mexico, the term carne seca in New Mexican cuisine refers to a thinly sliced variant of jerky, the style influenced by Hispano, Navajo, and Pueblo communities resulting in a crispy consistency reminiscent of a potato chip or a cracker.In northern New Mexico, the style is commonly sold from roadside trailers, with vendors operating in Española, Santa Fe, Las Vegas, and Las Cruces. Producers describe the recipe as combining the thin cuts of Mexican carne asada with New Mexican spices.Common flavorings include New Mexico red and green chile, sometimes combined in a “Christmas” variety, after the New Mexican custom of ordering both chiles together.

== See also ==
- List of dried foods
