= List of restaurants in Albuquerque, New Mexico =

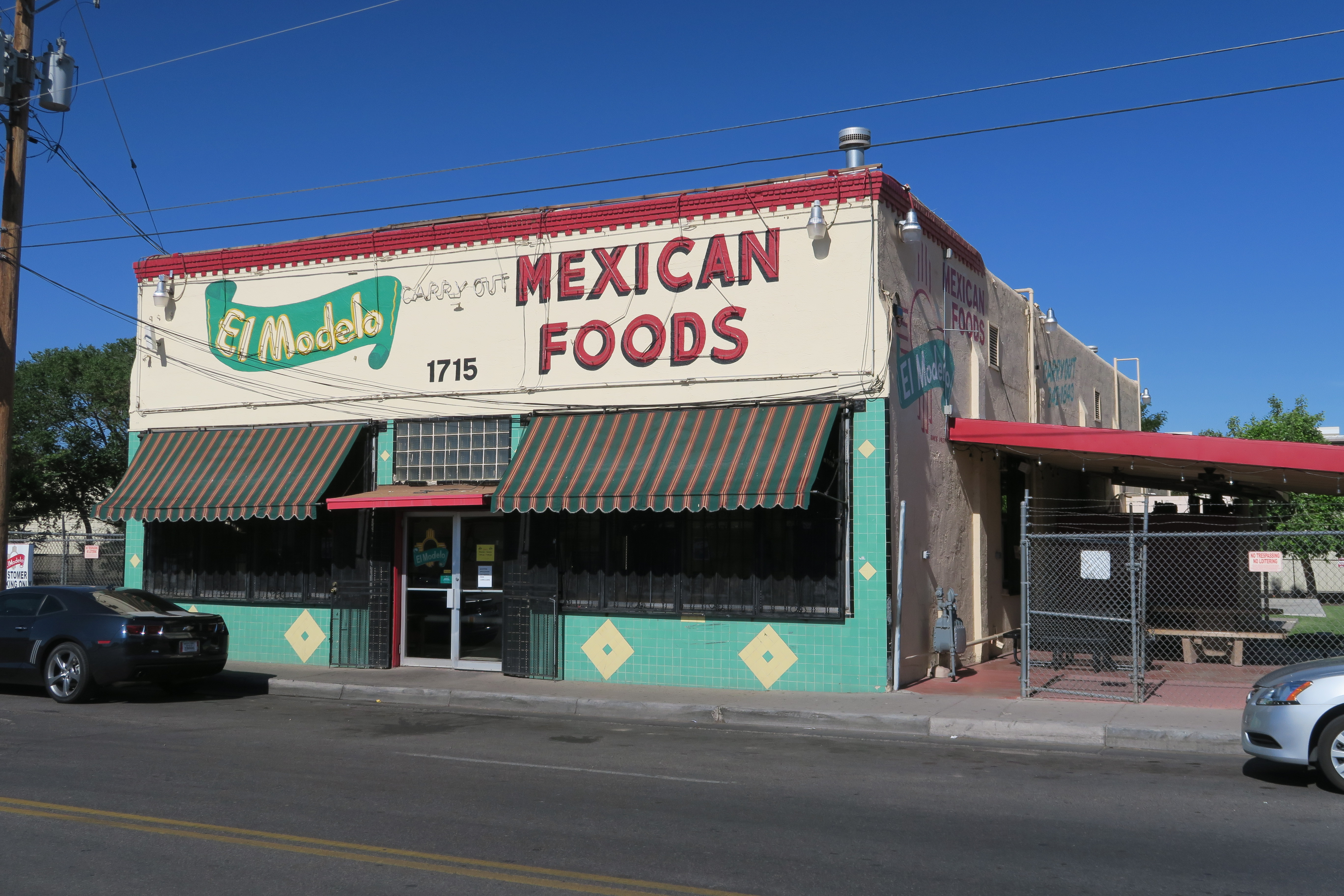
El Modelo

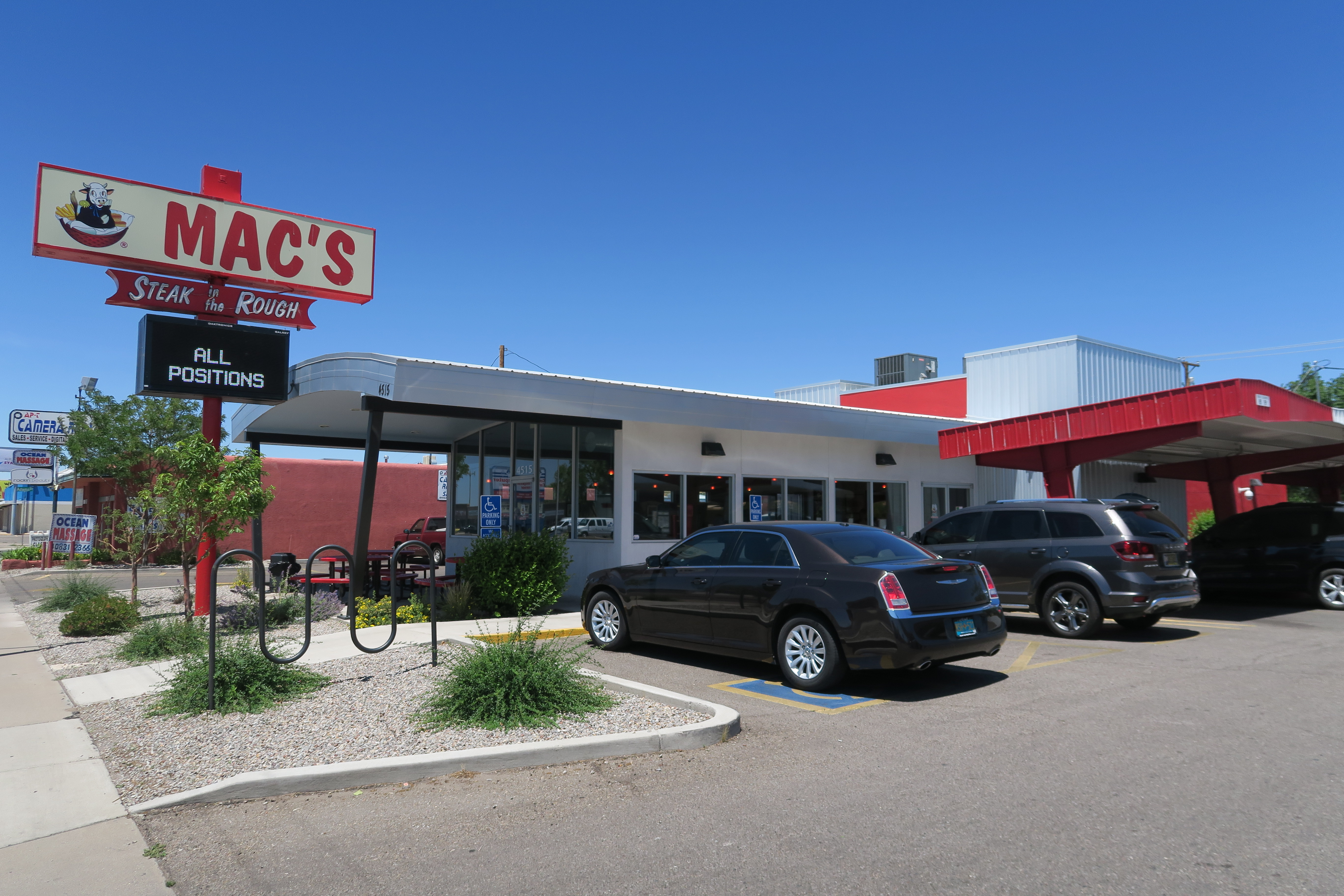
Mac's Steak in the Rough

Following is a list of notable restaurants in Albuquerque, New Mexico:

- Blake's Lotaburger
- Boba Tea Company
- Canteen Brewhouse
- Dion's
- El Modelo
- Flying Star
- Frontier Restaurant
- Garduño's
- Little Anita's
- Los Pollos Hermanos (pop-up)
- Mac's La Sierra
- Mac's Steak in the Rough
- Mary & Tito's Cafe
- M. & J. Sanitary Tortilla Factory
- Sadie's
- Tim's Place
- Tractor Brewing Company
- Twisters

== See also ==
- New Mexico breweries
- New Mexico wine
  - Middle Rio Grande Valley AVA
