= Albuquerque craft beer market =

The Albuquerque craft beer market consists of a growing list of local emerging alcohol manufacturing and retail businesses catering to a target consumption audience. According to 2011 US Census Bureau data, the Albuquerque Metropolitan Area has 29 establishments categorized under the 445(3)(1) Beer, Wine, and Liquor stores designations. The New Mexico Secretary of State's website shows of the 123 brewing businesses applying for a license in the State of New Mexico, 70 were current and 23 were specific to Albuquerque. According to the Brewers Association, craft beers sales have grown 15% in the last year, while standard beers like Budweiser, Miller Lite, and Coors have only seen a 1% increase.

== History ==
New Mexico as a whole has a long history of brewing beer dating back to the 1880s with the import of the Illinois Brewing Company brewing operations to Socorro, New Mexico. The brewer William Hammel moved to Socorro primarily for medical reasons, but was able to create a successful business, the building still stands today as the Hammel Museum. Albuquerque's craft beer history slowly began to take shape in the late twentieth century. While homebrewing has been popular in Albuquerque for more than forty years, business-to-business B2B and business-to-consumer B2C craft beer markets for commercial craft beer providers began with the Santa Fe Brewing Company in Santa Fe, New Mexico. Since the first batch from the Santa Fe Brewing Company in 1988, the brew house has proven the New Mexico craft beer market is ripe for quality brewers.

== Breweries ==
Brewery	License Type
Albuquerque Brewing Company	Small brewer
Bosque Brewing Company	Small brewer & wholesaler
Broken Bottle Brewery	Small brewer, wholesaler & restaurant
Chama River Brewing Company	Small brewer & wholesaler
Canteen Brewhouse (formerly: Il Vicino Brewing Co.)	Small brewer & restaurant
Kelly's Brew Pub	Small brewer & restaurant
La Cumbre Brewing Company	Small brewer & wholesaler
Lizard Tail Brewing Company	Small brewer
Marble Brewery	Small brewer & wholesaler
Outlaws Brewery	Small brewer & wholesaler
Rio Grande Brewing Company	Small brewer & wholesaler
Santa Fe Brewing Company	Small brewer & wholesaler
Tractor Brewing Company	Small brewer & wholesaler
Turtle Mountain Brewing Company	Small brewer & restaurant

== Homebrewing ==
Name
Southwest Grape and Grain
The Grain Hopper
Victor's Grape Arbor

== Organizations ==
Many local organizations have arisen to support and enhance the Albuquerque craft beer market. From informal local craft homebrewers, The Dukes of Ale, to formal businesses designed to promote the New Mexico microbreweries such as the New Mexico Brewers Guild.

== Events ==
The Albuquerque craft beer market has benefited from significant advertising events that various groups from the Albuquerque Metropolitan and New Mexico area host in an effort to promote the expansion of the craft beer market. Such events include:

- The Albuquerque Hop Fest
- Albuquerque Blues and Brews
- Albuquerque Beer Week

These groups also develop slogans such as "The Beer Frontier" in an effort to differentiate the Albuquerque craft beer market from other markets such as Portland, Oregon; San Francisco, California; San Diego, California; Boston, Massachusetts; Denver, Colorado; Philadelphia, Pennsylvania; Bend, Oregon; and Asheville, North Carolina.

== Tourism ==
The City of Albuquerque works to promote the large local craft beer industry by adding information about local breweries and interest groups to their tourism website "New Mexico True." The website promotes the "Ale Trail", a map and flyer listing the breweries throughout New Mexico. The advertising campaign is a nod to the historic El Camino Real, a historic route that New Mexico has used to attract tourists in the past.

== Legislation ==
In 2014, the New Mexico State Senate designated a portion of Albuquerque's downtown area the "Brewery District." The sale of alcohol in New Mexico is well regulated with complex fees and penalties for alcohol producing and selling businesses.
