= Monastery of Christ in the Desert =

Benedictine monastery in Abiquiu, New Mexico

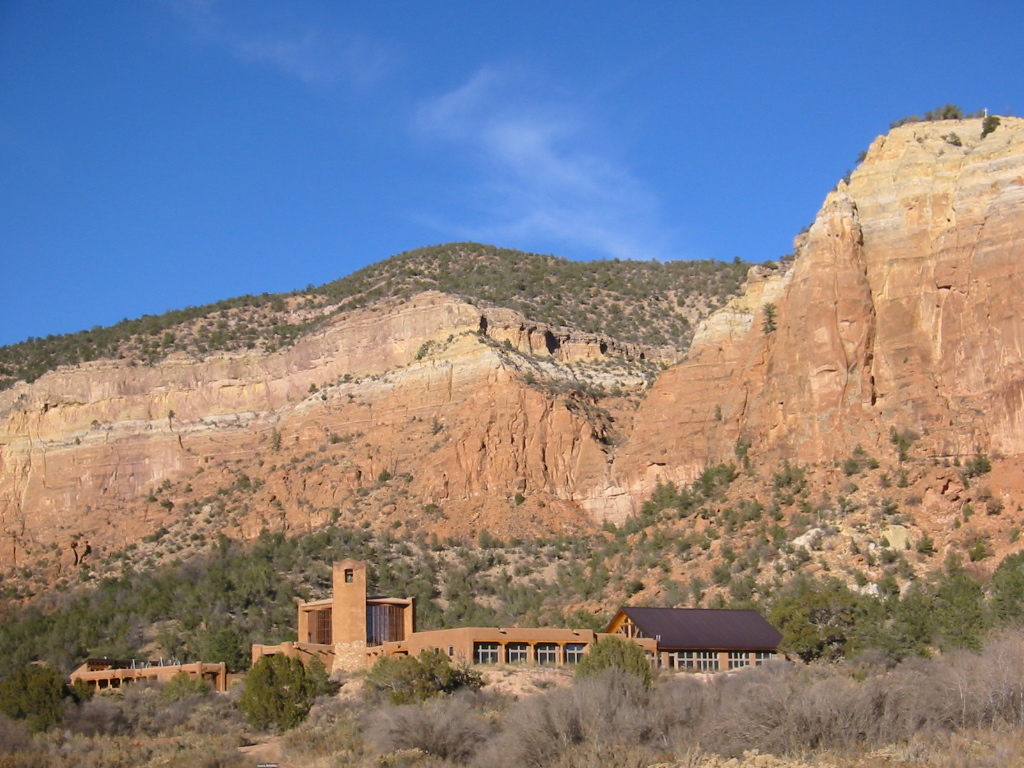

- Location within New Mexico

Monastery information
- Order: Benedictine
- Established: 1964
- Mother house: Mount Savior Monastery (Pine City, New York, United States)
- Diocese: Archdiocese of Santa Fe

People
- Founders: Aelred Wall, O.S.B.
- Important associated figures: Thomas Merton

Architecture
- Architect: George Nakashima

Site
- Location: Abiquiu, Rio Arriba County, New Mexico, United States
- Coordinates: 36°22′40.80″N 106°40′49.80″W

The Monastery of Christ in the Desert is a Benedictine monastery in Abiquiu, New Mexico. It belongs to the English Province of the Subiaco Congregation.

It is located in the Chama River Canyon Wilderness area 75 miles north of Santa Fe. It is accessible by Forest Road 151, a 13-mile dirt road off of US route 84.

== History ==
The monastery was founded in 1964 by Aelred Wall, O.S.B., with monks from the Benedictine Mount Saviour Monastery in Pine City, New York. In 1983 the monastery was received into the English Province of the Subiaco Congregation as a Conventual Priory, and in 1996, it became an autonomous Abbey. As of 2019, there were about thirty monks. While members of the community are from a number of countries, English is the common language of the house.

In 1995 the monastery started an internet web design service called "scriptorium@christdesert". The web scriptorium was very successful and drew coverage from the Associated Press and The New York Times, Time, and other media outlets. The web scriptorium closed down in 1998 when it became apparent that their work as web designers distracted from their vocations as monks.

In 2006 the monastery was the setting for a Discovery Channel episode of the TLC documentary series entitled The Monastery. The series followed the experiences of five laymen who lived in the monastery and observed the monastic way of life for forty days.

The original monastery was designed by George Nakashima. It is powered by propane and solar panels. The monastery maintains one of the largest private solar power systems in the US.

Christ in the Desert has three daughter houses: Nuestra Senora de la Soledad, and Monasterio Benedictino De Santa María y Todos Los Santos in Mexico, and the Benedictine Monastery of Thien Tam (Heavenly Heart) in Kerens, Texas.

== Apostolates ==
It has a guesthouse in which men and women can stay and join the monks in the chapel to share in the monastic Divine Office and in the Mass. In addition to maintaining the guesthouse, the monks manage a gift shop of books and religious items.

In an effort to balance generating income for support with the monastic way of life, the monks have tested a number of activities. They had a thrift shop in Santa Fe for a few years. The monks work in agriculture, computer work and maintenance of the grounds and facilities. They also craft beer, soap, lotions, candles, pottery and artwork along with other ventures.

== Brewing ==
The Monastery of Christ in the Desert has operated a small brewery, Abbey Brewing Company, since 2005. The brewery produces three beers: Monks' Ale, Monks' Wit, and Monks' Tripel. The beers are currently brewed by Abbey Brewing using facilities at Sierra Blanca Brewing Company in Moriarty, with an experimental brewery located at the monastery. Abbey Brewing Company currently has distribution in eight states, with plans for gradual expansion in the future.

== See also ==
- Monastery of the Holy Cross
- NextScribe - an independent research project
