= Marble Brewery =

Marble Brewery may refer to:

- Marble Brewery (Albuquerque, New Mexico), an American brewery
- Marble Brewery (Manchester), a British brewery
