= Southwestern Brewery and Ice Company =

Coordinates: 35.089012°N 106.645446°W

- U.S. National Register of Historic Places
- NM State Register of Cultural Properties
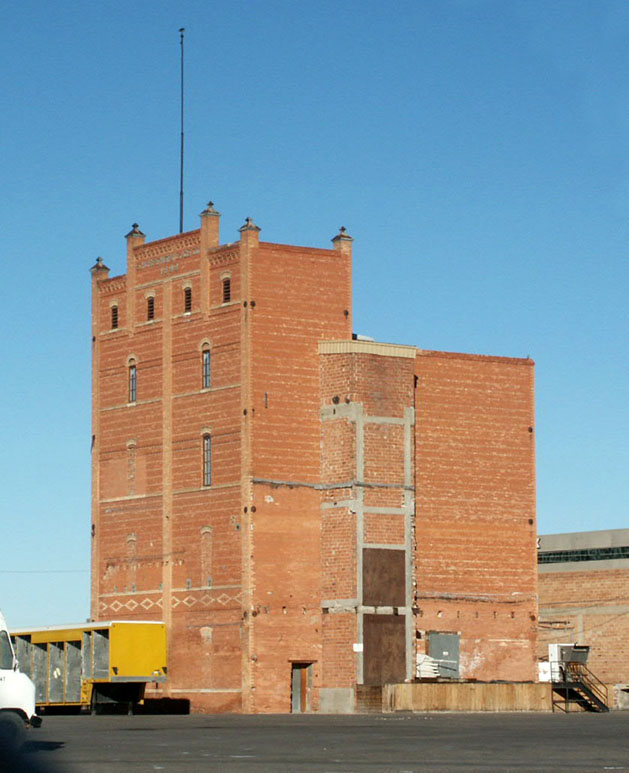
- Southwestern Brewery, south and east elevations
- Location: 601 Commercial St. NE; Albuquerque, New Mexico
- Built: 1899; 127 years ago
- NRHP reference No.: 78001807
- NMSRCP No.: 397

Significant dates
- Added to NRHP: March 30, 1978
- Designated NMSRCP: July 25, 1975

The Southwestern Brewery and Ice Company is a historic brewery in Albuquerque, New Mexico, located adjacent to the BNSF railroad tracks in East Downtown. Built in 1899, it is one of the only surviving 19th-century commercial buildings in the downtown area.

== History ==
The Southwestern Brewery was founded in 1888 by Don and Harry Rankin, and later taken over by Jacob and Henry Loebs. By the start of the 20th century it was one of Albuquerque's largest employers and its flagship product, Glorieta Beer, was distributed throughout the southwest. The statewide enactment of Prohibition in 1917 forced the company out of the brewing business, but its ice-making operations remained profitable. The facility changed hands several times starting in 1948, but continued to produce ice for most of the 20th century. It finally closed in 1997.

The brewery was added to the New Mexico State Register of Cultural Properties in 1975 and the National Register of Historic Places in 1978. In 1998, the former cold storage and mechanical building on the south side of the complex was destroyed by a fire that also slightly damaged the main brewery building.

== See also ==
- List of breweries in New Mexico
- List of defunct breweries in the United States
