= Sheri Crider =

American artist

Sheri Crider is an American artist based in Albuquerque, New Mexico. She has exhibited across the United States. Crider's work spans various mediums, including sculpture, painting, drawing, and video, and explores criminal justice reform and its impact on the lives of marginalized individuals.

Originally from Phoenix, Arizona, she faced homelessness and addiction at a young age, leading to her early encounters with the criminal justice system. She later attended the University of New Mexico, where she earned her Master of Fine Arts (MFA) degree in sculpture in 2001.

== Sanitary Tortilla Factory ==
In 2008, Crider opened the SCA Contemporary Gallery, an exhibition space for artists, in the Wells Park neighborhood of Albuquerque, New Mexico.

In 2015, she moved the gallery to a building that formerly housed M. & J. Sanitary Tortilla Factory, and established the Sanitary Tortilla Factory (STF) in 2015. This multi-functional arts venue is located in Albuquerque, New Mexico includes an exhibition gallery, fabrication space, 15 artist studios, and a social practice residency.

== Intersection of art and social justice ==
Crider's artwork often focuses on themes of criminal justice reform, immigration, and systemic inequalities. She challenges conventional notions of safety, crime, and punishment through projects like "NonTactical Monuments," where she repurposes policing equipment. Her work also highlights the connections between incarceration and immigration, emphasizing the shared struggles faced by marginalized communities.

Crider was recognized by the Art for Justice Fund, which named her one of the Spring 2023 Art for Justice Grantees. This recognition of her support for currently and formerly incarcerated artists and amplifying narratives from marginalized communities. Crider's projects, including the "Mobile Abolition Library" and collaborations with various artists and organizations, aim to dismantle connections between incarceration and public safety.

== Awards and other recognition ==
- 2023: Art for Justice Fellow, New York, New York
- 2020: Fulcrum Fund Grant, Albuquerque, New Mexico
- 2017: Right of Return Fellow, New York, New York
