= Mount Saviour Monastery =

- U.S. National Register of Historic Places
- U.S. Historic district
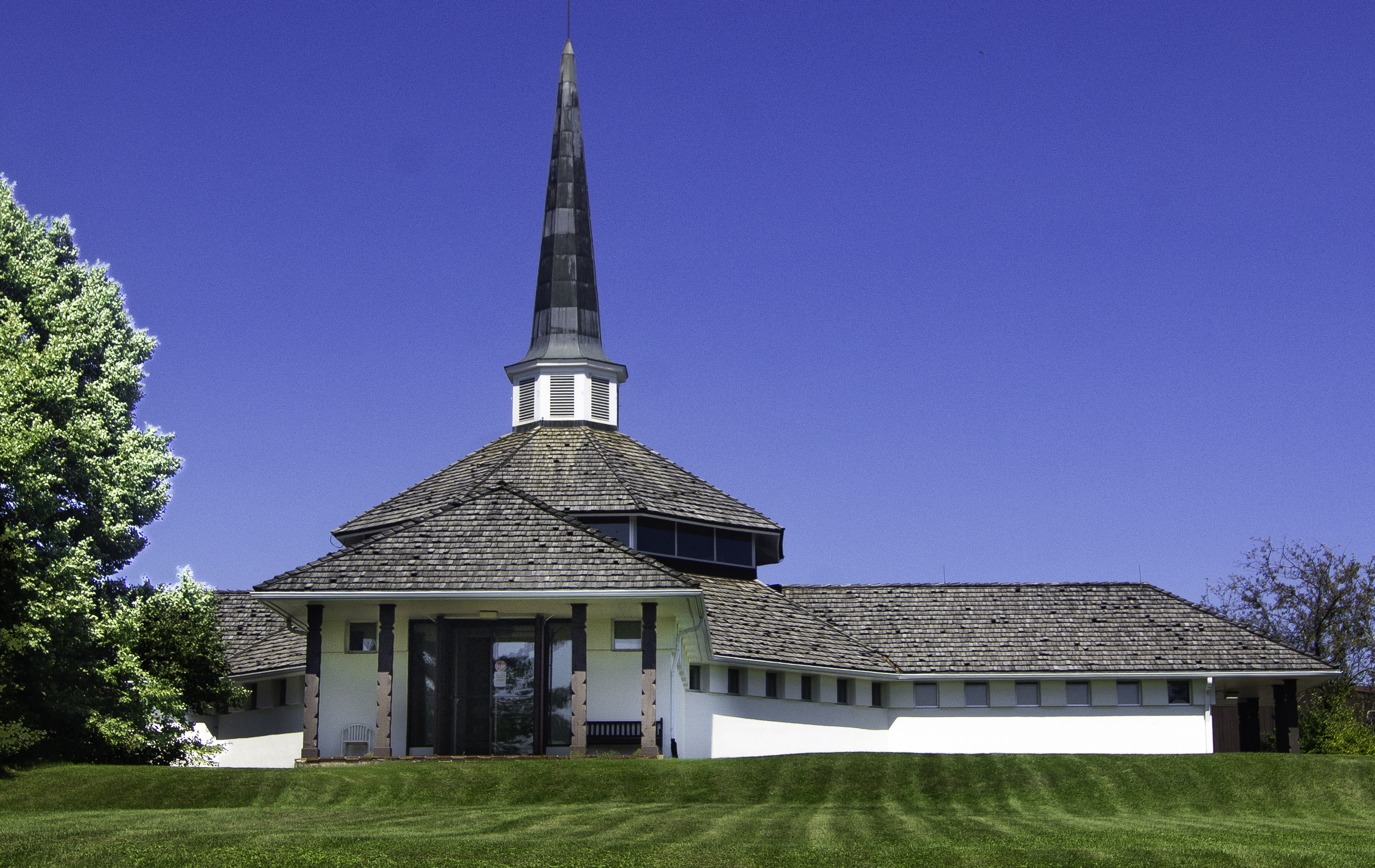

- Location within New York Location within the United States
- Location: 231, 121, 122 Monastery & 65, 212 Fisher Hill Rds, near Pine City, New York
- Coordinates: 42°05′24″N 76°57′34″W
- Area: 1,064 acres (431 ha)
- Built: c. 1865-1964
- Architect: J. Sanford Shanley & Ronald E. Cassetti
- Architectural style: Italianate, Gothic Revival, Abstract Modernist
- NRHP reference No.: 14001213
- Added to NRHP: January 27, 2015

Mount Saviour Monastery is a historic farm and monastery campus within a national historic district located near Pine City, Chemung County, New York.

It encompasses 10 contributing buildings and 3 contributing sites on a working farm in continuous operation since 1865. The monastery was founded in 1950 and the property is owned by the Benedictine Foundation of New York State. Located on the property are the contributing Our Lady Queen of Peace Chapel (1953) and East and West Buildings (1964), St. Joseph's House (1954–1957), St. Peter's House (Former Nagel/Hofbauer House, 1874), St. Gertrude's House (Former Durmstadt House, 1865), Mount Saviour Monastic Cemetery (1960), Good Shepherd Lay Cemetery (1955), St. Peter's Barn (Former Nagel/Hofbauer Barn, c.1890/1942), Main barn (1959), Arts & Crafts Building & Storage (Former Shop Building and Kiln, 1962/1973), Wagner House (Former Neilitz House, 1879), St. James's House (Former Harding House, 1870), and Annex (Former milk house and now monastery guest house, 1870/1961).

It was added to the National Register of Historic Places in 2015.

The Monastery of Christ in the Desert in Abiquiú, New Mexico developed from Mount Saviour in 1964.
