= Abbey Brewing Company =

American brewing company

Abbey Brewing Company, LLC

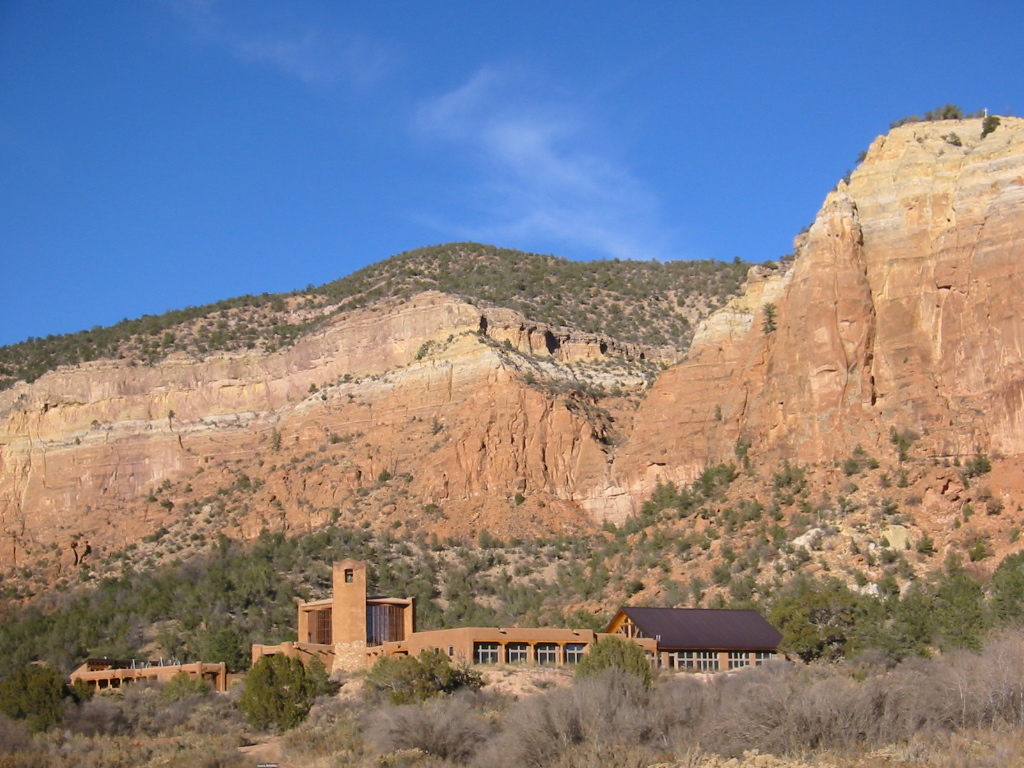
- Monastery of Christ in the Desert
- Interactive map of Abbey Brewing Company, LLC
- Type: Craft beers in the monastic tradition of Europe and contemporary American
- Location: Abiquiú, New Mexico, US
- Coordinates: 36°22′40.80″N 106°40′49.80″W
- Opened: 2005
- Annual production volume: 2,900 US beer barrels (3,400 hL)
- Distribution: New Mexico, Missouri, Chile, and Taiwan
- Tasting: Bode' General Store - 21196 US-84, Abiquiu, NM 87510, USA Monks' Corner Taproom - 205 Silver Avenue SW, Albuquerque, NM
- Website: www.abbeybrewing.biz

Active beers
Name	Type
Monks' Ale	Belgian Abbey Enkel
Monks' Dark	Hybrid Signature
Monks' Dubbel	Belgian Abbey Dubbel
Monks' Golden	German Kristal Weissbier
Monks' IPA #1	American IPAl
Monks' Tripel	Belgian Abbey Tripel
Monks' Wit	Belgian Witbier

Seasonal beers
Name	Type
Monks' Dark Night	{{{style}}}
Monks' Dark Chocolate	{{{style}}}
Monks' Dubbel Reserve	{{{style}}}
Monks' Tripel Reserve	{{{style}}}
Monks' Summer of Wit Series	{{{style}}}

The Abbey Brewing Company is an American craft brewing company located in the Chama River Wilderness Area near Abiquiú, New Mexico. The microbrewery was founded in 2003 as a Benedictine joint venture of Our Lady of Guadalupe Monastery in Pecos, New Mexico and the Monastery of Christ in the Desert in Abiquiú. It is the first American monastery brewery founded since before the Prohibition Era. The brewery's motto is "Made with care and prayer".

The brothers maintain that: "Our focus in all our work is 'to bring everything to perfection for the glory of God' as the Rule of Saint Benedict instructs us." (Note: "The monks live according to the Rule of St. Benedict that, in part, says everything the brothers undertake should be brought to perfection for the glory of God," Merchant says. "We take that as an admonition to make great beer.") (Note: "Modern brewing practices grew up within Benedictine monasteries, where beer provided good sustenance, sanitary drink, and probably some mirth (at least for the pilgrims). The monks even created a special brew to sustain Lenten fasts, the double bock, classically seen in Paulaner's Salvator("The Savior"; look for St. Francis Paola on the Paulener label).")

== History ==
The brewery initially focused on producing European monastic-style beers, with the first commercial production of Monks' Ale in late 2005. By 2010, the Monastery of Christ in the Desert had bought out the interest of Our Lady of Guadalupe Monastery. While retaining a significant financial interest in the brewery, the Monastery of Christ in the Desert sold its equity position to two private investors in 2013. Also, in 2010 the first harvest of native hops (neo mexicanus) grown at the Monastery of Christ in the Desert used to brew the Reserve Series of Ales was harvested. The brewery opened the Monks' Corner Tap Room in Albuquerque, New Mexico, in 2016. Products were first exported to Taiwan in 2016 and then to Chile in 2017.

== Operations ==
Initially, brewing operations were conducted at Our Lady of Guadalupe Monastery in Pecos, New Mexico. In early 2012 brewing operations were legally transferred to the Monastery of Christ in the Desert. A new, dedicated standalone brewery building was completed and commissioned in 2012 on the grounds of the Monastery of Christ in the Desert.

Brewing at both monasteries focused on, and continues to be, developing new beer styles and limited commercial production of small draft batches on a half-barrel brewing system. Because of the minimal access by large trucks, large-scale batches are brewed under an Alternating Proprietorship In Moriarty, New Mexico, on a 20-barrel brewing system. Both bottles and draft packaging occur at the brewery in Moriarty.

== Production ==
The Monastery of Christ in the Desert near Abiquiú, New Mexico, hosts the master brewery licensed by the US Department of the Treasury, Alcohol and Tobacco Tax and Trade Bureau, and the New Mexico Alcohol and Gaming Division. The licensed brewery houses a half-barrel brewing system to develop all new beers and for limited small-batch production in draft. The Abbey Brewing Company owns all brewing equipment on the Monastery of Christ in the Desert grounds. The monastery brewery was designed for flexibility and expansion to a more extensive brewing system of up to 7 barrels. Like the Monastery, the brewery is off the electrical grid and powered by solar panels and propane. Water is recycled, and spent grains are used in the hop yard for compost. The brewery is located in the private living space of the community of monks and is not open for visits.

A larger production brewery is operated under an Alternating Proprietorship in Moriarty, New Mexico, where the Abbey Brewing Company controls the entire brewing process, including the formulae and brewing processes. The company maintains direct control over sourcing both ingredients and packaging. At the Moriarty Brewery, some of the significant brewing equipment is owned by Abbey Brewing Company. The Moriarty Brewery consists of a two-vessel, 20-barrel capacity brewing system with 40 barrel fermenting vessels and brite tanks. The current capacity for the Abbey Brewing Company at this location is 2,900 barrels per year.

In the spring of 2010, several varieties of native New Mexican hops (subspecies neomexicanus) were planted on a one-quarter-acre plot at the Monastery of Christ in the Desert, and the first harvest occurred in September. In the following year, the hop yard was expanded to a half acre. Each fall, usually in September, the monks and guests harvest, and process hops by hand. Monks' Ales with the designation of Reserve are made with hops from the monastery hop yard. When available, the monastery hops are available online to homebrewers via Holy Hops, LLC on the website HolyHops.biz.

== Personnel ==
The general manager and assistant brewer of Abbey Brewing Company is Berkeley Merchant. =He holds a chemistry degree from Bowdoin College and a Master of Business Administration from Boston University. Mr. Merchant is an Oblate of the Monastery of Christ in the Desert, a lay monk with the monastic name of Brother Barnabas, who is a practitioner of Benedictine spirituality.

The head brewer of the Abbey Brewing Company is Brad Krauss, a native of New Mexico. He holds a degree in chemistry from Rice University and has worked in New Mexico craft beer brewing for two decades, including startup work for Rio Bravo Brewing Company (Albuquerque), Wolf Canyon Brewing (Santa Fe), Isotopes Brewing Company (Albuquerque), Bogota Brewing Company (Bogota, Colombia) and La Rana Dorada Brewing (Panama City, Panama). "A 30+ year craft brewing veteran and Master BJCP Judge with over 130 medals won in international competition," he helped them develop original recipes.

== Regular brews ==
- Monks' Ale, an Abbey Single (Enkel) Ale, first produced in 2006. Similar to a Belgian pale ale, but darker, it is a medium-bodied, malt-dominant, amber/copper brew with an ABV of 5.2 percent.
- Monks' Wit, a witbier (wheat beer), first produced in 2010.
- Monks' Tripel, a gold light to medium-bodied Belgian tripel, was first produced in 2012, with an ABV of 9.2 percent.
- Monks' Dubbel, a medium-bodied Belgian dubbel, was first produced in 2013, with an ABV of 6.7 percent. (Note: "Despite their initial focus on Belgian beers, Abbey Beverage Company seeks to draw from its eclectic order of monks, who hail from five different continents, to craft other European-inspired monastic brews as they slowly expand their 1/2-barrel brewing system to seven barrels.")

== Awards ==
Monks' Ales are infrequently entered into competition.

In 2014, the Abbey Brewing Company won one gold, one silver, and two bronze medals in the New Mexico State Fair Beer Pro-Am competition. The gold was awarded to their limited specialty brew, Monks' Tripel Reserve.

In 2014 Abbey Brewing Company won a silver medal at the Denver International Beer Competition.

In 2017 Abbey Brewing Company was awarded a gold medal for Monks' Ale at the Copa de Cervezas de las Américas in Santiago, Chile, as well as a gold medal for Monks' Ale for Best of Class – Trappist Style Ales, as well as a bronze medal for the Monk' Dubbel.

== See also ==
- List of breweries in New Mexico
- List of microbreweries
