= Mary & Tito's Cafe =

Restaurant in Albuquerque, New Mexico, U.S.

- Interactive map of Mary & Tito's Cafe

Restaurant information
- Established: 1963
- Location: 2711 4th Street NW, Albuquerque, New Mexico, 87107, United States
- Coordinates: 35°06′44″N 106°38′47″W

Mary & Tito's Cafe is a restaurant in Albuquerque, New Mexico. It was established in 1963 and has been recognized as one of "America's Classics" by the James Beard Foundation. The restaurant's Carne Adovada Turnover has pork shoulder meat and Wisconsin cheddar cheese in a flour tortilla.

== See also ==
- List of James Beard America's Classics
- List of restaurants in Albuquerque, New Mexico
