= NextScribe =

American religious corporation

NextScribe is a nonprofit corporation dedicated to creating a place on the Web that promotes spirituality, understanding and peace. It arose from a web design project developed in 1994 by then Brother Mary Aquinas Woodworth at the Monastery of Christ in the Desert in New Mexico.

The organization conducts research and development in the field of computer supported spiritual development (CSSD). NextScribe continues to conduct research in the field in partnership with both Catholic and Protestant organizations.

== History ==
NextScribe has its roots at the Monastery of Christ in the Desert in New Mexico, which established a web design studio in 1995 and produced one of the first web sites on the topic of spirituality. The site was illustrated with watercolors by one of the monks. As a result of wide publicity over the period 1995–1997, the web site became known not only for its HTML programming, but for the beautiful artwork the monks worked into their pages, reminiscent of medieval illuminated text.

In 1996 the monastery's web project director and systems analyst, Brother Mary Aquinas Woodworth, traveled to Vatican City, where he served as a consultant to the Holy See. Initially intended as a means to supplement the monastery's income, the web scriptorium closed in 1998 when the volume of work began to overwhelm the community's monastic life. That same year Woodworth left the monastery and returned to secular life to explore the use of information technology in religion. Chancellor of the Archdiocese of Denver, Francis X. Maier, said, "In a sense, the Web isn’t a very important issue at all when you look at poverty and violence, but in another sense, it’s very important because it represents the new language that we can use to talk about all these other issues."

While there he clarified his mission to pursue the development of advanced technologies of CSSD that would enable the Church to reform its structure according to classical spiritual practices in the tradition of St. Benedict. NextScribe was founded in Vatican City in 1997 to pursue this objective.

== Computer supported spiritual development ==
Computer supported spiritual development (CSSD) is a multidisciplinary study that can span research in multiuser gaming environments, sociology, psychology, spiritual life, artificial intelligence and other topics, but current research is most closely related to computer-supported collaboration as it applies to spiritual life and spiritual community. CSSD includes spiritual formation, but it is not limited to formation.

== Research ==
Since its founding in 1997, NextScribe has conducted seminal research in CSSD in association with both Catholic and Protestant organizations.

Some of NextScribe's most important research was conducted in 2002–2003 in partnership with the multi-denominational Youth Ministry and Spirituality Project (YMSP), funded by the Lily Endowment.

== Theology of work ==
Within the Benedictine tradition of ora et labora (prayer and work), NextScribe's mission was established upon a "Theology of Work" that was composed for the project in 1997. Accordingly, NextScribe conceives creative technological development as a process of union with God as Creator. As an integral companion to Prayerbuddy, NextScribe established the Industrial Theology project in order to explore the theological basis for work and creativity, the right disposition of organizations that support work, and spiritual practices that might complete the union of a worker with God as Creator.
