= Tim's Place =

- Interactive map of Tim's Place

Restaurant information
- Established: 2010
- Owner: Tim Harris
- Dress code: Casual
- Location: 8050 Academy Rd NE #101, Albuquerque, New Mexico, 87111, United States
- Coordinates: 35.146962°N 106.550361°W
- Website: www.timsplace.com

Tim's Place was an American and New Mexican cuisine restaurant in the city of Albuquerque, New Mexico, which was founded in 2010. The restaurant, which was owned by Tim Harris, was the only restaurant in the United States owned by a person with down syndrome. The restaurant closed in December 2015.

== History ==
The restaurant was founded by Tim Harris in 2010. Both of Tim's parents, Keith and Jeannie, have been supportive of their children's ambitions; the initial investment for the restaurant came from his father. The restaurant was founded with the goal of emphasizing friendliness.

In July 2014, it was announced that Tim's Place would be subject of a reality show. As a result, Tim moved to Denver, Colorado, to pursue the production, but the plans were never realized. He moved back to Albuquerque, still giving out hugs, but plans to reopen the restaurant have not been announced. Harris remains a respected member of the Albuquerque entrepreneurial community, he helps to advocate for marginalized people. One such example is his support for Hugs4Hearts, helping get life-saving heart surgery to children with down syndrome.

== Former menu and reception ==
Tim's Place used to serve breakfast, lunch, and free hugs. Their menu contained American and New Mexican cuisine including, huevos rancheros served with red/green chile and blue/yellow corn tortillas, country fried steak, green chile grits, green chile burger dubbed "The New Mexican", enchiladas, green chile stew, and green chile cheese french fries.

The restaurant was well-received on Yelp and Urbanspoon. It received a positive reviews from the Weekly Alibi and Gil's Thrilling (And Filling) Blog.
