= List of breweries in New Mexico =

Breweries in New Mexico produce a wide range of beers in different styles that are marketed locally and regionally. Brewing companies vary widely in the volume and variety of beer produced, from small nanobreweries and microbreweries to massive multinational conglomerate macrobreweries.

In 2012 New Mexico's 35 brewing establishments (including breweries, brewpubs, importers, and company-owned packagers and wholesalers) employed 90 people directly, and more than 6,400 others in related jobs such as wholesaling and retailing. Altogether 34 people in New Mexico had active brewer permits in 2012.

Including people directly employed in brewing, as well as those who supply New Mexico's breweries with everything from ingredients to machinery, the total business and personal tax revenue generated by New Mexico's breweries and related industries was more than $131 million. Consumer purchases of New Mexico's brewery products generated more than $69 million extra in tax revenue. In 2012, according to the Brewers Association, New Mexico ranked 12th in the number of craft breweries per capita with 27.

For context, at the end of 2013 there were 2,822 breweries in the United States, including 2,768 craft breweries subdivided into 1,237 brewpubs, 1,412 microbreweries and 119 regional craft breweries. In that same year, according to the Beer Institute, the brewing industry employed around 43,000 Americans in brewing and distribution and had a combined economic impact of more than $246 billion.

== Historic breweries ==
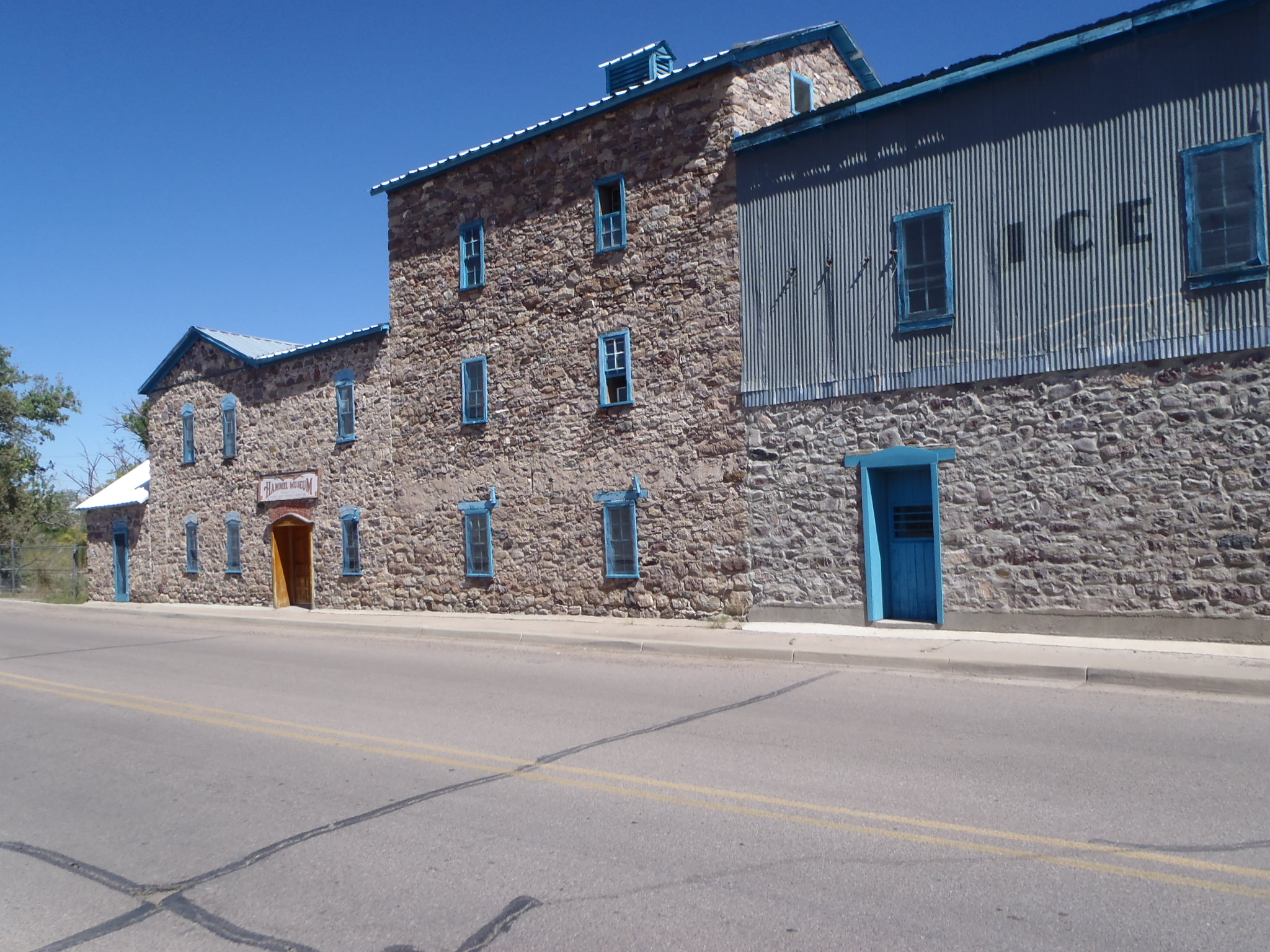
The Illinois Brewery in Socorro

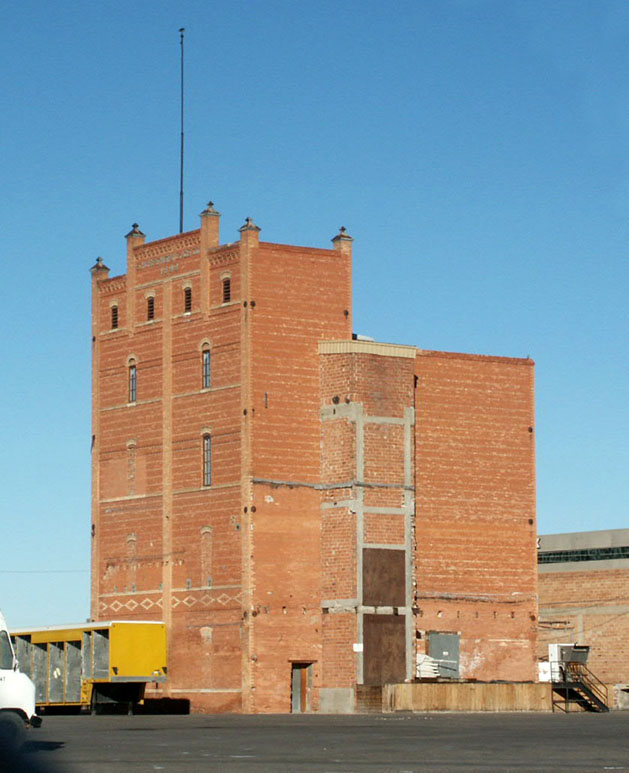
The Southwestern Brewery in Albuquerque

Breweries operated in various New Mexico towns during the late 1800s, though few survived until statewide Prohibition began in 1918. Some of the more notable breweries include:

- Illinois Brewing Company (1882–1918) in Socorro. The company started as a liquor wholesaler before moving into brewing in the mid-1880s. After Prohibition, the company continued to produce ice and soft drinks until 1965. The former brewery is listed on the National Register of Historic Places and currently operates as a museum.
- Southwestern Brewery and Ice Company (1888–1918) in Albuquerque. The brewery made various beers including the well-known Glorieta brand. The company did not return to brewing after Prohibition but continued to produce ice until 1997. The 1899 brewery building is still standing and is listed on the National Register of Historic Places.
- New Mexico Brewing Company (1936–37) in Albuquerque. This was the only brewery to open in the post-Prohibition era, though it failed after less than a year. The brewery was auctioned and reopened as Rio Grande Brewing Company (1937–39). Also a short-lived venture, its products included Rio Grande Lager. The brewery building at 2nd and Marquette was converted to residential units and is still standing.

== Breweries by location ==
=== Northern New Mexico ===
- Abbey Brewing Company in Abiquiú
- Bathtub Row Brewing Co-op in Los Alamos
- Red River Brewing Company in Red River

==== Santa Fe ====
- Keeping Together Brewery and Beverage Garden
- Rowley Farmhouse Ales
- Santa Fe Brewing Company
- Second Street Brewery

=== Central New Mexico ===
==== Albuquerque ====
- Bombs Away Beer Company
- Bosque Brewing Company
- Bow & Arrow Brewing Company
- Boxing Bear Brewing Company
- Canteen Brewhouse (formerly Il Vicino Brewing Company) (additional taproom in Santa Fe)
- Dialogue Brewing and Gallery
- Dripline Brewery
- Flock of Moons
- Gravity Bound Brewing Company
- High & Dry Brewing Company
- JUNO
- La Cumbre Brewing Company
- La Reforma
- Marble Brewery
- Nexus Brewery and Restaurant
- Ponderosa Brewing Company
- Quarter Celtic Brewpub
- Rio Bravo Brewing Company
- Sidetrack Brewing Company
- Steel Bender Brewyard
- Thirsty Eye Brewing Company
- Tractor Brewing Company

==== Corrales ====
- Ex Novo Brewing Company

==== Rio Rancho ====
- Turtle Mountain Brewing

=== Southern New Mexico ===
==== Alamogordo ====
- 575 Brewing Company

==== Las Cruces ====
- Icebox Brewing Company
- High Desert Brewing
- Spotted Dog Brewery
- Picacho Peak Brewing Company

==== Silver City ====
- Little Toad Creek Brewery
- Open Space Brewing

== See also ==
- Beer in the United States
- List of breweries in the United States
- List of microbreweries
- List of wineries in New Mexico
