= Mac's Steak in the Rough =

U.S. fast food restaurant in Albuquerque, New Mexico

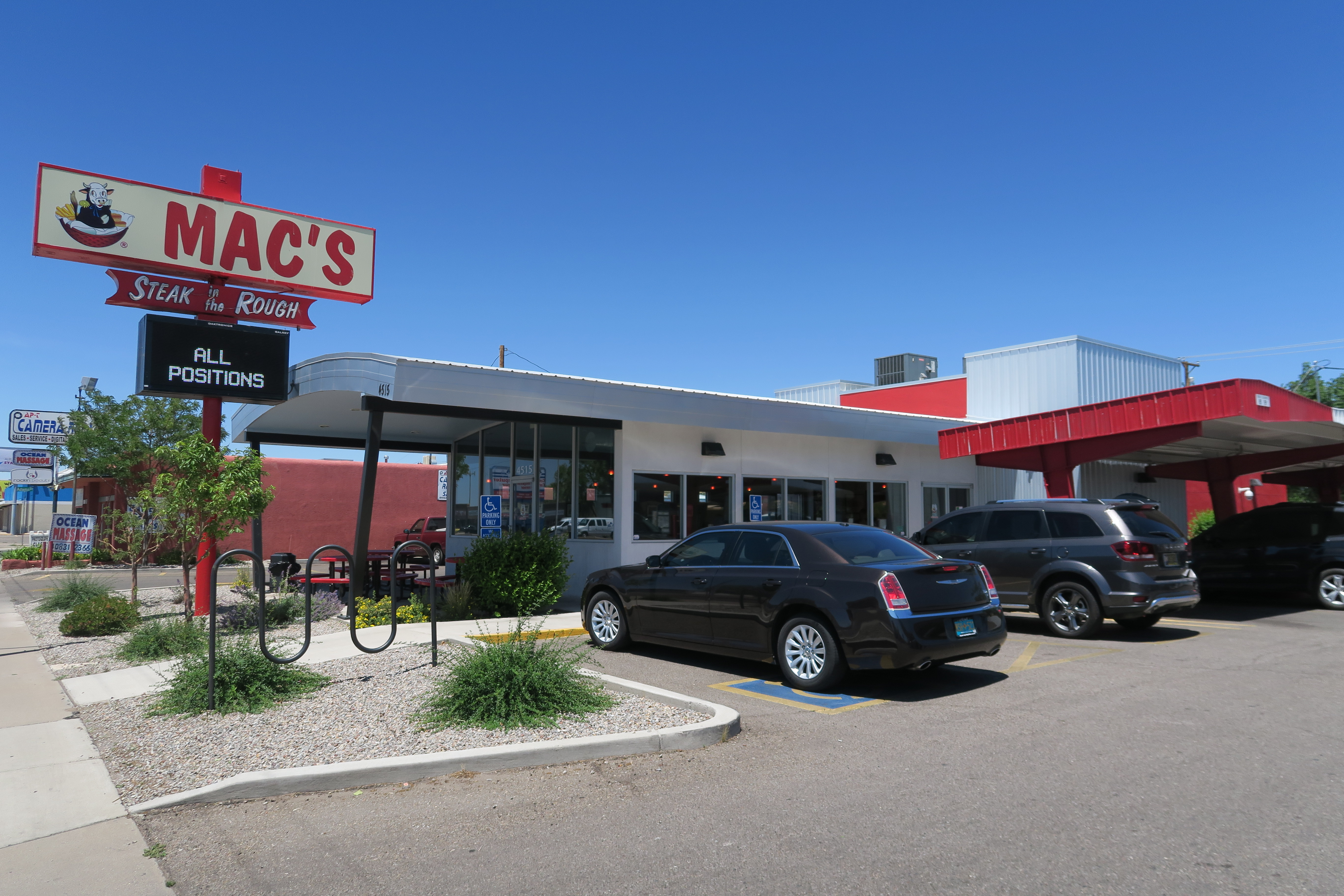
- Mac's Steak in the Rough
- Interactive map of Mac's Steak in the Rough

Restaurant information
- Established: 1949
- Owner: Fresquez Companies
- Dress code: Casual
- Location: 4515 Menaul Blvd NE, Albuquerque, New Mexico, 87110, United States
- Coordinates: 35.1093399°N 106.593325°W
- Website: macsnm.com

Mac's Steak in the Rough is a drive-in fast-food restaurant in Albuquerque, New Mexico, that serves American and New Mexican cuisine. It used to be a chain of restaurants throughout New Mexico, but their locations were reduced to a single restaurant. however in 2012 they expanded again by opening a second location inside the Latitudes gas station near the entrance of Intel in Rio Rancho. However, this location closed in 2023, returning the restaurant to just one location on Menaul Boulevard.

== History ==
Started in 1949 by Jasper McCarty in Portales, New Mexico. They opened their first Albuquerque restaurant in the 1960s. David McCarty inherited the restaurant chain in the late 1970's. They are now owned by the New Mexico-based company, Fresquez Companies.

== Today ==
The restaurant continues to sell its "steak in the rough", which is deep-fried steak fingers with french fries and white gravy, which come with a green onion.

== Reception ==
The restaurant was selected as one of the best drive-in restaurants in the United States by Thrillist.
