= Santa Fe Brewing Company =

Brewery in New Mexico

Coordinates: 35.59634°N 106.05207°W

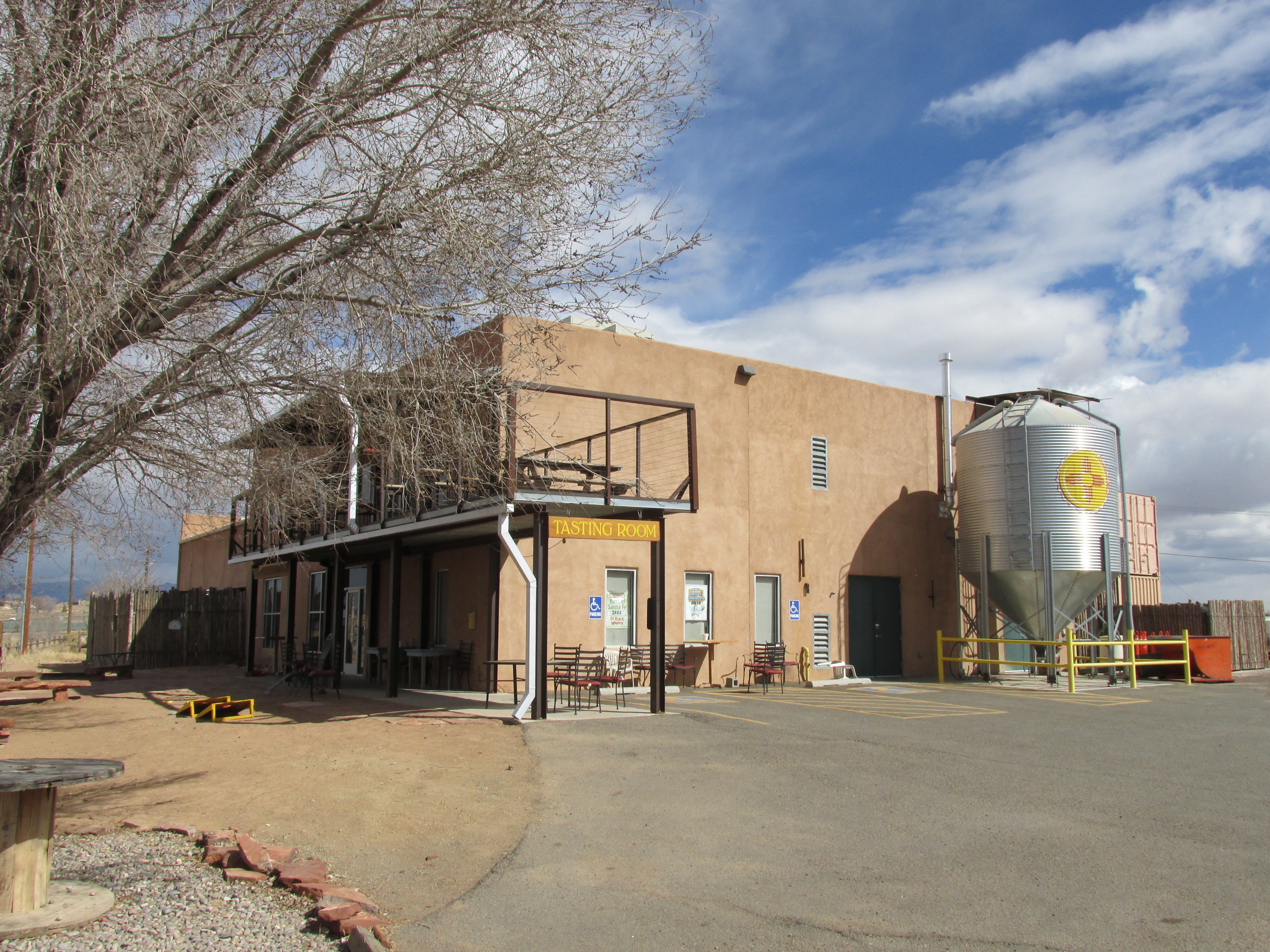
- Industry: Alcoholic beverage
- Founded: 1988
- Headquarters: Santa Fe, New Mexico, USA
- Products: Beer
- Production output: 17,000 US barrels (2013)
- Owner: Brian Lock
- Website: https://santafebrewing.com

Santa Fe Brewing Company is a brewery located in Santa Fe, New Mexico. It was established in 1988 as New Mexico's first craft brewery and has since become the largest brewery in the state. Its beers are distributed throughout the Southwestern United States. In 2010, Santa Fe Brewing became the first brewery in New Mexico to produce canned beer.

== History ==
The brewery was founded by Michael Levis in 1988. In 1996, Levis sold the business to a partnership formed by his son Ty along with Dave Forester, Brian Lock, and Carlos Muller. Lock bought out the other three partners in 2003 to become the sole owner. In 2005, Santa Fe Brewing moved its operations to a much larger facility, the former Wolf Canyon Brewery near Interstate 25. This doubled the brewery's capacity from 15 barrels to 30 barrels, and annual production increased from 1,750 barrels in 2004 to 6,000 barrels in 2007.

In 2010, Santa Fe Brewing began offering its Freestyle Pilsner and Happy Camper IPA in cans, becoming the first brewery in New Mexico to do so.

== See also ==
- List of breweries in New Mexico
- List of microbreweries
