= M. & J. Sanitary Tortilla Factory =

Building in Albuquerque, New Mexico, US

Bea Montoya inside M&J's Sanitary Tortilla Factory

M & J Sanitary Tortilla Factory is a historical tortilla factory and restaurant in Downtown Albuquerque, New Mexico, located near the historic Barelas Neighborhood. They closed in 2004.

In 1984, The New Yorker featured a profile article on M & J's at the time when Beatrice Montoya was the proprietor. Montoya was honored by the local Hispanic Chamber of Commerce. Montoya's husband, Jake, supervised the manufacturing of the tortilla-making machinery; he also served as the co-proprietor. Having been established in the 1930s by the original owners, Mary and Jesse DeSoto, the factory and restaurant changed ownership in the 1970s to the Montoya family, who operated it for over 30 years. According to the artist Tina Fuentes and the band Yo La Tengo, M. & J.'s "fed and supported artists while filling their plates and hearts."

The building was later turned into an art space in 2015 by Albuquerque-based artist Sheri Crider, similarly named the Sanitary Tortilla Factory, to create opportunities for emerging artists and as a platform to address societal issues.

== History ==
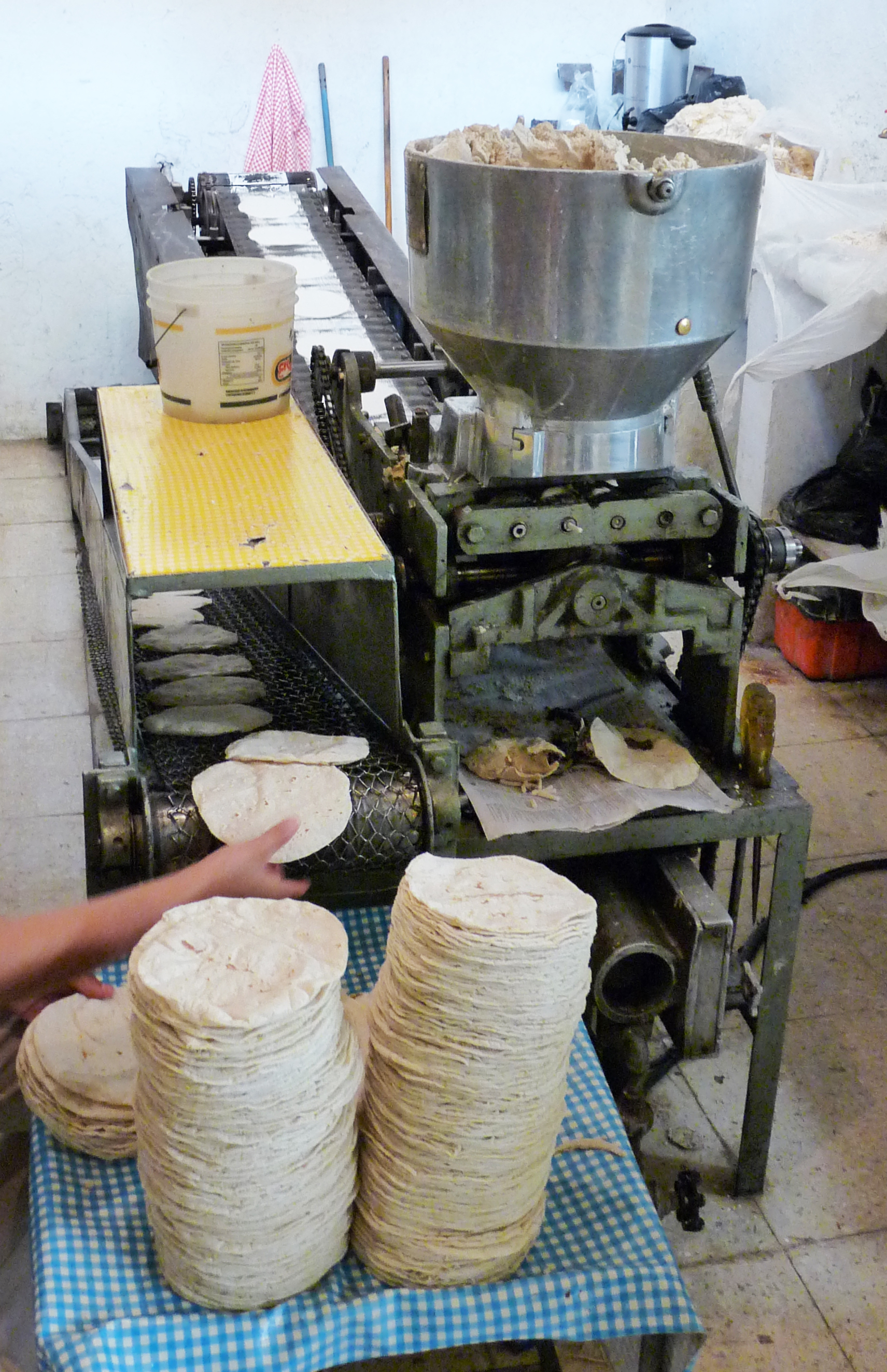
An example of a tortilla-making machine

The legacy of the M. & J. Sanitary Tortilla Factory in the 400 block of Second Street SW dates back to its heyday as a culinary cornerstone of New Mexican cuisine in Albuquerque, New Mexico. The building is located a few blocks from the intersection of the historic Route 66 (Central Avenue) and the Santa Fe Railroad that parallels Second Street.

There are several accounts of the original owners of the establishment. Some sources state that the original owners were Eloisa Baca and Salomon DeSoto, who opened both the Sanitary Tortilla Factory and the El Comedor restaurant in 1930. Other reports state that the first owner was Jesus Hernandez, who named it after his daughter-in-law Mary and his son, Jesse DeSoto. However, yet other sources claim Mary and Jesse DeSoto originally established the business in the 1930s; the DeSotos owned the first mechanical tortilla-making device in Albuquerque. At that time, machine-made tortillas were thought to be more sanitary than handmade tortillas. The name M. & J. comes from the initials of their first names. Following the DeSotos, another owner took over the factory for 20 years. In 1972, the Belen News Bulletin reported that Charlie Maes was the owner.

In 1974, the Montoya family purchased the business, and between 1974 and 2004, Beatrice Montoya was the proprietor. She was honored by the local Hispanic Chamber of Commerce and recognized as a judge in chile-making contests. The factory produced several traditional foods such as tostadas and sopaipillas and chile rellenos. The tortilla-making machinery was managed by Jake Montoya, Beatrice's husband and co-proprietor. Several local restaurants, schools, and homes in Albuquerque served their food. The factory ground their own corn to make masa for their homemade tortillas. The Montoya's daughter Eileen was a co-owner until the time of her death in 1995. During the time the Montoya's owned the business, he factory was known for its Five-Hongo Burrito, which earned it the Ultra Supremo Burrito Rating for the State of New Mexico on the PM Magazine TV show.

The restaurant was popular with local people from the neighborhood, including office workers and artists, who had studios nearby. The South Second Street Coalition of Artists held art shows there. M. & J.'s was known for their "funky" art collection that included pictures of saints and school children's drawings as well as contemporary art. The interior white stucco walls were hung with chile ristras and garlic bulbs as protection from "evil spirits"; an open Bible was presented on a table surrounded by candles. The walls were covered with paintings from local artists who bartered for meals with their artwork. Bea experimented with her recipes to perfect them. She said, "I pray to God to bless all my food. The homeless are my guardian angels."

The restaurant has been written about in several books, The New Yorker, The New York Times, and Cosmopolitan magazine. The Montoyas closed the business due to rent increases in the area; when it closed, Bea Montoya said, "I've died a 100 times today" and stated that she did not plan to reopen at a different location.

=== Reuse of building ===
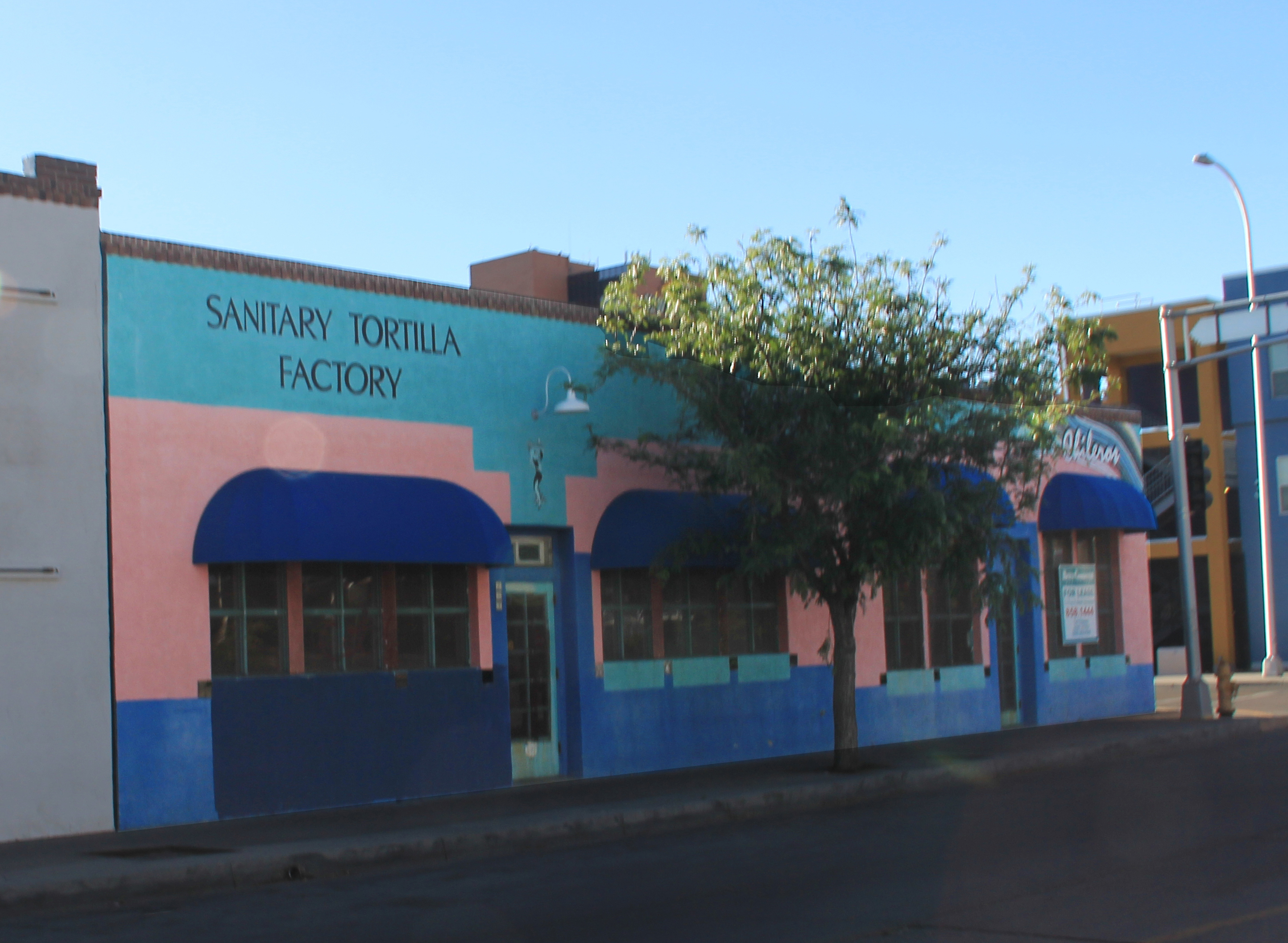
Façade of Sanitary Tortilla Factory art space

After M. & J. closed the business in 2004, the space was occupied by Los Chileros, a food and spice manufacturing operation that ran their business there until 2012. Following that, the building remained vacant until 2015.

In 2015, after operating as a tortilla factory for many decades and later as a food and spice factory, the building was repurposed by the artist Sheri Crider, who converted the space into a gallery and artists studios. The gallery retained part of the name, Sanitary Tortilla Factory. The venue includes studio space/artist in residence program and a gallery. The venue serves as an exhibition space for work with a focus on criminal justice reform, community engagement and social equity.

A selection of shows hosted by the gallery include: Eric-Paul Riege, dah ‘iistł’ǫ́ [loomz], a Diné weaver and performance artist, Black Hole/Atomic City (State of Decay), on New Mexico's nuclear weapons history, The Alchemical Trace: Transformation and Resilience in Recent Works by LGBTQIA Artists, Interior Landscapes, held in conjunction with an exhibition at 516 Gallery titled The U.S.-Mexico Border: Place, Imagination, and Possibility. A posthumous show of the work of Valerie Roybal, Amo Ergo Sum, I Love Therefore I Am was presented in 2019. among others.
