= Pine City, New York =

- Hamlet
- Location within the state of New York
- Coordinates: 42°02′14″N 76°52′12″W
- Country: United States
- State: New York
- County: Chemung

Population (2000)
  - Total: 5,220
  - Density: 93/sq mi (36/km^{2})
- Time zone: UTC-5 (Eastern (EST))
  - Summer (DST): UTC-4 (EDT)
- ZIP code: 14871
- Area code: 607

Pine City is a hamlet located in Chemung County, New York, United States. The population was 5,220 at the 2000 census. There is a post office there.

== History ==
Mount Saviour Monastery was added to the National Register of Historic Places in 2015.

== See also ==
- Peanut (squirrel) – American pet (c. 2017–2024)
