= Bosque Brewing Company =

Microbrewery in New Mexico, U.S.

Coordinates: 35°4′48.8″N 106°36′47.1″W

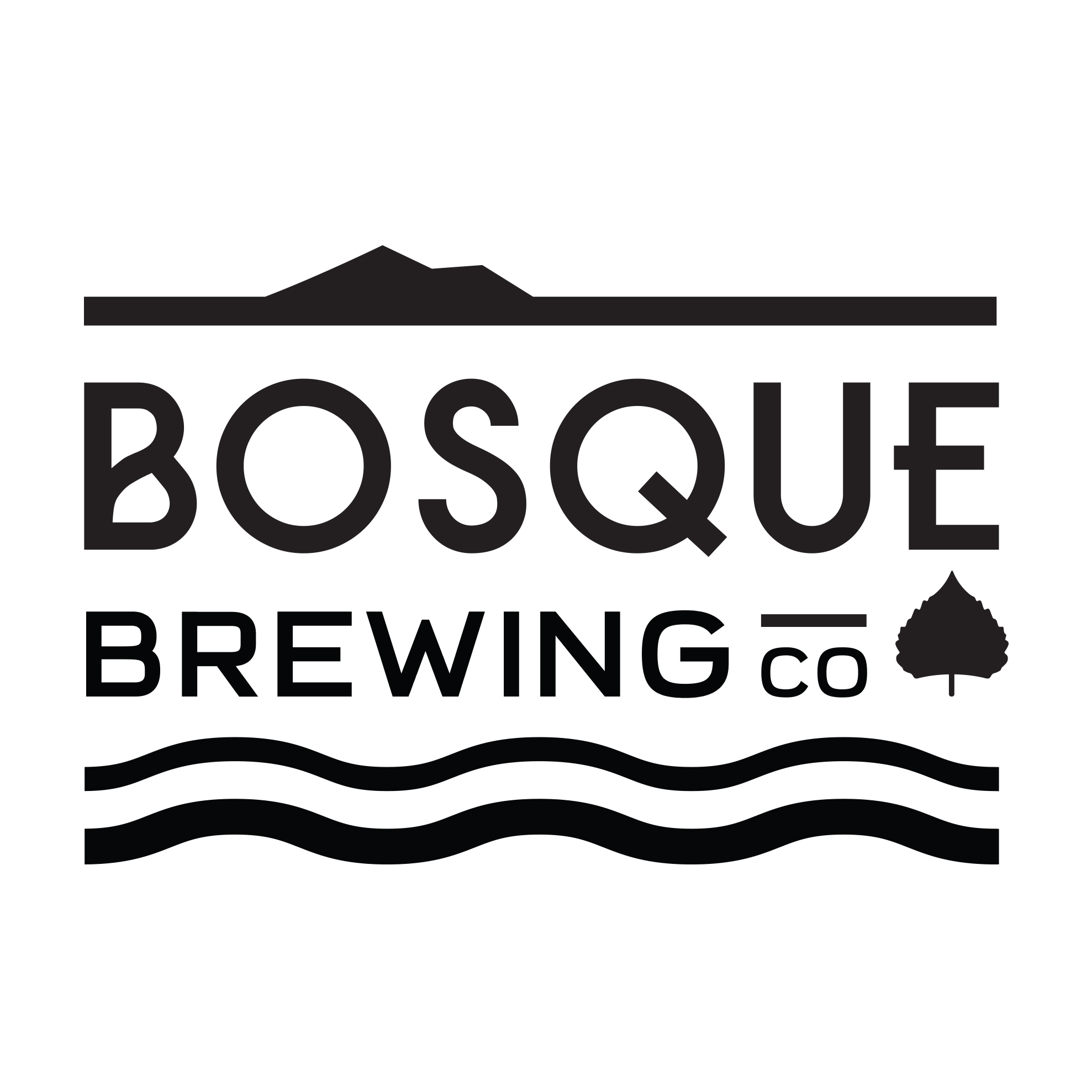
- Interactive map of Bosque Brewing Company
- Location: Albuquerque, New Mexico; Bernalillo, New Mexico; Las Cruces, New Mexico; Santa Fe, New Mexico
- Opened: 2012
- Annual production volume: 10,168 bbls (2017)
- Owner: Gabe Jensen, Jotham Michnovicz, Jess Griego, John Bullard, Kevin Jameson, and Jared Michnovicz
- Website: bosquebrewing.com

Active beers
Name	Type
Salt Money	Lager
1888	Blonde Ale
Elephants on Parade	Fruited Wheat
Riverwalker IPA	IPA
Beyond the Trees	Cider
Scotia	Scotch Ale
Weekend Trails	Pale Ale

Seasonal beers
Name	Type
Scale Tipper IPA	Special IPA
Acequia Wet Hop IPA	Special IPA

Bosque Brewing Company is a microbrewery based in New Mexico with taprooms in Albuquerque and Las Cruces. The company produces beers inspired by American and European-style traditions that are distributed throughout the state of New Mexico.

== History ==
Co-Founders Gabe Jensen, Jotham Michnovicz, and Kevin Jameson began Bosque Brewing Company to design and produce high-quality, flavorful beers while creating jobs and contributing to the local economy and community. The partners started their initial recipe development in 2010 with full-scale brewing operations beginning in 2012, then opening for business in October 2012 at the original taproom on San Mateo Boulevard in Albuquerque. They crafted six original house styles as year-round offerings with a few rotating specialty beers.

After celebrating the company's first anniversary, Bosque moved into an aggressive growth phase, including multiple expansions in facilities, staff, and equipment. John Bullard joined Bosque Brewing in March 2014 as Brewmaster and Director of Brewing Operations. As an award-winning head brewer before joining the company, Bullard refined recipes and significantly expanded the company's standard and specialty offerings. The company's second location opened in November 2014 across from New Mexico State University in Las Cruces. One month later, the third location opened on the border of the Nob Hill Business District and the University of New Mexico area in Albuquerque. Finally, distribution quickly expanded into more than 150 restaurants and retail outlets across New Mexico.

In October 2025, the brewery filed for Chapter 11 bankruptcy protection due to mounting debt and liabilities.

== Awards ==
Great American Beer Festival

=== Great American Beer Festival ===
Awards from the Great American Beer Festival:

- 2014: Acequia Wet Hop IPA, Bronze Medal Winner, Fresh or Wet Hop Ale
- 2015: Acequia Wet Hop IPA, Gold Medal Winner, Fresh or Wet Hop Ale

=== Brewing News IPA Championship ===
- 2015: Scale Tipper IPA, NIPAC Champion
- 2016: Scale Tipper IPA, NIPAC Champion

=== New Mexico Brewers Guild’s IPA Challenge ===
- 2015: Scale Tipper IPA, NMIPAC Winner
- 2014: Scale Tipper IPA, NMIPAC Winner

== Products ==
Bosque Brewing Company maintains six year-round offerings and six rotating specialty beers at all times. The beers produced by Bosque honor time-tested traditions while experimenting with and pioneering new techniques and recipes. Bosque's beers are available on draft at each taproom, restaurants, and bars throughout New Mexico. In addition, limited runs of bottled specialty beers are available at each taproom and select retailers throughout the state.

== See also ==
- List of breweries in New Mexico
