= Marble Brewery (Albuquerque, New Mexico) =

Coordinates: 35.0928°N 106.6468°W

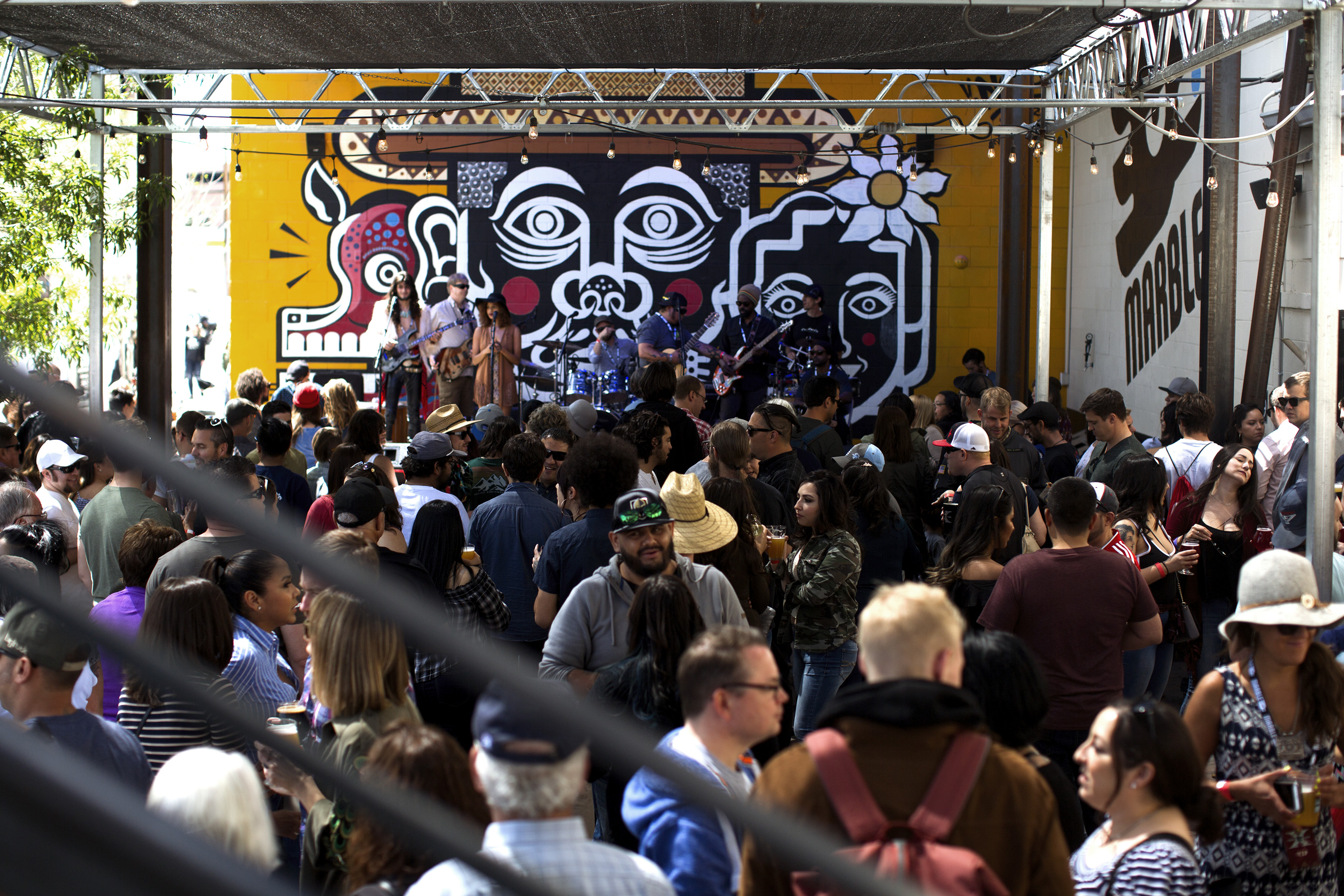
- Location: 111 Marble Ave NW; Albuquerque, New Mexico, USA
- Opened: 2008
- Annual production volume: 23,000 US barrels (2018)

Marble Brewery is a brewery in Albuquerque, New Mexico, founded in 2008. Its main brewhouse is located in downtown Albuquerque on Marble Avenue, which gave the brewery its name. The 30 barrel brewhouse is responsible for brewing all classic and seasonal styles, including Marble's most popular brew, Double White. As of 2018, it was the second largest brewery in New Mexico with an annual production volume of 23,000 US barrels. In 2016, the brewery completed a major expansion which increased the production capacity to 30,000 barrels. Its beers have won several awards and it was named Small Brewery and Brewmaster of the Year at the 2014 Great American Beer Festival.

The brewery operates two satellite taprooms in the Northeast Heights and on the West Side in addition to its main brewery and taproom downtown. Marble also previously operated a taproom in Santa Fe, but it was closed in 2015. The Northeast Heights location is also home to the Mav Lab which houses a 10bbl brewhouse and creates a constant stream of specials that are distributed to all three taprooms.

Marble currently employs over 100 people across its two breweries and three taprooms.

== Beers ==
As of 2019, Marble Brewery produces ten main year-round beers:

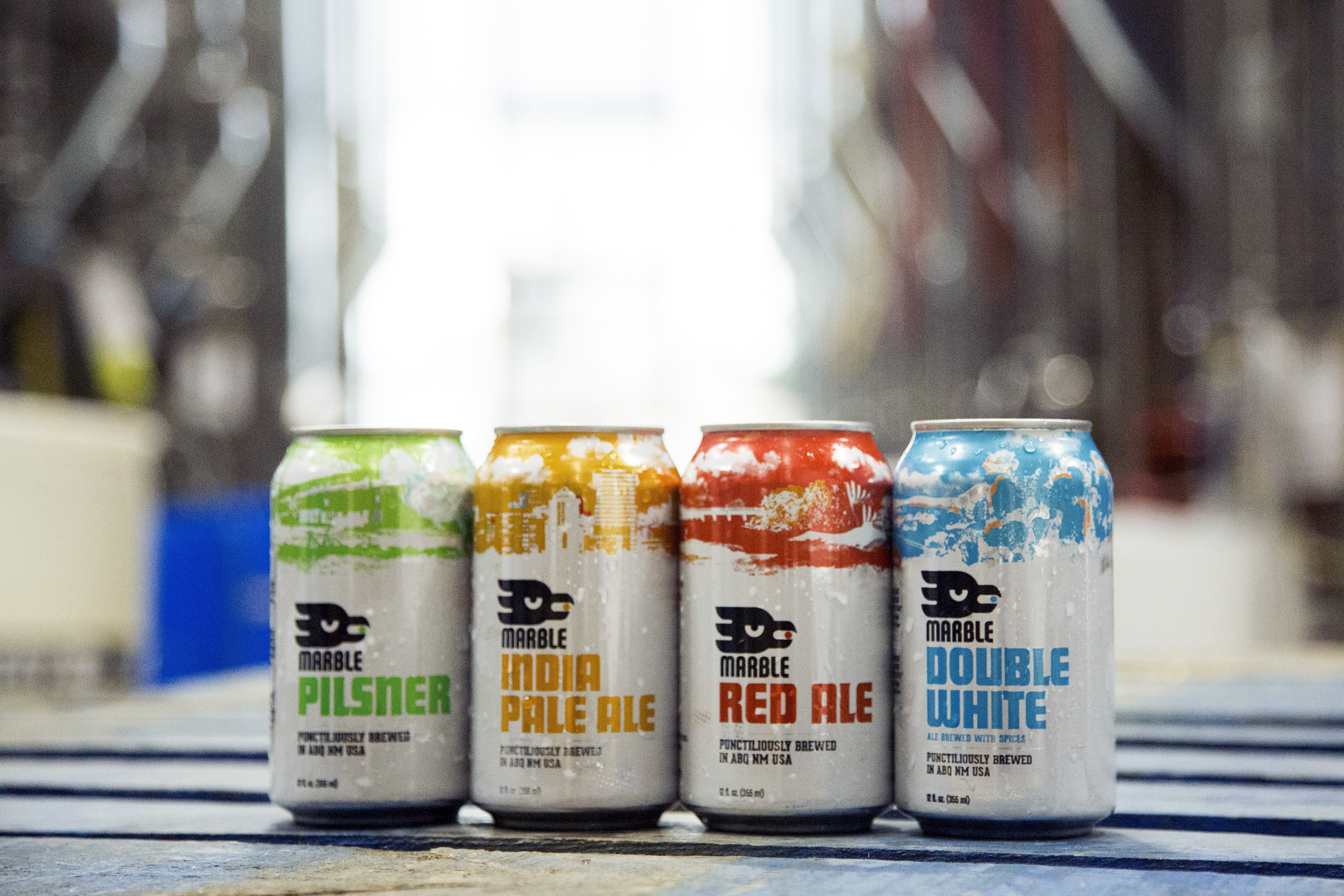

- Double White - A delicate, dry, pale & hazy Belgian-inspired wheat ale accented with traditional spices. 7.0%ABV
- India Pale Ale - Our favorite hops deliver a fragrant citrus aroma & snappy hop character to this eminently quaffable IPA. 6.8%ABV
- Red Ale - Bursting with Pacific Northwest hops, balanced by a blend of caramel & toasted malts. 6.5%ABV
- Pilsner - Dry hopped and unfiltered, this interpretation of a German classic is floral, spicy and crisp. 4.7%ABV
- Wildflower Wheat - An unfiltered American Wheat Ale accented with NM wildflower honey. Our "liquid sopapilla." 5.6%ABV
- Oatmeal Stout - A stout brewed with flaked oats & a blend of 3 roasted malts, with a creamy texture & dark notes of espresso & chocolate. 5.8%ABV
- Cholo Stout - This all-sick stout rides low & slow with a dark blend of roasted malts & bounces high with a pop of bright PNW hops. 6.9%ABV
- DIPA - A barrage of juicy, resinous hop character pounces from the lean malt base of this deep golden-colored DIPA. 8.0%ABV
- Desert Fog - A hazy IPA featuring the juicy scent of orange, pineapple and grapefruit. 7.2%ABV
- Passionate Gose - Fantastically fruity & bright, this sour ale is seasoned with passion fruit & a hint of salt. 4.8%ABV

Marble also produces a number of special and seasonal beers. Marble operates canning, bottling, and kegging lines on-site and distributes its products to bars and retail locations throughout New Mexico, Arizona, Southwest Texas, and Southwest Colorado.

== Awards ==
Marble Brewery has won 11 medals at the Great American Beer Festival between 2011 and 2017. They were awarded the Best Small Brewery and Small Brewery Brewer in 2014. The "Double White" has received a Bronze Medal in 2012 and a Gold Medal in 2014 in the Other Strong Beer category. The "Imperial Red" has won a Silver Medal in 2012, a Gold in 2014, and a Bronze in 2015 in the Imperial Red category. They won a Bronze Medal for the “Thunder from Dortmunder” in 2013 in the Dortmunder category. The "Pilsner" has received a Bronze Medal in 2011 and a Silver in 2013 in the German Style Pilsner category and Bronze Medals in 2016 and 2017 in the Kellerbier or Zwickelbier category.

At the World Beer Cup, the "Pilsner" was awarded Gold in 2014 and Bronze in 2016 in the Kellerbier or Zwickelbier category.

In 2017, they won the GABF Gold for Cholo Stout, which spearheaded its year-round release and addition to Marble's list of "classic" styles.

== Gallery ==
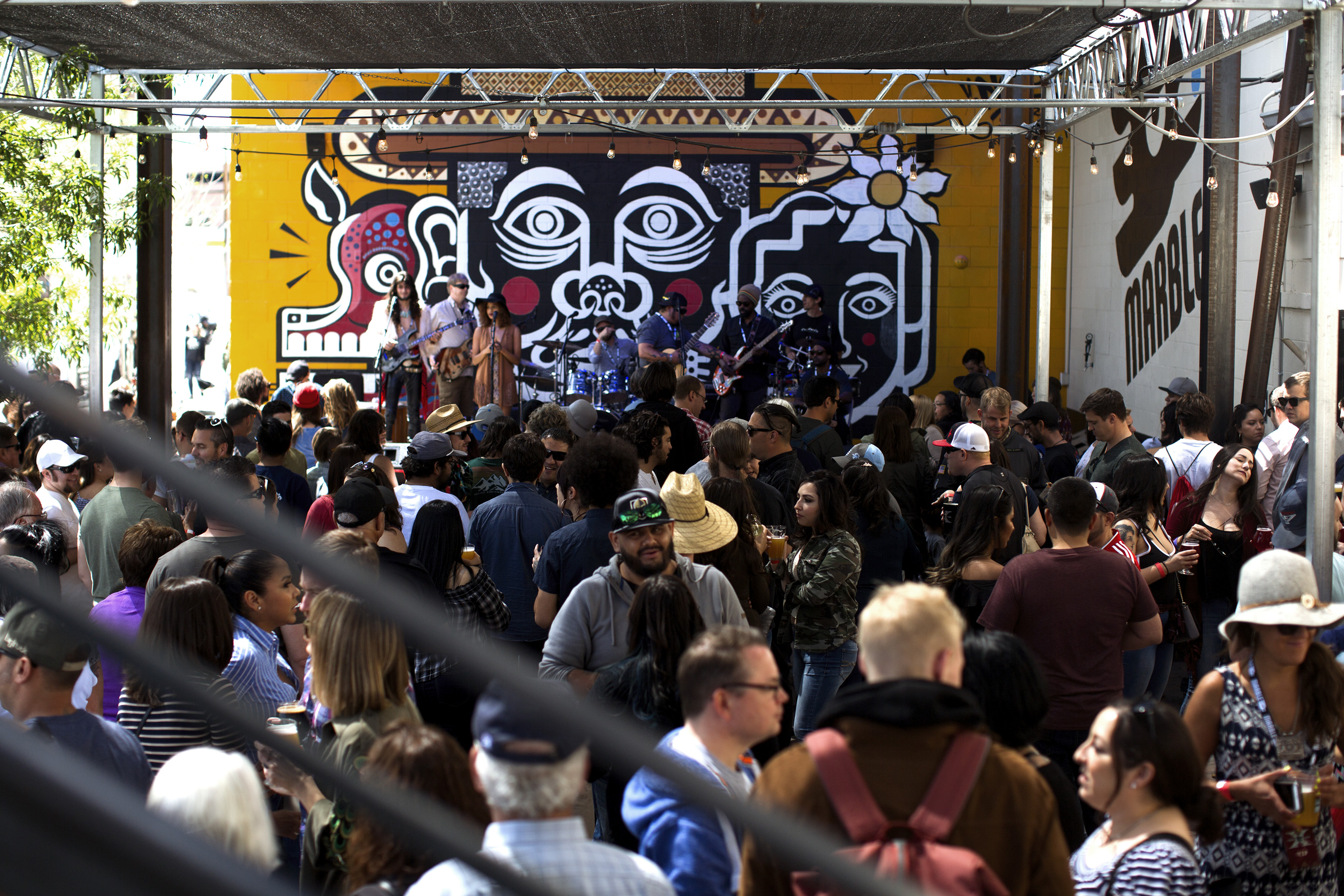
10-Year Anniversary Street Party, 2018

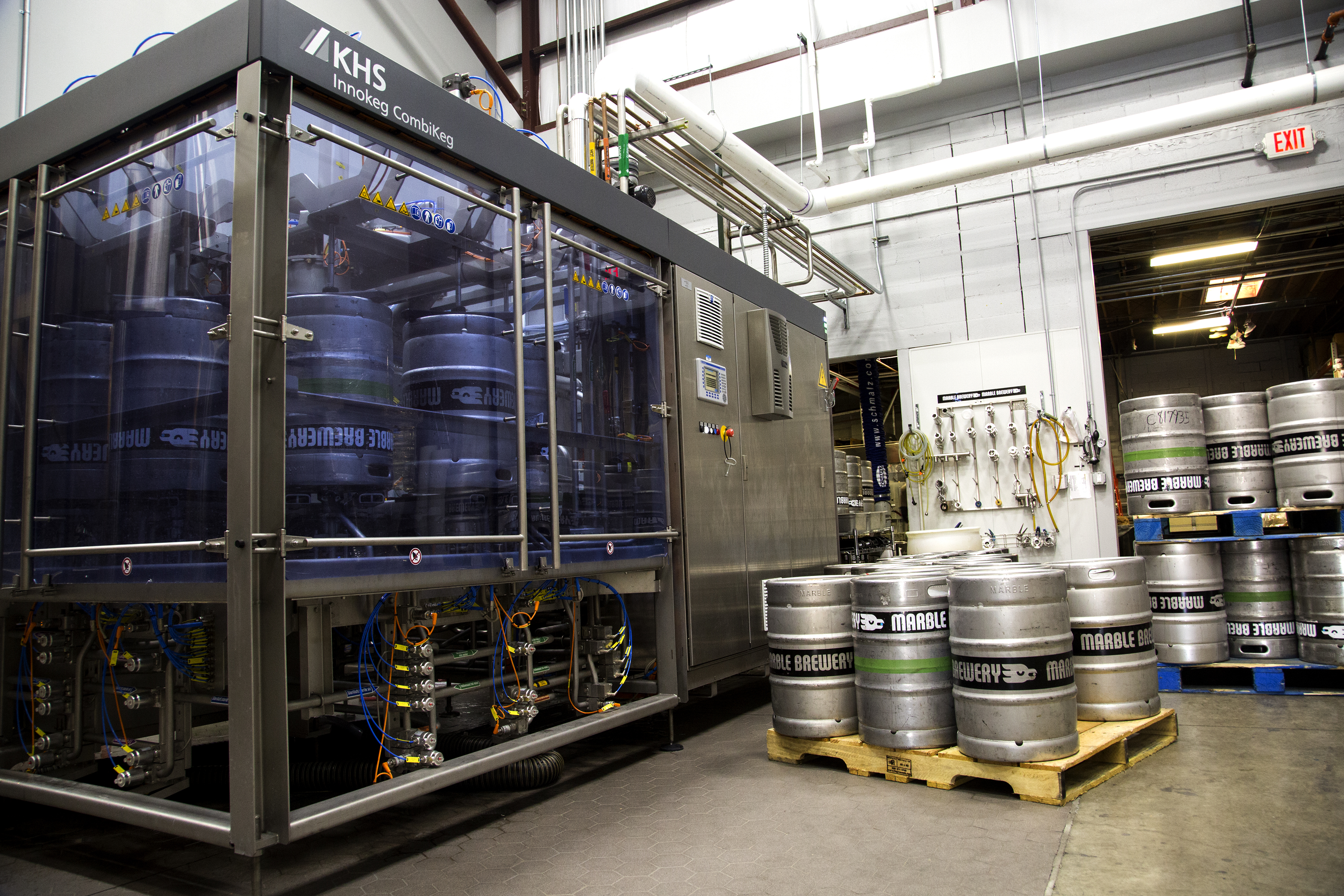

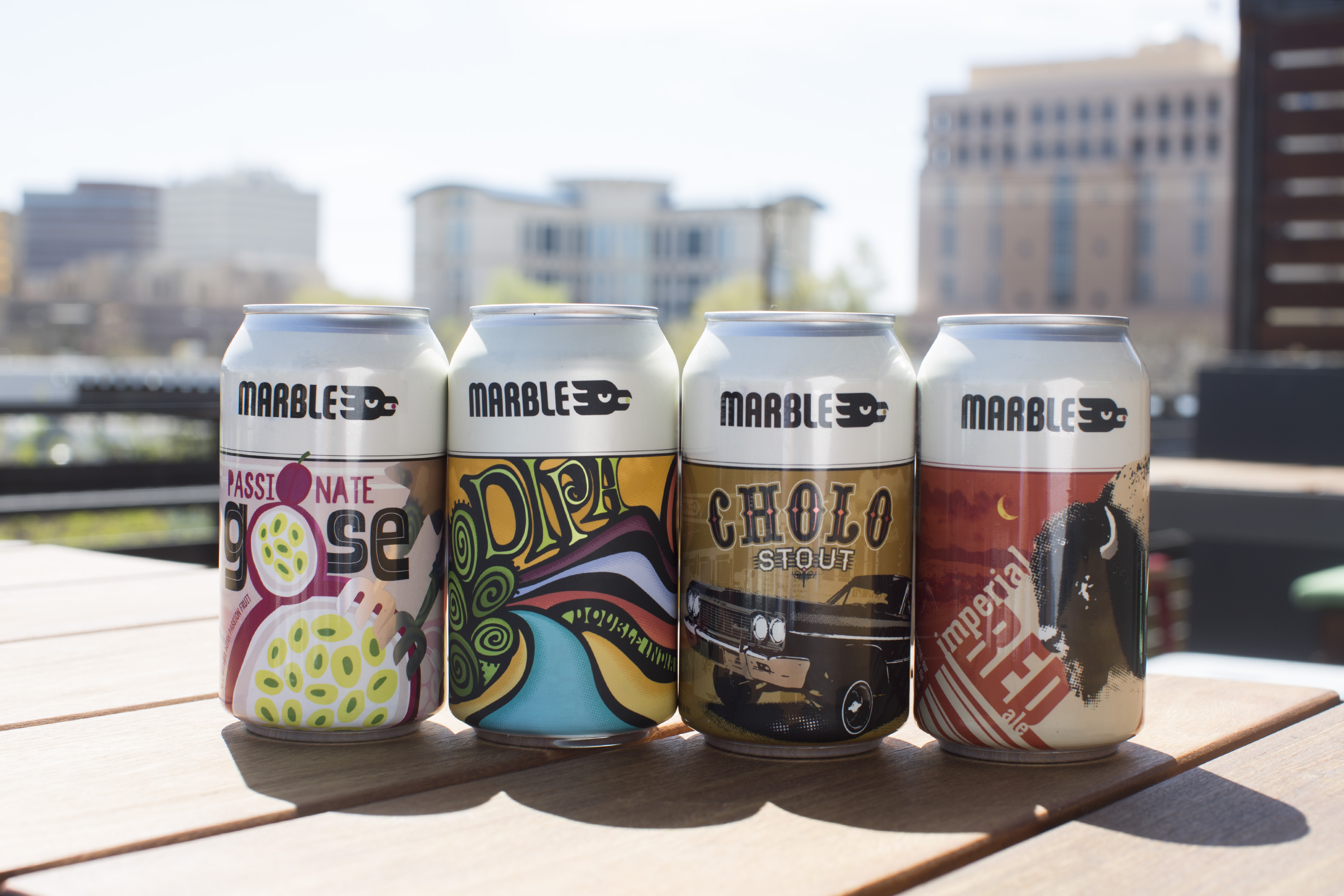

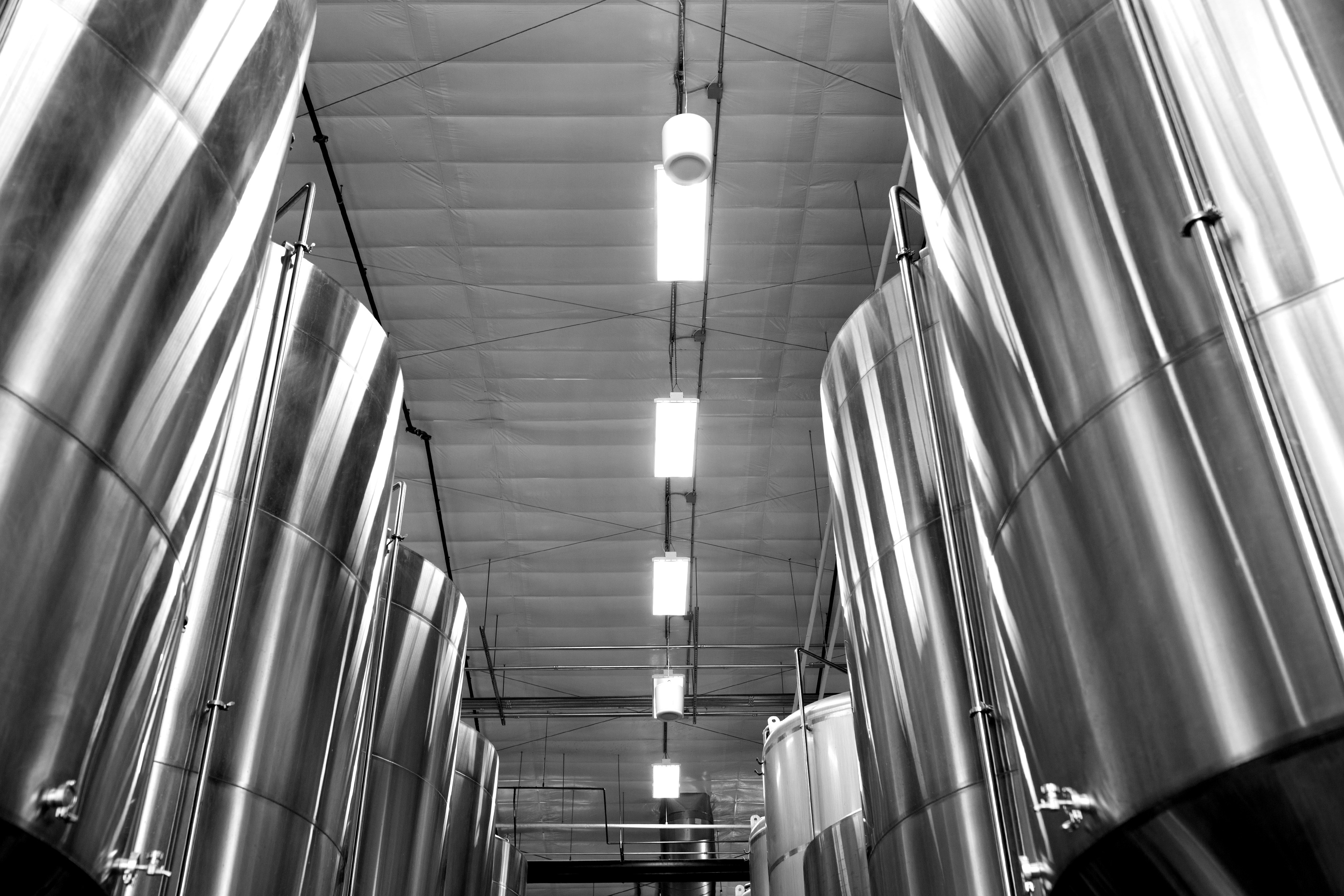

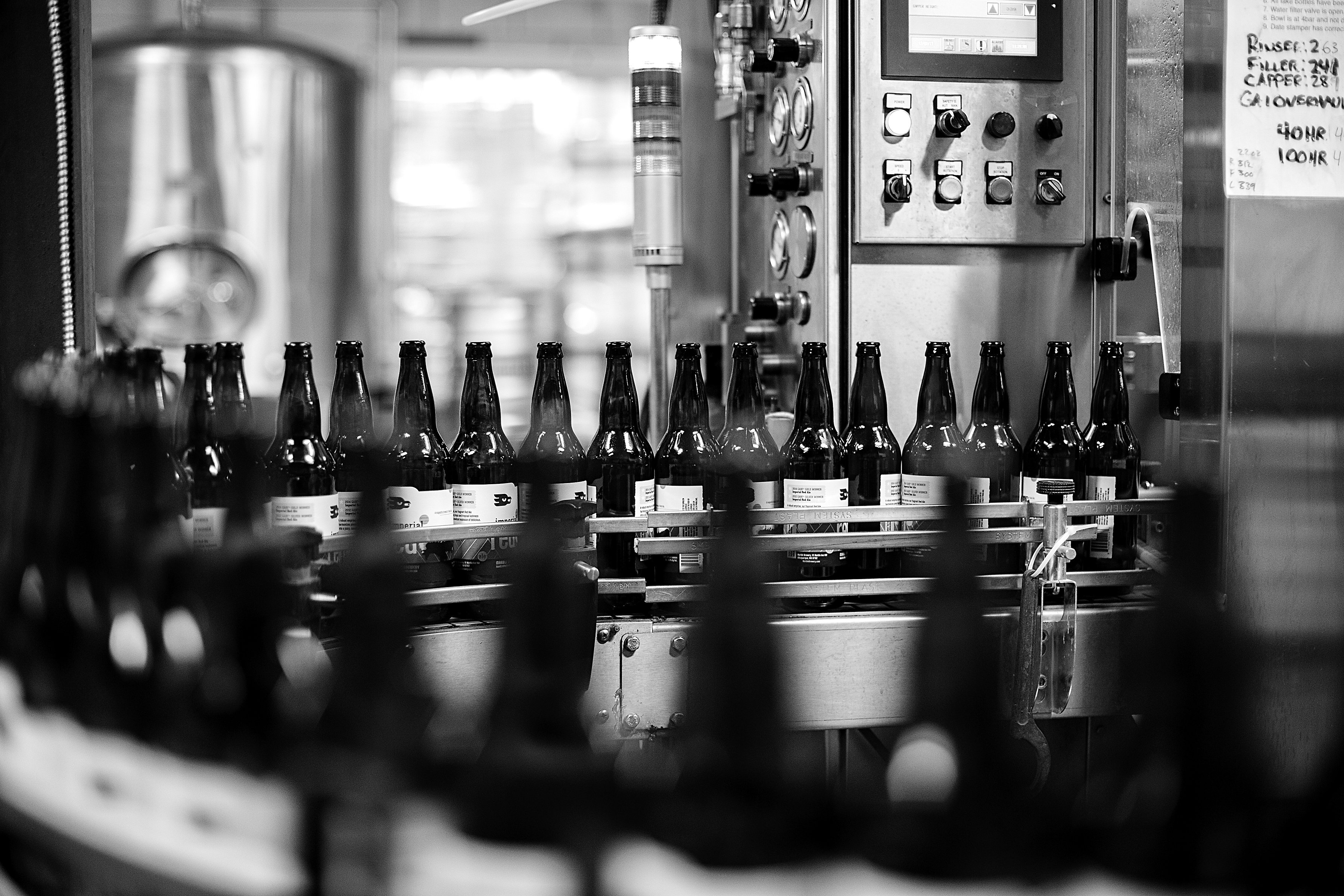

== See also ==
- Albuquerque craft beer market
- List of breweries in New Mexico
- List of microbreweries
- New Mexico Brewer's Guild
