= Tractor Brewing Company =

Brewery based in New Mexico

- Location: 1800 4th St NW; Albuquerque, New Mexico, US
- Coordinates: 35.0824099°N 106.6764794°W
- Opened: 1999
- Key people: David Hargis (brewmaster); Skye Devore (beer goddess)
- Annual production volume: ca.4,000 US beer barrels (4,700 hL) (2014)
- Website: getplowed.com

Active beers
Name	Type
Double Plow Oatmeal Stout	English-style stout
Farmer's Almanac IPA	India Pale Ale
Farmer's Tan Red Ale	Hybrid Irish red/Scotch ale
Haymaker Honey Wheat	American wheat ale
Milk Mustachio Stout	Milk stout
#15 Pilsner	German-style lager
Sod Buster Pale Ale	American pale ale

Seasonal beers
Name	Type
Tractoberfest	Euro-style amber lager
Tractor Maibock	Helles bock
Winter IPA	India Pale Ale

Other beers
Name	Type
Javier Lager	Premium lager
Wagon Wine	American barley wine

Tractor Brewing Company is a New Mexico–based brewery, founded in 1999 in Los Lunas and since 2014 located in Albuquerque. Tractor beers have won awards at the New Mexico State Fair Pro-Am Competition.

The brewery, including a taproom and restaurant, is located just north of downtown Albuquerque and there is an additional taproom in Albuquerque's Nob Hill neighborhood near the University of New Mexico. Tractor is known for featuring local artists, musicians, and poetry slams.

== History ==
Tractor Brewing was conceived in 1999 as a "beer farm" by Herb Pluemer. It was initially established in the rural community of Los Lunas, New Mexico. Pluemer restored vintage tractors and placed them around his brew house, attracting customers. The brewery bottled its product and it was distributed in New Mexico, Oklahoma, New Jersey and New York.

The business had a downturn in 2008 during the Great Recession, nearly closing. The bottling operation came to a halt and Pluember brought in Skye Devore, an MBA, and new brewer David Hargis, who revitalized the company. The business grew and expansion into the Albuquerque craft beer market came in the summer of 2011, when Tractor opening a taproom in the Nob Hill neighborhood of Albuquerque. While the Nob Hill taproom does not serve food, local food trucks serve a rotation of cuisines just outside the taproom's front door.

Operating the taproom required a significant increase in production and business flourished. Then in 2013, Tractor was approached by Premier Distributing, New Mexico's largest beer distributor, about resuming bottling its beer. The combined increase in production tested the limits of the Los Lunas brewery's fifteen-barrel system. Hargis and Devore became employee-owners of the business and set about rebranding the product and solving the capacity challenge.

They decided to close down the Los Lunas brewery and open a combined brewery, taproom and restaurant just north of downtown Albuquerque. The new brewery has nine thirty-barrel and five fifteen-barrel fermenters and commenced operations in early 2014. It quickly became known for featuring local artists and musicians. Local artist, author and poet Carlos Contreras was brought on to manage art, music, poetry, and charity fundraising events.

The brewery participates in the Taos Ski Valley Annual Brew Master’s Festival and the New Mexico Brewers Guild's annual WinterBrew in Santa Fe, New Mexico, and is one of the sponsors of a 2015 bicycle sharing pilot program in downtown Albuquerque.

== Production ==
Tractor Brewing has grown from two men producing 350 barrels per year in 2008 to 80 employees producing nearly 4,000 barrels per year in 2014.

== Brews ==
=== Regular brews ===
Tractor has seven regular beers:

- Double Plow Oatmeal Stout, is a dry English-style stout with 5.2% ABV. It is made with chocolate and dark roasted malts.
- Farmer's Almanac IPA, a golden India Pale Ale with an IBU rating of 72 and 6.5% ABV.
- Farmer's Tan Red Ale, a hybrid Irish red / Scotch ale, with a 6.5% ABV (won Bronze medal at 2014 State Fair Pro-Am).
- #15 Pilsner, a German-style lager. Called #15 because it uses 15 bags of malt for a fifteen-barrel brew.
- Haymaker Honey Wheat, an American wheat ale. Each fifteen-barrel brew requires eighty pounds of local honey.
- Milk Mustachio Stout, a milk stout with 6.0% ABV.
- Sod Buster Pale Ale, an American pale ale with an IBU rating of 45.

=== Seasonal and occasional brews ===
Seasonal and occasional beers include:

- Javier Lager, a premium American lager (won Silver medal at 2014 State Fair Pro-Am).
- Tractoberfest, a European-style amber lager (won Silver medal at 2014 State Fair Pro-Am).
- Tractor ESB, extra special bitter (won Bronze medal at 2014 State Fair Pro-Am).
- Tractor Maibock, a helles bock (won Bronze medal at 2014 State Fair Pro-Am).
- Wagon Wine, an American barley wine (won Silver medal at 2014 State Fair Pro-Am).
- Winter IPA, an India Pale Ale.

== Awards ==
Tractor's Man Der Damm premium lager took first place at the 2013 New Mexico Beer Cup and was also the People's Choice and Celebrity Pick in the lager category, and their Farmer’s Tan Red Ale placed third in the red ale category.

In 2014, Tractor won three silver medals (in the light lager, European amber lager, and strong ale categories) and three bronze medals (in the bock, English pale ale, and Scottish and Irish ale categories) at the State Fair Pro-Am Competition.

== See also ==
- List of breweries in New Mexico
- List of microbreweries
