= Canteen Brewhouse =

American craft brewery in New Mexico

Coordinates: 35°7′13.6″N 106°37′4.5″W

- Industry: Alcoholic beverage
- Founded: 1994
- Founders: Greg Atkin, Tom Hennessy, Richard Post, Thomas White
- Headquarters: 2381 Aztec NE; Albuquerque, New Mexico, United States
- Products: Beer
- Website: canteenbrewhouse.com

Canteen Brewhouse (formerly Il Vicino Brewing Company) is an American craft brewery founded in 1994 in Albuquerque, New Mexico.

== History ==
Originally housed in the Albuquerque Nob Hill location of Il Vicino Wood Oven Pizza restaurant, founding partners Greg Atkin, Rick Post and Thomas White, along with former partner Tom Hennessy, currently the founder of Colorado Boy Brewing, recognized restaurant customer wishes for craft beer to go with their pizza. They created their first beer, Old Route 66 Golden Ale, in December 1993.

After a few months, Hennessy needed help with the growing brewing endeavor, recruiting Brady McKeown, then a University of New Mexico student. McKeown studied under Hennessy, receiving ground-up education in craft brewing, eventually becoming Il Vicino's Head Brewer. In 1995, Il Vicino's Wet Mountain IPA earned the young brewers their first Great American Beer Festival medal, starting a nearly two-decade progression of achievements for the brewery and McKeown.

In 2011, the partners opened the Il Vicino Brewery (IVB) Canteen taproom in Albuquerque's Brewery District. The 6,500-square-foot brewing facility also features an outdoor patio, food menu and live music.

== Awards ==
Canteen Brewhouse/Il Vicino Brewing Company has garnered 13 Great American Beer Festival medals, seven World Beer Cup medals, and is a six-time winner of the New Mexico IPA Challenge.

In all, the brewery has won over 115 local, national and international awards, and is the oldest Albuquerque brewery still in business.

Most recently, Canteen Brewhouse won two awards at the 2014 Great American Beer Festival - Gold Medal in the American-Style Amber/Red Ale category for Dougie Style Amber Ale, and Silver Medal in the Aged Beer category for Saint Bob's Imperial Stout '07.

== Name change ==
In September 2014, Il Vicino Brewing Company changed their name to Canteen Brewhouse.

== See also ==
- Albuquerque craft beer market
- List of breweries in New Mexico
- List of microbreweries
