= El Modelo =

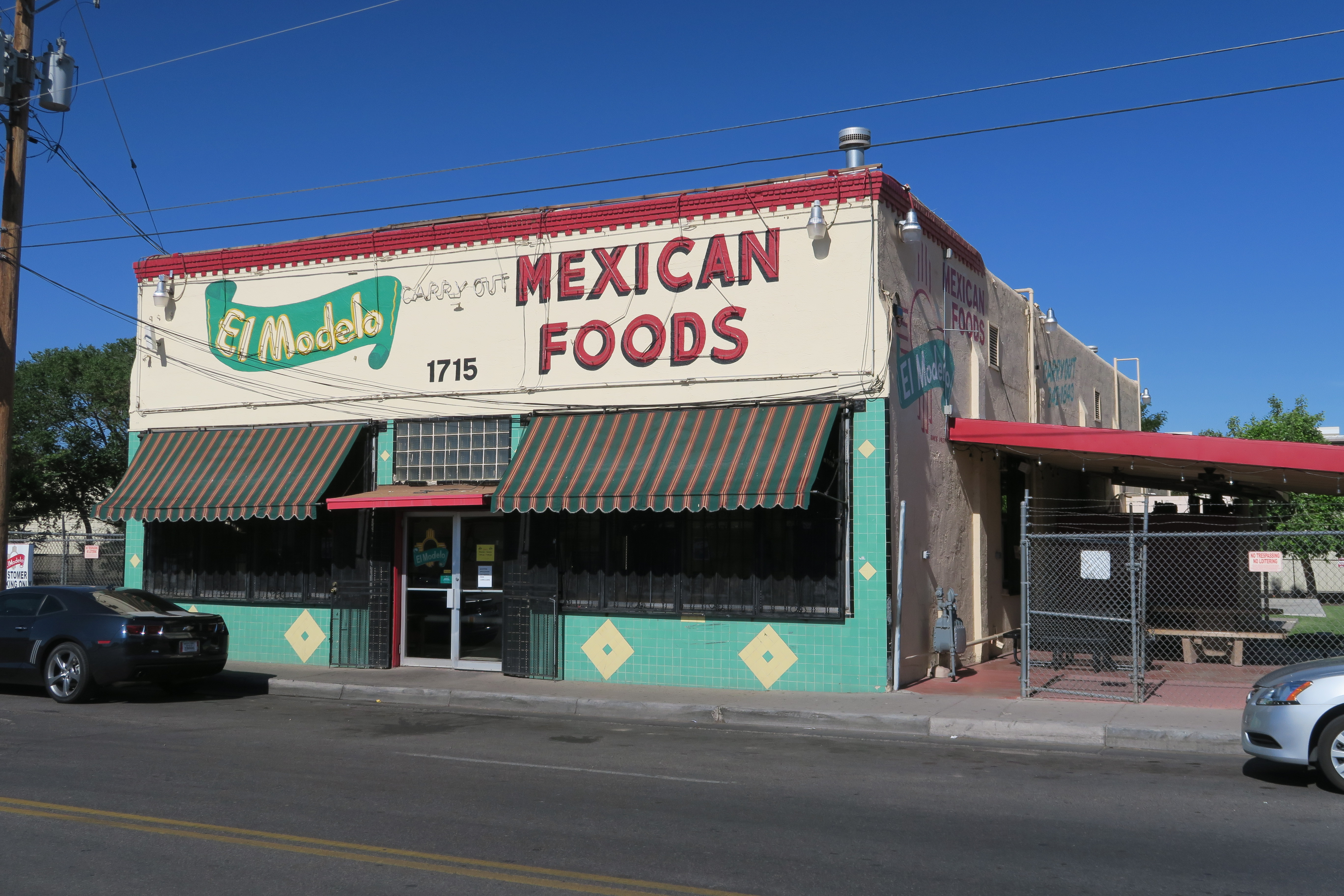
- El Modelo
- Interactive map of El Modelo

Restaurant information
- Established: 1929
- Dress code: Casual
- Location: 1715 2nd St SW, Albuquerque, New Mexico, 87102, United States
- Coordinates: 35.0685742°N 106.6524554°W
- Website: Official website

El Modelo (originally El Modelo Tortilla Factory) is a Mexican and New Mexican cuisine restaurant in the city of Albuquerque, New Mexico, which was founded in 1929. It is located in the historic neighborhood of Barelas.

== History ==
The restaurant was founded by Refugio and Carmen Garcia in 1929, as El Modelo Tortilla Factory. Carmen would get up at two in the morning to prepare tortillas to sell for breakfast. She hired Petra Vargas to make tamales. Vargas then taught Garcia's family how to make tamales. When Carmen's son, Leo Garcia, came home from World War II, in 1945, he went into business with his mother. In 1947, Salvador Garcia, the eldest son, helped build the current building in the former location of the family's three room house. The location has not changed since it was established in 1929. In 1985, Hector Mendoza and Virginia Chittim purchased the restaurant, and they ran it together until 2003. At which point, Virginia Chittim took full ownership of the restaurant.

== Today ==
El Modelo continues to serve tortillas and tamales. As well as New Mexican cuisine including, chile rellenos, enchiladas, stuffed sopapillas, huevos rancheros, burritos, and tacos.

== Reception ==
The restaurant was also ranked as the 4th best Mexican restaurant in Albuquerque by USAToday's 2012 10Best. In 2013, El Modelo was voted one of the "Best Mexican Restaurants in the U.S." by Travel + Leisure magazine, which described the food as "rave-worthy".
