= List of deep-fried foods =

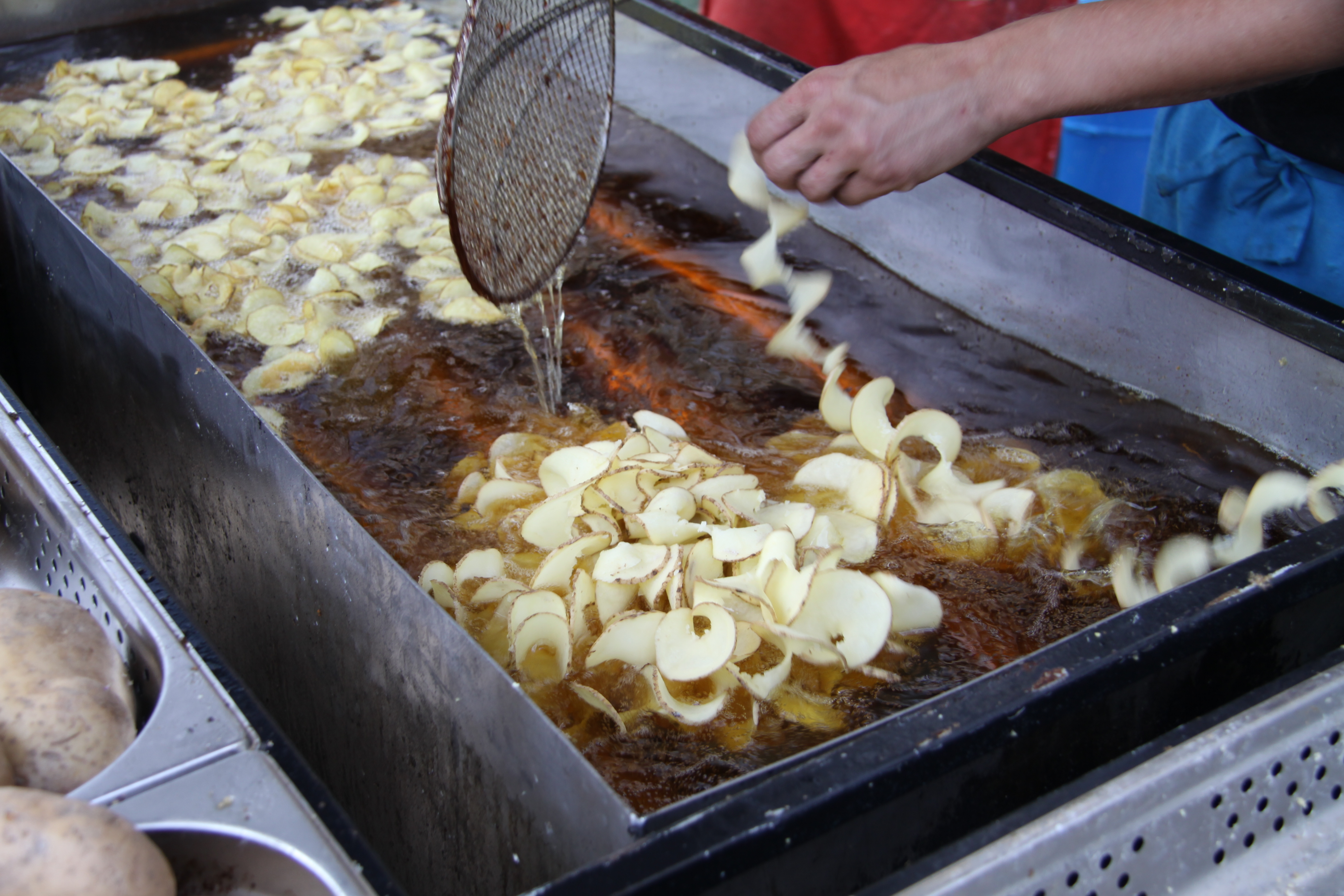
Potato chips being deep-fried

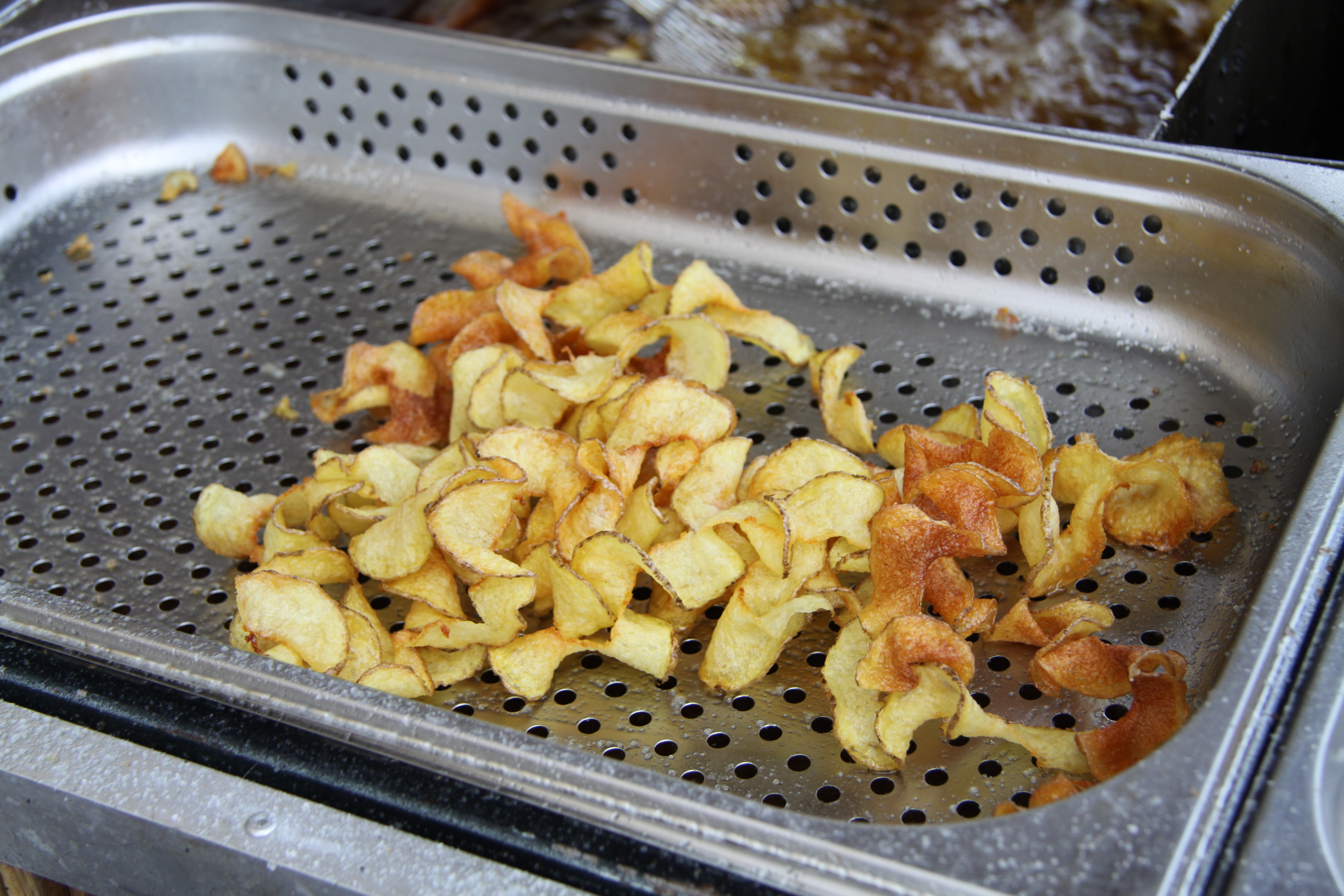
The finished product

This is a list of deep-fried foods and dishes. Deep frying is a cooking method in which food is submerged in hot fat, such as cooking oil. This is normally performed with a deep fryer or chip pan, and industrially, a pressure fryer or vacuum fryer may be used. Deep frying is classified as a dry cooking method because no water is used. Due to the high temperature involved and the high heat conduction of oil, the food is then prepared quickly.

== Deep-fried foods ==
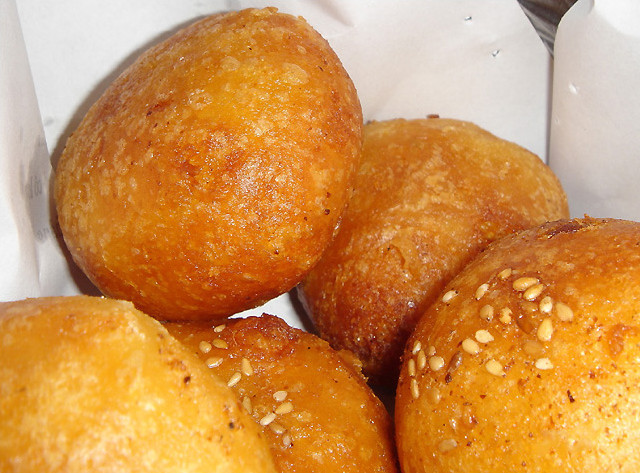
Bánh rán is a deep-fried glutinous rice ball from southern Vietnamese cuisine.

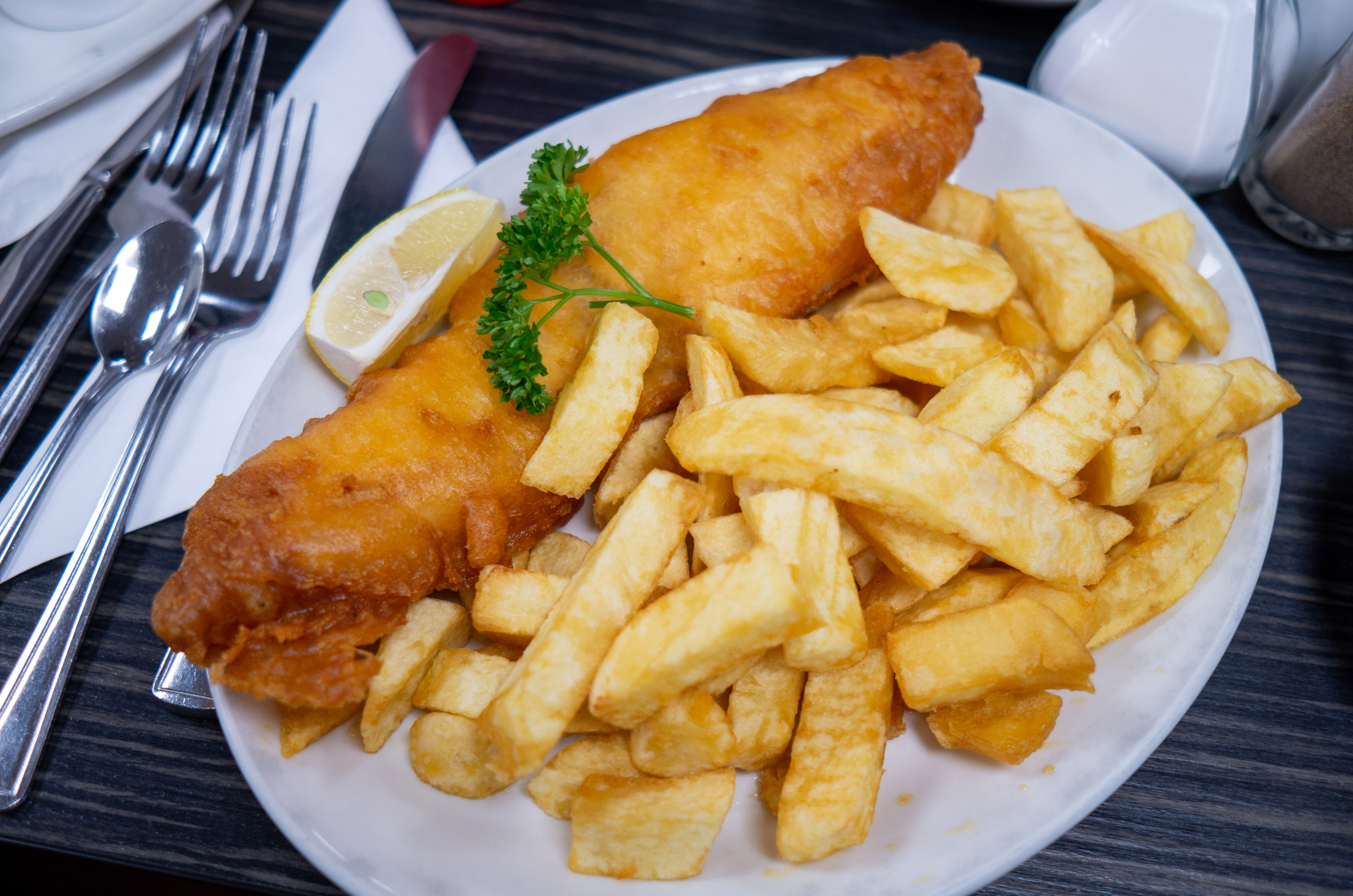
A standard serving of fish and chips

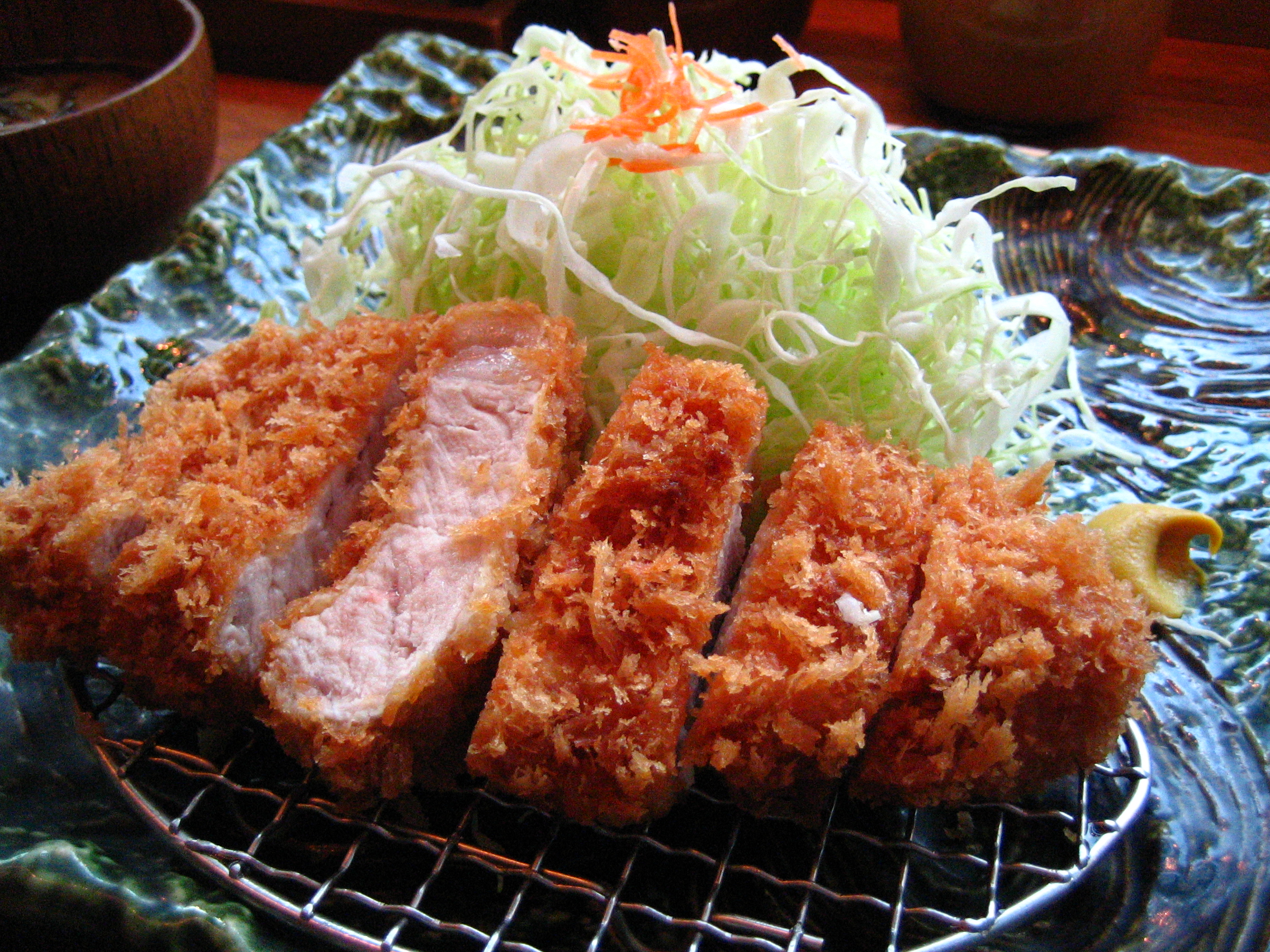
Breaded cutlet is a common dish worldwide.

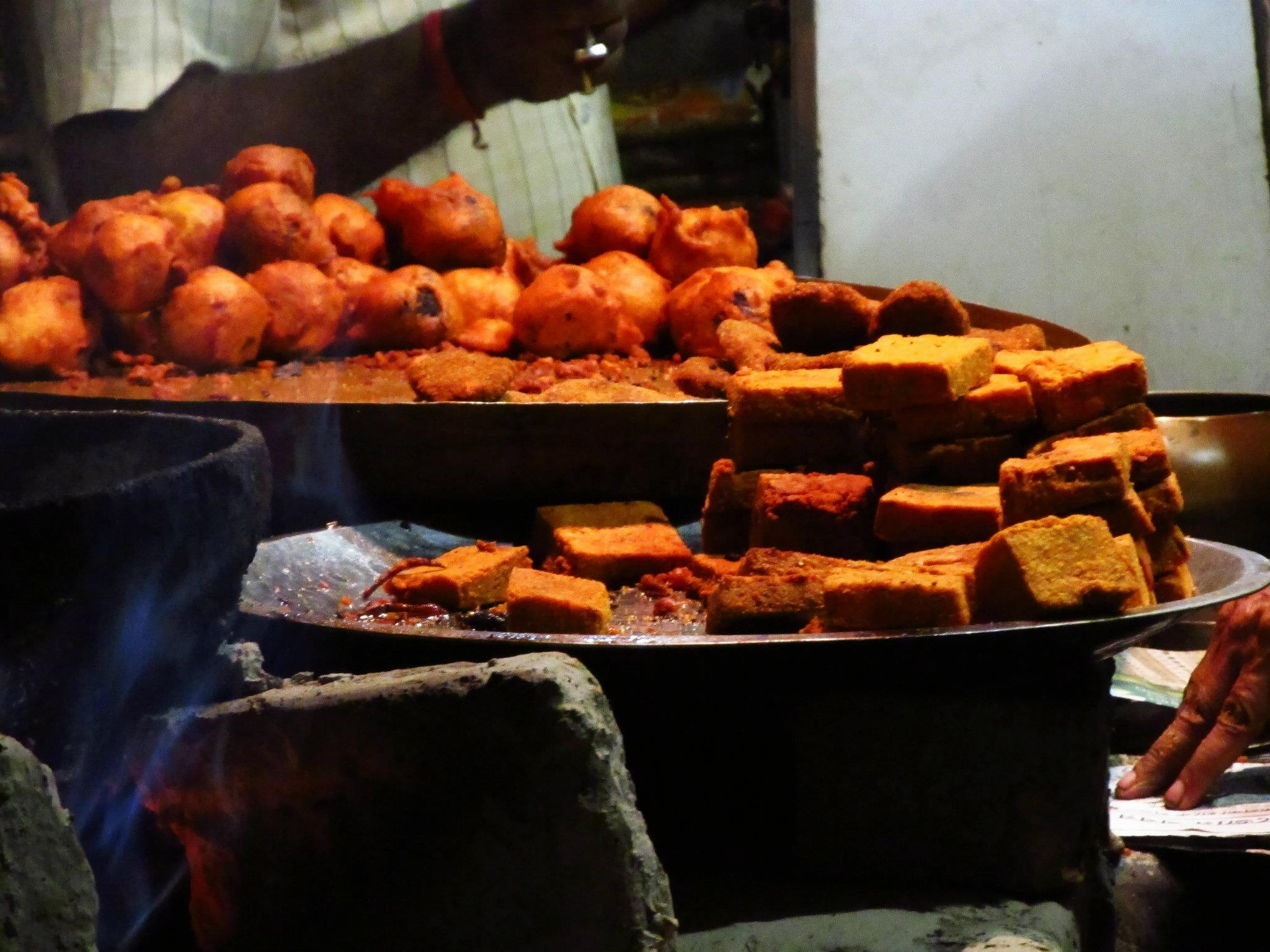
Bengali fritters (tele bhaja)

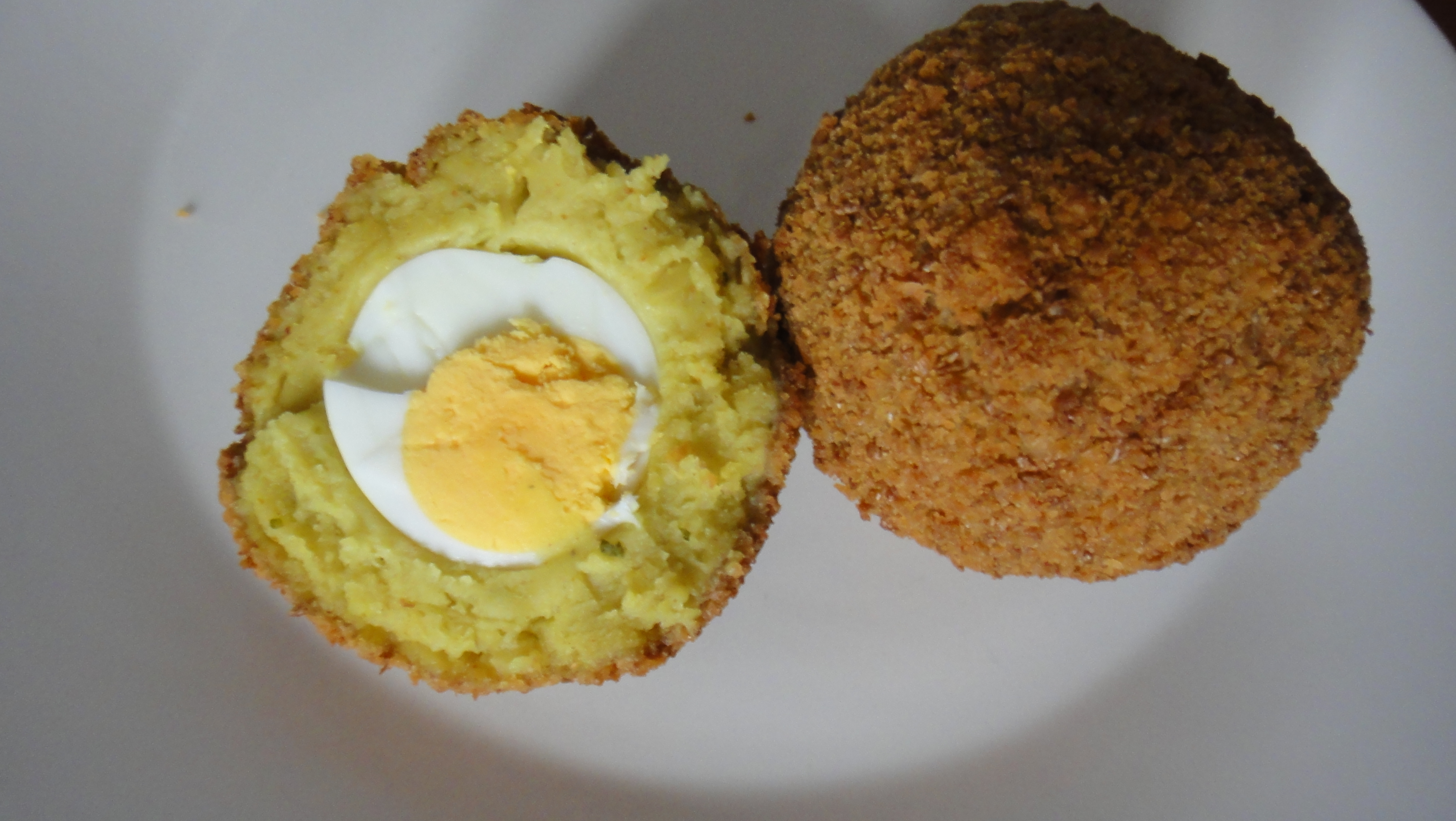
A halved breaded Scotch egg

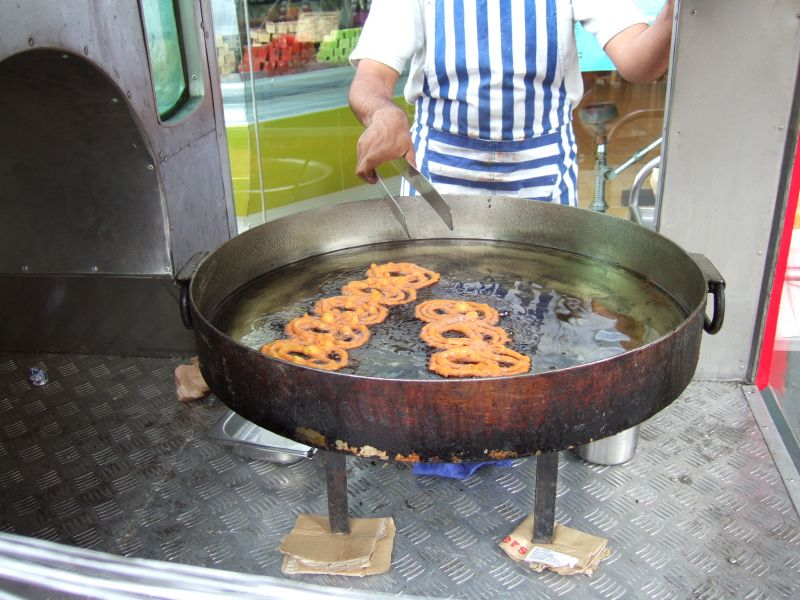
Jalebi being deep-fried

- Akara – Deep-fried bean cake
- Alcapurrias – Fritter from Puerto Rico
- Angel wings – Sweet crisp pastry
- Arancini – Italian snack food
- Arepa de huevo – South American corn flatbread
- Bacalaíto – Codfish fritter from Puerto Rico
- Bamischijf – Dutch snack
- Banana chips – Chip made of banana
- Banana fritter – Deep-fried battered banana or plantain
- Bánh – Traditional Vietnamese confectionery
- Bánh rán – Deep-fried glutinous rice ball Vietnamese dish
- Batata vada – Indian vegetarian fast food dish
- Bean chips – Snack food
- Beer Chips – American brand of thick-cut kettle style chips
- Beignet – French deep-fried doughnut
- Bhajji – Spiced fritter originally from the Indian subcontinent
- Bhatoora – Deep-fried bread from the Indian subcontinent
- Bife a cavalo – Steak and egg dish
- Bikaneri bhujia – Indian snack food
- Bitterballen – Savory Dutch meat-based snack
- Bonda – Deep-fried potato snack
- Boondi – Indian snack made from fried chickpea flour
- Breaded cutlet – Meat in breading or batter
  - Menchi-katsu – Japanese breaded and deep-fried ground meat patty
- Buñuelo – Fried dough ball
- Cactus fries – Southwestern United States side dish
- Çäkçäk – Deep-fried sweet dough
- Calas – Creole rice fritters
- Camote cue – Popular snack food in the Philippines
- Caşcaval pane – European dish
  - Czech Smažený sýr
  - Slovak Vyprážaný syr
- Chả giò – Vietnamese spring roll
- Cheburek – Crimean Tatar savoury pastry
- Chimichanga – Mexican and Southwestern American dish
- Chislic – Traditional South Dakotan dish similar to shashlik
- Chugchucaras – Food of Ecuador
- Churro – Fried-dough pastry
- Corn dog – Deep-fried, corn-battered hot dog on a stick
- Crab cake – American crab dish
- Creier pane – Romanian animal brain dish
- Crinkle-cutting – Technique of cutting vegetables
- Crisp-fried onions – Method of cooking onions
- Croquette – Small breaded, deep-fried food (coxinha)
- Deep-fried butter – Snack food made of butter
- Deep-fried egg – Dish consisting of an egg that has been deep-fried
- Deep-fried haggis – Scottish savoury pudding containing sheep's pluck
- Deep-fried Mars bar – Novelty Scottish confectionery
- Doughnut – Sweet food made from deep-fried dough

- Egg roll – American Chinese appetizer
- Emping – Indonesian traditional chips
- Falafel – Middle Eastern fried bean dish
- Far far – Snack food of Indian origin
- Flauta – Mexican dish
- French fries – Deep-fried strips of potato
- Fried cauliflower – Widespread dish in Europe, Middle East, and Asia
- Fried chicken – Dish of seasoned chicken pieces that are coated and fried
- Fried Coke – Fried Coca-Cola flavored batter
- Fried dough – North American dessert
- Fried mushrooms – Hors d'oeuvre made from mushrooms
- Fried okra – Type of food
- Frikandel – Deep fried meat snack
- Frybread – Variety of flatbread
- Funnel cake – Deep-fried batter
- German fries – Thinly sliced raw or cooked potatoes fried in fat
- Gogoși – Romanian deep-fried doughnut
- Haggis pakora – Scottish snack food of haggis ingredients prepared as pakoras
- Hash browns – Fried potato dish
- Hush puppies – Deep-fried savory food made from cornmeal batter
- Jalebi – Deep-fried South Asian pastry
- Jau gok – Cantonese-style pastry snack
- Jonnycake – American cornmeal flatbread
- Kakara pitha – India deep-fried cake
- Karaage – Japanese cooking technique
- Karintō – Traditional Japanese snack food
- Khapsey – Tibetian deep-fried biscuit
- Klenät – Nordic fried pastry
- Kluklu – Nigerian snack made from peanut
- Kokis – Sri Lankan food
- Kripik – Indonesian chips
- Krupuk – Southeast Asian deep fried crackers
- Lángos – Hungarian deep-fried flatbread
- Lok-lok – Malaysian street food
- Luchi – Deep-fried flatbread made of wheat flour
- Mandazi – Fried bread
- Maruya – Filipino banana fritters
- Medu vada – Deep-fried Indian food item
- Mianwo – Chinese donut
- Mofongo – Puerto Rican plantain dish
- Mozzarella sticks – Fried breaded or battered mozzarella
- Namak para – Crunchy savory snack from Bihar, India
- Noodles – Noodle dishes common throughout Asia
- Pakora – Spiced fritter originally from the Indian subcontinent
- Panipuri – Indian street food
- Panzarotti – Baked Italian pizza dish
- Papad – Flatbread from the Indian subcontinent
- Parmigiana – Italian dish of eggplant with cheese and tomato sauce
- Pastie – Northern Ireland dish of battered deep-fried meat and vegetables
- Patra – Vegetarian dish from India
- Deep-fried peanuts
- Pholourie – Fried, spiced dough balls
- Deep-fried pizza – Style of pizza preparation
- Picarones – Peruvian dessert
- Pionono – Spanish pastry – the Puerto Rican version
- Pizza puff – Filled deep-fried dough pocket
- Potato pancake – Shallow-fried pancakes of grated or ground potato
  - Boxty – Traditional Irish potato pancake
- Puri – South Asian deep-fried bread
- Puff-puff – African fried dough snack and pastry
- Ripper – Type of hotdog
- Rissole – European fried dish
- Rosette – Deep-fried fritter
- Sabudana vada – Tapioca pearl fritters from Maharashtra, India
- Sachima – Manchurian pastry
- Samosa – Deep-fried snack/turnover
- Scotch egg – Boiled egg wrapped in sausage meat
- Scraps – Deep-fried batter often served with fish and chips
- Sev – South Asian snack food
- Shankarpali – Indian sweet snack
- Sorullos – Puerto Rican fried cornmeal dish
- Spam fritter – Slice of Spam fried in batter
- Spice bag – Fast food dish created in Ireland
- Spring roll – Type of dim sum – some varieties are deep-fried
- Steak pie – British meat pie
- Struffoli – Deep-fried dough sweetened with honey
- Supplì – Italian snack food
- Swikee – Indonesian frog leg dish
- Taiwanese fried chicken – Dish in Taiwanese cuisine
- Taro dumpling – Chinese cuisine
- Tempura – Japanese dish of battered, deep-fried fish or vegetables
- Toasted ravioli – Italian-American appetizer dish
- Tostone – Fried plantain found in Latin American and Caribbean cuisine
- Turkey – Meat from a turkey
- Wonton – Type of Chinese dumpling
- Zeppole – Italian doughnut
Deep-fried foods

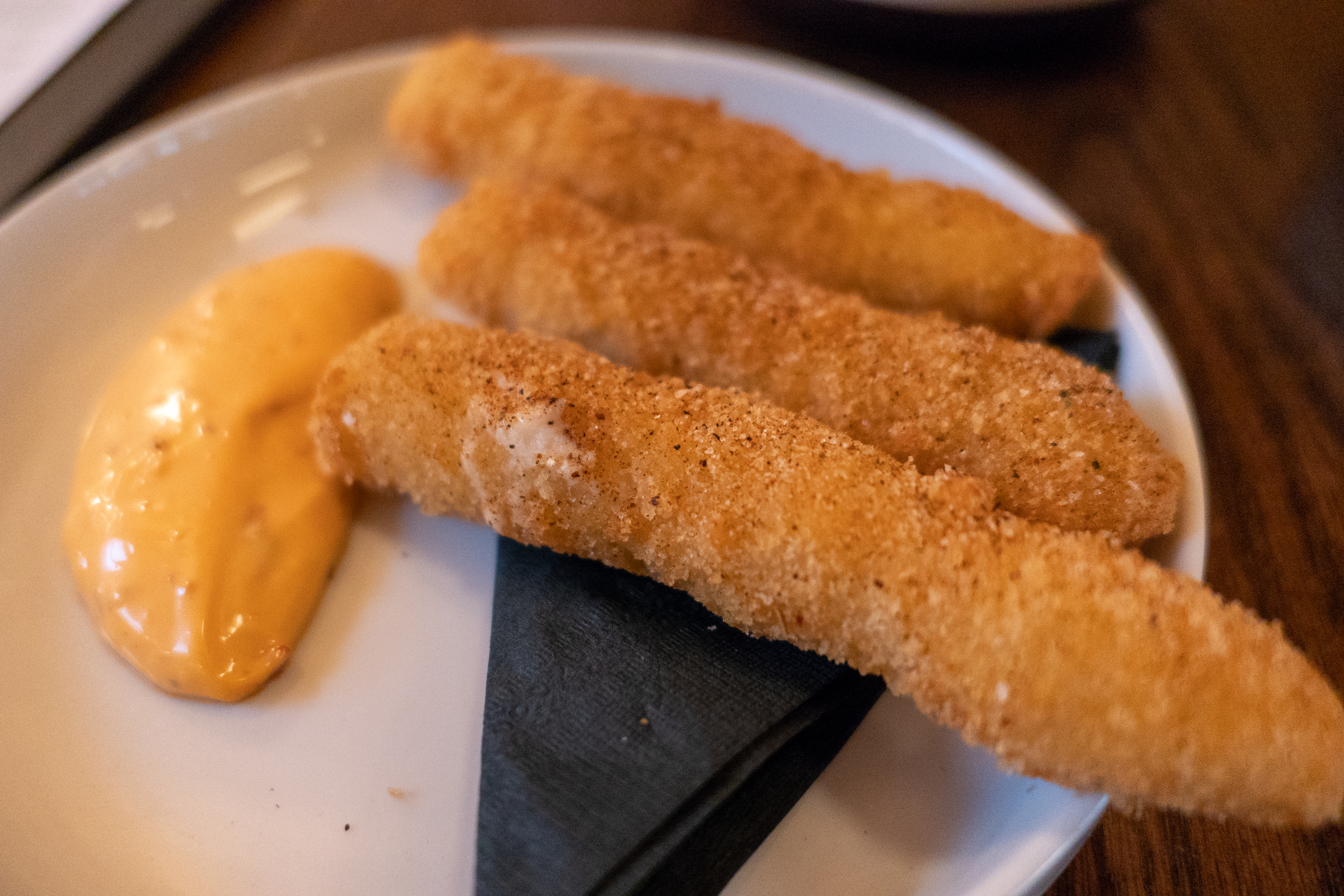
Mozzarella sticks are a type of deep-fried cheese.

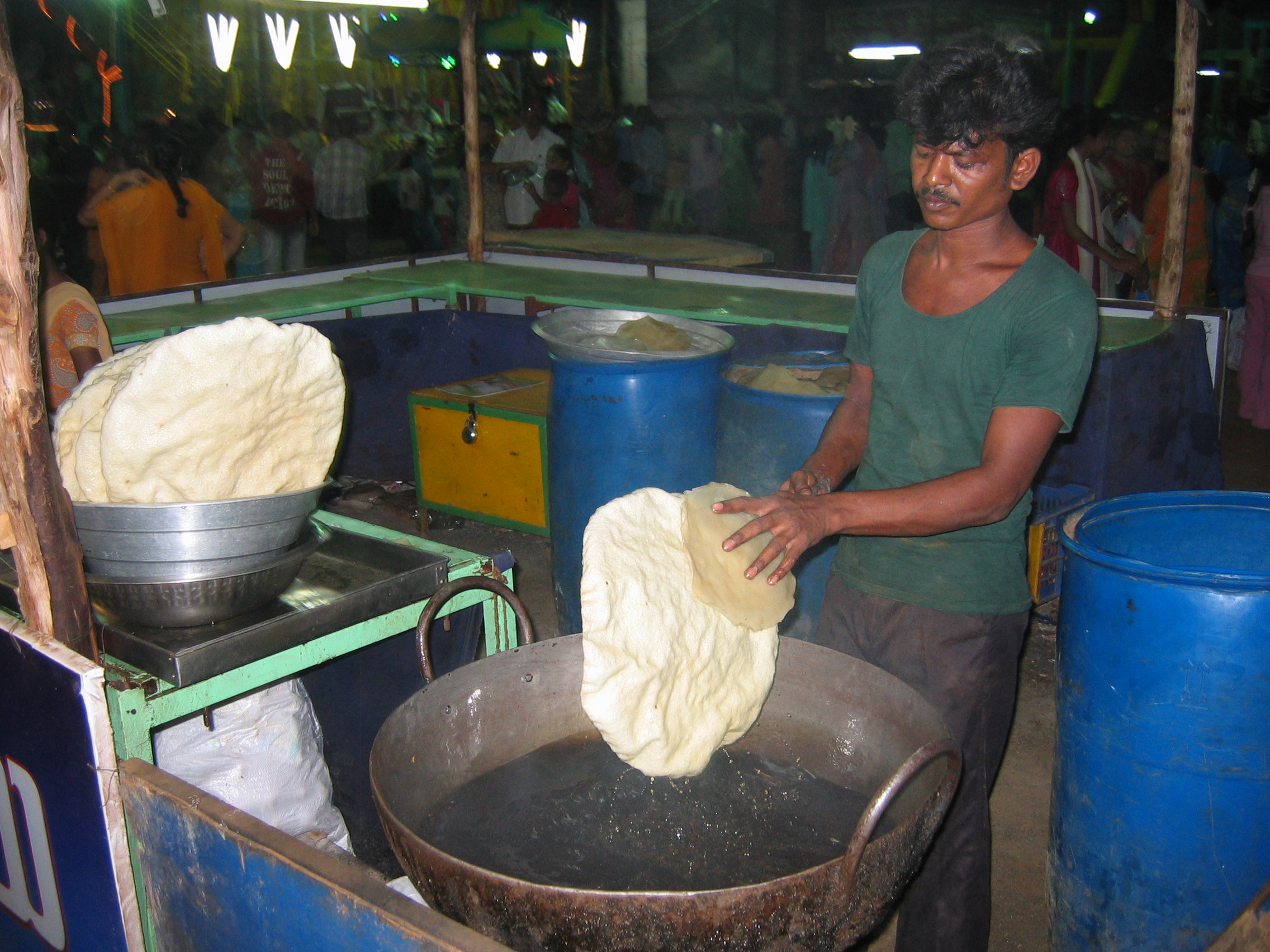
Deep-fried papad being prepared at an exhibition in Guntur, India

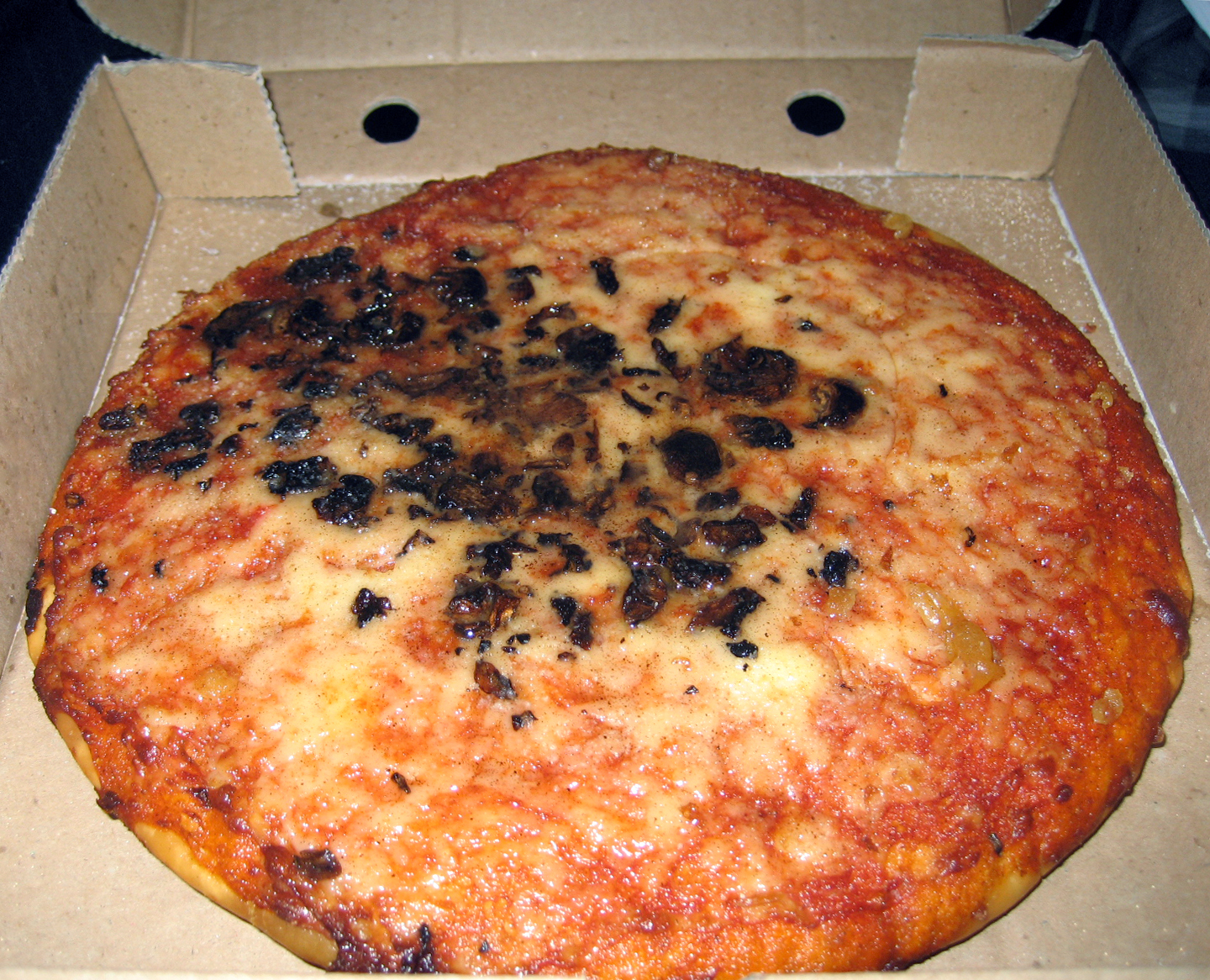
Deep-fried pizza, also known as a "pizza crunch" in Scotland

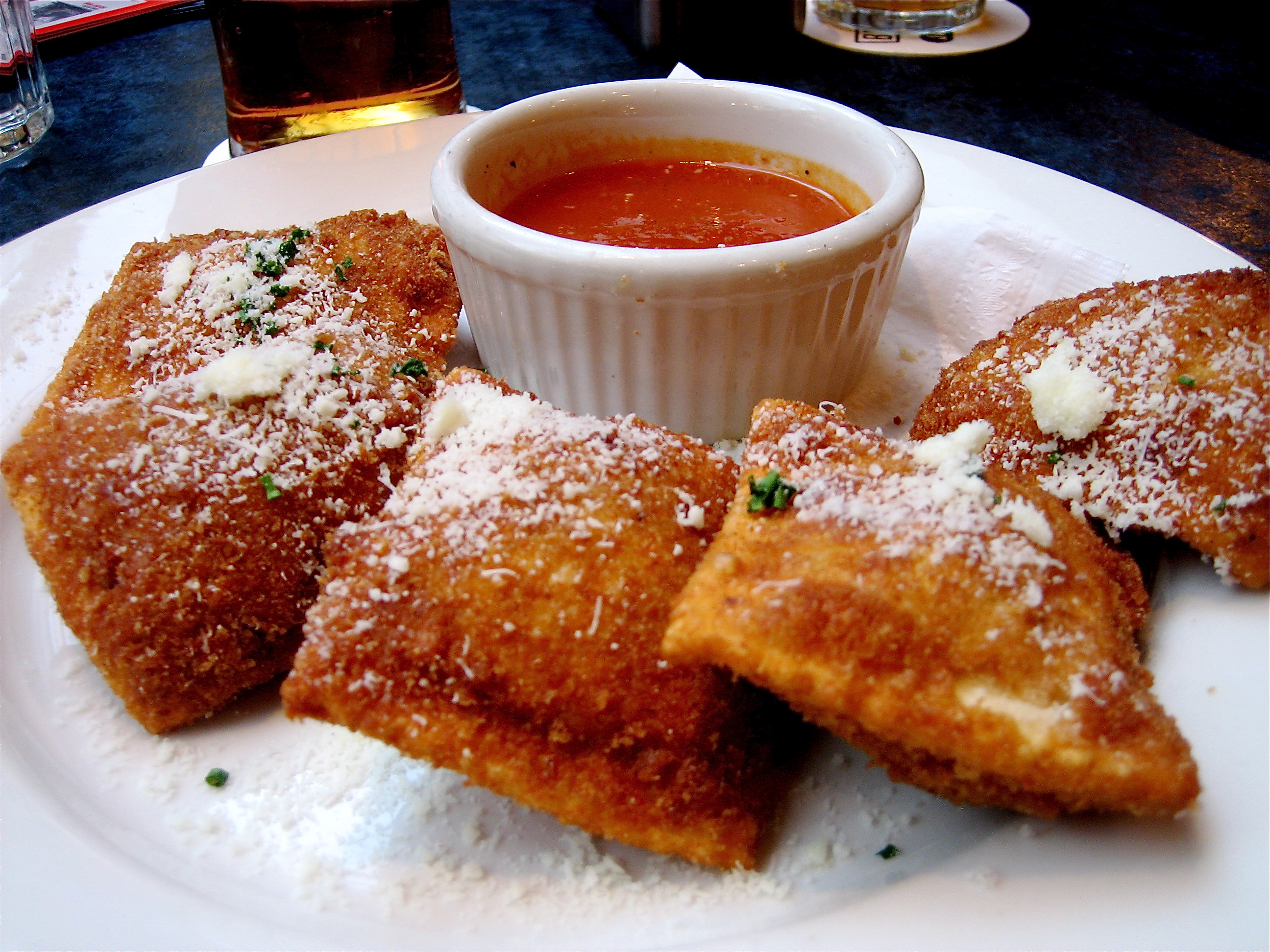
Toasted ravioli is an appetizer created and popularized in St. Louis, Missouri.

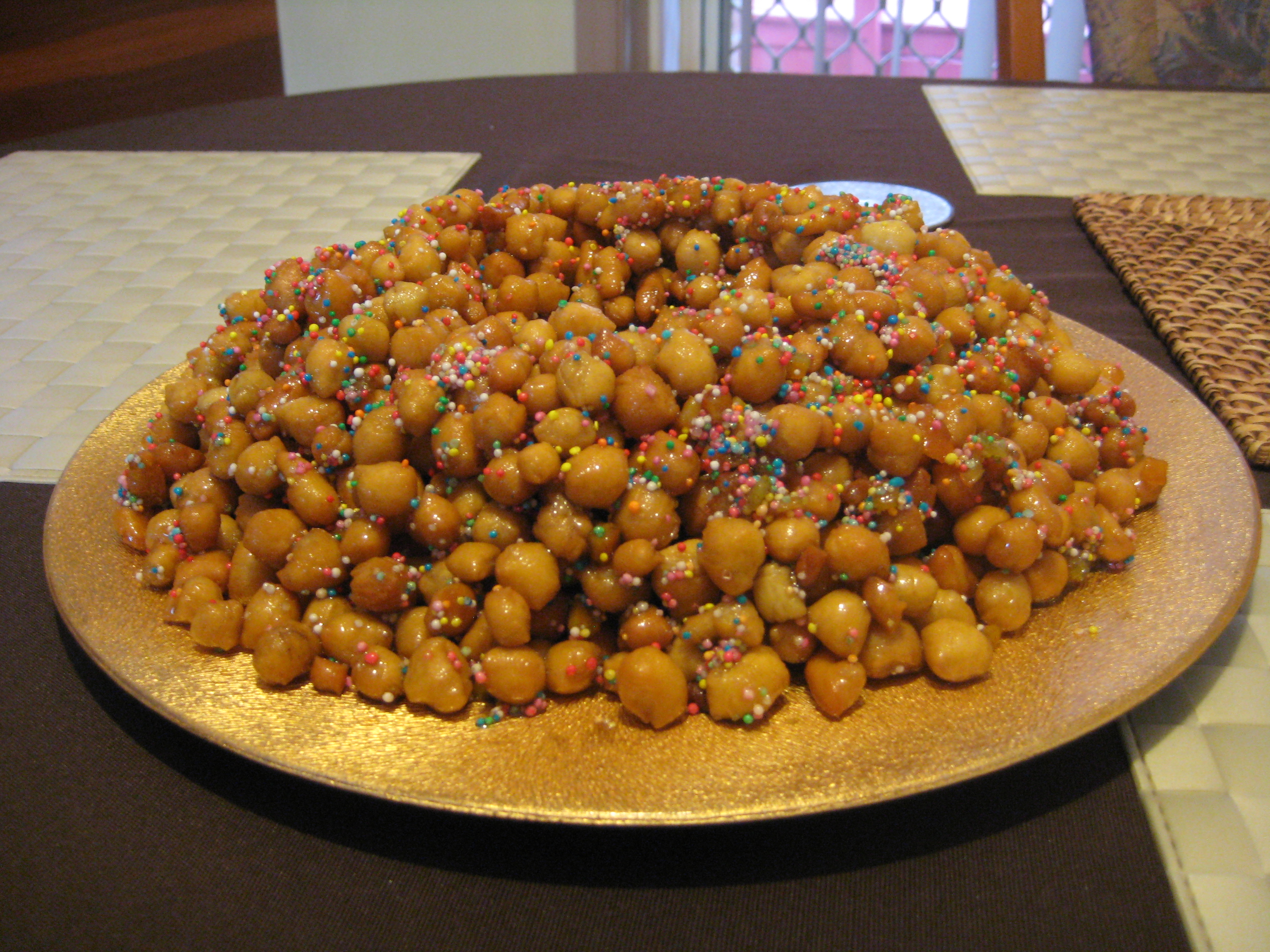
Struffoli is a Neapolitan dish made of deep-fried balls of dough about the size of marbles.

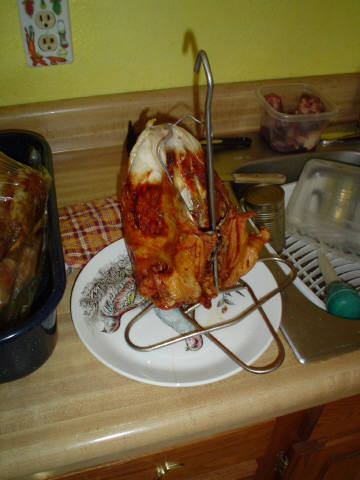
Deep-fried turkey can be prepared using a turkey fryer.

== By main ingredient ==
=== Beef ===
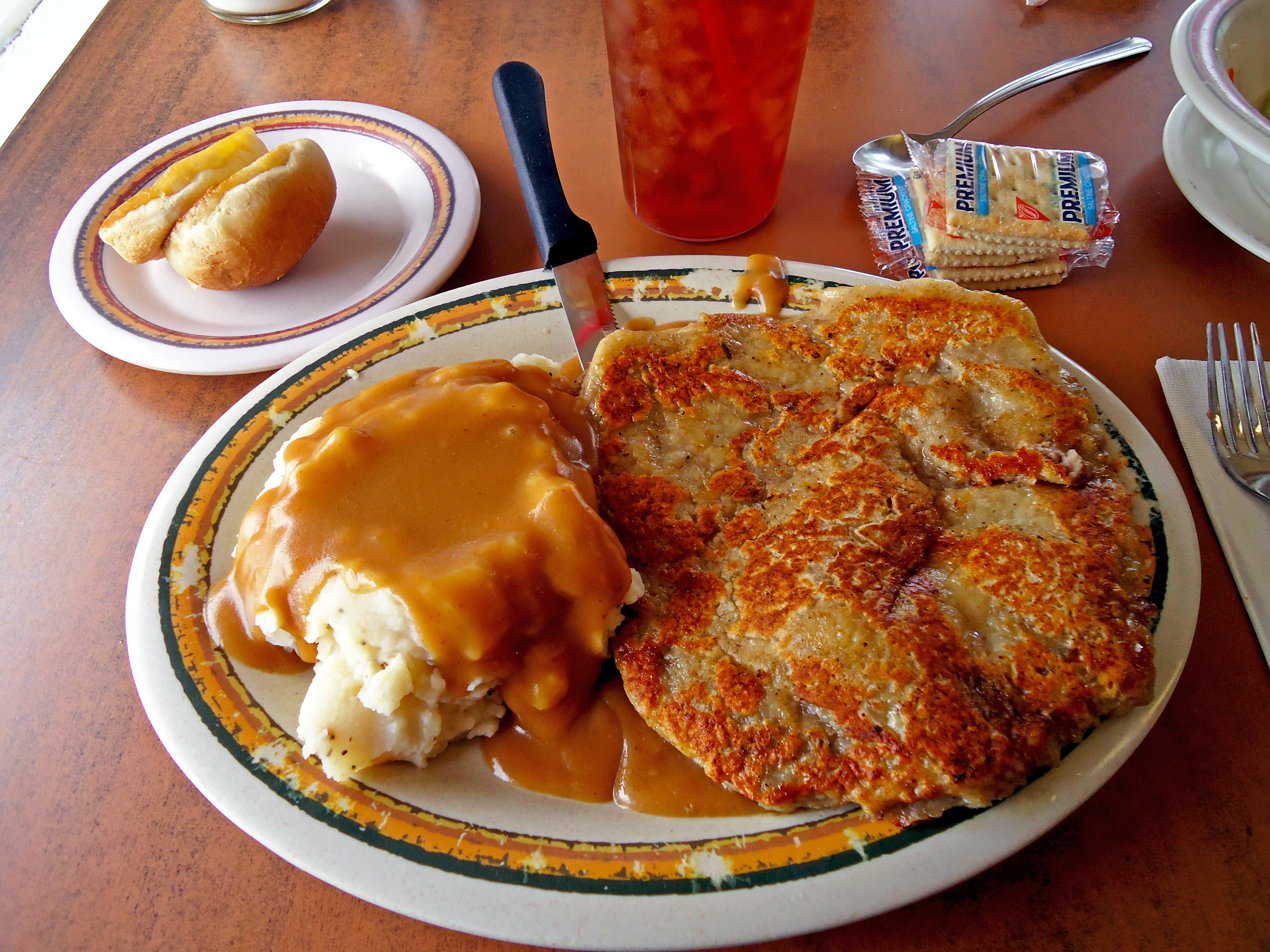
Chicken-fried steak with mashed potatoes and gravy

- Crispy tadyang ng baka – Beef dish
- Cheburek – Crimean Tatar savoury pastry
- Chicken-fried steak – American breaded cutlet dish
- Gepuk – Indonesian sweet and spicy fried beef dish
- Finger steaks – Deep-fried steak strips
- Rambak petis – Javanese snack food
- Rocky Mountain oysters – Fried bull testicles

=== Chicken ===
- Ayam geprek – Indonesian fried chicken dish
- Ayam goreng – Indonesian and Malay fried chicken dish
- Ayam goreng kalasan – Indonesian traditional fried chicken
- Ayam penyet – Indonesian traditional fried chicken
- Ayam pop – Indonesian chicken dish
- Barberton chicken – Serbian-American fried chicken dish
- Backhendl – Austrian fried chicken dish
- Buffalo wing – American dish of spicy chicken wings
- Cashew chicken, Springfield-style – Chinese-American dish (regular cashew chicken is stir-fried)
- Chicken 65 – South Indian chicken dish
- Chicken fingers – U.S. dish of breaded and fried chicken meat
- Chicken lollipop – Indian fried chicken appetizer
- Chicken nugget – Breaded deboned chicken meat pieces – sometimes deep fried
- Chicken with chilies – Chongqing dish of deep-fried chicken with dried chilies
- Chimaek – Korean fried chicken served with beer
- Coxinha – Brazilian snack
- Crispy fried chicken – Chinese dish of fried chicken
- Fried chicken – Dish of seasoned chicken pieces that are coated and fried
- General Tso's chicken – Deep-fried chicken dish
- Karaage – Japanese cooking technique
- Orange chicken – American Chinese chicken dish
- Parmo – English take-away dish
- Popcorn chicken – Chicken dish originated from Kentucky Fried Chicken
- Sesame chicken – Chicken dish
- Spice bag – Fast food dish created in Ireland
- Tongdak – Korean term for fried whole chicken
- Yangnyeom chicken – Sauced Korean fried chicken variety
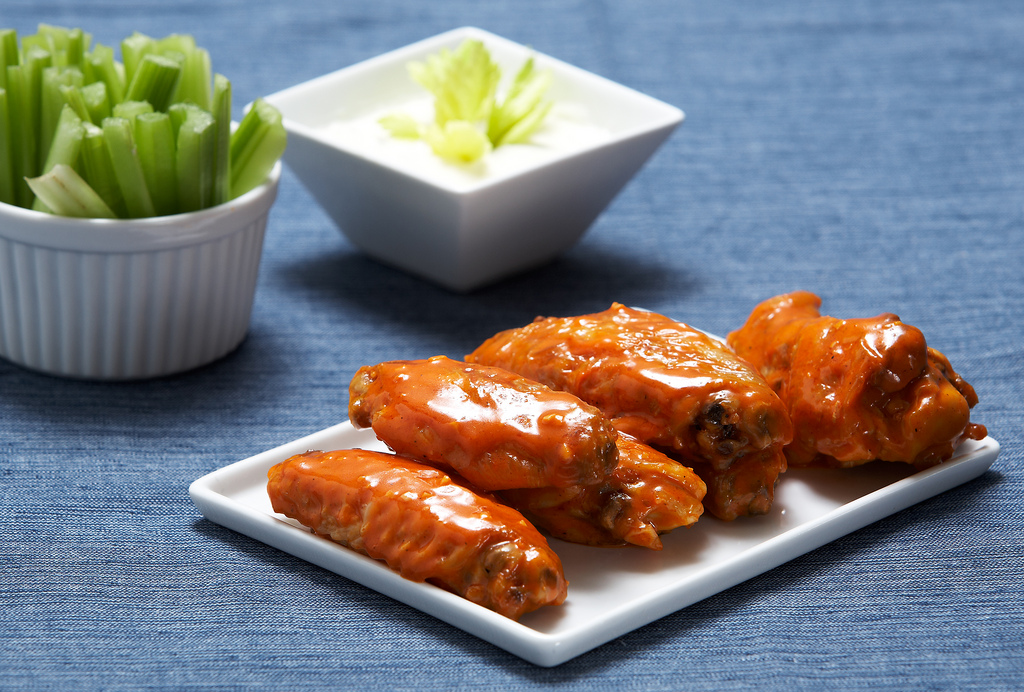
Buffalo wings at a restaurant

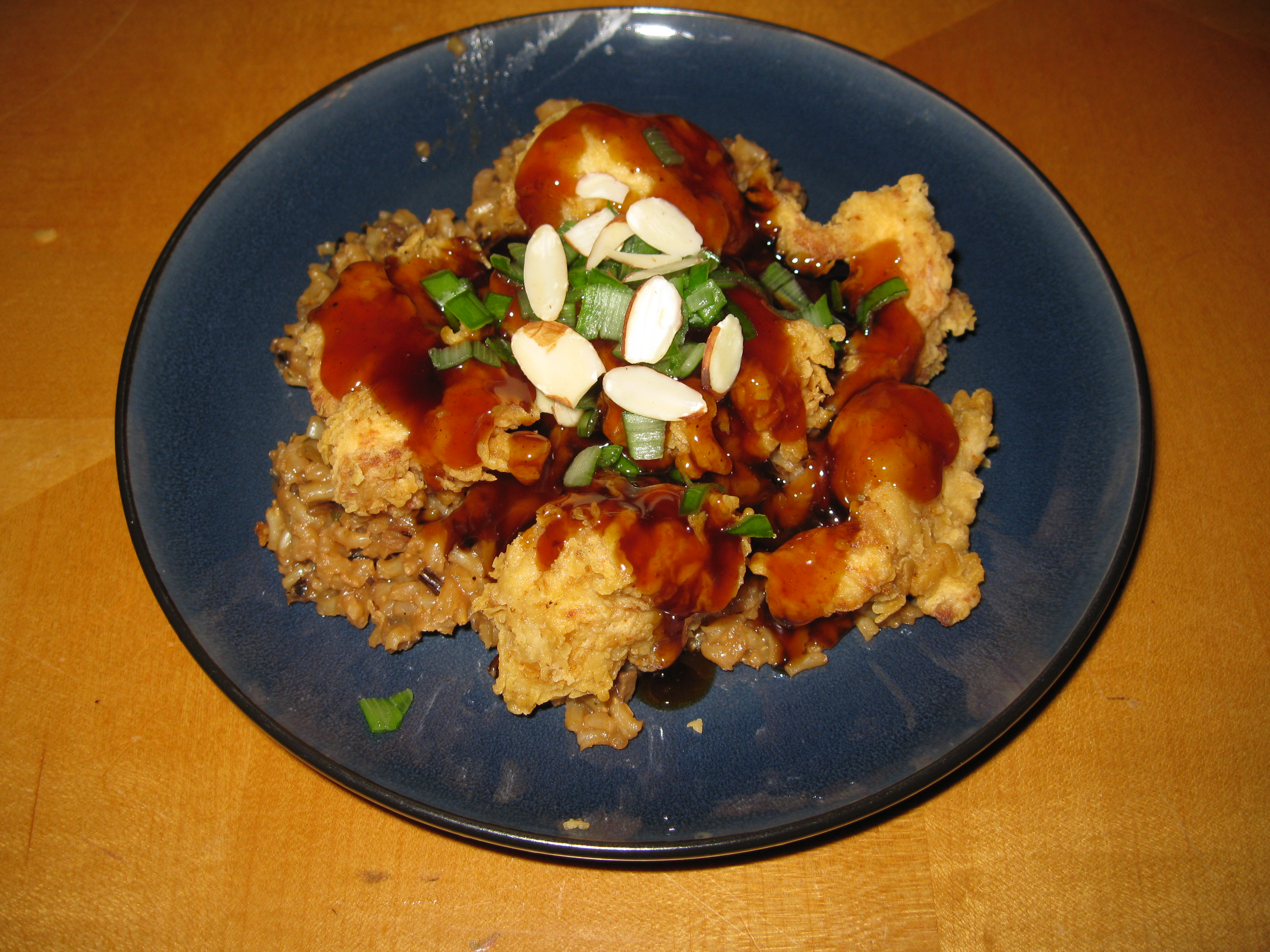
Springfield-style cashew chicken

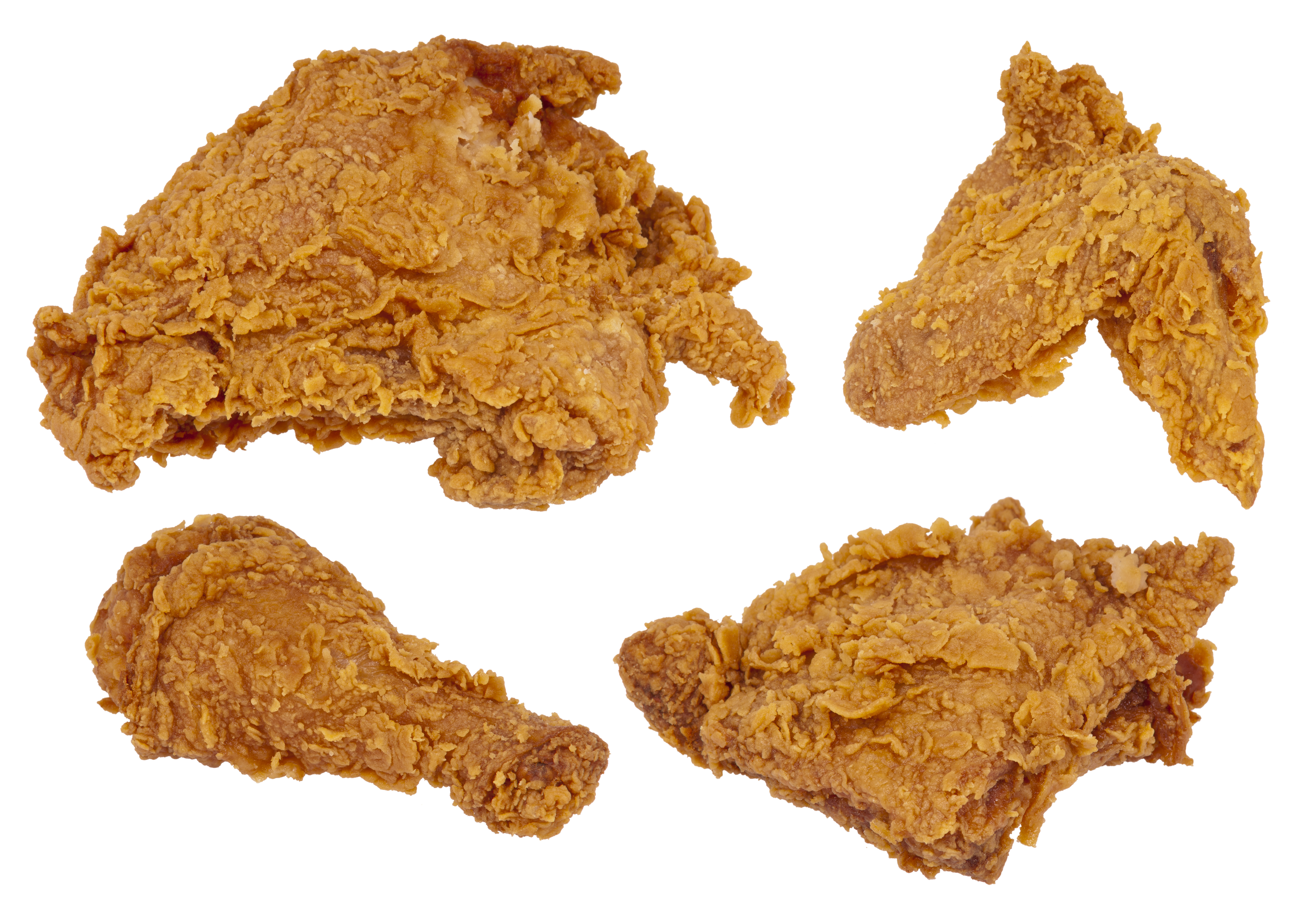
Fried chicken

=== Convenience foods and candy ===
- Deep-fried Mars bar – Novelty Scottish confectionery
- Deep-fried Oreo – Deep fried chocolate sandwich cookie
- Deep-fried Twinkie – American snack cake
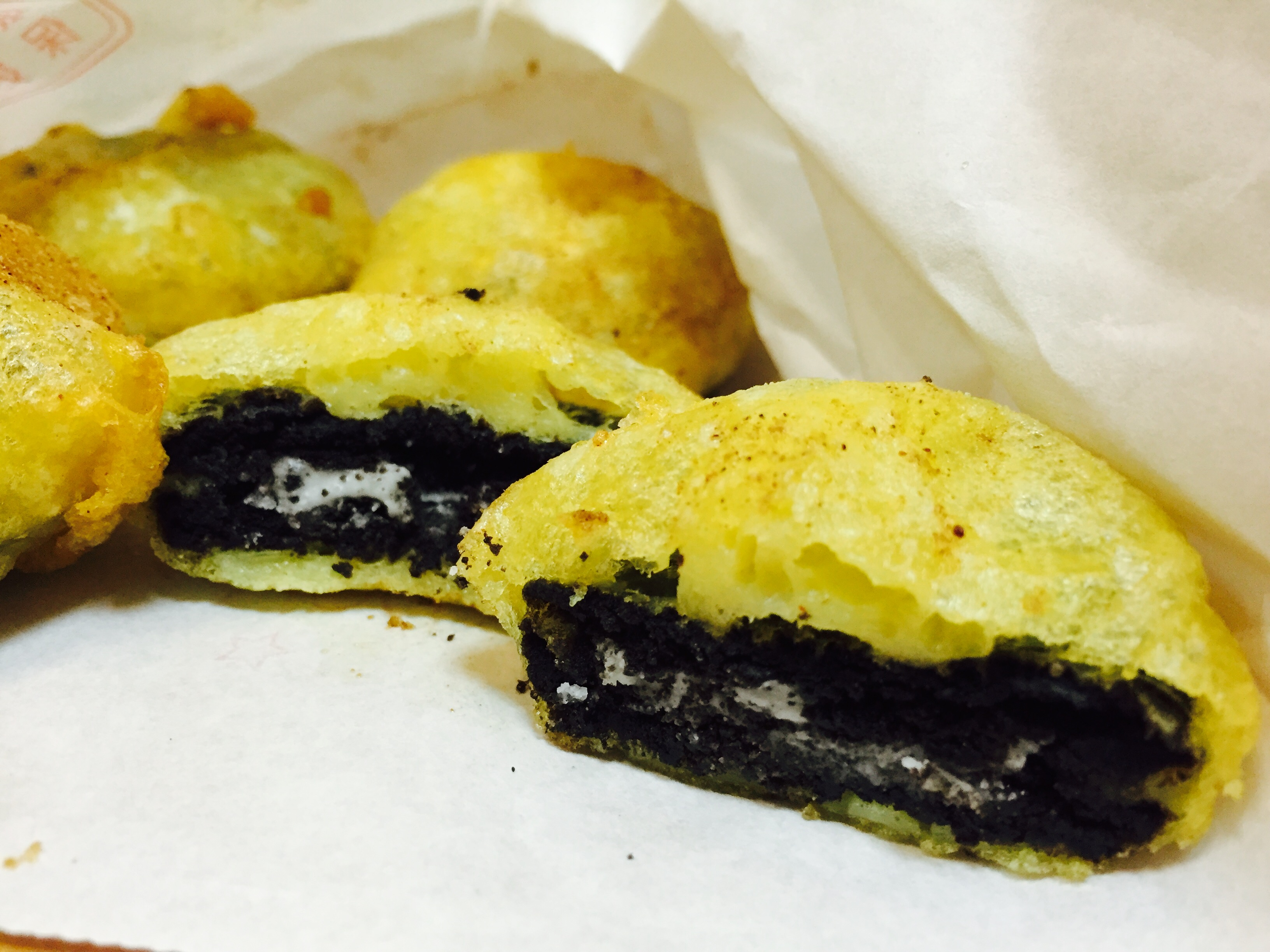
A deep-fried Oreo

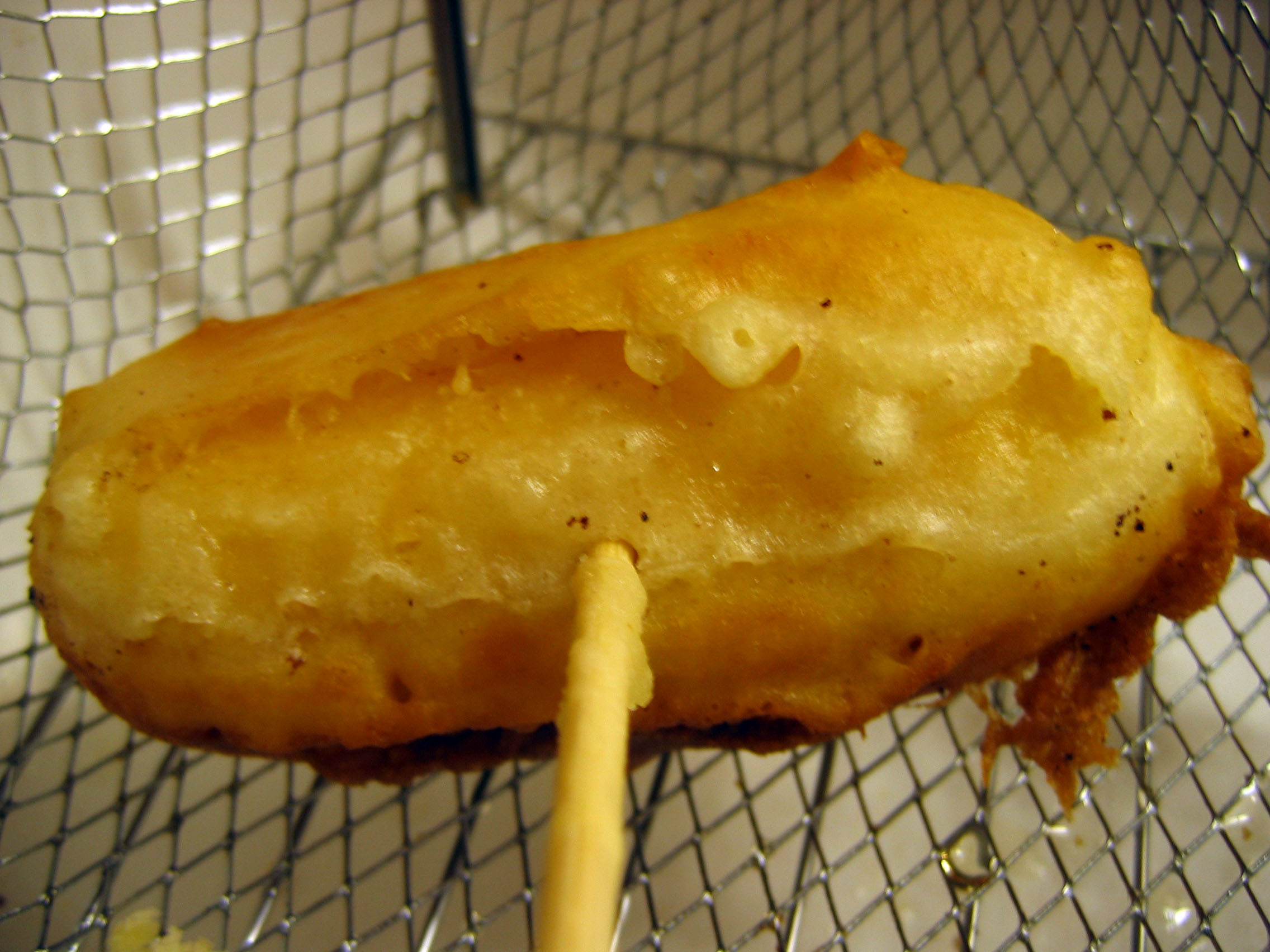
A deep-fried Twinkie

=== Dairy products ===
- Fried milk – Deep-fried Cantonese dessert (also crema fritta)
- Deep-fried butter – Snack food made of butter
- Fried cheese – Cheese dish fried in oil
- Fried cheese curds – Unaged curdled milk product
- Fried ice cream – Coated, deep-fried dessert
- Leche frita – Traditional Spanish dessert, Spanish sweet typical of northern Spain

=== Fish and seafood ===
- Calamari
- Camaron rebosado – Philippine shrimp dish
- Clam cake – Seafood dish
- Coconut shrimp – Shrimp dish
- Crab puff – Ball of crab meat deep-fried in batter
- Crab rangoon – American Chinese dumpling appetizers
- Fish and chips – British fried fish and fried potato dish
- Fishcake – Fried minced or ground seafood
- Fish finger – Breaded processed fish
- Fried clams – New England seafood dish
- Fried prawn – Type of food
- Gulha – Tuna and coconut dumplings
- Kibbeling – Dutch seafood snack, consisting of chunks of deep-fried cod
- Pescado frito – Fried fish dish
- Prawn cracker – Southeast Asian crackers made of prawn and tapioca flour
- Seafood basket – Fried fish dish
- Topote – Local dish of Veracruz, Mexico
- Tempura – Japanese dish of battered, deep-fried fish or vegetables
- Yin Yang fish – Human consumption of live aquatic organisms
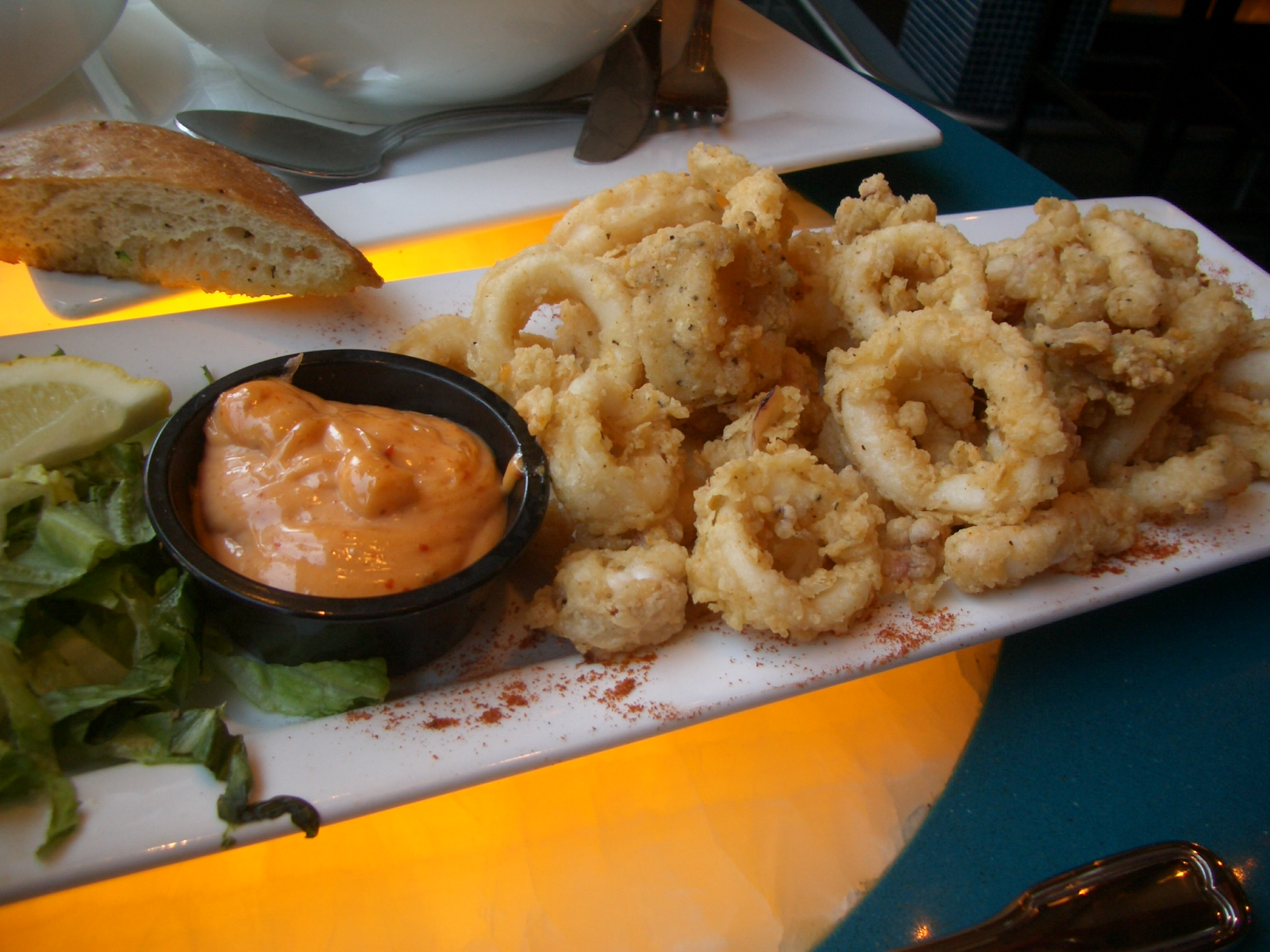
Deep fried calamari

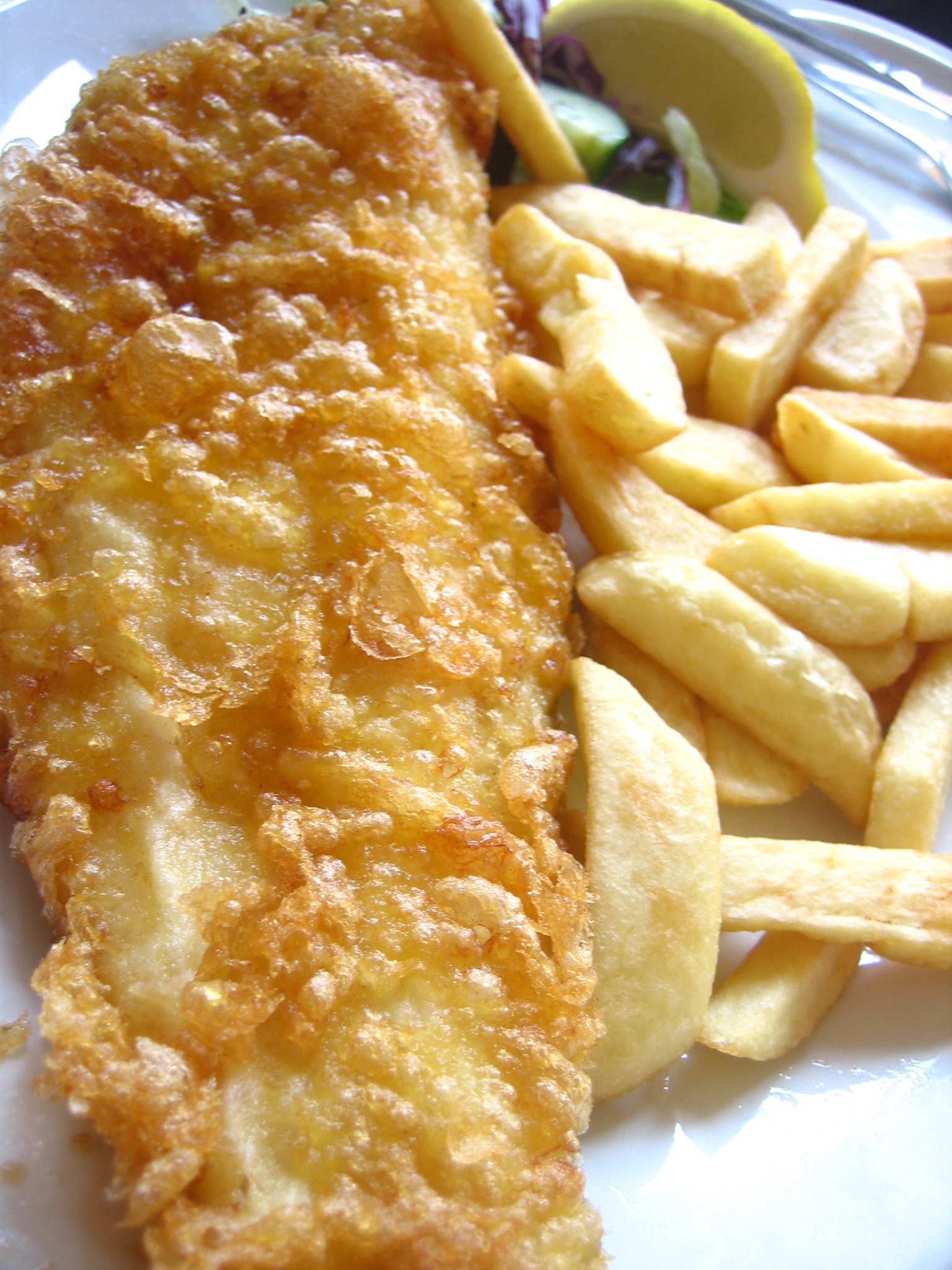
Fish and chips

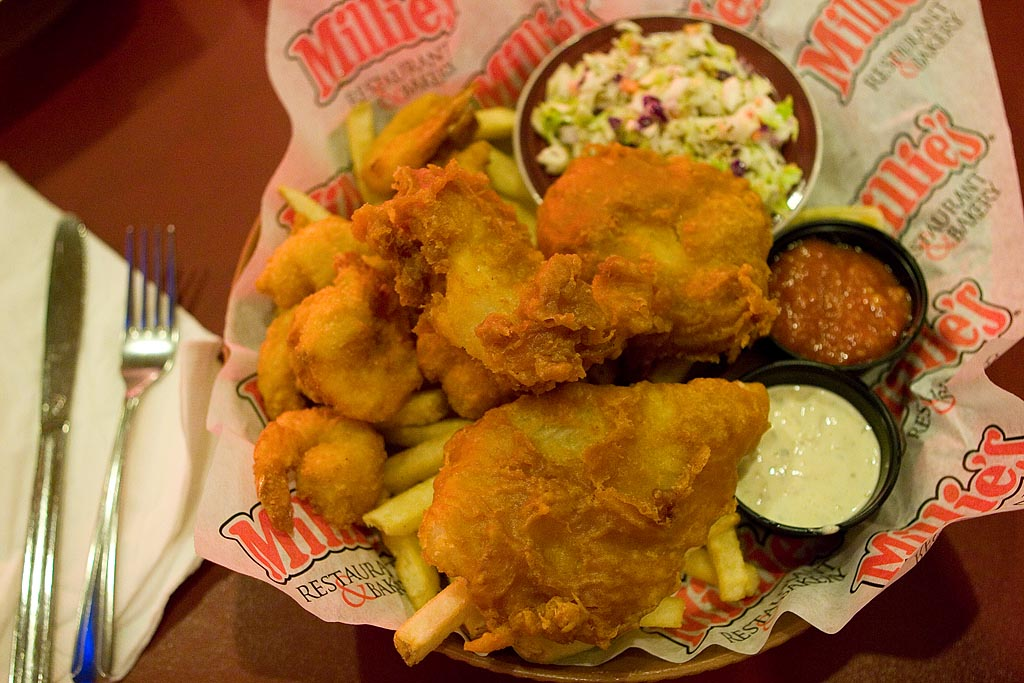
A seafood basket at a restaurant

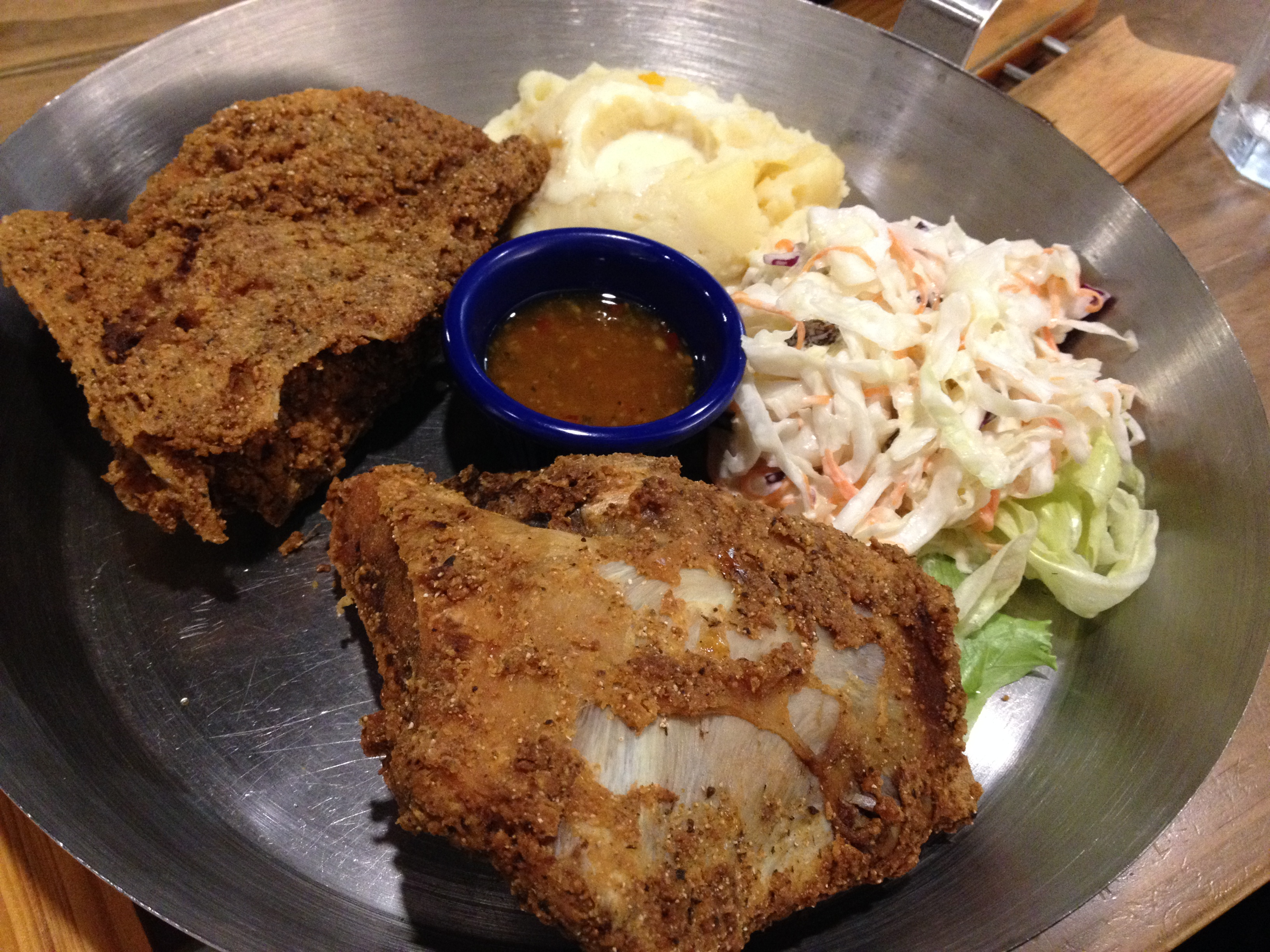
Deep fried swordfish collar

=== Fruits and vegetables ===
- Apple chips – Food
- Banana chip – Chip made of banana
- Banana cue – Banana dish from Philippines
- Bawang goreng – Indonesian crispy fried shallot
- Beguni – Bengal region brinjal dish
- Bugak – Deep-fried Korean vegetable snack
- Carrot chips – Snack made of carrots
- Cassava-based dishes – Foods prepared with cassava
  - Keripik sanjay
  - Tapioca chips
- Chifle – Fried plantain chip dish
- Chile relleno – Stuffed chili pepper dish in Mexican cuisine – sometimes deep fried
- Corn chips – Snack food made from cornmeal
- Corn fritter – Fried cakes of maize dough
- Corn tortilla dishes
  - Flauta – Mexican dish
  - Crispy taco – Type of Mexican-American taco
  - Tortilla chip – Snack food made from corn tortillas
  - Tostada (tortilla) – Flat or bowl-shaped tortilla that is deep-fried or toasted — sometimes deep fried
- Crisp-fried onions
  - Blooming onion – Culinary dish
  - Onion ring – Deep-fried battered onion slices
- Deep-fried avocado – Dish made with avocado
- Fried pickle – Snack food made by deep-frying sliced battered dill pickles
- Gobi manchurian – Deep-fried savory dish in Indo-Chinese cuisine
- Jalapeño popper – Breaded, fried, stuffed jalapeño pepper
- Kelewele – Cooked dish made from plantains
- Okra – Species of edible plant
- Olive all'ascolana – Italian appetizer
- Peixinhos da horta – Portuguese fried vegetable-based dish
- Peperoni cruschi – Variety of dry pepper typical of Lucanian cuisine
- Tostones – Fried plantain found in Latin American and Caribbean cuisine
- Vegetable chips – Thin bite-sized snack food made from vegetables
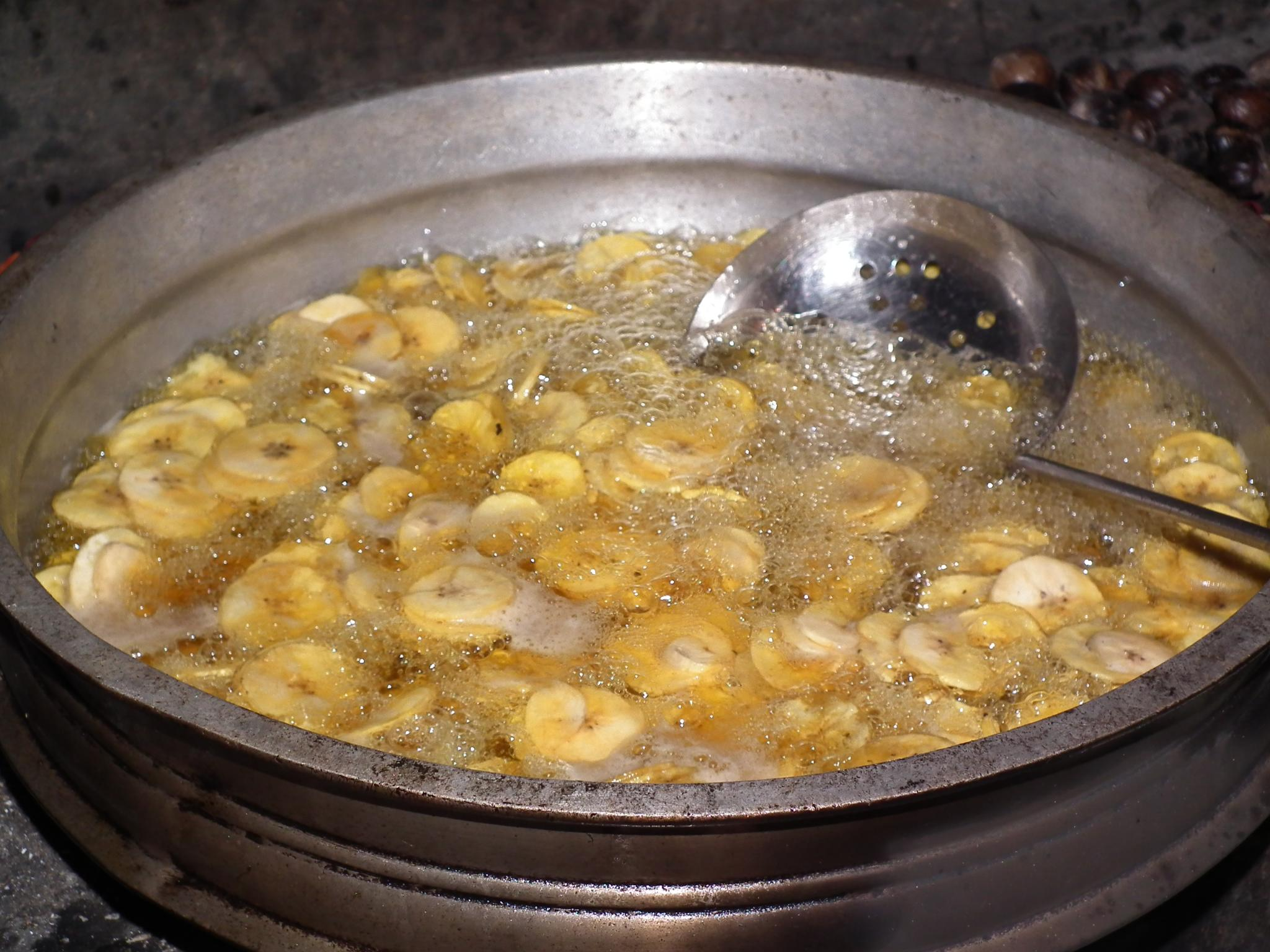
Banana chips being prepared by deep frying

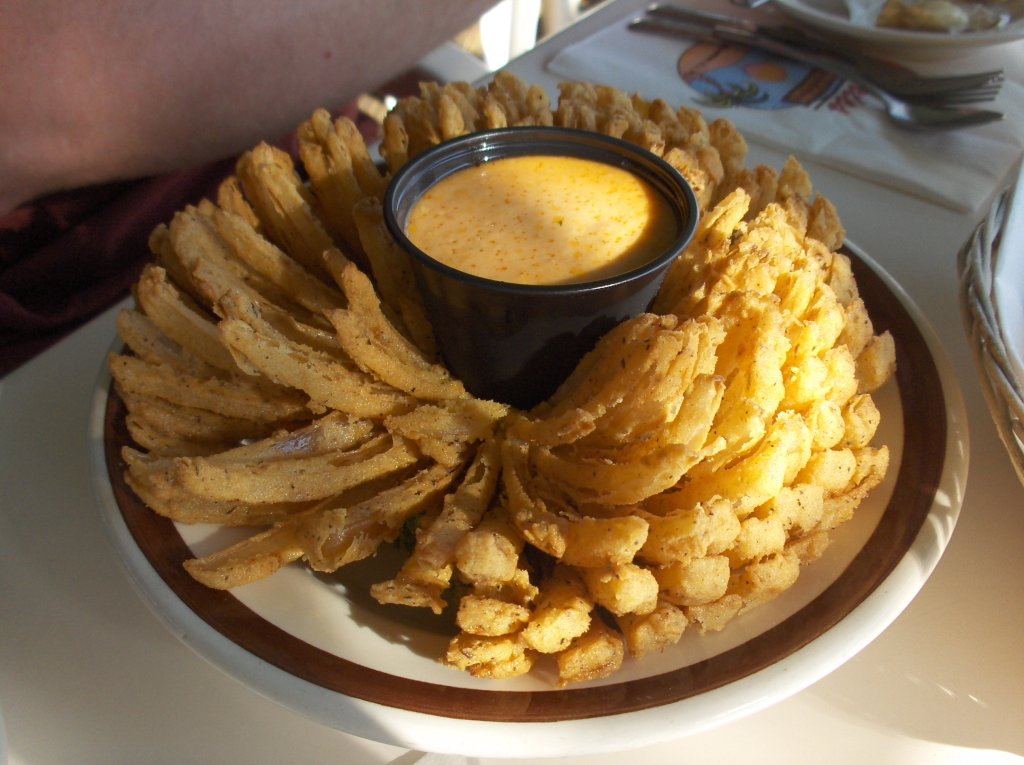
A blooming onion consists of one large onion which is cut to resemble a flower, battered and deep-fried.

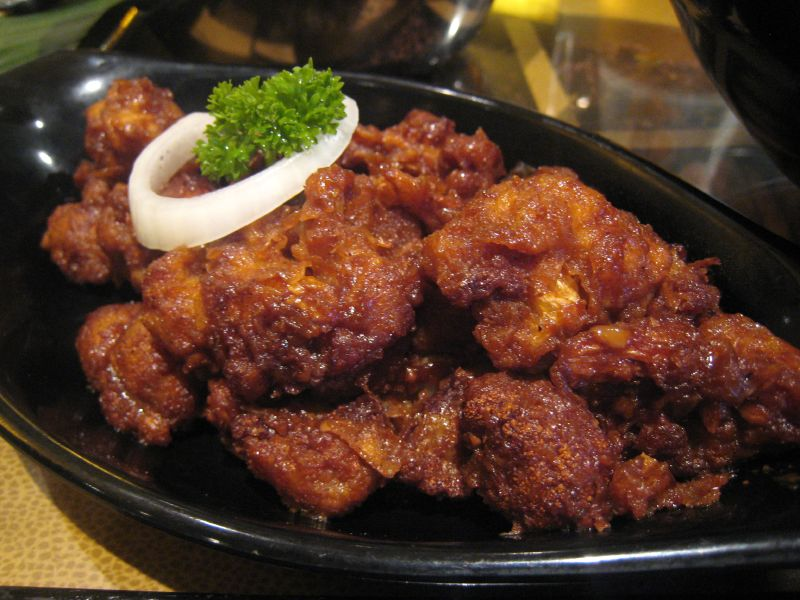
Gobi manchurian is an Indian Chinese fried cauliflower food item popular in India.

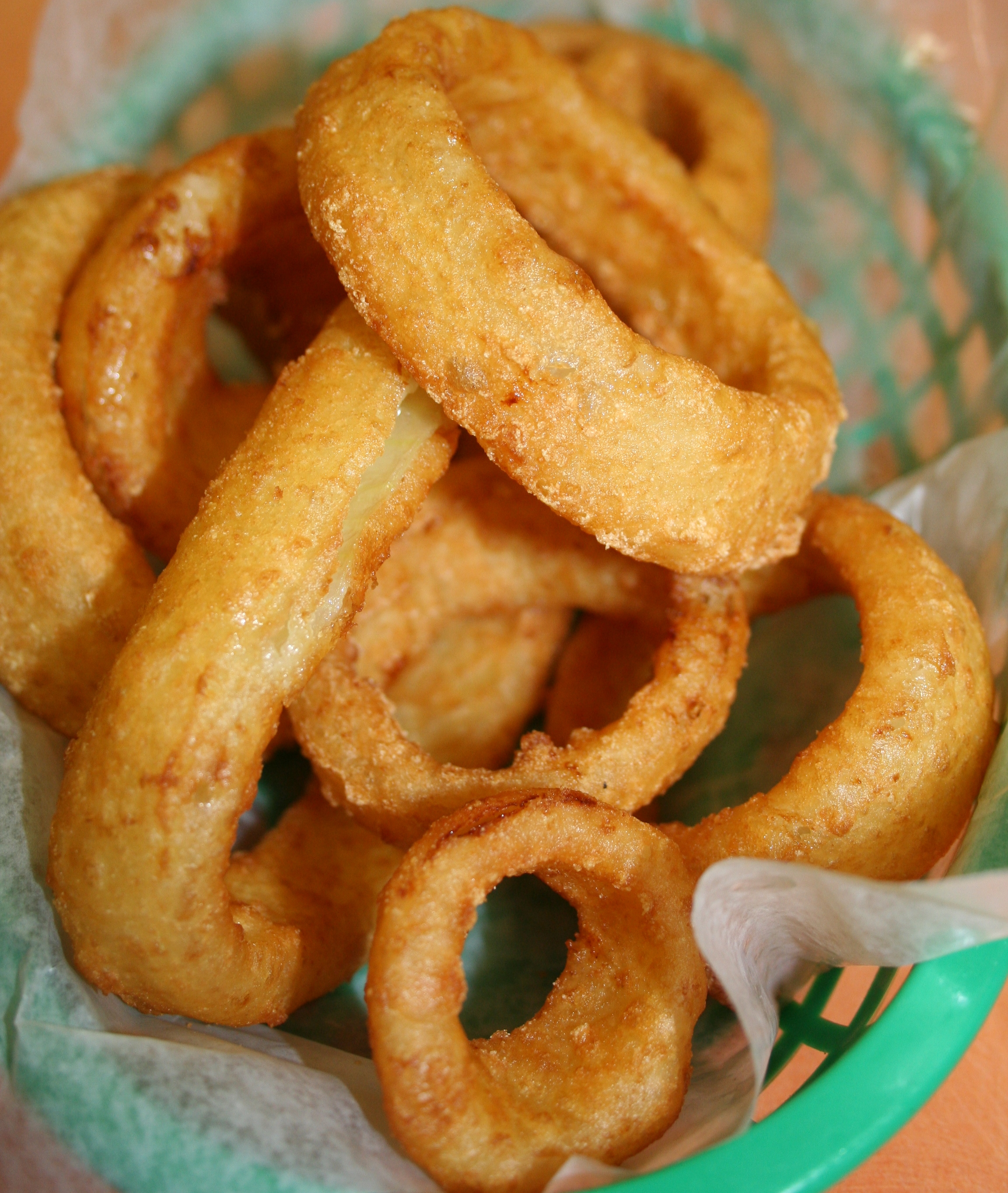
Onion rings are a form of hors d'oeuvre or side dish that generally consist of a cross-sectional, deep fried ring of onion.

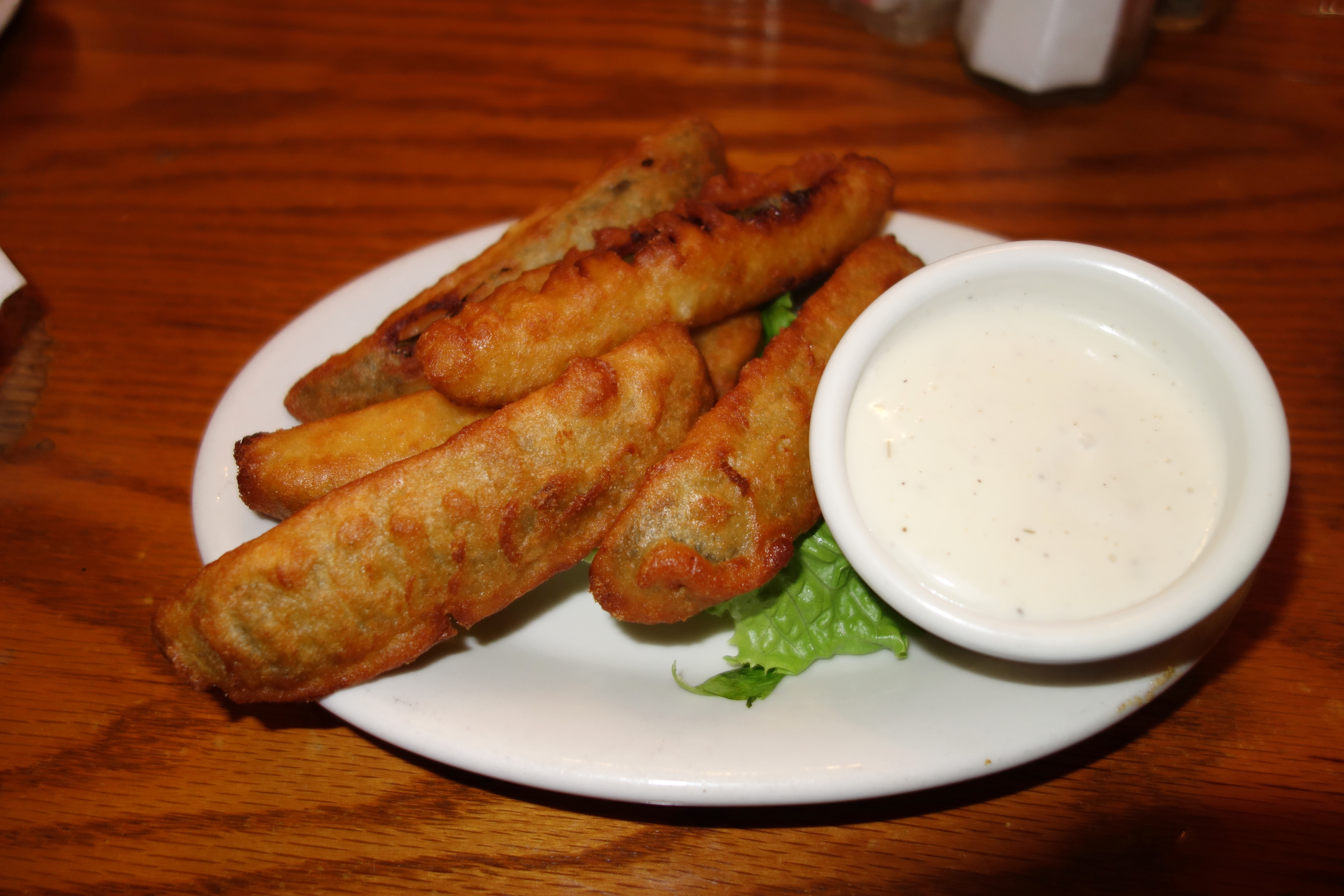
Fried pickles with sauce

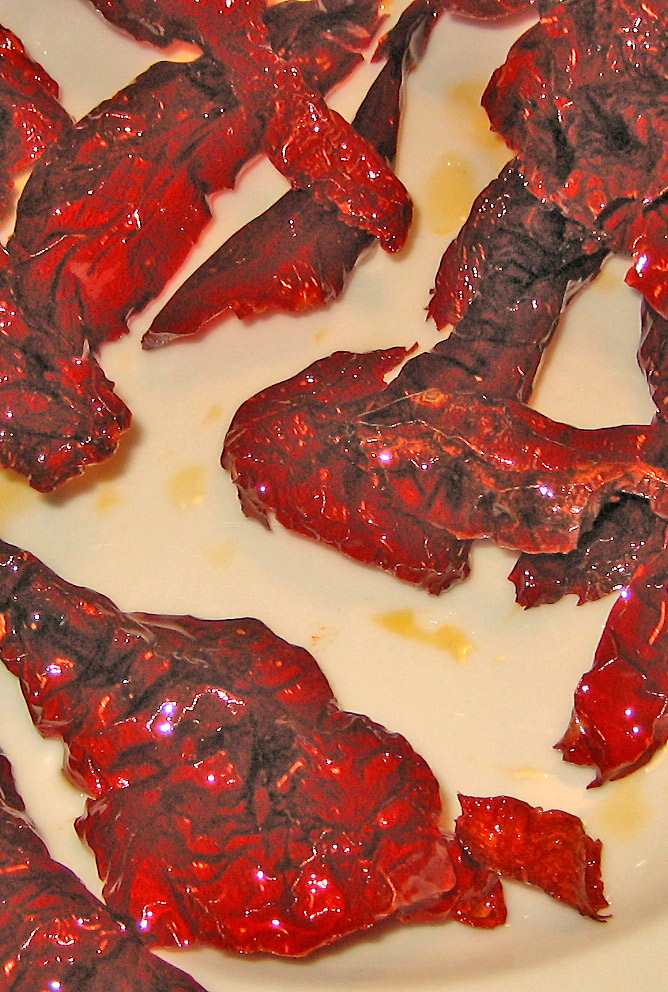
Peperoni cruschi are a type of dried peppers typical of the Italian Basilicata region. They are generally deep fried in olive oil for few seconds and consumed as a seasoning or served as vegetable chips.

==== Potato ====
- Curly fries – Variation of french fries
- French fries – Deep-fried strips of potato
- Fried sweet potato – Dishes including sweet potato fries
- German fries – Thinly sliced raw or cooked potatoes fried in fat
- Hash browns – Fried potato dish
- Home fries – Potato dish
- Pommes dauphine – Potato dish
- Pommes soufflées – Fried potato dish
- Potato chip – Thinly sliced potatoes, deep-fried or baked
- Potato pancake – Shallow-fried pancakes of grated or ground potato

- Boxty – Traditional Irish potato pancake

- Savoury pattie – Deep fried mashed potato
- Tater Tots – Deep-fried grated potato cylinders
- Tornado potato – South Korean street food
- Triple Cooked Chips – Type of deep-fried potato
- Waffle fries – Deep-fried strips of potato
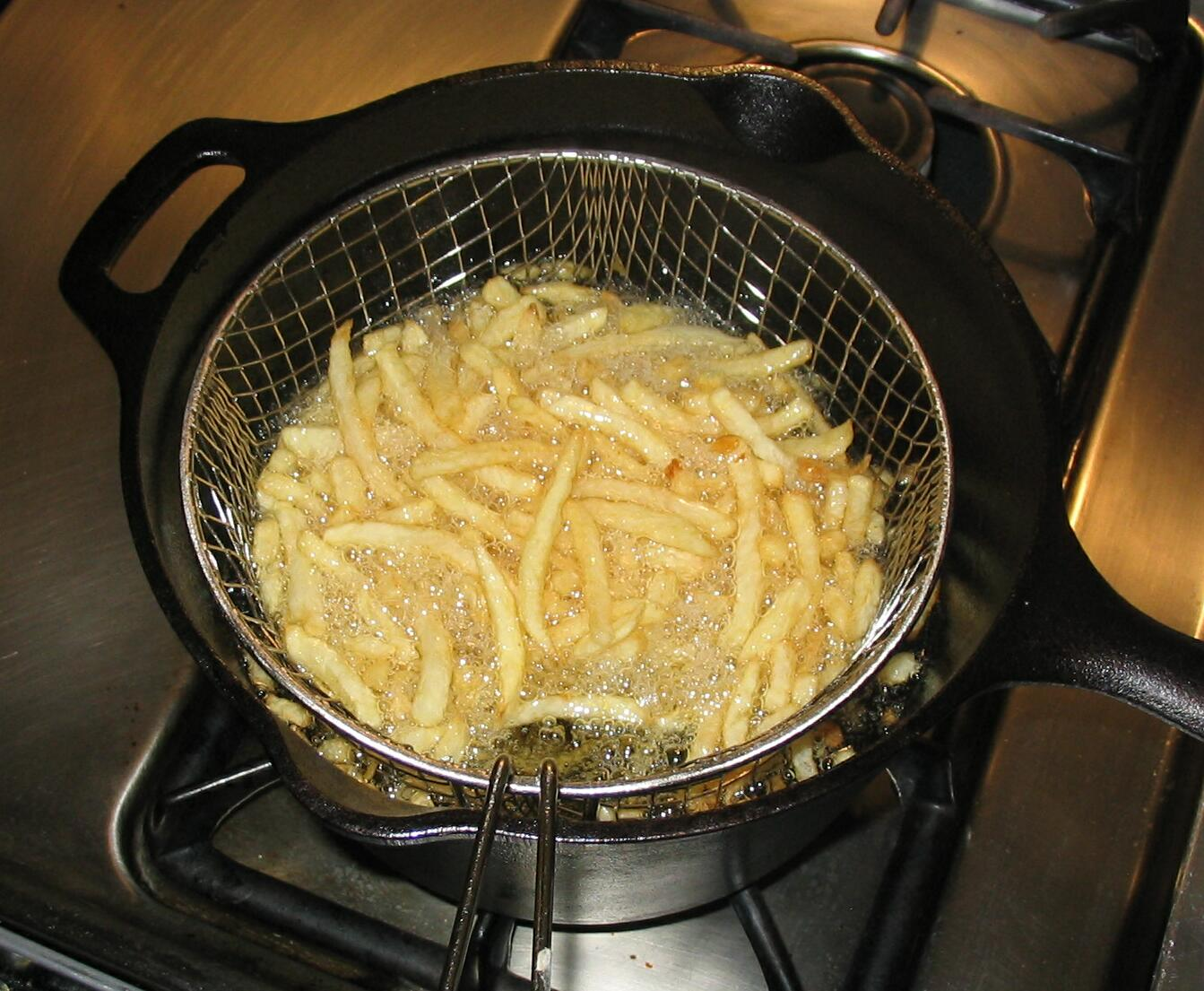
French fries being deep fried

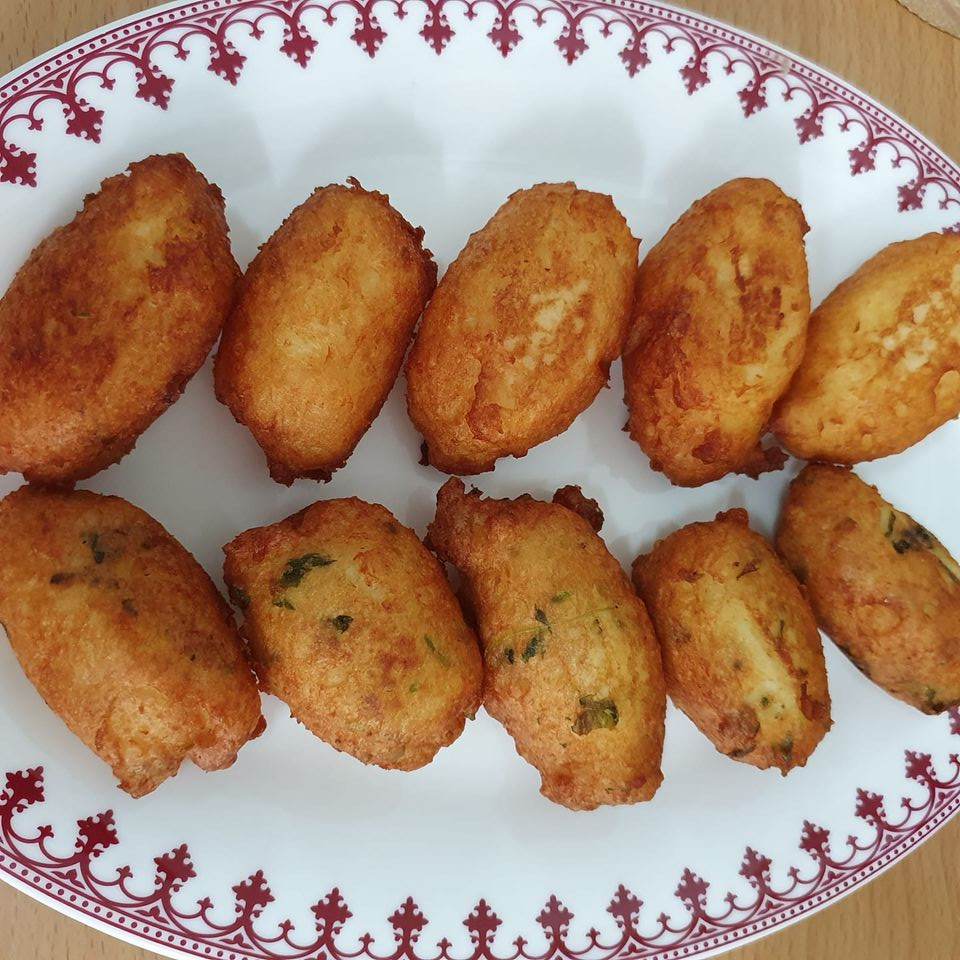
Pommes dauphine

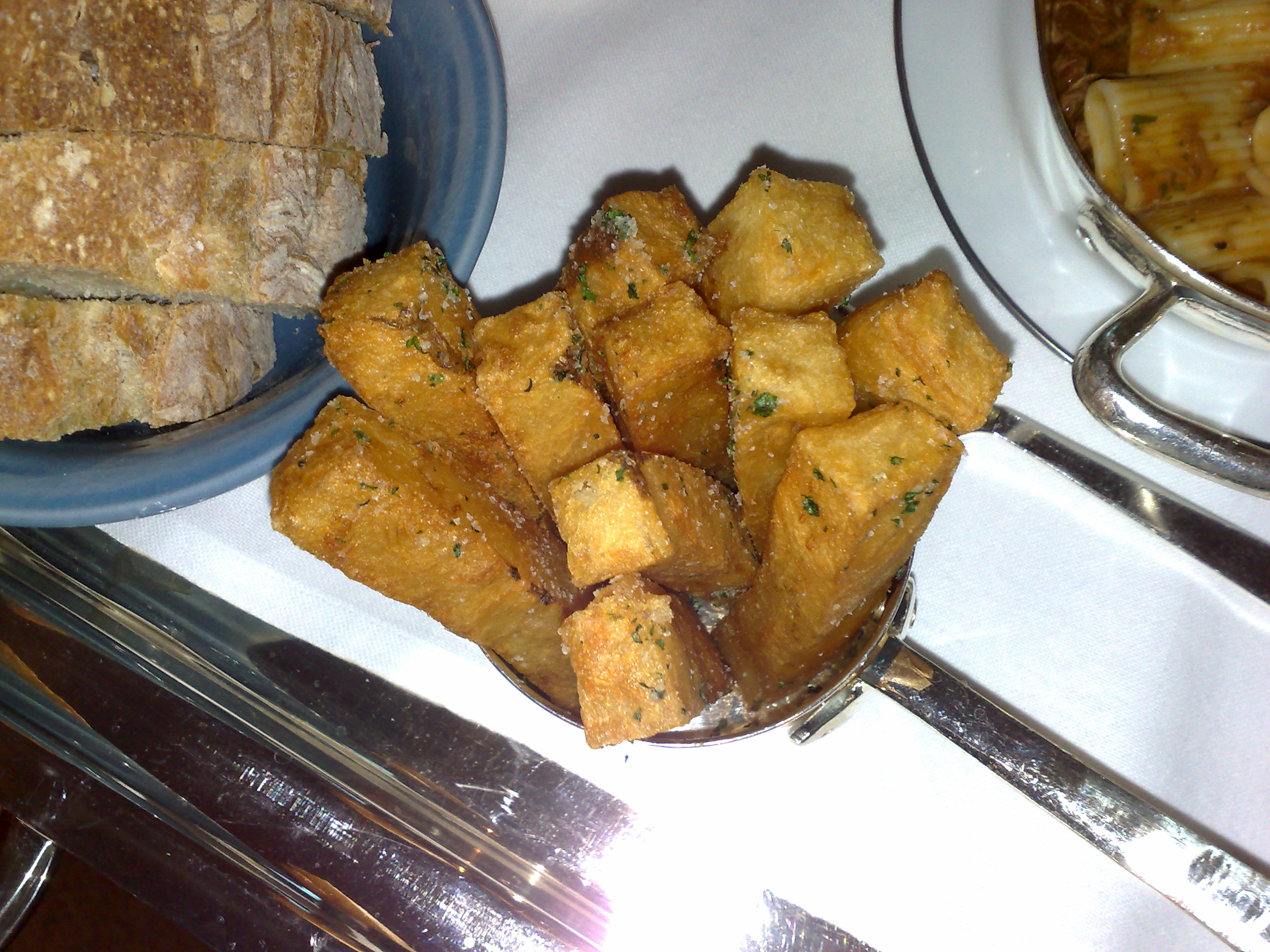
Triple Cooked Chips fried in duck fat served at a restaurant

=== Pork ===
- Chicharrón – Pork dish of Spanish origin
- Chicken fried bacon – American fried bacon dish
- Crispy pata – Filipino dish
- King Rib – British minced pork patty
- Oreilles de crisse – Quebec dish (food)
- Taro dumpling – Chinese cuisine
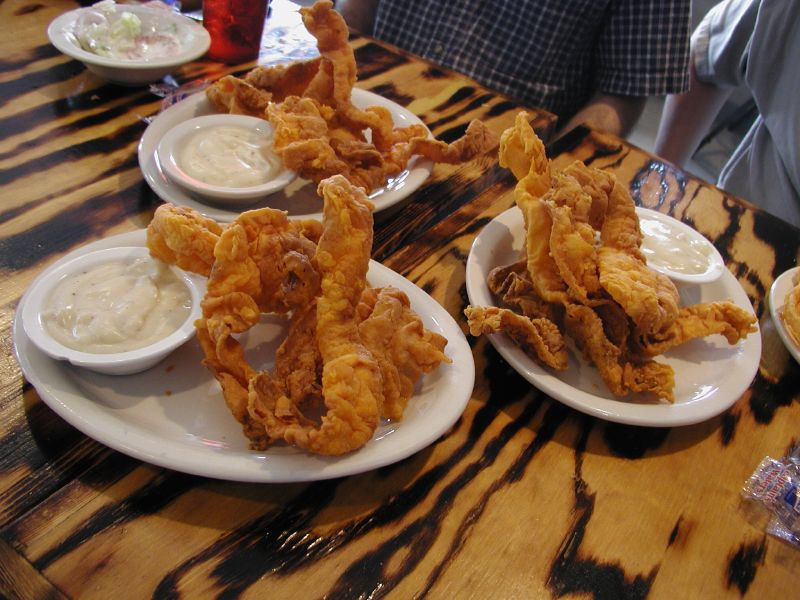
Chicken fried bacon

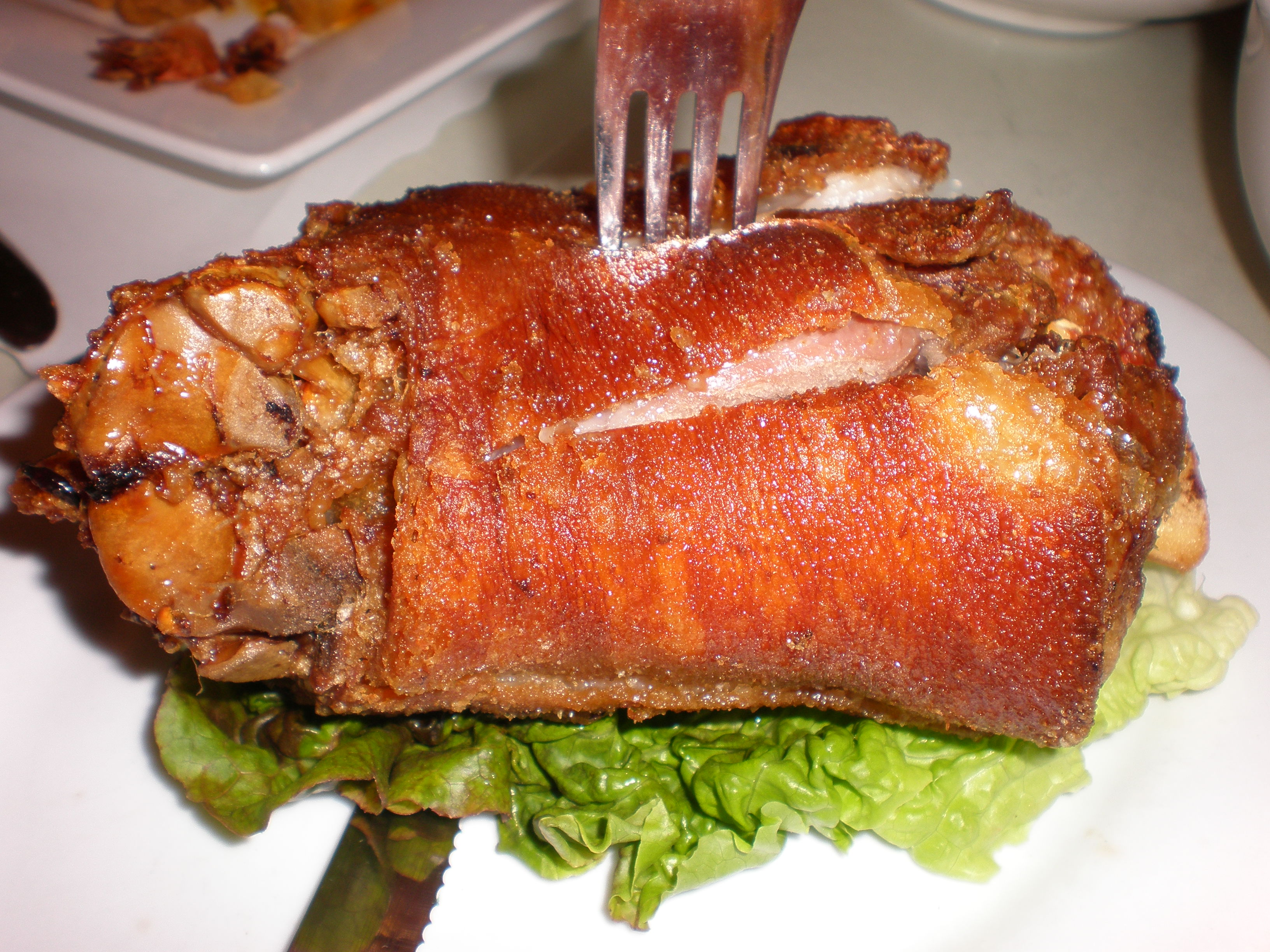
Crispy pata

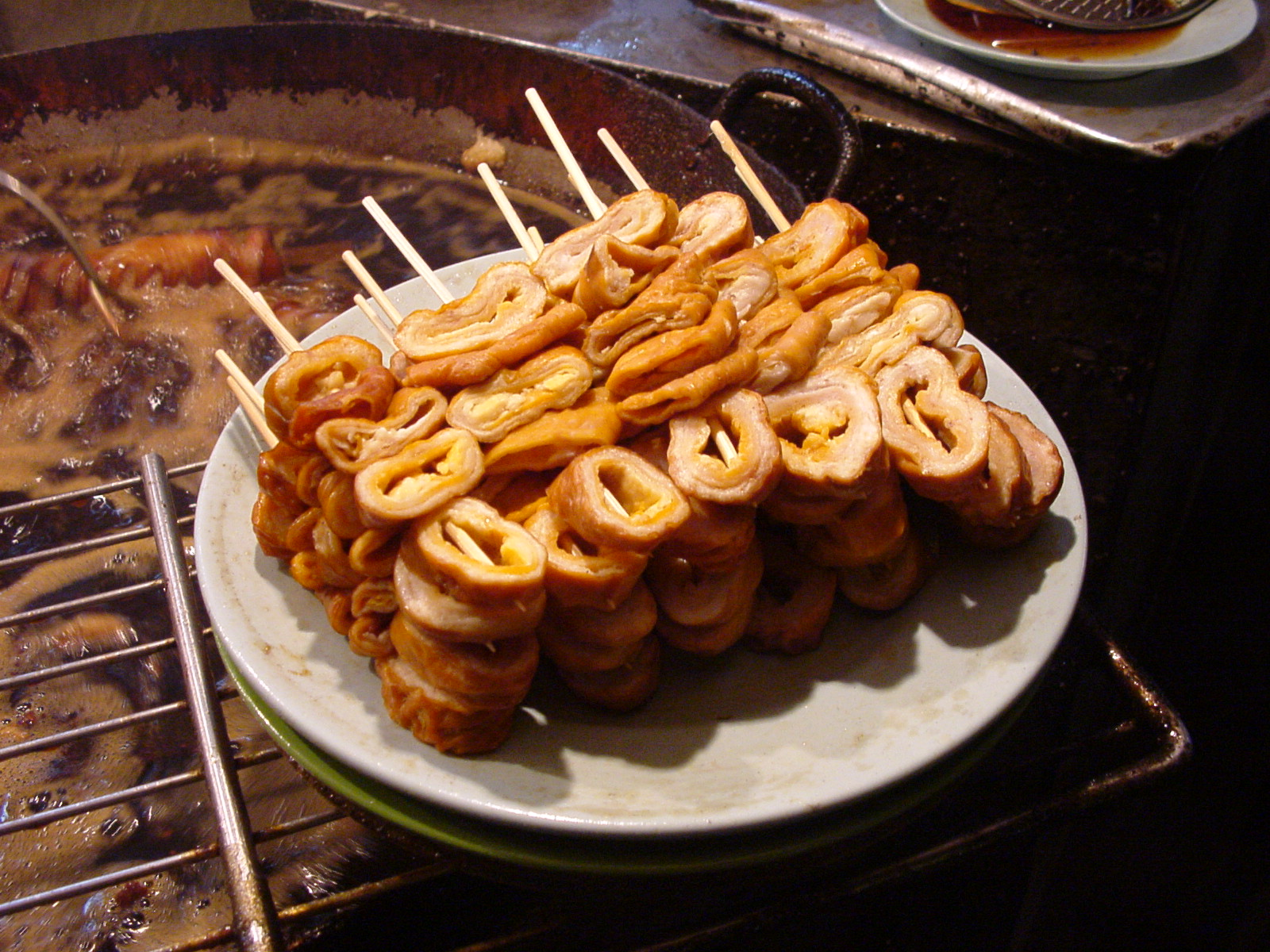
Deep fried pork intestines

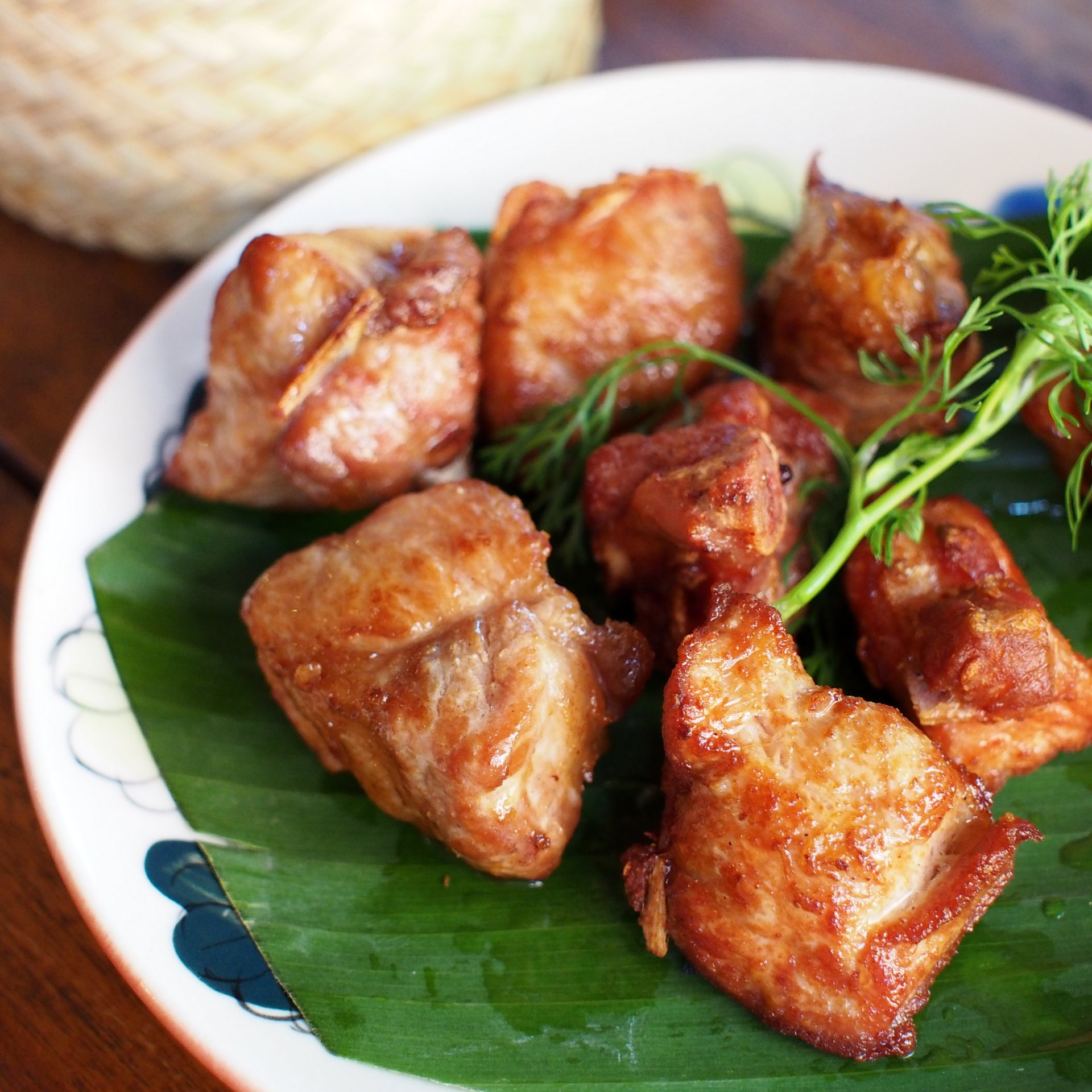
Si khrong mu thot are Thai deep fried pork ribs.

=== Tofu ===
- Aburaage – Deep-fried tofu slices
- Agedashi dōfu
- Fried tofu – Southeast Asian fried tofu dish
- Stinky tofu – Chinese fermented tofu with a strong odor - sometimes deep fried
- Tahu goreng
- Tahu sumedang
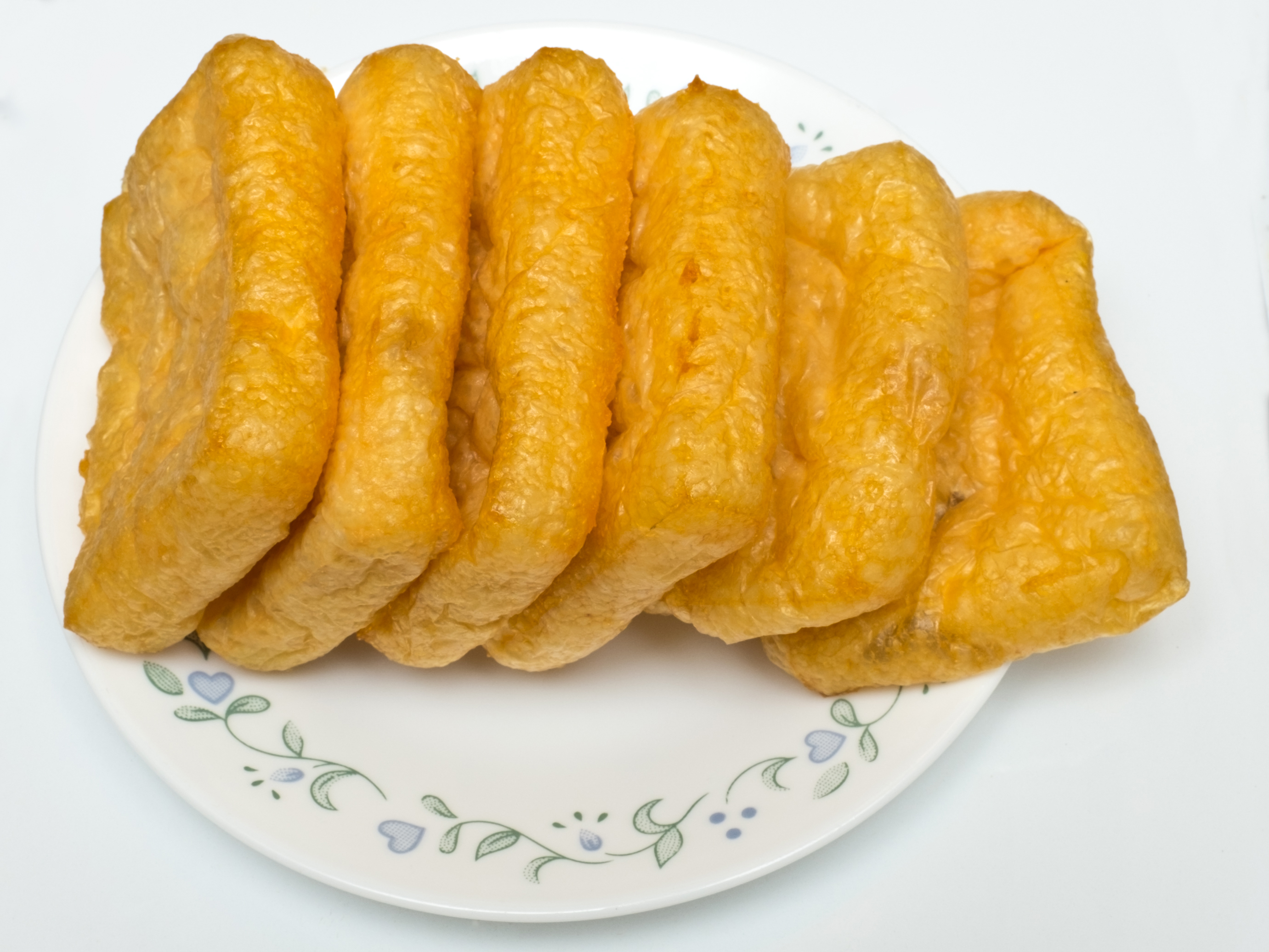
Aburaage is a Japanese food product made from soybeans. It is produced by cutting tofu into thin slices and deep frying first at 110~120 °C, and then again at 180~200 °C.

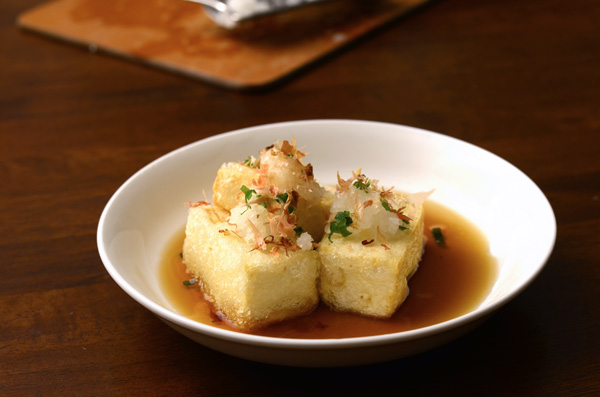
Agedashi dōfu is tofu coated with potato starch and deep-fried.

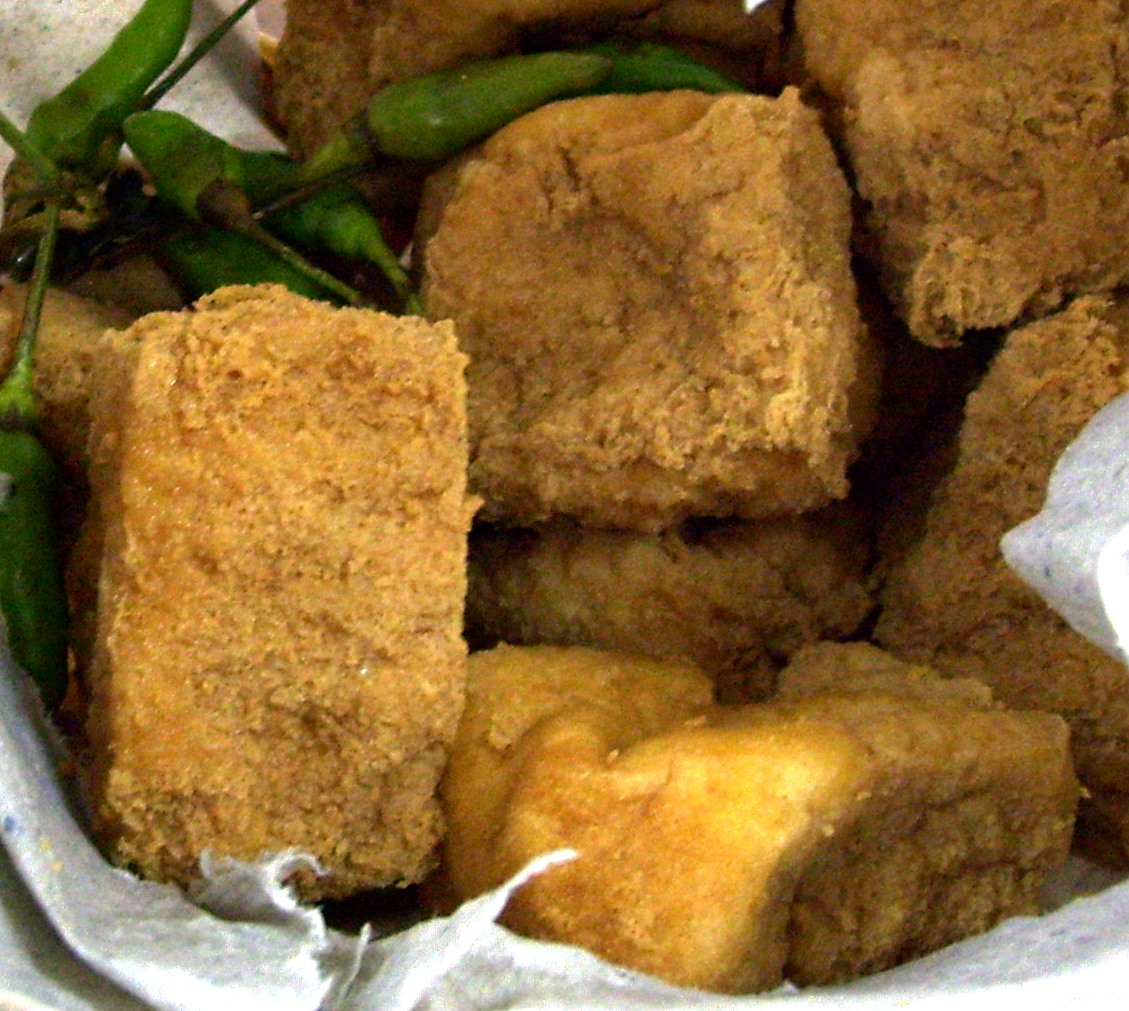
Tahu sumedang is a Sundanese deep fried tofu from Sumedang, West Java.

=== Other ===
- Hamburger

== By cuisine ==
=== Chinese cuisine ===
==== Cantonese ====
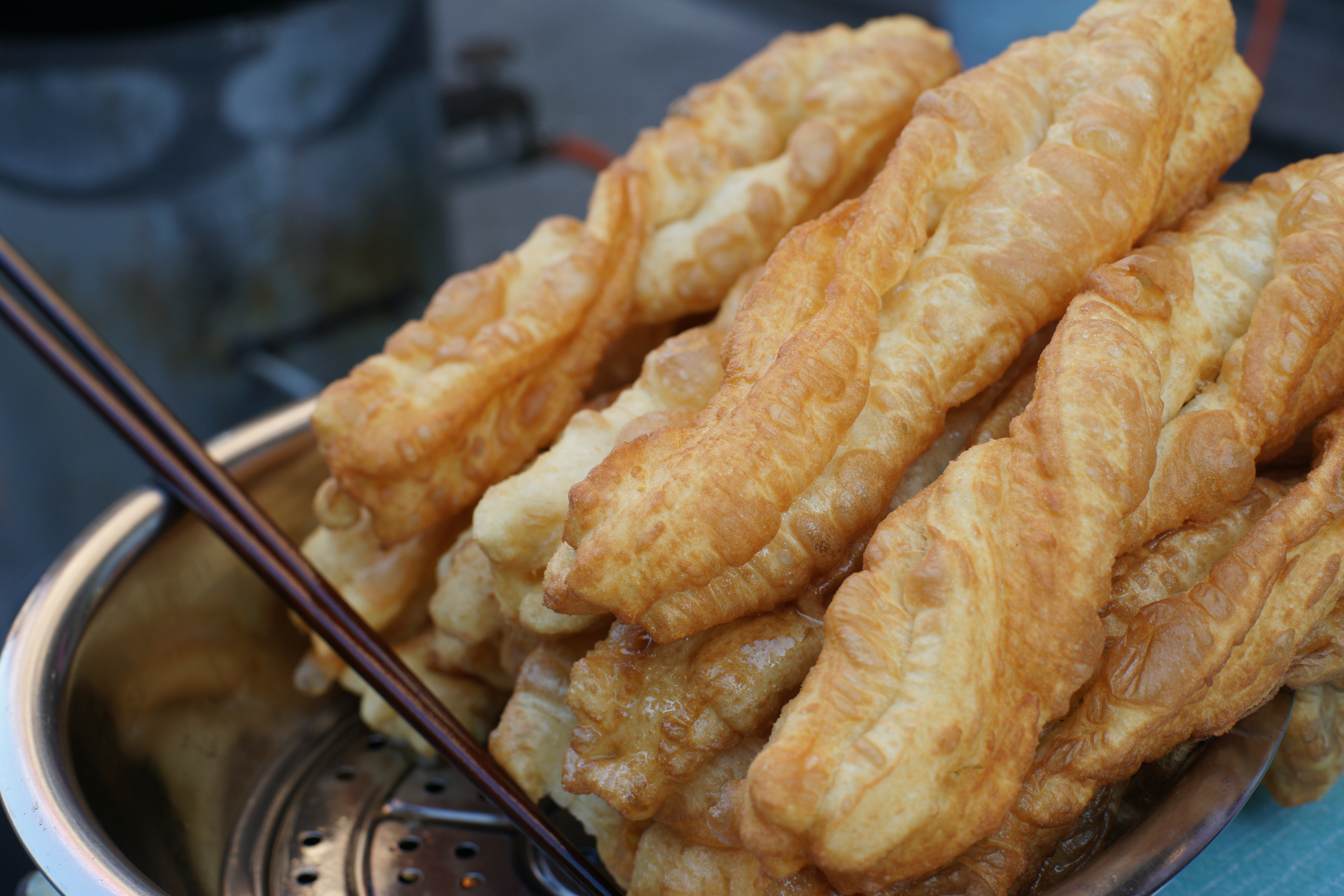
Youtiao (fried dough or bread)

- Dace fish balls
- Deep-fried marinated pigeon
- Yau Zaa Gwai – Deep-fried pastry of Chinese origin (youtiao)
- Zaa Leung – Cantonese dish

=== Japanese cuisine ===
- Agemono (揚げ物) – Deep-fried dishes
  - Karaage (唐揚げ) – bite-sized pieces of chicken, fish, octopus, or other meat, floured and deep fried. Common izakaya (居酒屋) food, also often available in convenience stores.
    - Nanbanzuke (南蛮漬け) – marinated fried fish
  - Korokke (croquette コロッケ) – breaded and deep-fried patties, containing either mashed potato or white sauce mixed with minced meat, vegetables or seafood. A popular everyday food.
  - Kushikatsu (串カツ) – skewered meat, vegetables or seafood, breaded and deep fried
  - Tempura (天ぷら) – deep-fried vegetables or seafood in a light, distinctive batter
  - Tonkatsu (豚カツ) – deep-fried breaded cutlet of pork (chicken versions are called chicken katsu)
- Agedashi dofu (揚げ出し豆腐) – cubes of deep-fried silken tofu served in hot broth
- Tenkasu – Crunchy bits of deep-fried flour batter used in Japanese cuisine
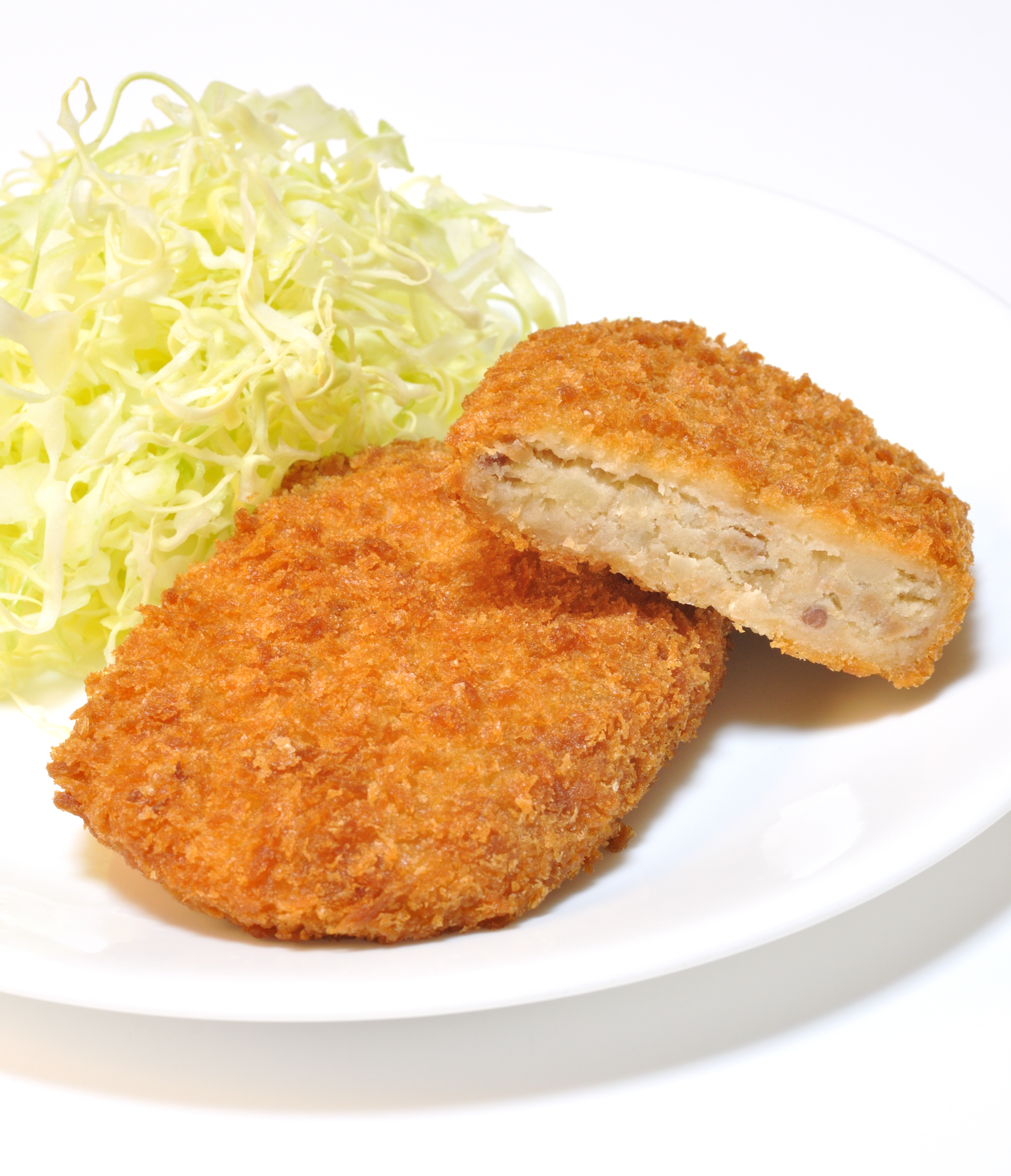
Korokke is the Japanese name for a deep-fried dish originally related to a French dish, the croquette.

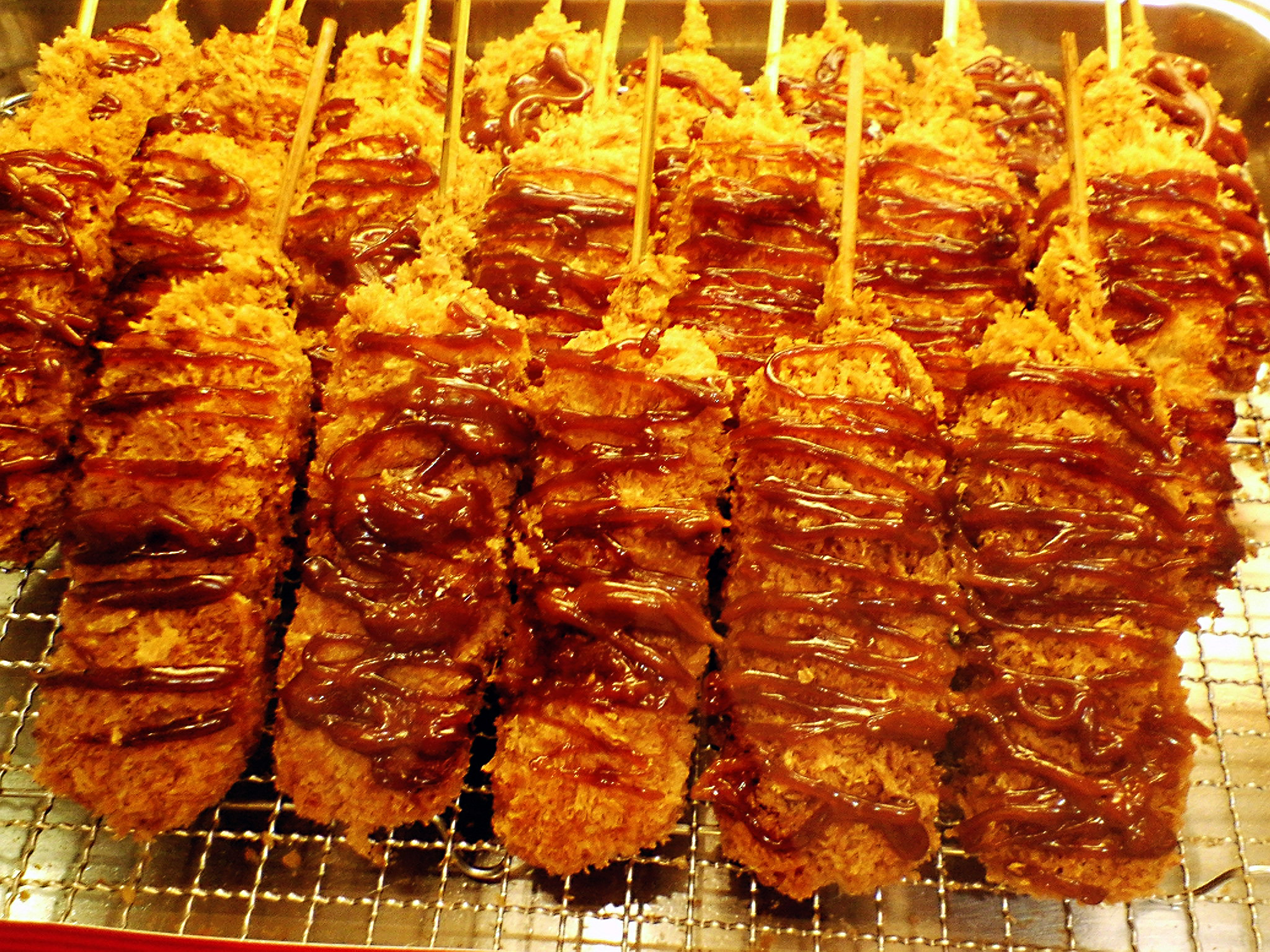
Skewers of kushikatsu with miso sauce

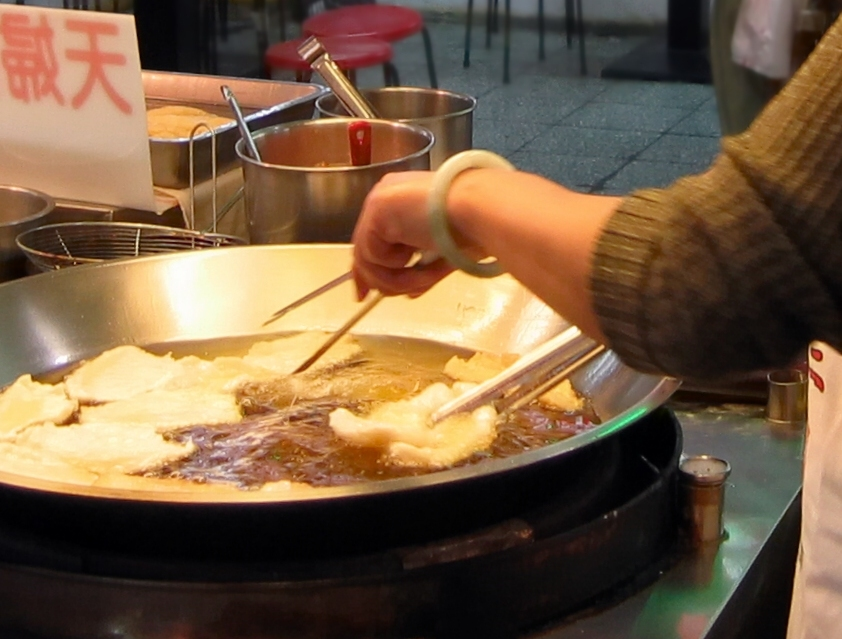
Tempura being prepared

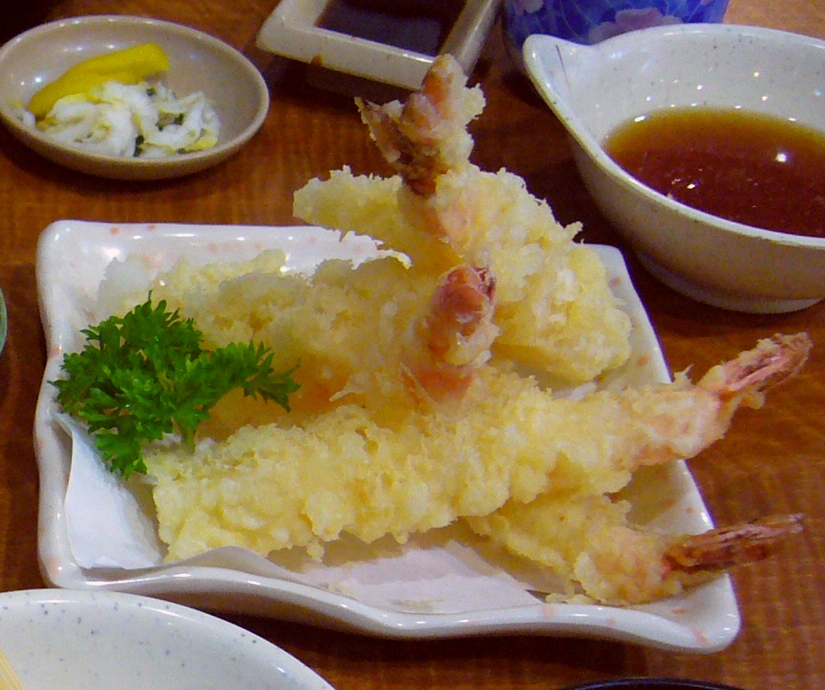
Ebi tempura

== See also ==
- Fish fry
- Fried chicken restaurant
- Fried fish
- Frietmuseum
- List of fried dough foods
- List of fried chicken dishes
- List of hors d'oeuvre
- Lists of prepared foods
- National Fried Chicken Day
