= Chip (snack) =

Snack food made of a crispy bite-sized units

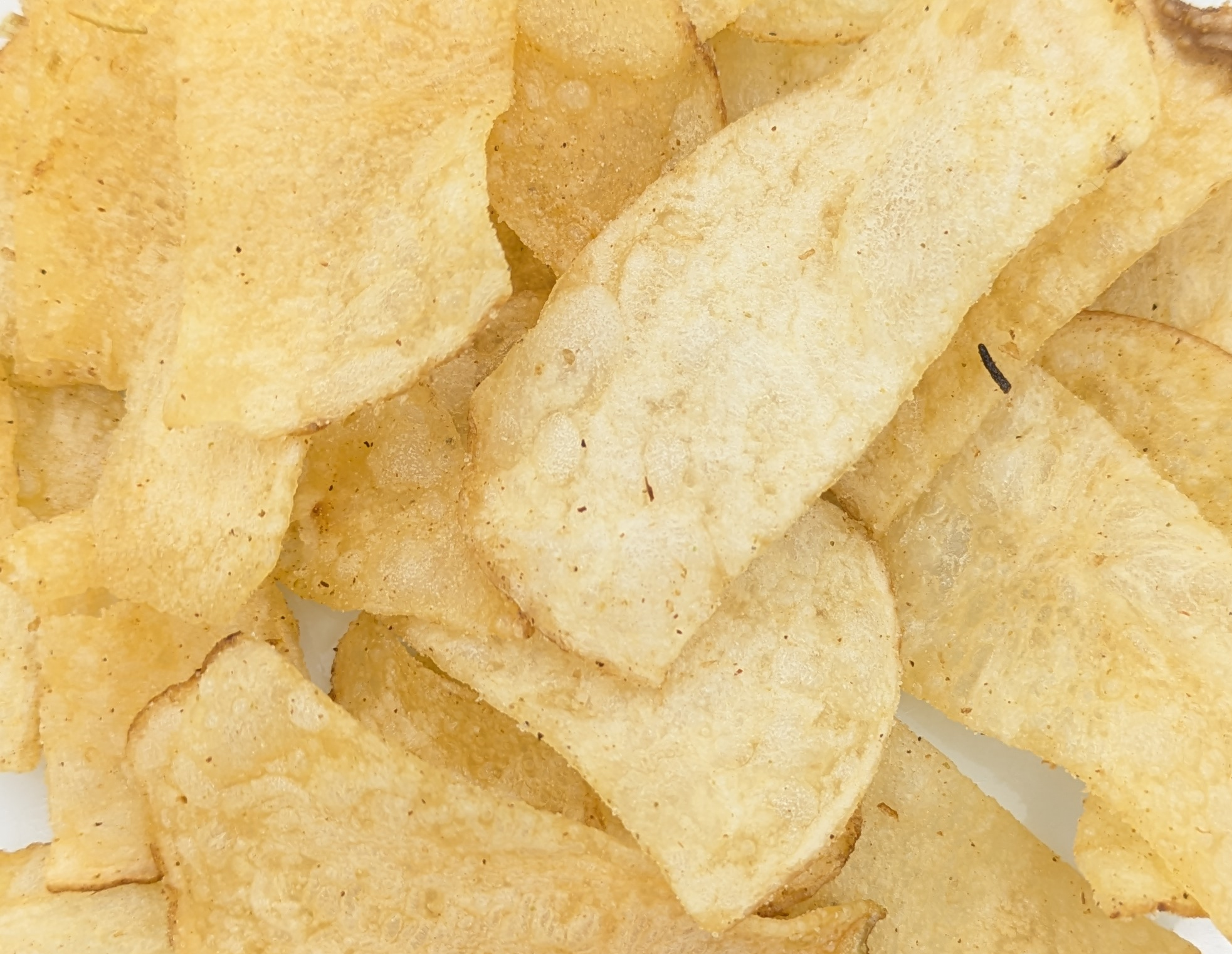
Fried chips (or crisps) made from potatoes

A chip (American English and Australian English) or crisp (British English) is a snack food in the form of a crisp, flat or slightly bowl shaped, bite-sized unit. Chips are typically fried, though sometimes baked.

Some chips can be made into dishes and served as a side, hors d'oeuvre, etc. Some types of chip are often served in the combination plate known as chip and dip. Tortilla chips can be used in nachos or with salsa, bean dip, guacamole, or a layered dip containing multiple of these. Other chips are sweet or strongly flavored or fragile.

== Popular kinds of chip ==
=== Root chips ===
- Potato chips, a thin slice of potato that has been deep fried or baked until it gets crunchy.
- Tapioca chips, a snack food made from thin wafers of deep fried cassava roots.

=== Grain and bean chips ===
- Bean chips, these chips are prepared using beans as a primary ingredient.
- Corn chips, it is a snack food made from cornmeal fried in oil or baked.
- Pita chips, chips made of dried pita.
- Tortilla chips, a snack food that is made from corn tortillas.
- Pretzel, a chip made from flattened and baked pretzel dough.

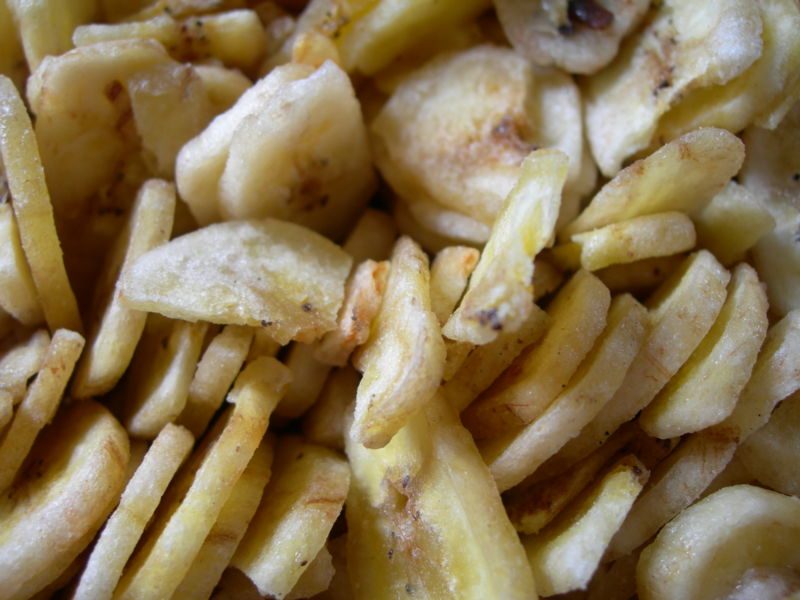
Banana chips

=== Fruit chips (sweet chips) ===
- Banana chips, slices of banana that are fried or dried.
- Plantain chips, a snack made with sliced plantains.

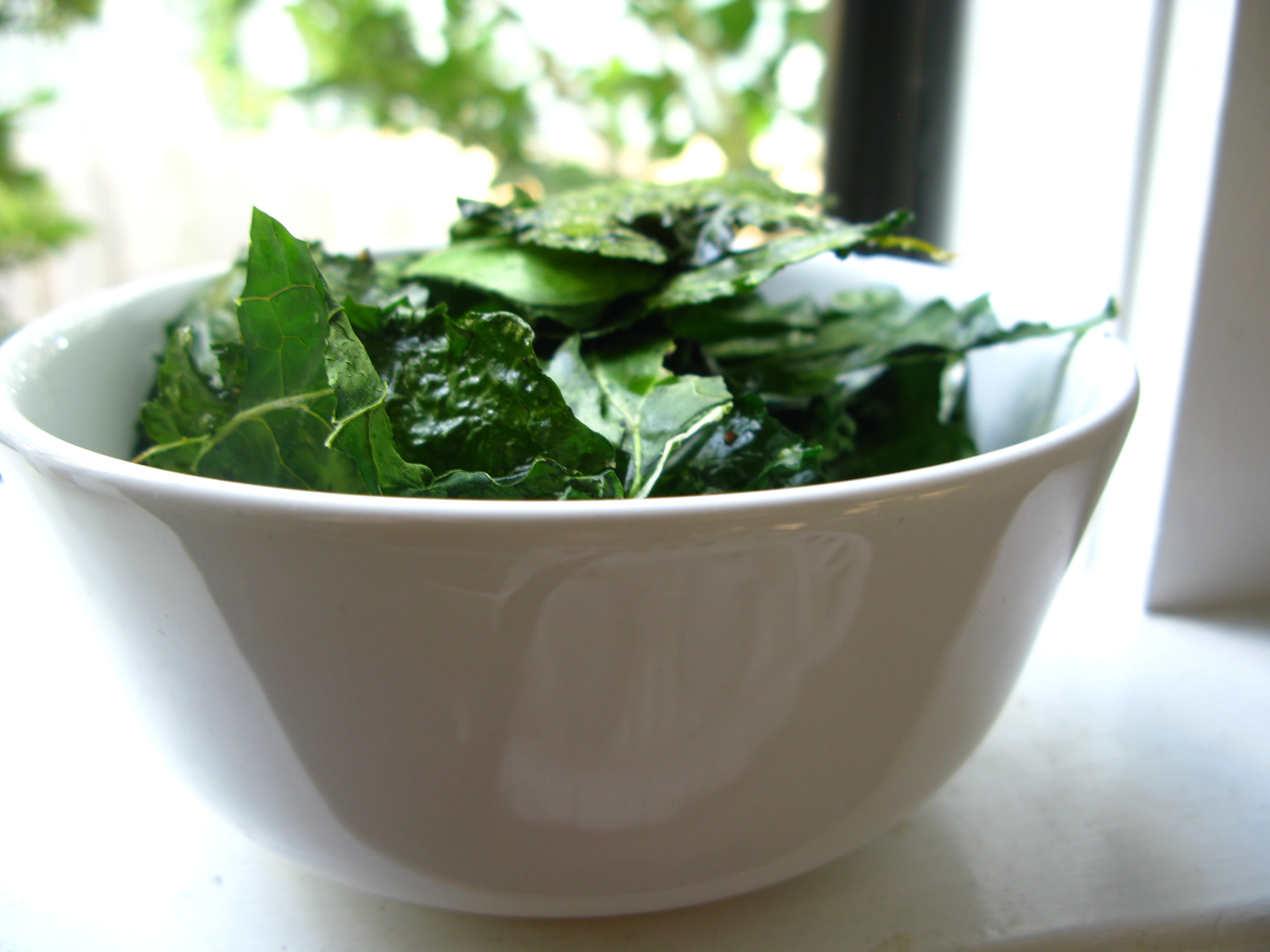
A bowl of kale chips

=== Vegetable chips ===
- Carrot chips, a common term for carrots that have been fried or dehydrated
- Kale chips, snack food made of baked kale

== See also ==
- Popcorn – Type of corn kernel which expands and puffs upon heating
- Cheese puffs – Puffed corn snack
- Cracker (food) – Flat, dry baked cookie
- Chocolate chips – Small chunk of chocolate used as an ingredient
- Kripik – Indonesian chips
