= Vegetable chips =

Thin bite-sized snack food made from vegetables

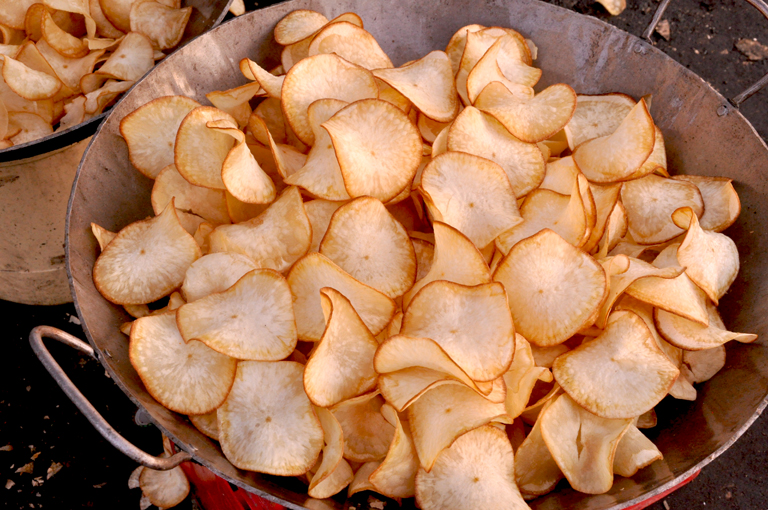
Deep-fried cassava chips

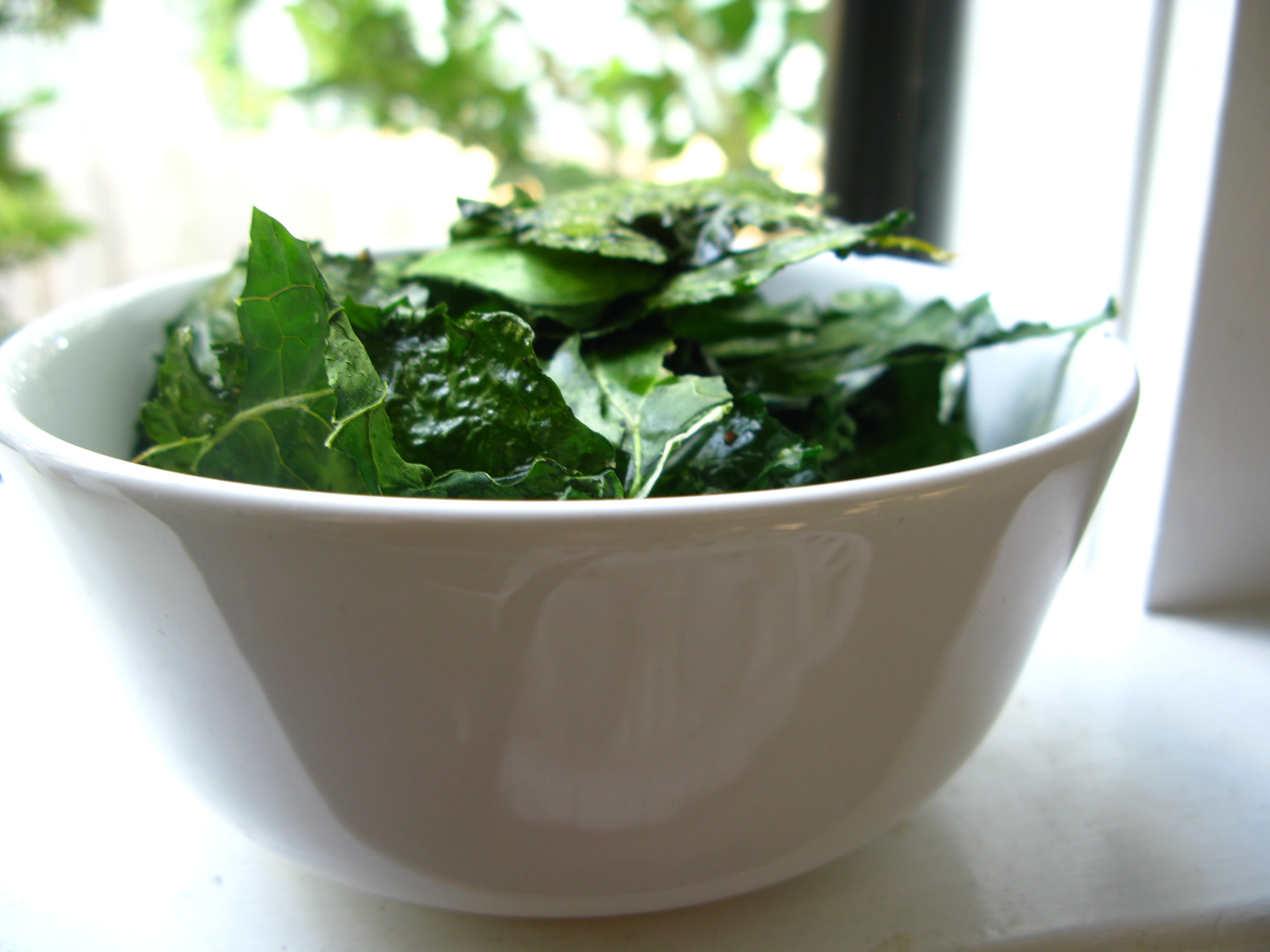
Kale chips

Vegetable chips (also referred to as veggie chips) are chips (crisps) that are prepared using vegetables other than potatoes. Vegetable chips may be fried, deep-fried, dehydrated, dried, or baked. Many different root vegetables or leaf vegetables may be used. Vegetable chips may be eaten as a snack food and may accompany other foods such as dips, or be used as a topping on dishes. In the United States, vegetable chips are often mass-produced, with many brands marketed to consumers.

While potato chips are technically considered "vegetable chips", since they are the most common form of chips, any other kind of vegetable-based chip is grouped in a separate category.

== Preparation and ingredients ==
Vegetable chips may be prepared with sliced vegetables that are fried, deep-fried, baked, dehydrated, or simply dried. Vegetable chips may be produced from a variety of root vegetables and leaf vegetables, such as carrot, turnip, swede, parsnip, parsley root, chervil root, celery root (celeriac), beetroot, radish, Jerusalem artichoke, taro, malanga, eddoe, sweet potato, butternut squash, onion, garlic, courgette, yam, cassava, kale, spinach, fennel, and jicama, among others. Some baked versions utilize vegetables that are sliced, lightly tossed in oil, and then oven-baked until crisp. Vegetable chips prepared using this method have been described as more healthful compared to deep-fried chips, particularly when prepared using "heart-healthy" olive oil.

Simple versions are prepared by slicing vegetables and drying them, without any cooking involved. Sometimes a mandoline is used to slice vegetables for vegetable chips, which can accommodate thin slicing and enhance size consistency. Vegetable chips may be flavored with spices such as salt, sea salt, pepper, cajun spice, curry, allspice, chipotle powder, sweet or smoked paprika, adobo seasoning, dried chives, and many others. Mass-produced varieties may contain food preservatives or monosodium glutamate. Vegetable chips can be homemade using various recipes and preparation processes.

Vegetable chips

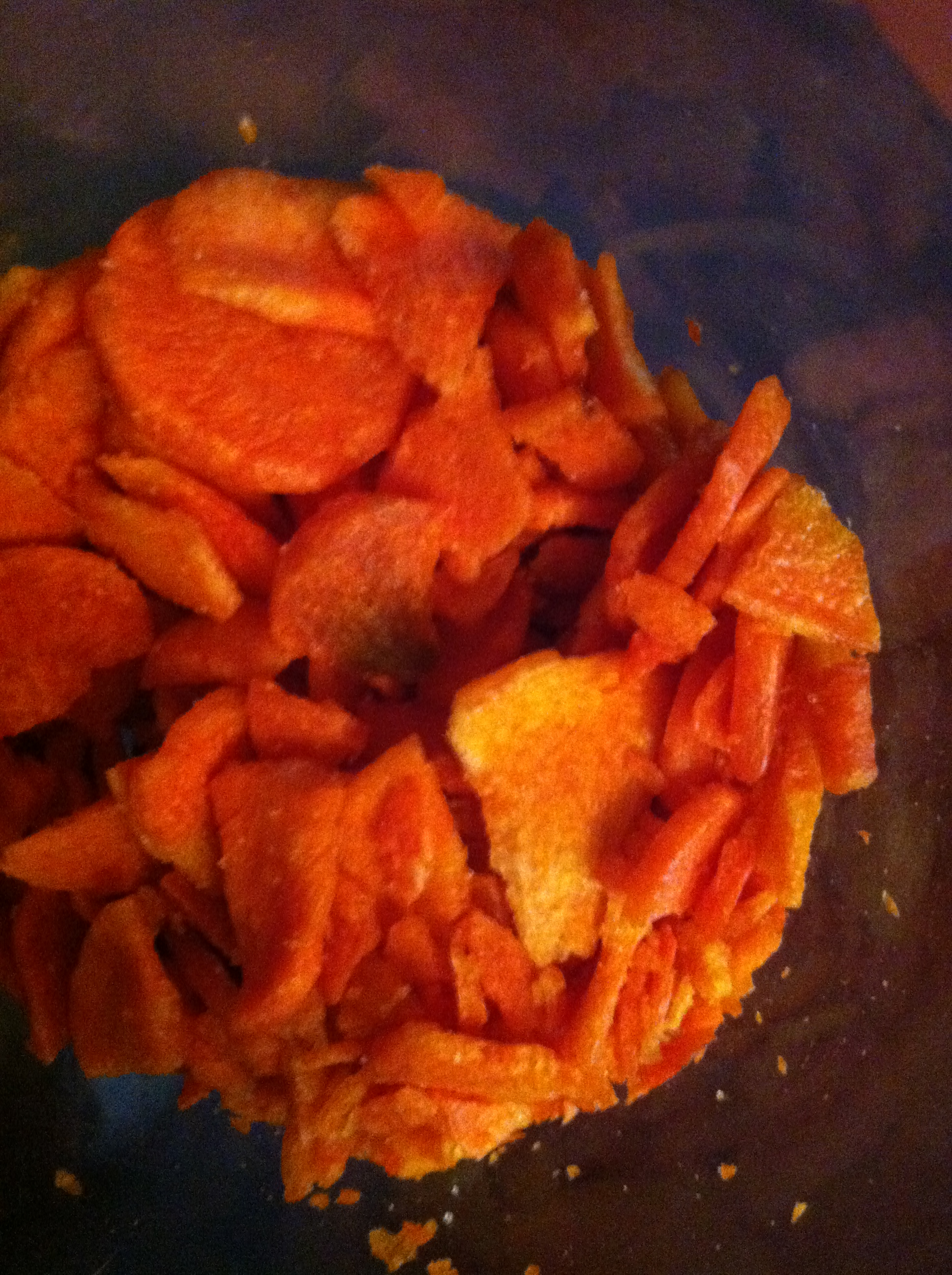
Carrot chips

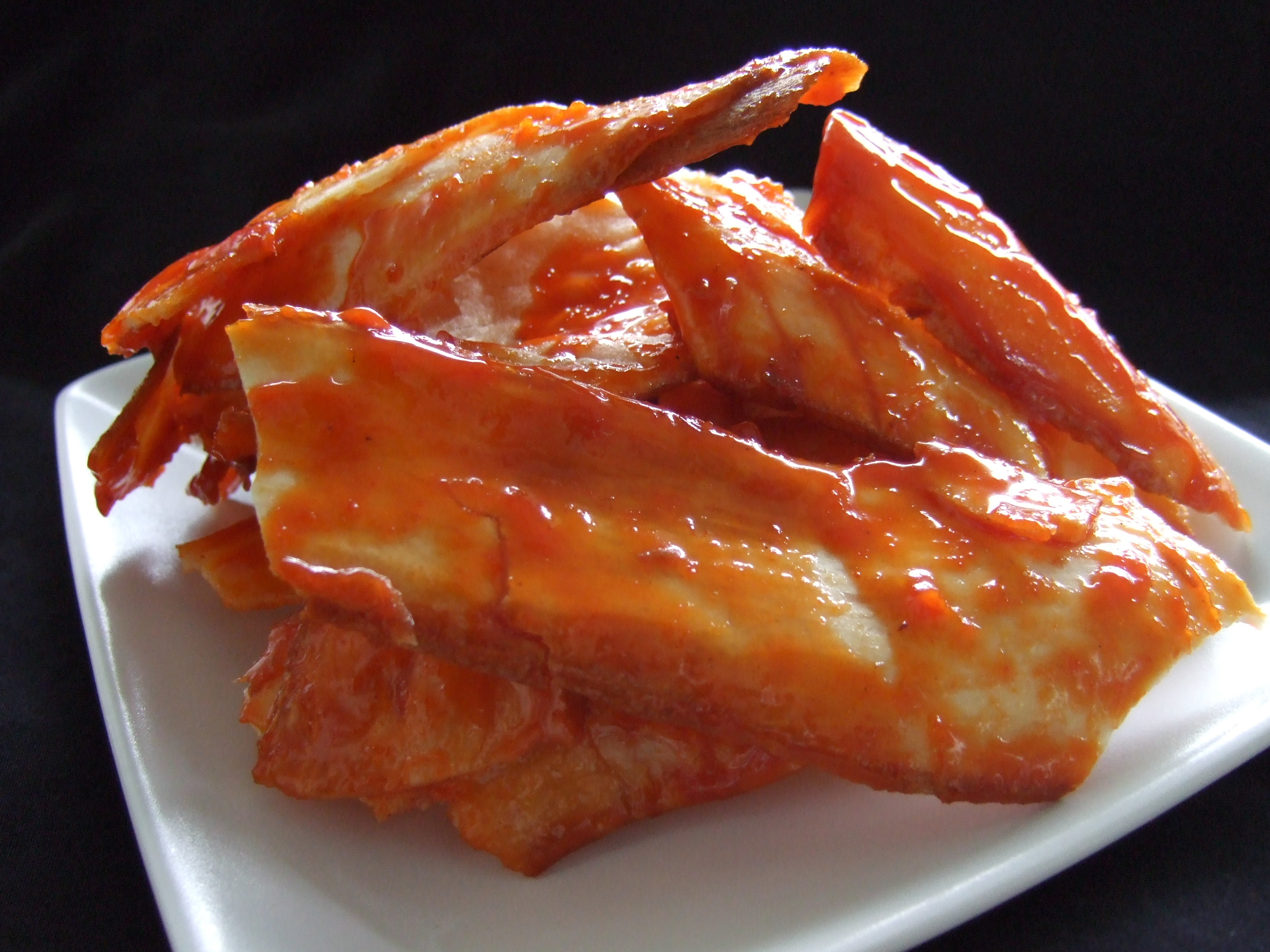
Cassava chips in chili sauce in Bandar Lampung, Indonesia

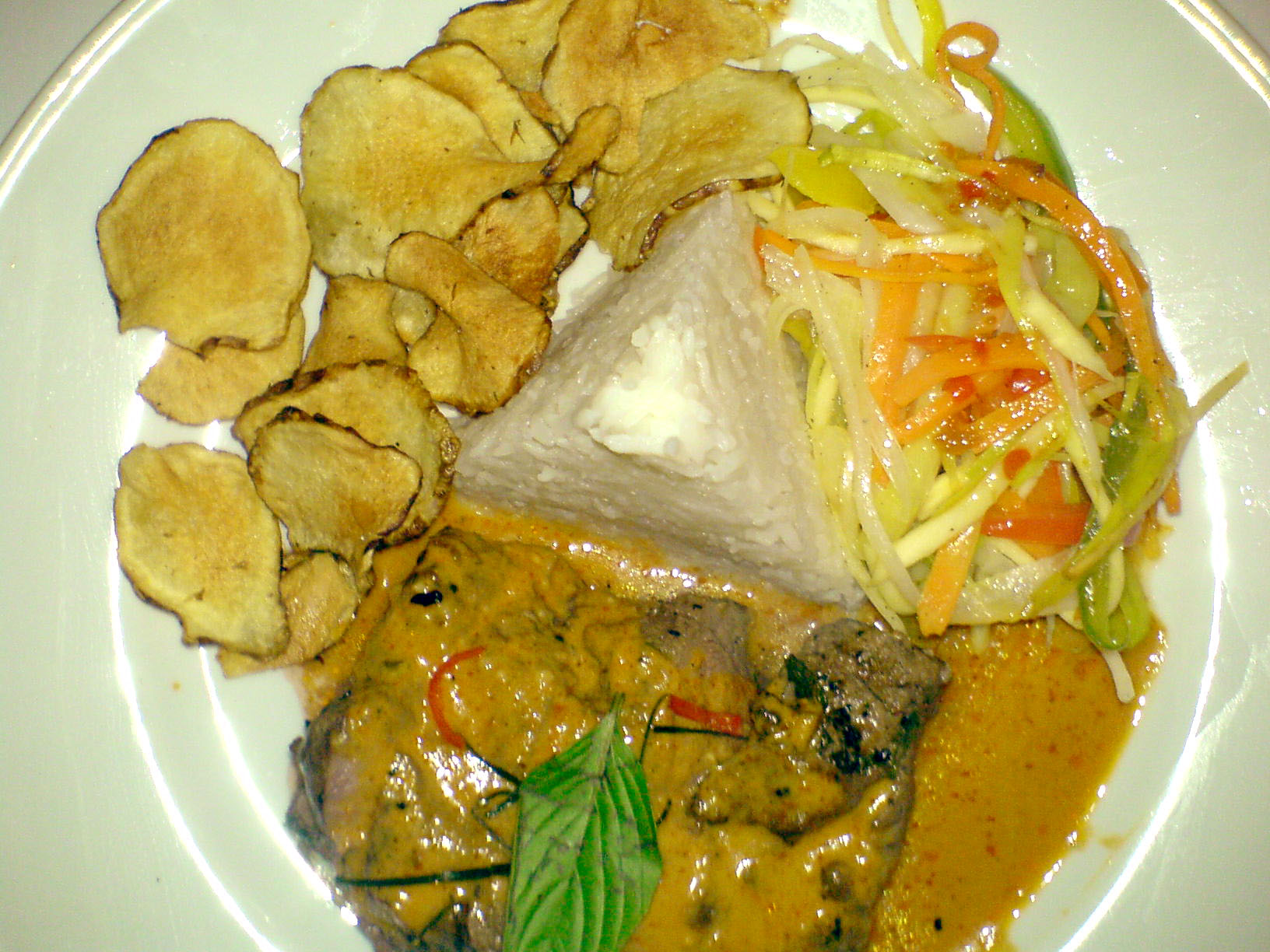
Jerusalem artichoke chips (at top-left)

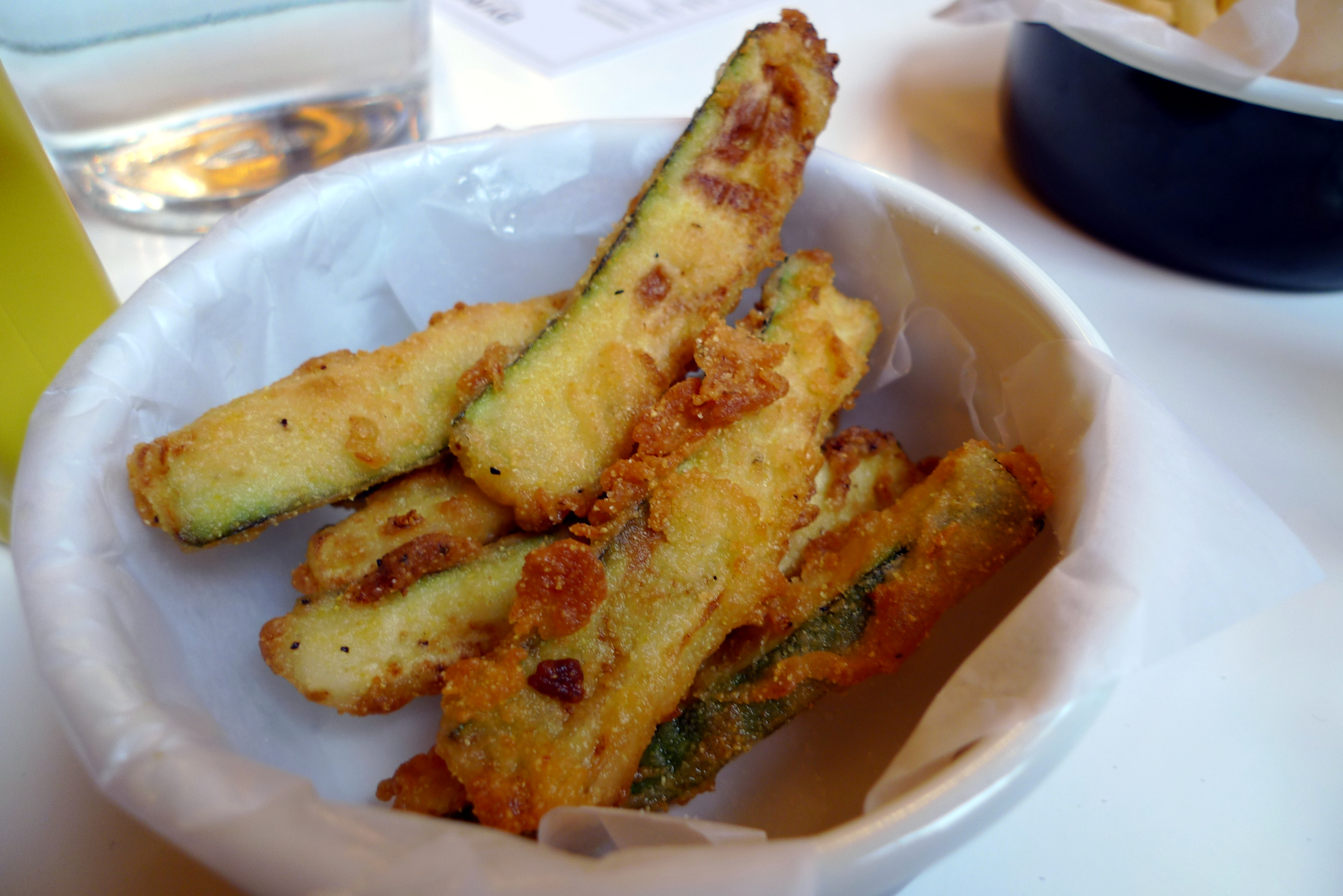
Zucchini chips

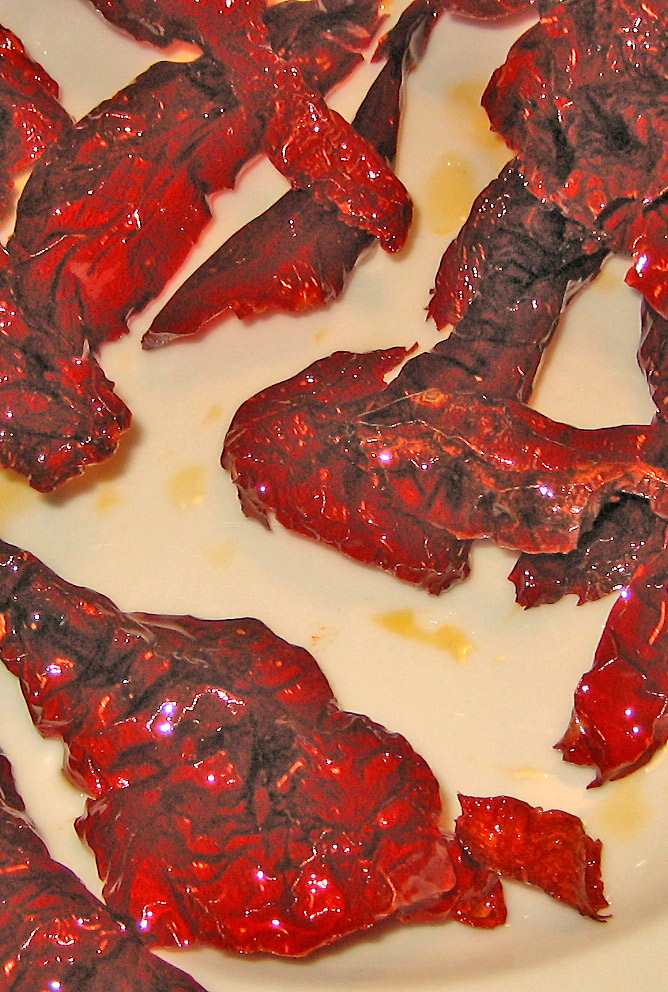
Peperoni cruschi chips from Basilicata, Italy

=== Carrot chips ===
Carrot chips are carrots that have been fried or dehydrated. Some U.S. companies mass-produce and purvey carrot chips to consumers, such as Connecticut Country Fair Snacks, Ltd. and Caroff Foods Corporation, among others. (Note: "The old-fashioned potato chip has a couple of new competitors for the nutrition-oriented palate: crisp snacks made from fried carrots. For three years, Connecticut Country Fair Snacks, Ltd., a Southington, Ct., firm, has marketed fried vegetable ...")

=== Cassava chips ===
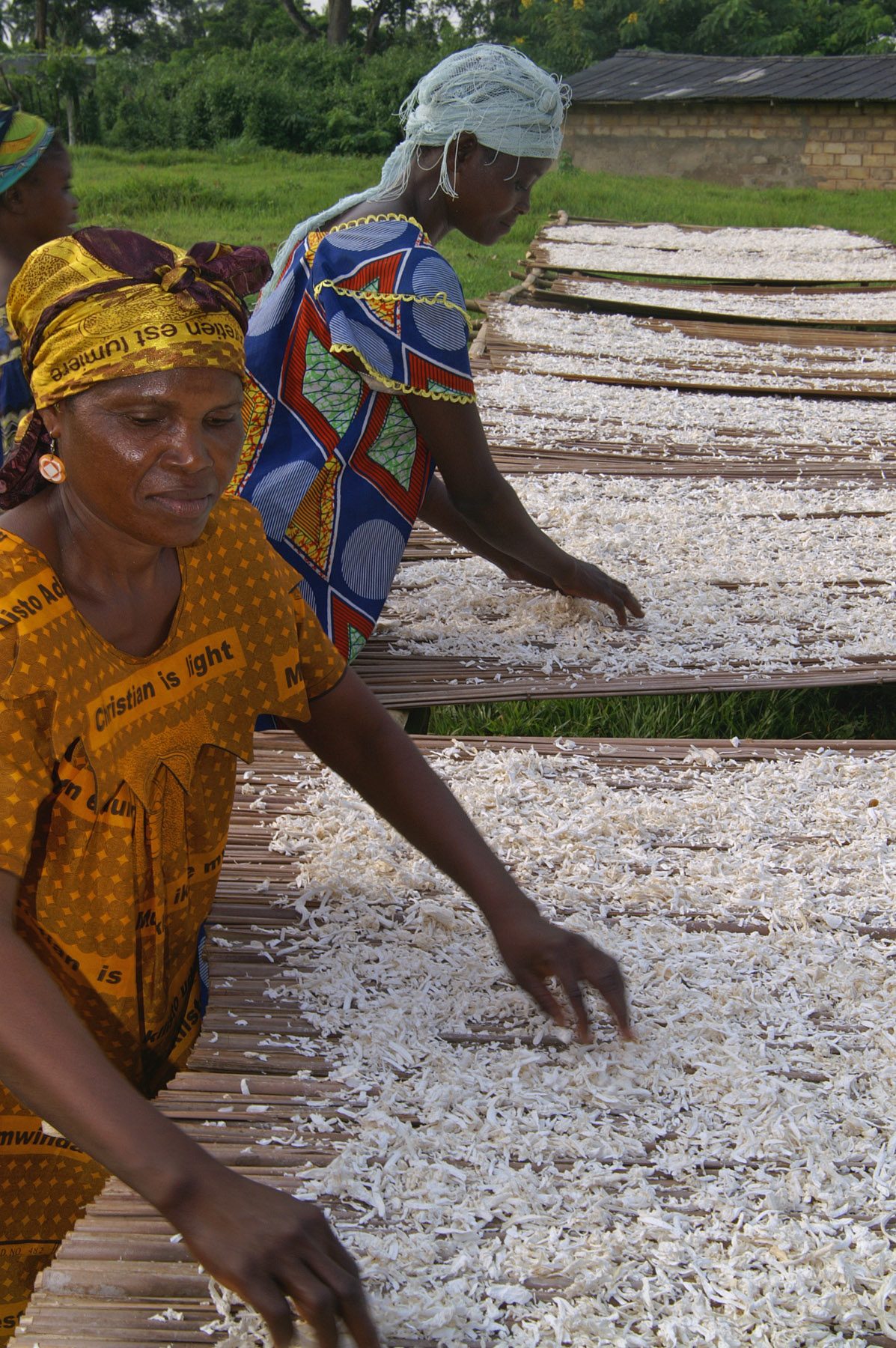
Cassava chips being dried in the Democratic Republic of the Congo

Cassava chips are a common food in much of Africa, including the Democratic Republic of the Congo, Ghana and Malawi. In Ghana, cassava chips are called konkonte. (Note: However a large proportion of the total crop is processed at the village level into typical cassava products such as gari, cassava dough, cassava chips (konkonte) or as fufu. The cassava is usually processed because of the extreme ...") Dried cassava chips are also used to supplement the carbohydrate content of livestock feed in Ghana. In Malawi, cassava chips are prepared by soaking cassava, slicing it, and then letting it dry. This is the primary means by which cassava is transported to markets from production areas.

In addition to preparing cassava chips from thinly sliced raw cassava root that is then immediately fried or deep-fried, chips may be prepared in a multi-stage process, starting with a dough made from cassava flour. The dough is steamed, thinly sliced, dried, and then fried in oil. This style of cassava flour chips is a popular food in India, Indonesia, Malaysia, and the Philippines.

=== Kale chips ===
Kale chips became popular with the food trend that emphasized kale for its nutritional value. A leaf rather than a root or a tuber, kale chips usually contain oil and salt, and sometimes seasonings or flavorings.

=== Bittergourd chips ===
Bittergourd chips are made from a plant common in Asia, Africa, and the Caribbean. The chips are made from the fruit of the plant, which are sliced and sun-dried, or coated with batter and fried.

== Consumption and uses ==
Vegetable chips may be consumed as a snack food, and may be accompanied by various dips such as salsa, guacamole, and bean dips. They are also used as a topping for soups, salads, and other dishes.

== Mass production ==
In the United States, varieties of vegetable chips are mass-produced and purveyed in supermarkets.

=== Brands and companies ===
Brands of vegetable chips (other than potato chips) include Calbee, Beanitos, Terra, Food Should Taste Good, Garden Veggie Snacks, JicaChips, Sensible Portions, Tyrrells, and Uprooted, among others. As of February 2016, Kettle Foods produces the Uprooted brand of vegetable chips made from sweet potatoes, including varieties with and without the addition of beets and parsnips. The product is "lightly seasoned with oil and sea salt". Marketing of the product to consumers began circa February 2016.

== See also ==
- Bean chips
- Chips and dip
- Fried plantain
- List of deep fried foods
- List of snack foods
- List of vegetable dishes
- Tapioca chips
