= Bean chips =

Snack food

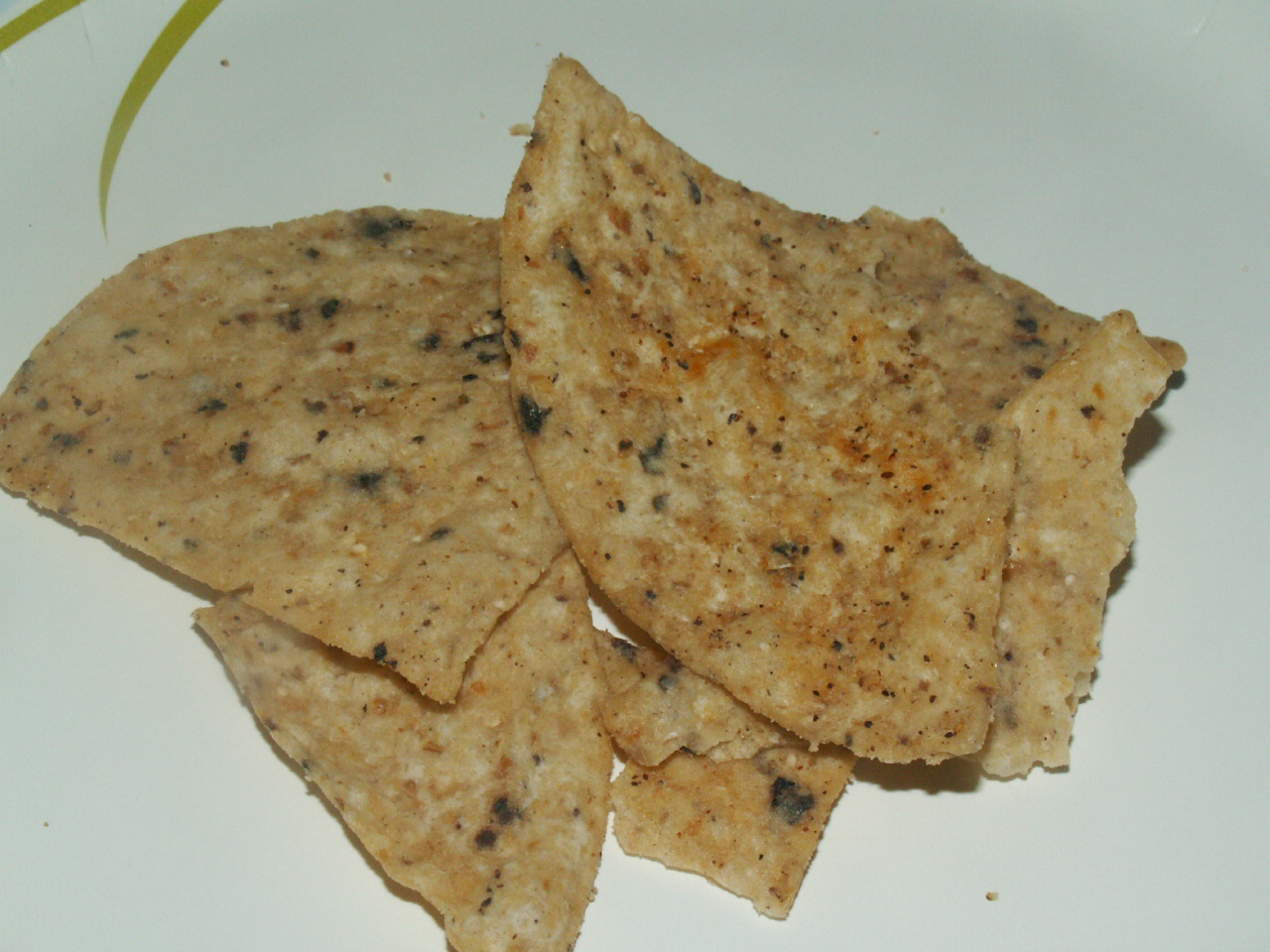
Tostitos-brand garlic and black bean chips

Bean chips are chips prepared using beans as a primary ingredient. Bean chips have been described as being higher in fiber and protein compared to corn and potato chips. Bean chips may be prepared from a variety of bean types and rice, such as brown rice, pinto beans, black beans, and white beans. Some bean chips are prepared using green beans. They may be prepared from a bean dough that is steamed, sliced, and fried. They may be consumed as a snack food and may be accompanied by various dips.

== Preparation methods ==
Bean chips may be deep-fried or baked, and may be seasoned. A method of preparation uses dehulled, soaked beans that are blended with vegetable oil, salt, and a thickening agent. Using this method, the mixture is formed into a dough which is then steamed, after which the dough is sliced and the pieces are fried.

== Green bean chips ==
Green bean chips may be prepared mixed with olive oil and seasonings, which are placed on a baking pan and baked until they are crisp. They may be prepared by freeze-drying green beans that are then vacuum-fried. Per a one-ounce (30 g) serving, green bean chips contain 130 calories, 4.5 g fat and 5 g fiber.

== Commercial varieties ==
Some companies in the United States mass-produce bean chips for consumer purchase, in a variety of flavours, with brands including Beanfields Bean Chips, The Good Bean, Inc., and Beanitos. Bean chips produced by The Good Bean, Inc. are prepared with beans, sweet potato, and quinoa.

== See also ==
- Bean dip
- Chips and dip
- Corn chips
- List of deep fried foods
- List of legume dishes
- List of snack foods
- Tortilla chips
- Vegetable chips
