= Axium Foods =

American food company

Axium Foods, LLC
- Type: Private
- Industry: Snack food
- Headquarters: South Beloit, Illinois
- Website: www.axiumfoods.com

Axium Foods, LLC is a manufacturer of corn-based snack products, including plain and flavored tortilla chips, corn chips, puffed cheese snacks, and crunchy cheese snacks.

Headquartered in South Beloit, Illinois, United States, it is a private label snack food manufacturer and the maker of Pajeda's snacks.

== History ==
Eugene "Mac" McCleary graduated with a degree in chemical engineering from Michigan State University class of 1942. He enlisted in the Navy during World War II and was stationed in Beloit, WI, where he was head of government inspection for submarine engines being built at Fairbanks Morse.

After the war, McCleary was offered a job at Adams Corporation, a fledgling company formed to manufacture and distribute the Korn Kurl, a new snack food that was invented on a local dairy farm. He worked with Adams Corporation for 15 years as their Director of Manufacturing, and was instrumental in the development of continuous production of this new snack food.

McCleary started his own private label snack food company on November 22, 1960, and called it McCleary Industries, which would later be renamed to McCleary, Inc. and then Axium Foods, Inc.

In 2000, Axium Foods created Pajeda's, its first branded line of tortilla chips and snacks. In 2010, Pajeda's introduced Fiesta Crunch, a line of tortilla chips and potato poppers.

McCleary died in 2007.

In November 2010, Axium Foods celebrated 50 years in business.

In March 2012, Axium Foods introduced the brand Mystic Harvest, including tortilla chips made with purple corn.

Axium Foods was acquired by CK Snacks in September 2024.

== Environmental sustainability ==
Axium Foods has a full wastewater treatment plant that includes an activated sludge sequential batch reactor. The company also takes any dry waste created from producing its corn-based snacks and sells it as cattle feed to a local farmer, keeping the dry waste out of landfills.

Raw materials for their snacks, primarily corn and flavorings, come from local farmers and ingredient companies.

== Products ==
- Pajeda's Tortilla Chips
- Pajeda's Puffed Cheese and Crunchy Cheese snacks
- Pajeda's Party Mix
- Pajeda's Corn Chips
- Pajeda's Onion Rings

== See also ==
- List of food companies
