= Corn chips =

Snack food made from cornmeal

Corn chip
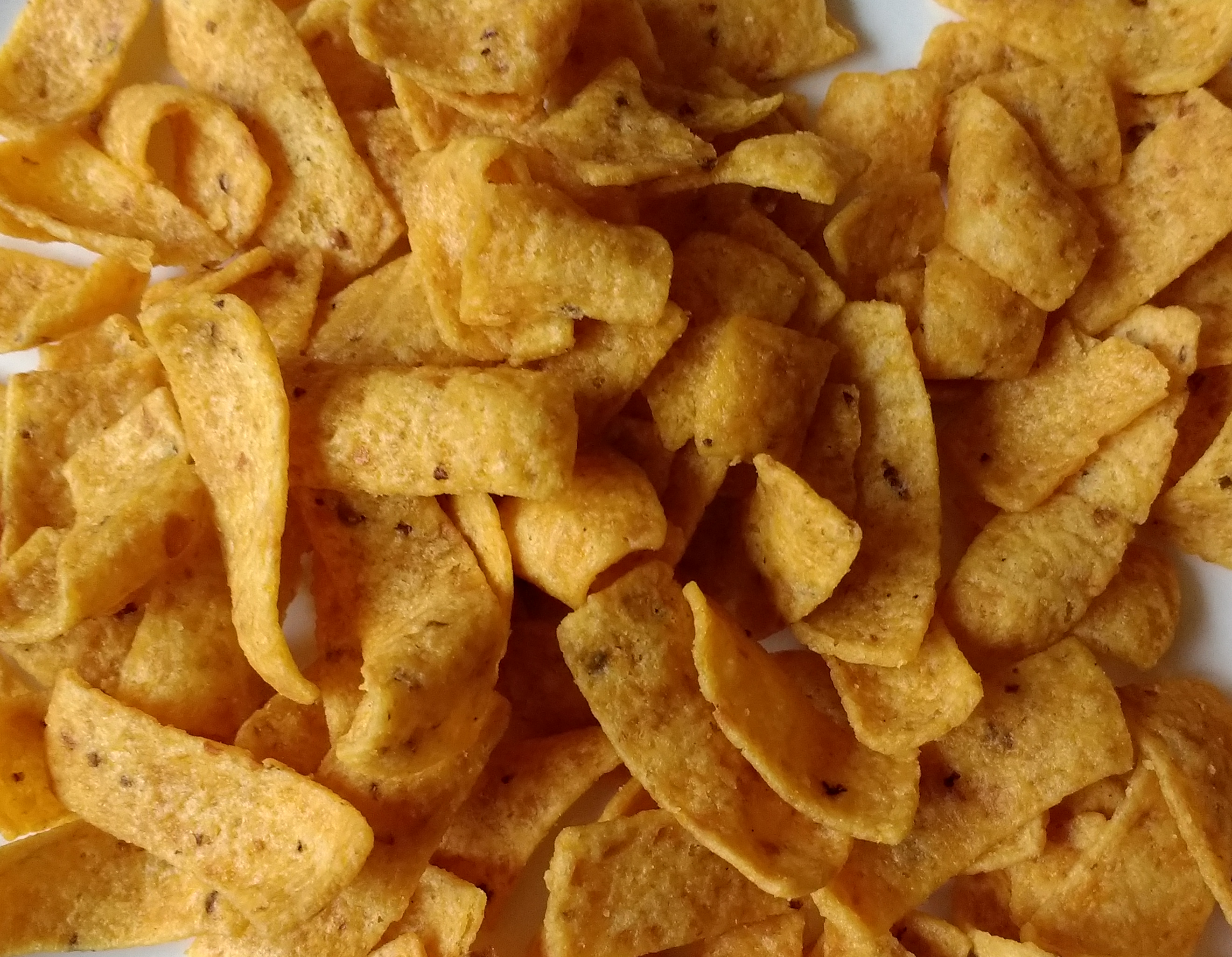
- Fritos
- Type: Snack food
- Place of origin: United States
- Serving temperature: Room temperature
- Main ingredients: Cornmeal
- Similar dishes: Potato chip (crisps)

Corn chips are a snack food made from cornmeal fried in oil or baked, usually in the shape of a small noodle or scoop. Corn chips are thick, rigid, very crunchy, have the strong aroma and flavor of roasted corn, and are often heavily seasoned with salt.

== Overview ==
In the United States, Fritos is one of the oldest and most widely recognized brands of corn chips.

While corn chips and tortilla chips are both made from corn, the corn in tortilla chips is subjected to the nixtamalization process, resulting in a milder flavor and aroma, and a less rigid texture. Tortilla chips also tend to be larger, thinner, less fatty, and less salty than corn chips.

Corn chips are usually eaten alone or with a chip dip. They are a common ingredient in homemade and commercial party mixes. In the Southwestern US, a popular dish, Frito pie, is made with corn chips and chili. In some areas, it is popular to pour the chili into a bag of corn chips and eat the mixture directly from the bag.

== See also ==
- Axium Foods
- Bean chips
- Chips and dip
- Corn Nuts
- Frito-Lay
- List of maize dishes
- Nachos
- Potato chip
- Seven Layer Dip
- Tortilla chip
