= Carrot chips =

Snack made of carrots

Carrot Chips
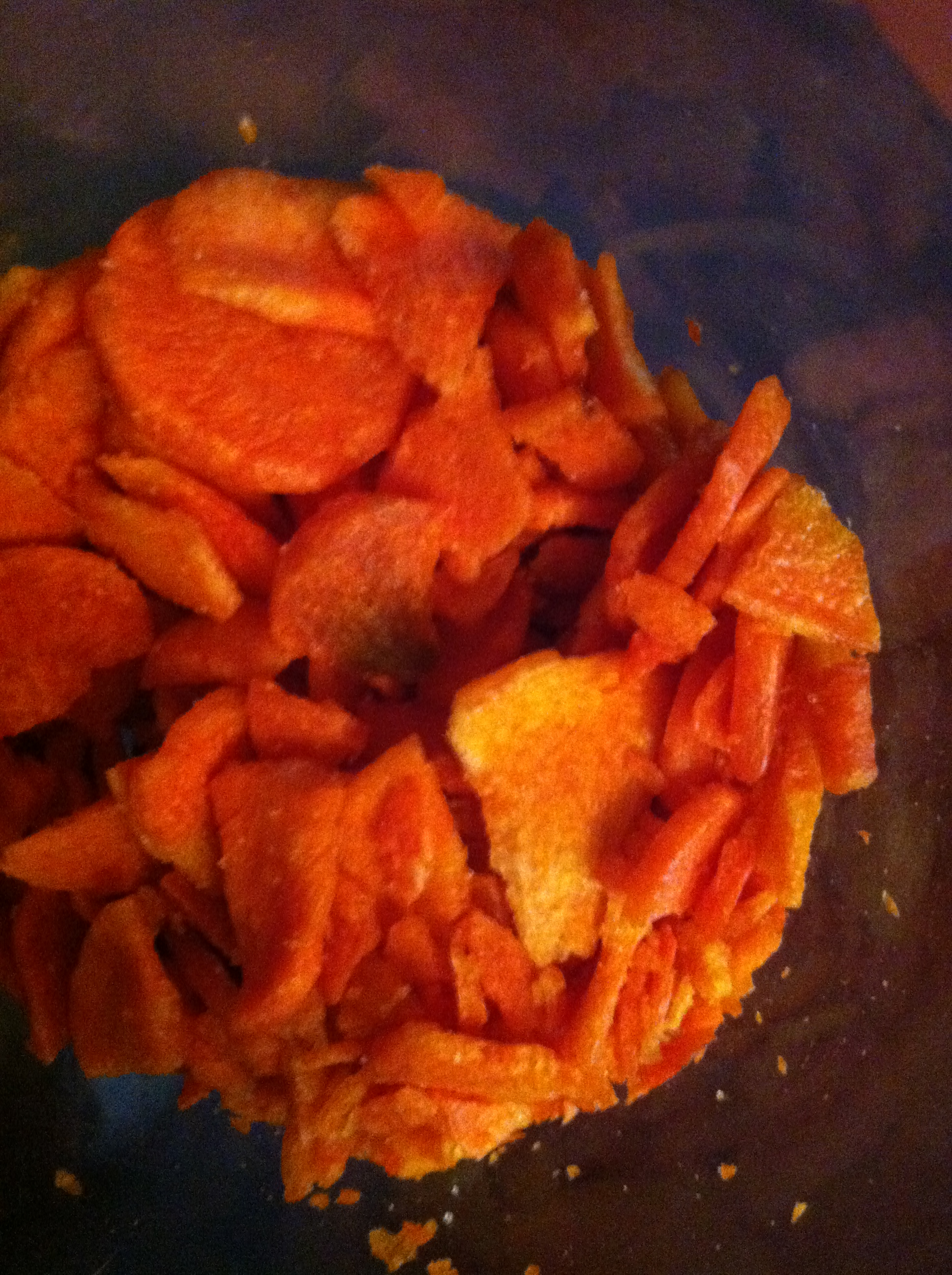
- Carrot Chips
- Type: Dehydrated Food, Fried Food
- Course: Snack

Carrot chips are carrots that have been fried or dehydrated. Bagged, sliced carrots may also be referred to as 'carrot chips'. The fried version of carrot chips is often referred to as carrot fries, especially when the chips are cut in the shape of french fries. Fried carrot chips have an oil content of 35–40%.

Carrot chips are considered a healthy alternative for potato chips, as the two items have similar consistencies and uses.

Carrot chips may, in fact, become a very important food in some developing countries. University of Nebraska Scientists Ahmad Suleiman and Judy Driskell have been working with carrot chip recipes because they believe that the chips might help to combat vitamin deficiencies in children who are growing up in impoverished circumstances.

== See also ==
- List of carrot dishes
- Vegetable chips
