= Bean dip =

Type of dipping sauce

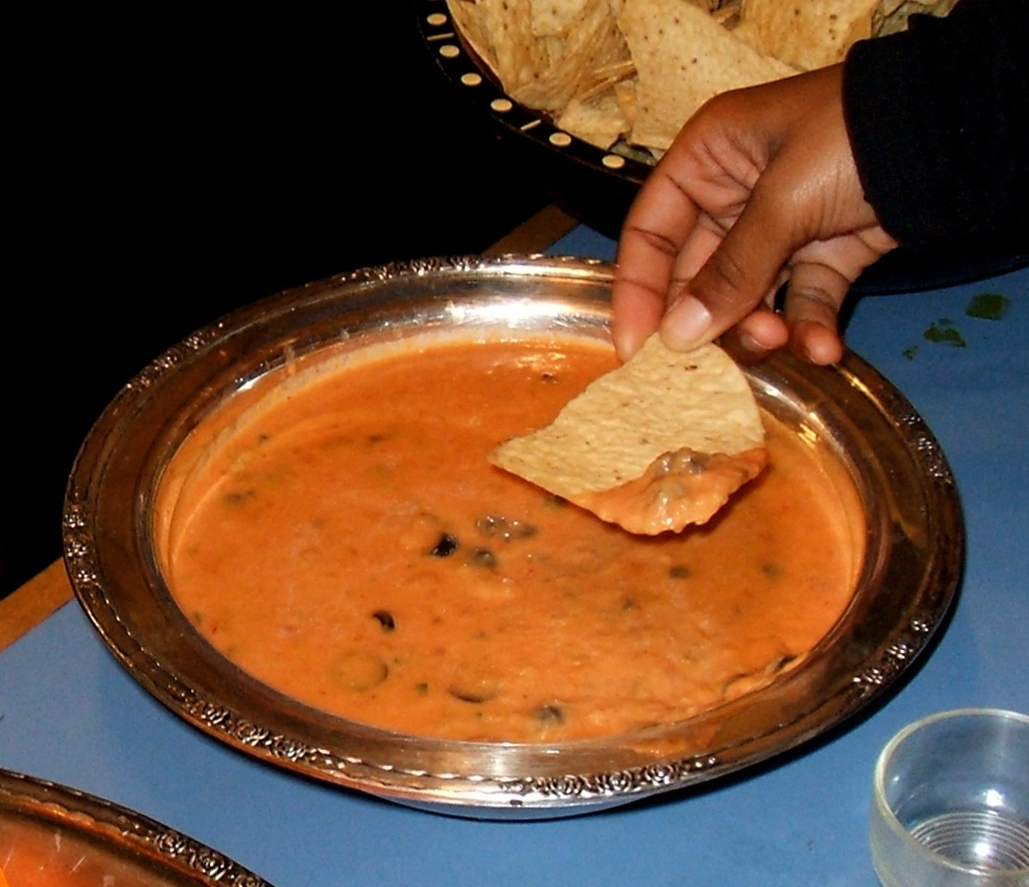
A bean dip served with tortilla chips

Bean dip is a type of dipping sauce made using beans or refried beans as a primary ingredient. It is typically served with tortilla chips, and can also be served with other foods such as crackers and crudités. Various types of beans are used, and fresh-cooked, canned or flaked beans can be used. Various additional ingredients are used in its preparation, such as onion, garlic, chili peppers and spices, and it is sometimes garnished with some ingredients. Bean dip can be served cold, at room temperature, or hot. Bean dip is sometimes used as an ingredient in the preparation of other dishes such as burritos and quesadillas.

== Overview ==
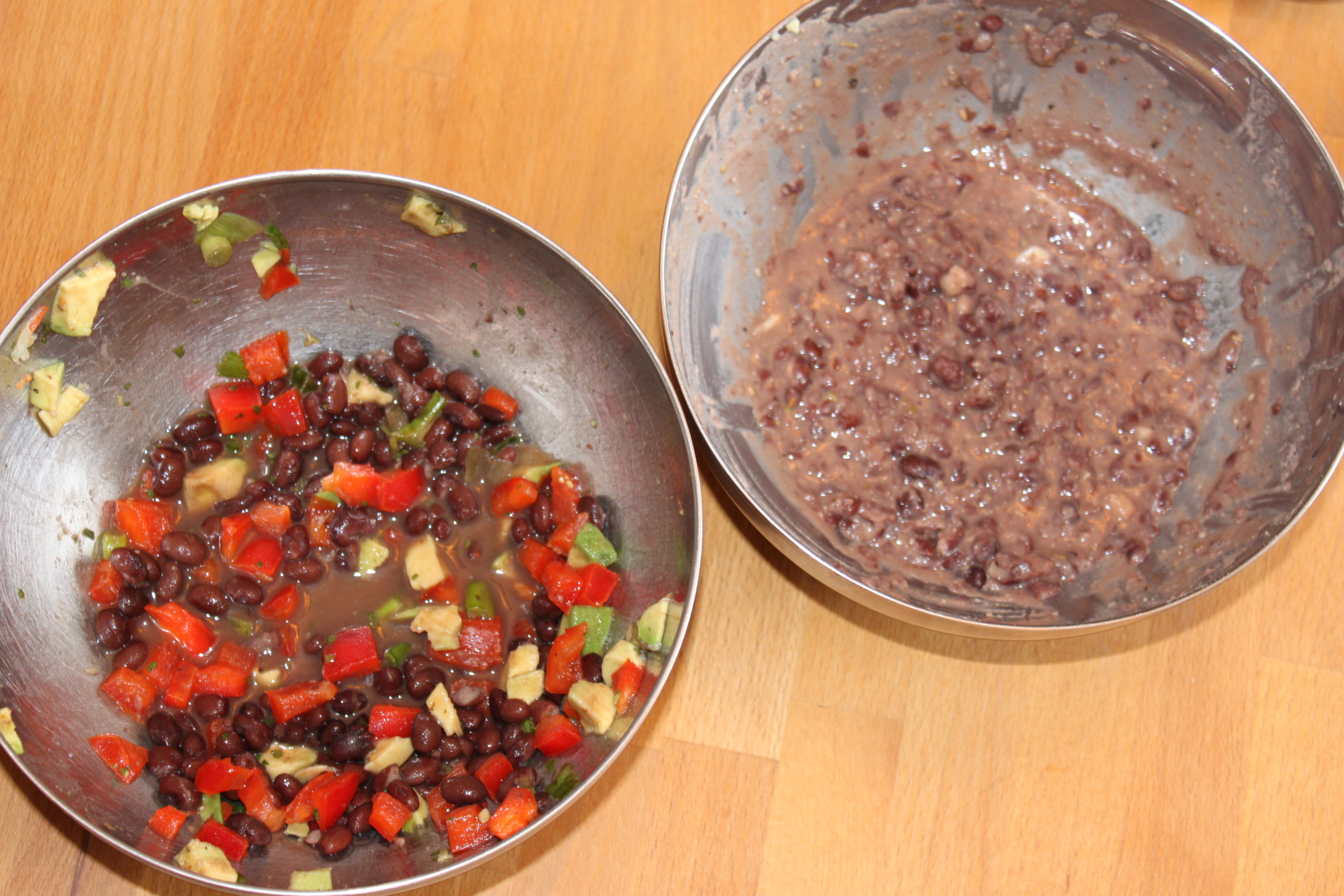
Black bean dips: one prepared with whole beans (left) and one prepared with mashed beans

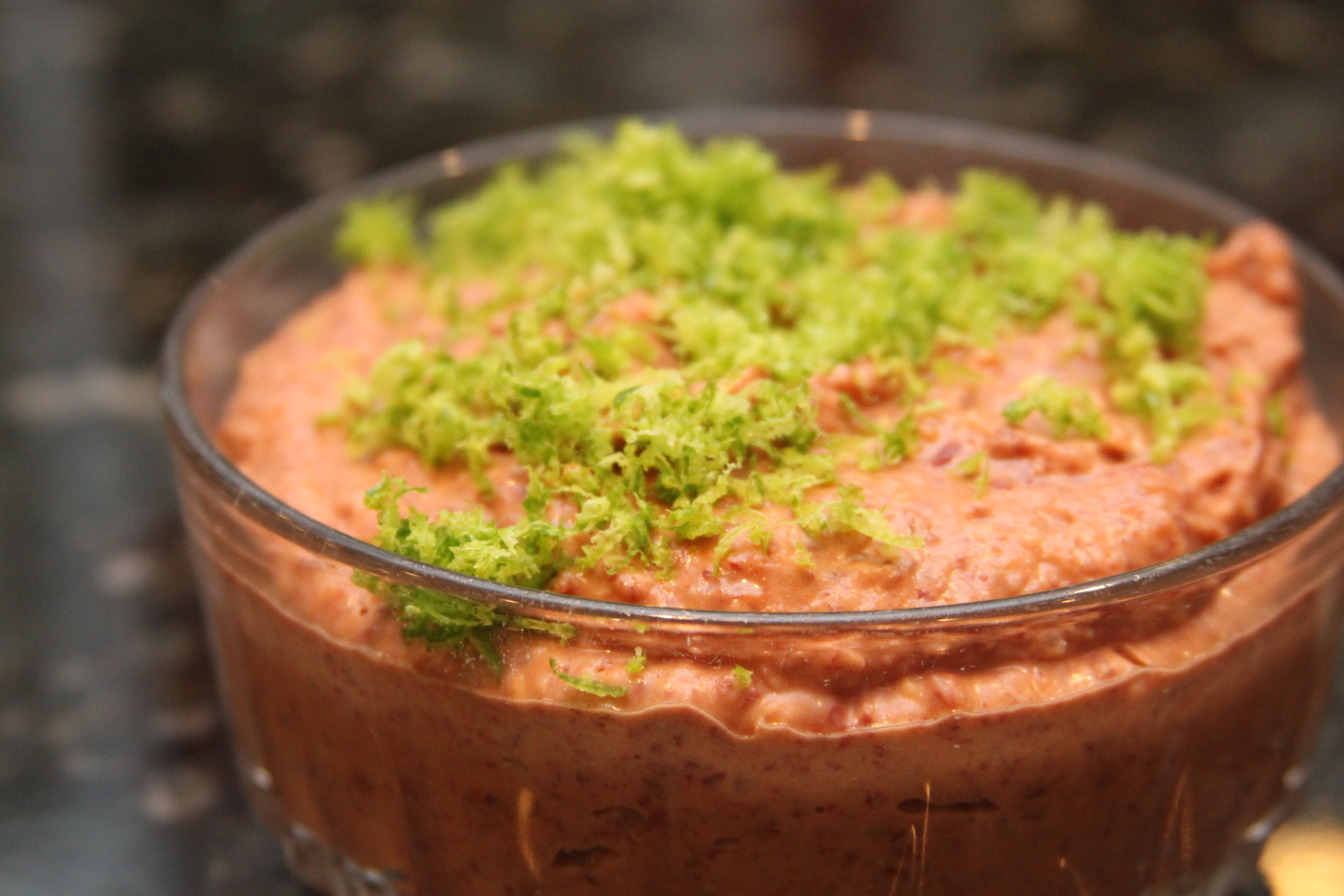
A bean dip prepared with kidney beans and garnished with lime zest

In the preparation of bean dip, various types of beans can be used, including black beans, pinto beans, kidney beans, white beans, fava beans, lima beans and edamame, a preparation of immature soybeans in the pod. Some bean dips incorporate several bean varieties into the dish, such as three-bean dip. Raw beans that are soaked and cooked are used, as are prepared canned beans and refried beans. The use of canned beans can result in a creamier dip, because beans prepared in canneries are pressure-cooked in the can. Canned beans may have a salty flavor, which can be reduced by rinsing and then draining them. Fresh cooked beans may contribute to a more flavorful dish compared to using canned beans. Prepared canned green chili peppers are also sometimes used as a main ingredient.

Prepared dried bean flakes can also be used in the dish's preparation. The bean flakes are reconstituted into a bean paste using boiling water, and can be used to create an instant or quick bean dip. The use of dried bean flakes can contribute to a bean dip with a creamy and smooth texture.

Many additional ingredients can be used, including onion, roasted red bell pepper, red and green chili peppers, cilantro, lime, lime juice and lime zest, lemon juice, sour cream, oil, lard, vinegar, water, and spices such as garlic, cumin, coriander, chili powder and cayenne, hot sauce, salt and pepper. The various ingredients can be mixed or puréed together using a food processor, a blender, or by hand. Bean dip is sometimes topped with shredded cheese and garnished with ingredients such as chopped cilantro, chopped green onion, chopped fresh or dried parsley and lime zest, among others.

Letting bean dip sit for a while before serving can increase the intermingling of flavors in the dish. Bean dip can be served cold, at room temperature, or as a hot dish. Hot bean dip can be prepared ahead of time, refrigerated and then cooked at a later time, and can also be prepared using a slow cooker and served in the appliance. Bean dip can be prepared as a vegan and gluten-free dish. The dish is typically served with tortilla chips, and can also be served with crackers, crudités, breadsticks, pita bread and toasted bread such as baguette.

== Commercial varieties ==
Some companies mass-produce bean dips, such as Frito-Lay, which produces Fritos Bean Dip. Some commercial bean dips are prepared with additional ingredients to add flavor, such as cheese or jalapeño. Some may have a high fat content, due to the presence of high-fat ingredients such as lard. Prepared refrigerated styles of bean dip are also mass-produced by some companies, which are stocked in the refrigerated section of grocery stores.

== Use in other dishes ==
Bean dip can be used as an ingredient in the preparation of seven-layer dip. Bean dip is also sometimes used as an ingredient in other dishes and foods, such as quesadillas, burritos and nachos, among others.

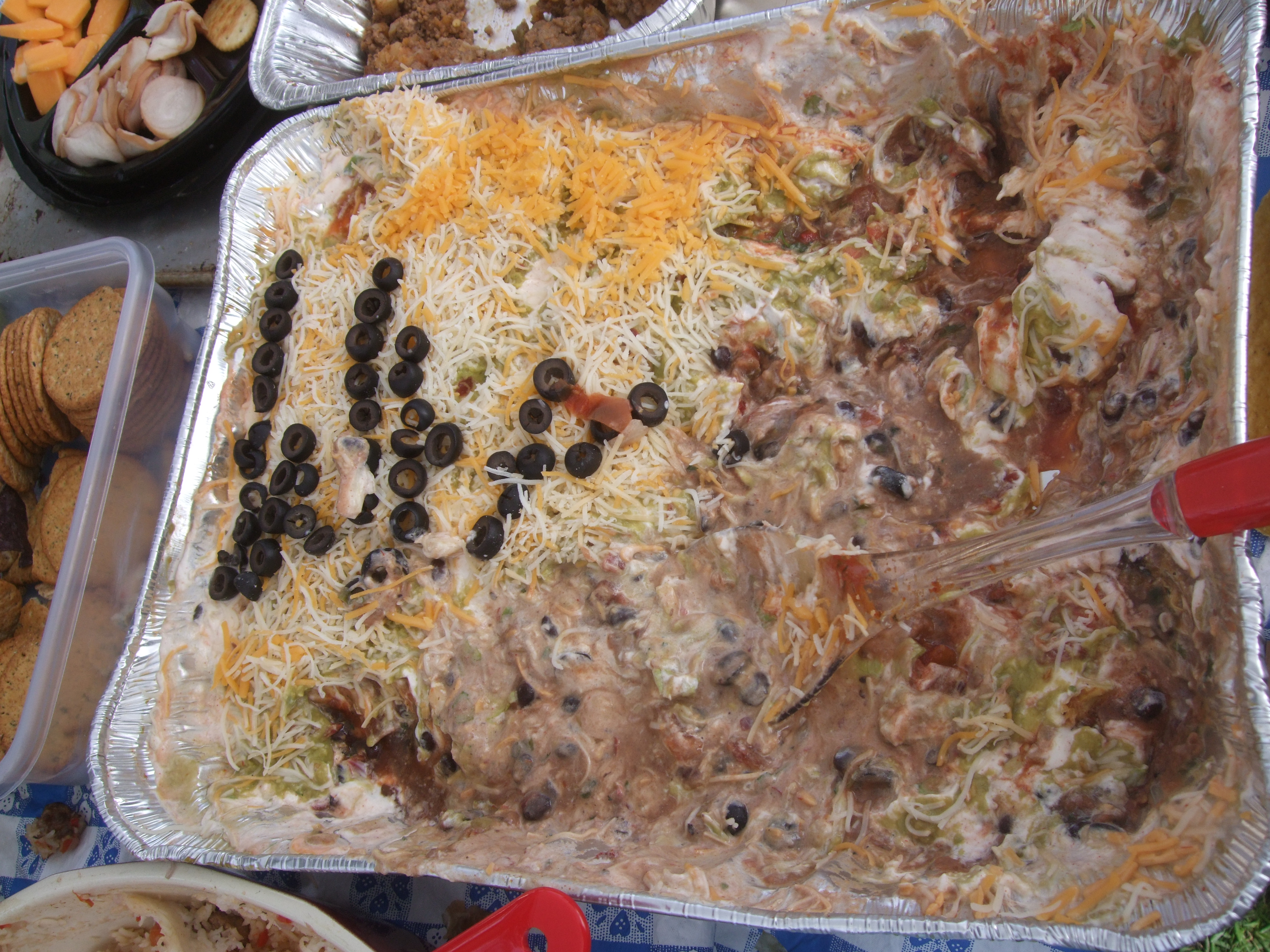
A seven-layer bean dip

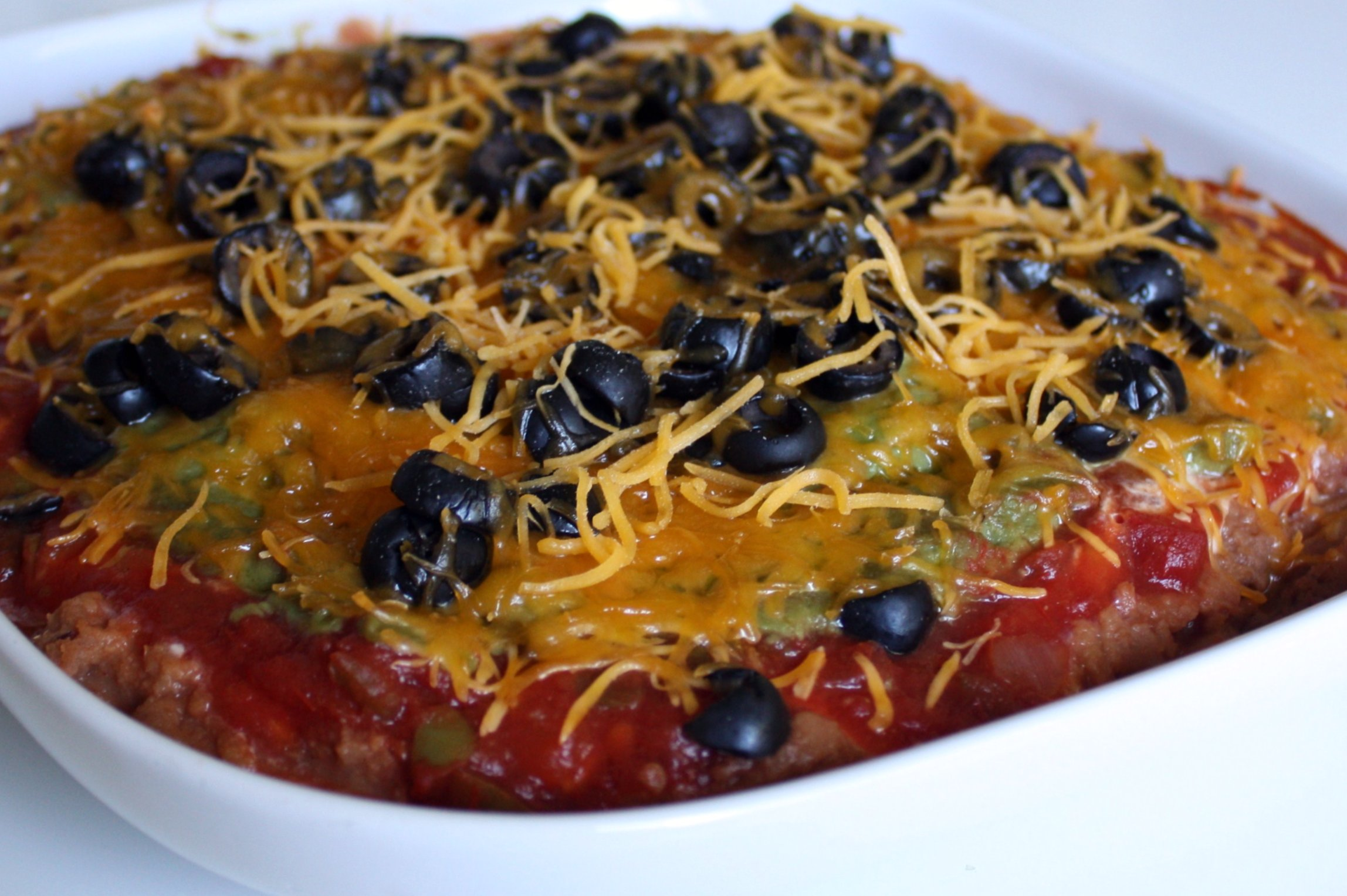
Close-up view of a seven-layer bean dip

== Gallery ==
Bean dips

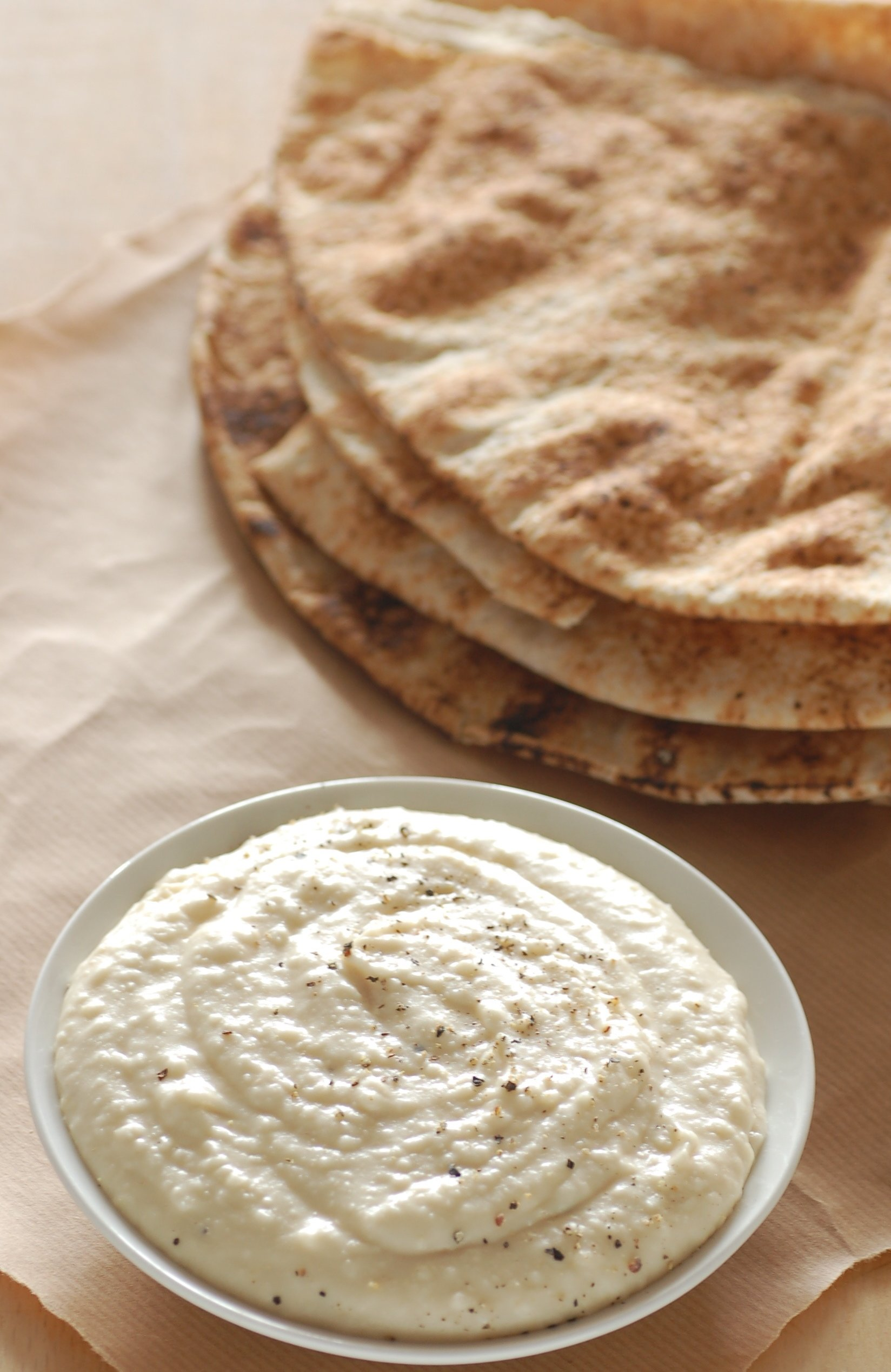
A white bean and Parmesan cheese bean dip served with pita bread

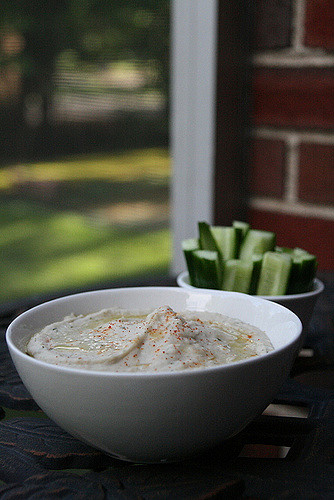
Herbed white bean dip with crudités

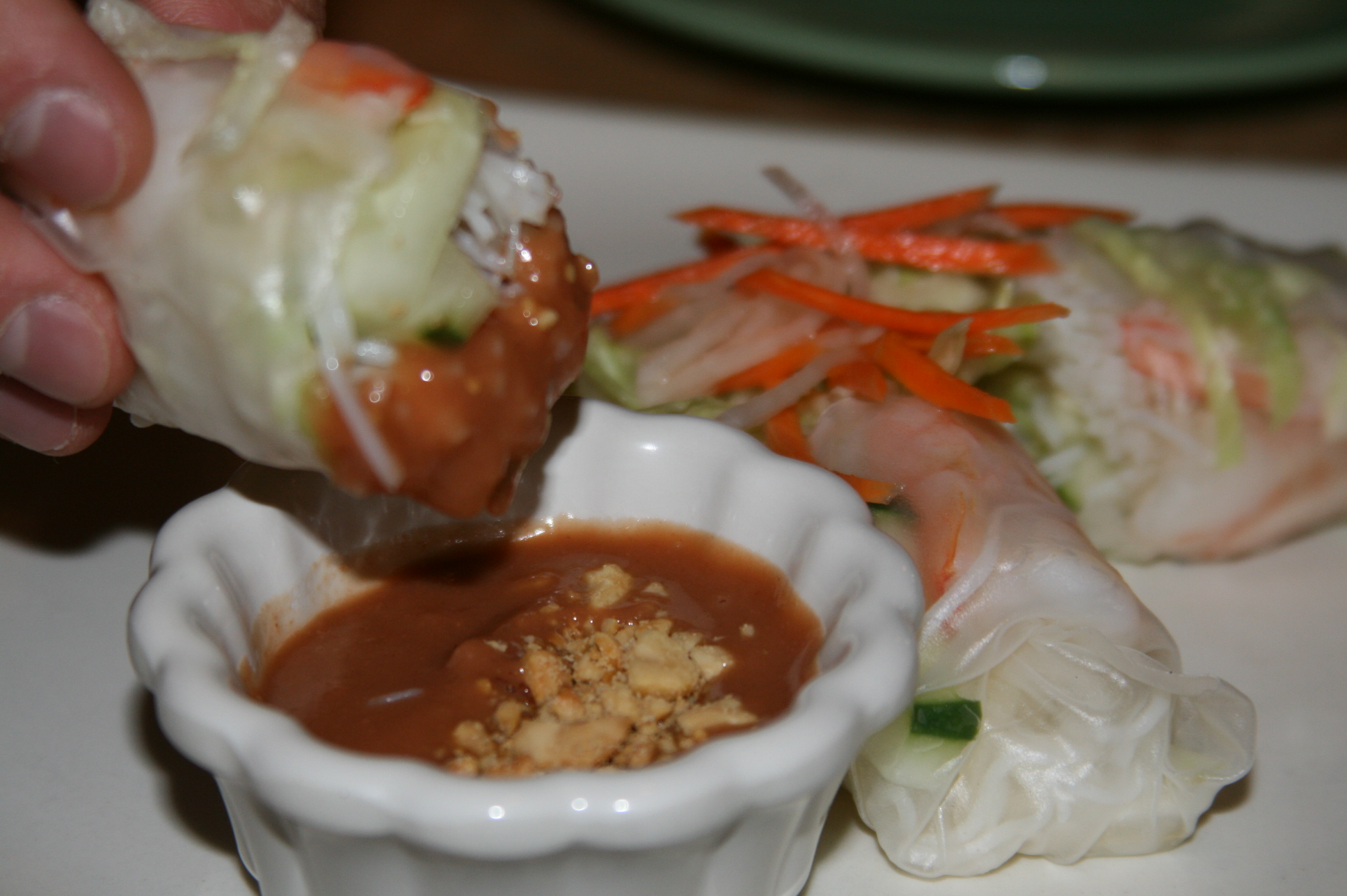
Spring rolls with a black bean dipping sauce

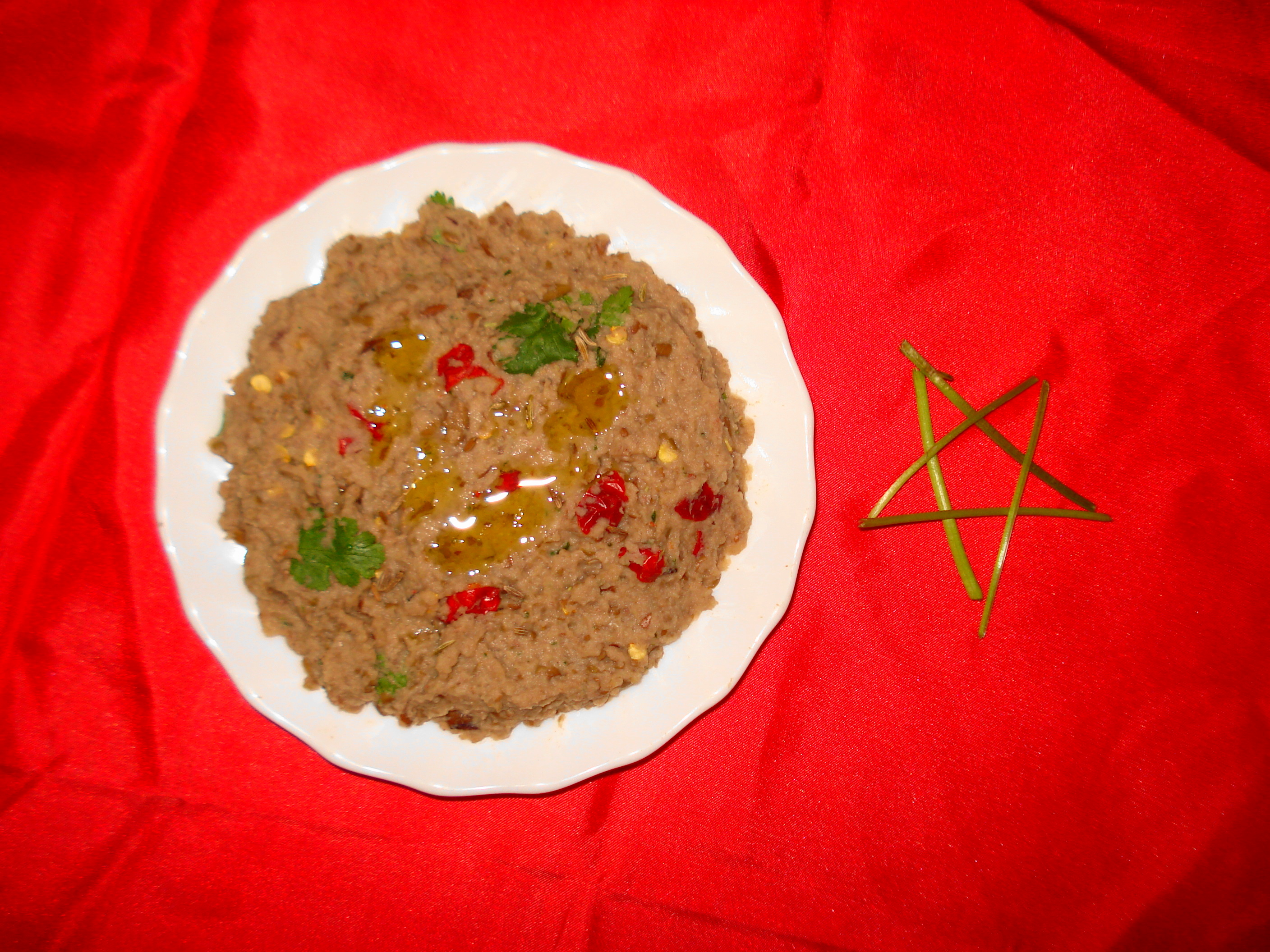
Bissara is a Moroccan broad bean dip or soup

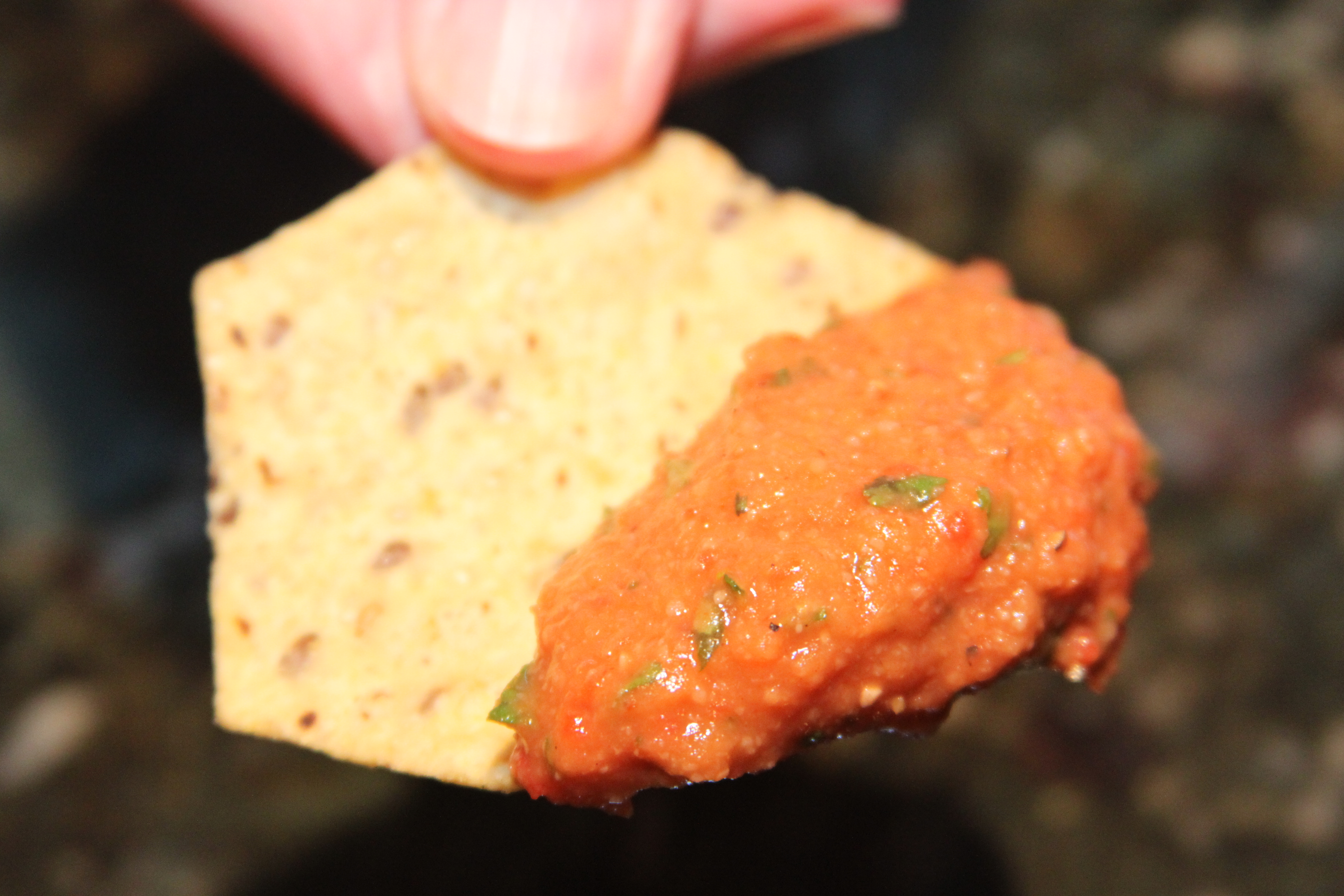
A bean dip prepared with white beans and roasted red pepper, on a tortilla chip

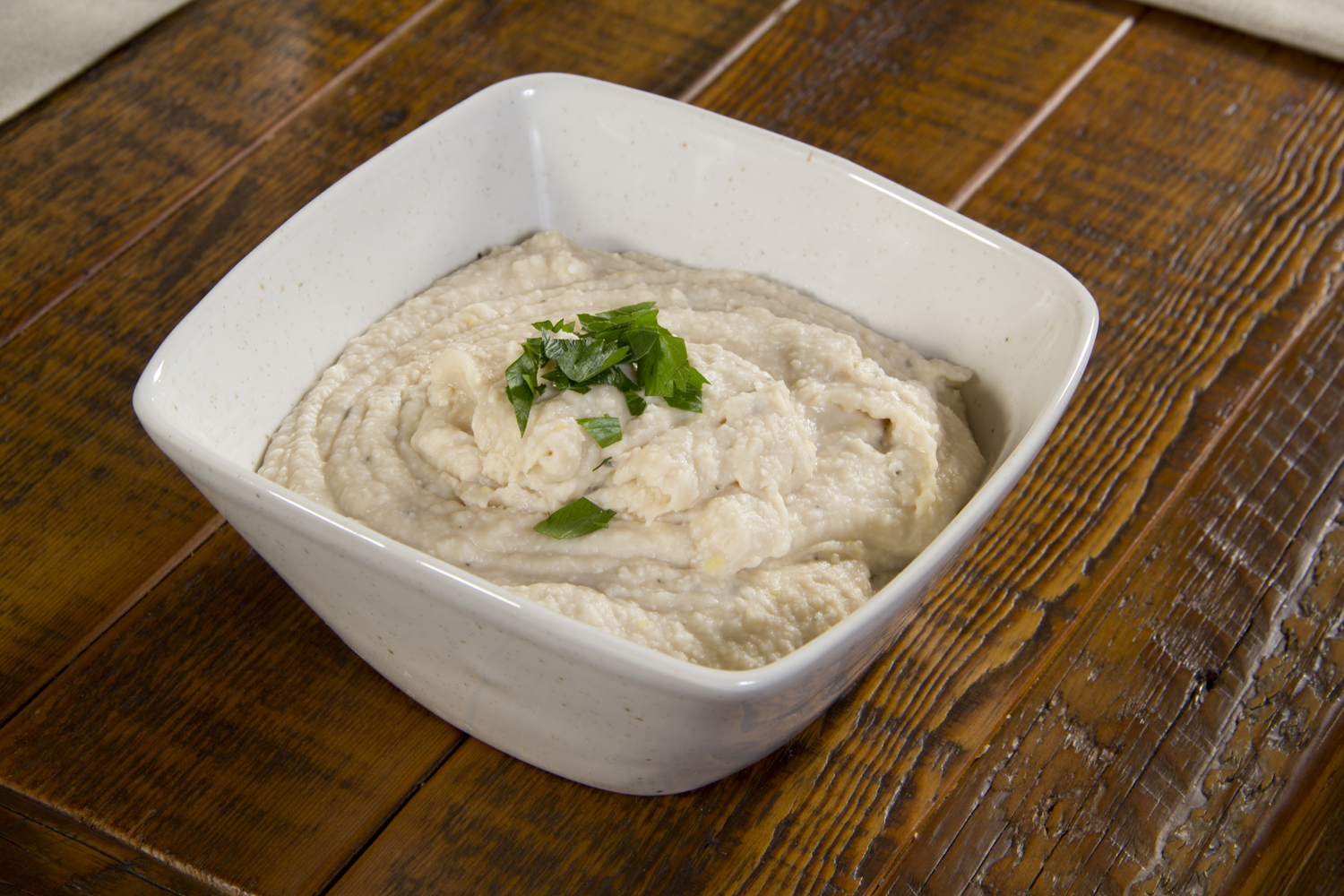
Bean dip prepared with white beans

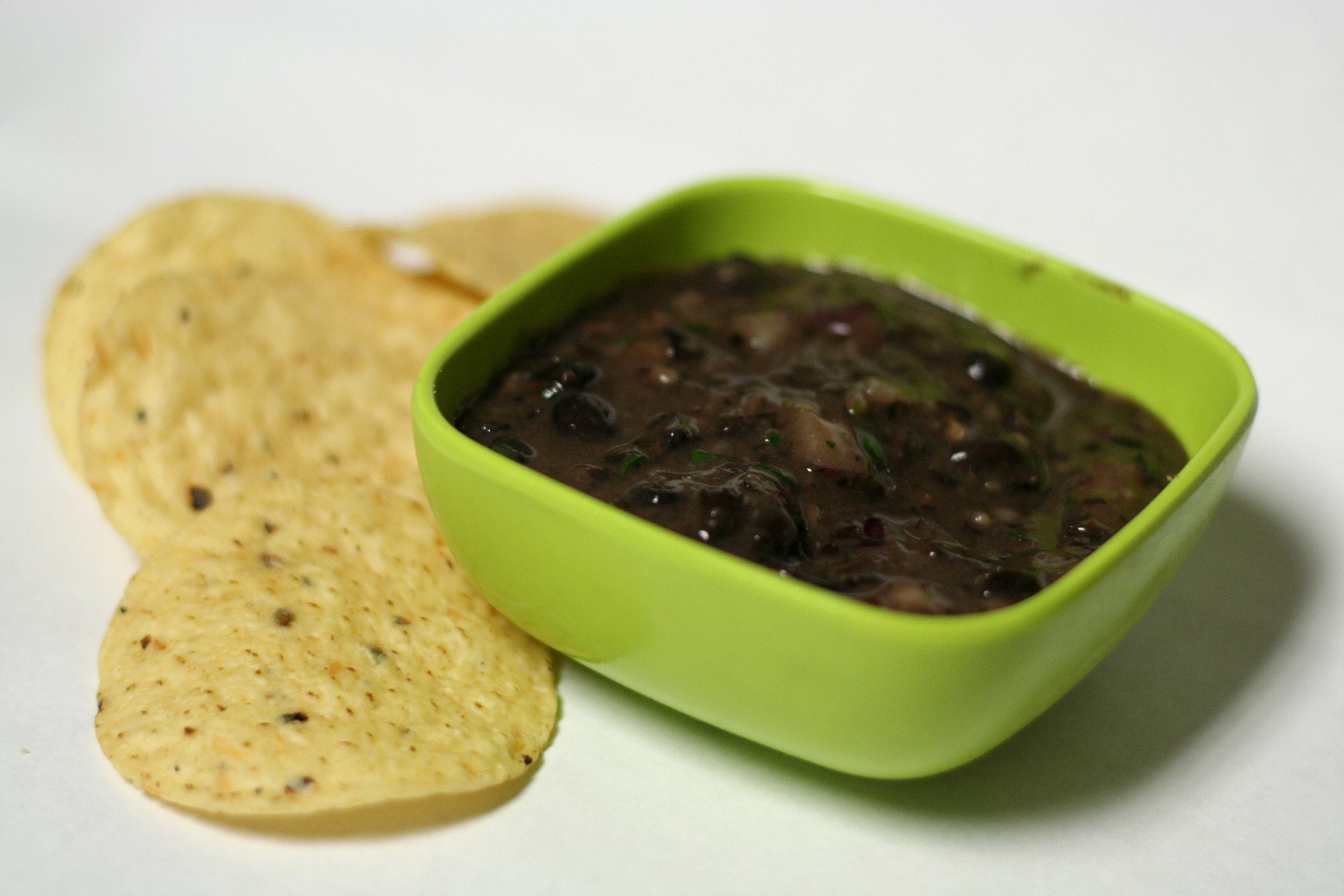
Black bean dip with tortilla chips

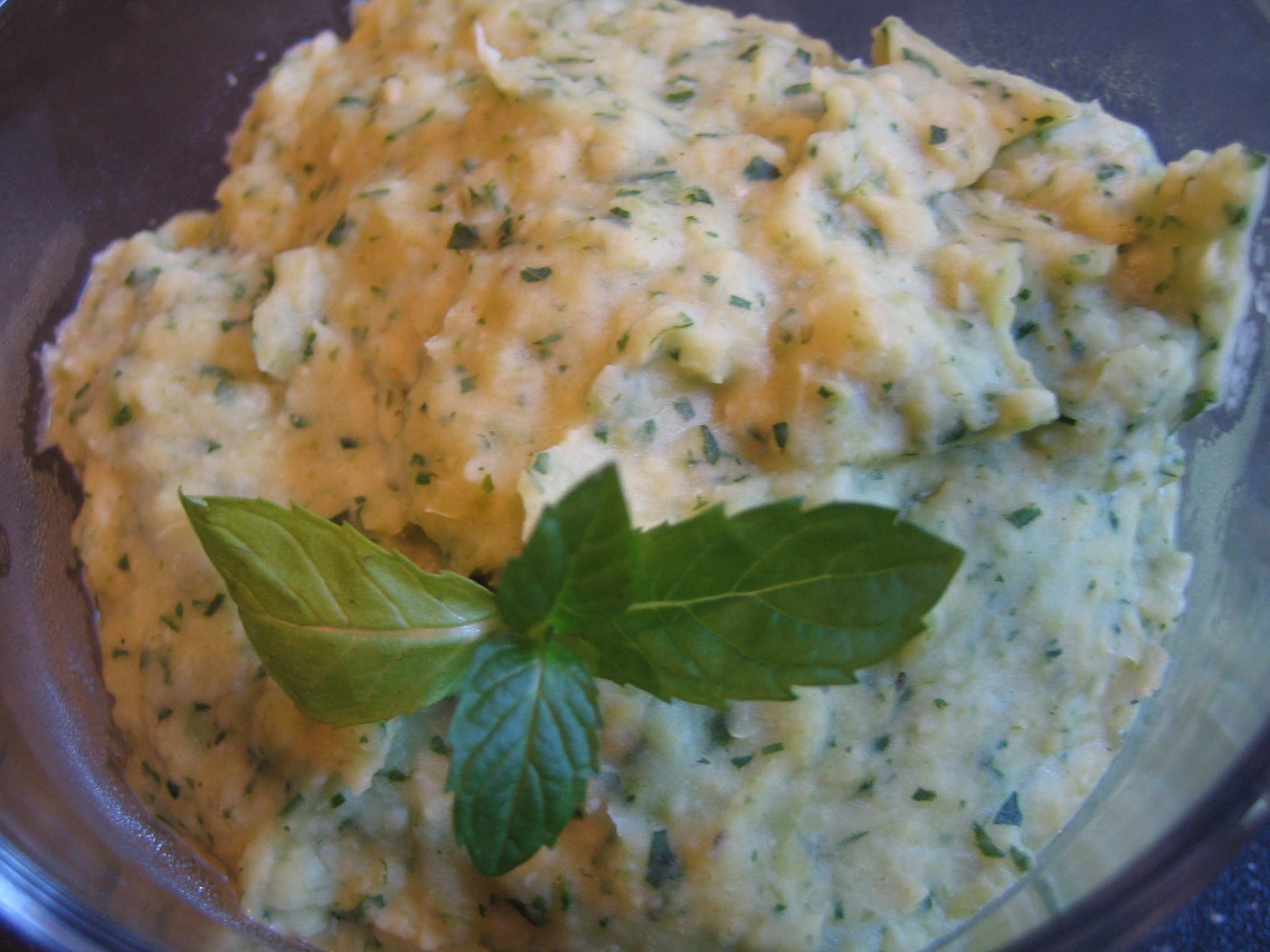
Close-up view of a lima bean dip

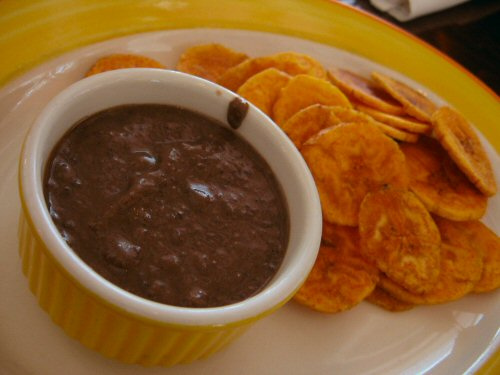
A bean dip served with plantain chips

== See also ==
- Chips and dip
- Chutney
- Fermented bean paste
- Hummus
- List of dips
- Sweet bean paste
