= Chips and dip =

Chips or crisps served with dips

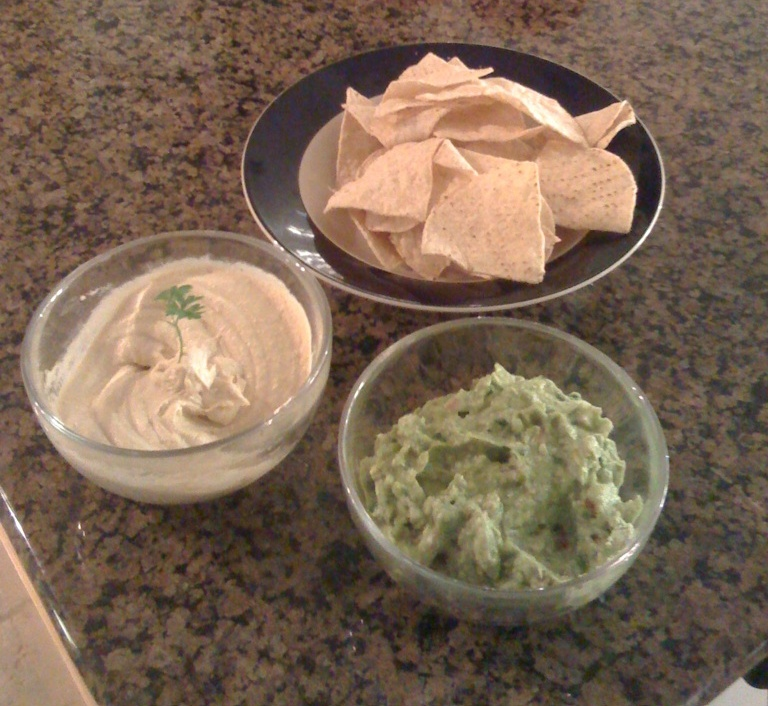
- Guacamole and hummus with tortilla chips
- Type: Snack food
- Course: Appetizer, side dish
- Serving temperature: Hot, cold, or room temperature

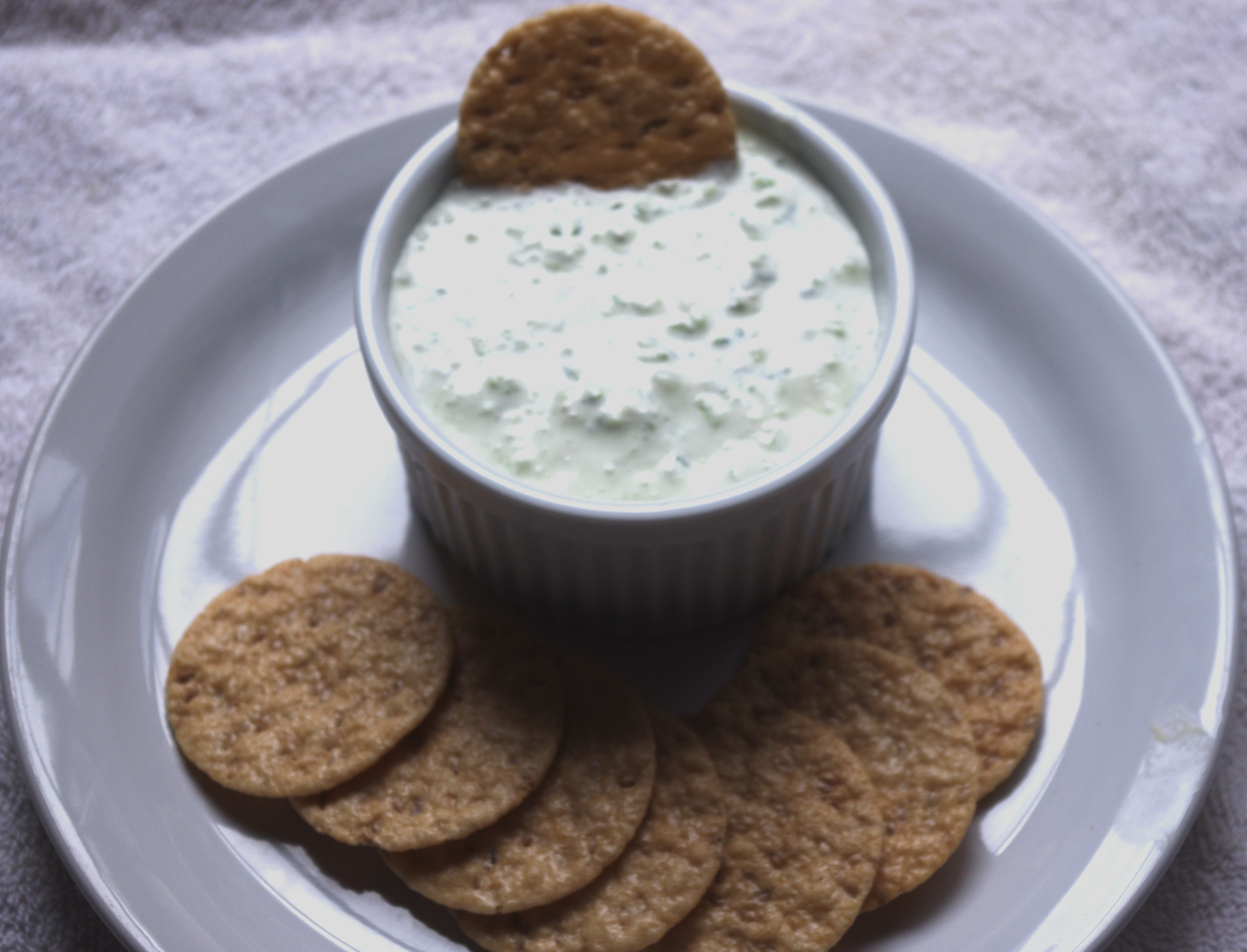
Benedictine and sesame crackers

Chips and dip are chips served with dipping sauces. Chips used include potato chips, tortilla chips, corn chips, bean chips, vegetable chips, pita chips, plantain chips and others. Crackers are sometimes substituted, as are crudités, which are whole or sliced raw vegetables. Various different dips may be used in accompaniment to the chip portion. The dish may be served as a party dish, appetizer, or snack.

Chips and dip gained significant popularity in the United States during the 1950s, in part due to a Lipton advertising campaign for their French onion dip recipe, sometimes referred to as "California dip". Specialized trays and serving dishes designed to hold both chips and dip were created during this time. Chips and dip are frequently served during the Super Bowl American football game in the United States. National Chip and Dip Day occurs annually in the U.S. on March 23.

== Rationale ==
Usually the chips served are not flavored, or flavored only mildly, and the dip serves as a condiment. Serving them separately allows for simultaneous consumption, while also allowing for the eater to control the amount of dip according to their preference. Additionally, pre-dipping the chips before serving them would cause them to become soggy. When made from purchased processed foods, the dish is an easy finger food, as each item requires almost no further preparation. Not to mention, there is a large amount of combinatorial possibility inherent to the choice of dip being paired to the chip chosen.

== History ==
The earliest known recipe for something similar to today's potato chips is in William Kitchiner's book The Cook's Oracle published in 1817, which was a bestseller in the United Kingdom and the United States. The 1822 edition's recipe for "Potatoes fried in Slices or Shavings" reads "peel large potatoes... cut them in shavings round and round, as you would peel a lemon; dry them well in a clean cloth, and fry them in lard or dripping".

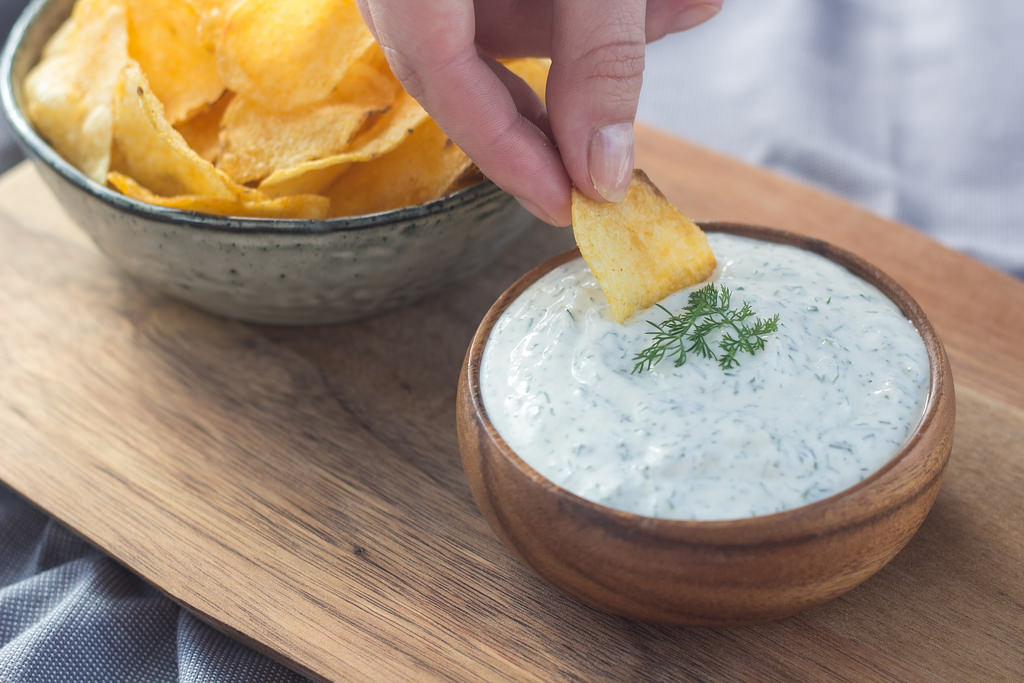
Potato chips with dip

The popularity of chips and dip significantly increased in the United States during the 1950s, beginning circa 1954, due to changes in styles of entertaining in the suburbs and also due to a Lipton advertising campaign based upon using Lipton's instant dehydrated onion soup mix to prepare dip. The advertising campaign occurred on television and in supermarket display advertising, and promoted mixing the soup mix with sour cream or cream cheese to create a dip, to be served with potato chips or crudités. This dip began to be called California Dip. The advertising campaign realized significant success, and new, similar dip products were quickly developed thereafter. During this time, unique platters designed for chips and dip service were created that allowed for the containment of several types of chips, and service variations were devised that included serving the dip in a bread bowl or hollowed-out fruit.

Chips and dip are a popular food during the annual Super Bowl game in the United States. Eighty-five percent of Americans eat potato chips.

== With corn-based chips ==
Chips and salsa, typically served using tortilla or corn chips, is a common type of chips and dip dish that gained significant popularity in the United States in the late 1980s. Chips and guacamole, also typically served with corn-based chips is another type, as well as chips and bean dip. Seven-layer dip and tortilla chips is another corn-based chip combination, as is chile con queso, an appetizer or side dish of melted cheese and chili pepper typically served in Tex-Mex restaurants as a sauce for nachos.

Dips with tortilla chips

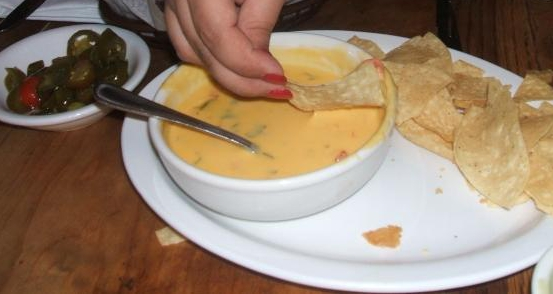
A bowl of chile con queso served with tortilla chips as an appetizer in a Tex-Mex restaurant

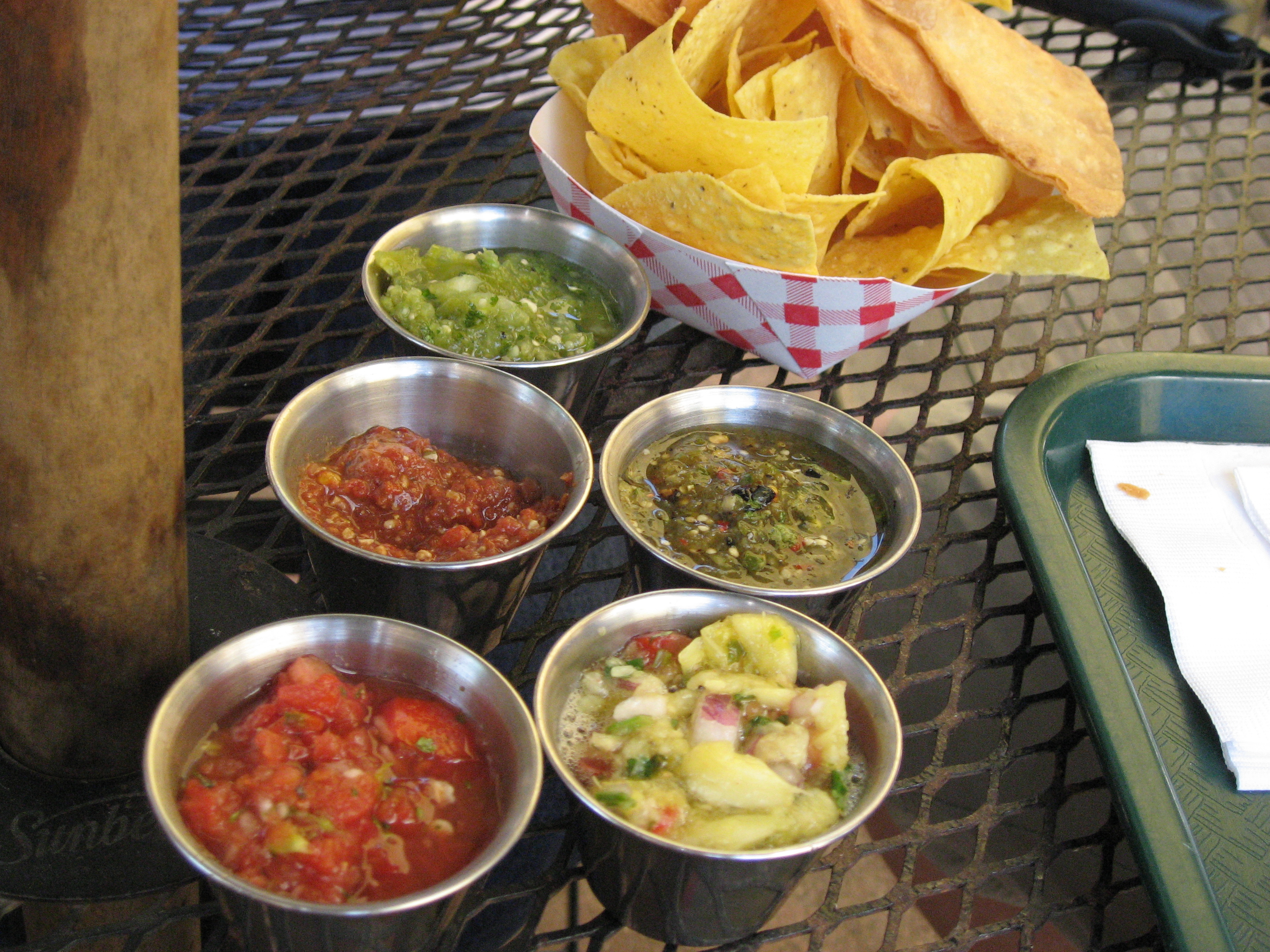
Tortilla chips and several salsas

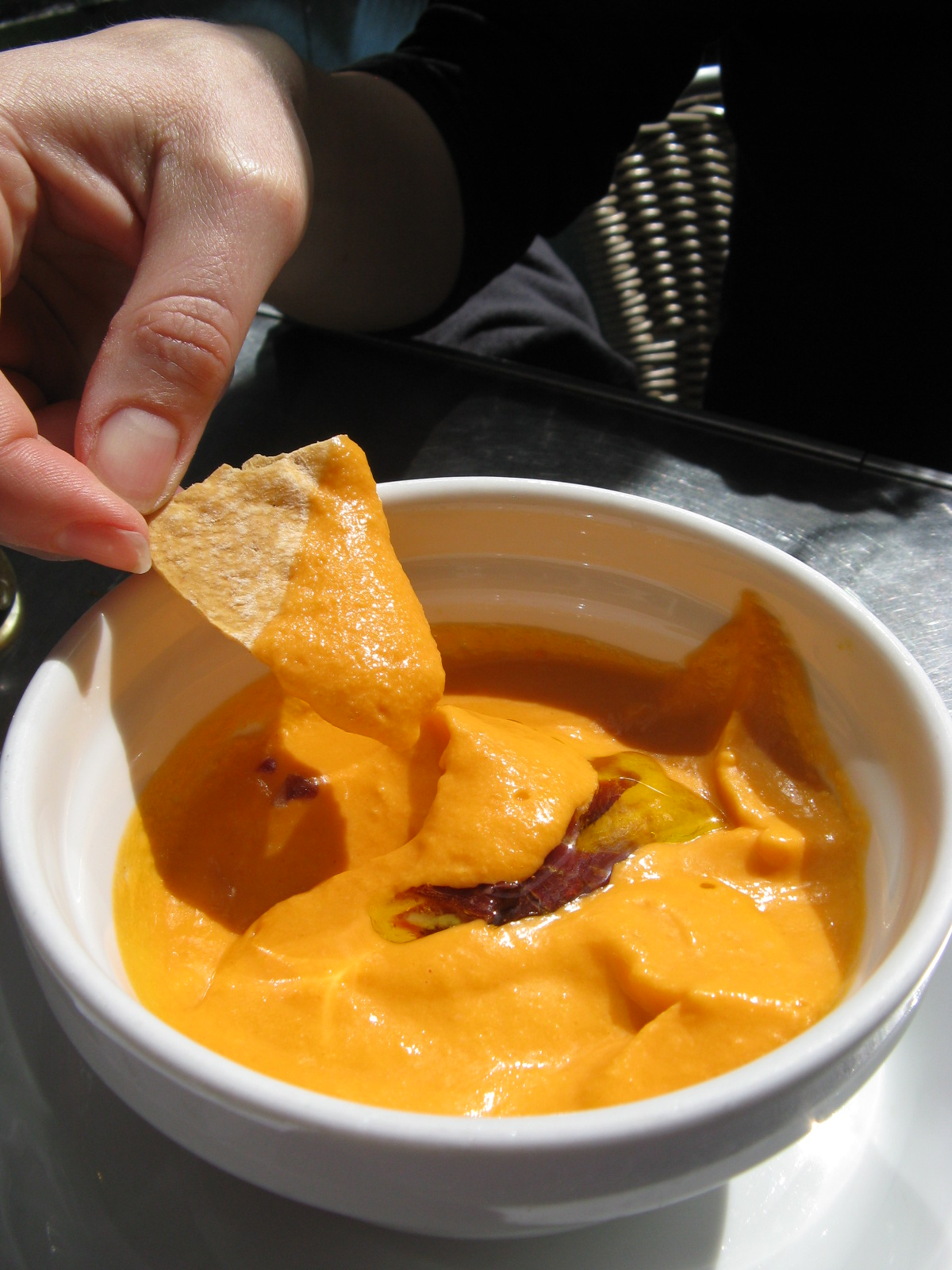
Salmorejo, a purée consisting primarily of tomato and bread, and a tortilla chip

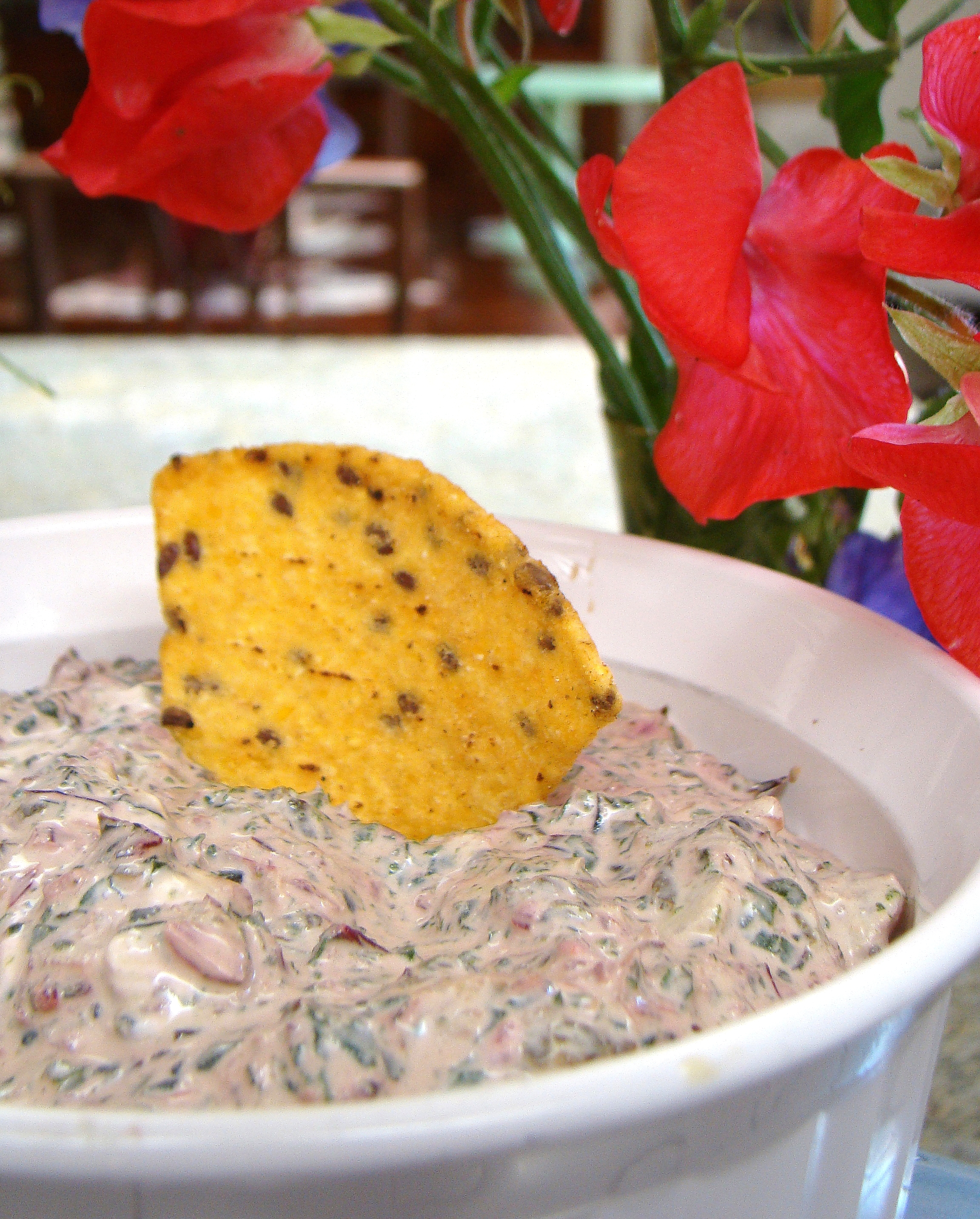
Chard dip with a flaxseed tortilla chip

== Double dipping ==
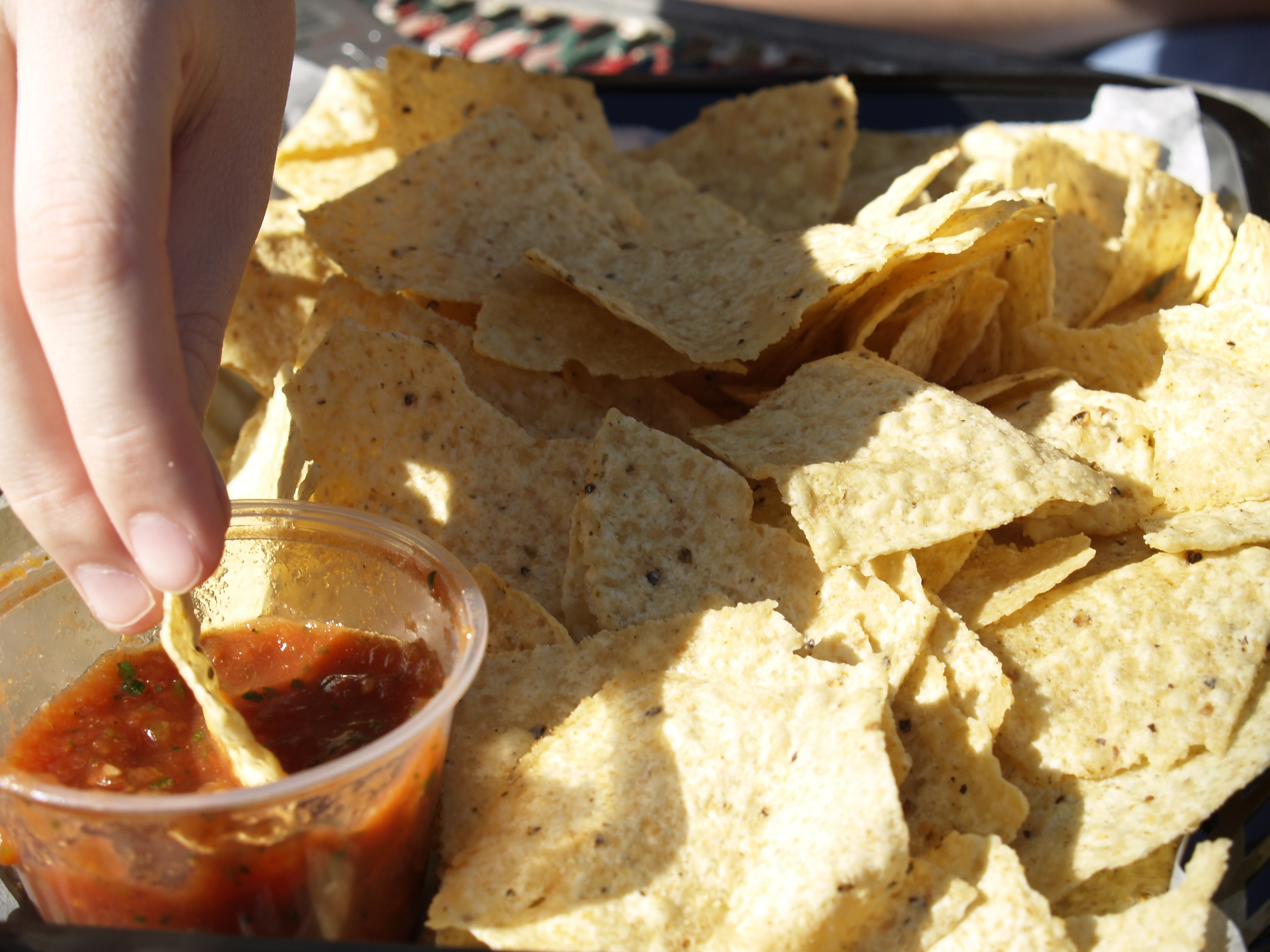
Chips and salsa

Double-dipping involves biting a chip and then re-dipping it into a dip, which some people disapprove of, while others are indifferent. Double-dipping ostensibly transfers bacteria from a person's mouth into a dip, which can then be transferred to other consumers' mouths. The term double dipping, although it had existed since at least the mid twentieth century, was popularized in the 1993 Seinfeld episode "The Implant".

In March 2013, Tostitos, a U.S. brand of tortilla chips and dips, hired the Ketchum communications agency to perform a survey concerning double dipping that polled over 1,000 Americans. The survey found that 46% of male participants double-dip at a party, compared to 32% of females. 54% stated that they would not consume dip after seeing another person double-dip, and 22% stated that they did not care. 25% stated that they would verbally object to a person caught double-dipping.

A study performed by the Department of Food Science and Human Nutrition at Clemson University claimed that three to six instances of double-dipping "would transfer about 10,000 bacteria from the eater's mouth to the remaining dip", which corresponds with "about 50-100 bacteria from one mouth to another in every bite." The study's conclusion recommended that double-dipping should, in their opinion, be curtailed, including tips to prevent it from occurring. The pH of the dip also affects the bacterial growth; higher acidity reduces the bacteria in the dip over time.

A segment on MythBusters in 2009 tested how much bacteria is transferred during the process of double-dipping, finding that there is a transfer but that it "adds only a few more microbes".

== National Chip and Dip Day ==
National Chip and Dip Day occurs in the United States annually on March 23.

== In popular culture ==
Double-dipping was used as a plot point in the Seinfeld episode "The Implant". One of the main characters, George, argues at a funeral reception with his girlfriend's brother (Timmy) when he is accused of double-dipping a chip. This episode inspired the 2009 segment on MythBusters.

== See also ==
- Cheese and crackers
- Dipping sauce
- List of potato dishes
- List of snack foods
