= Refried beans =

Mexican dish of cooked mashed beans

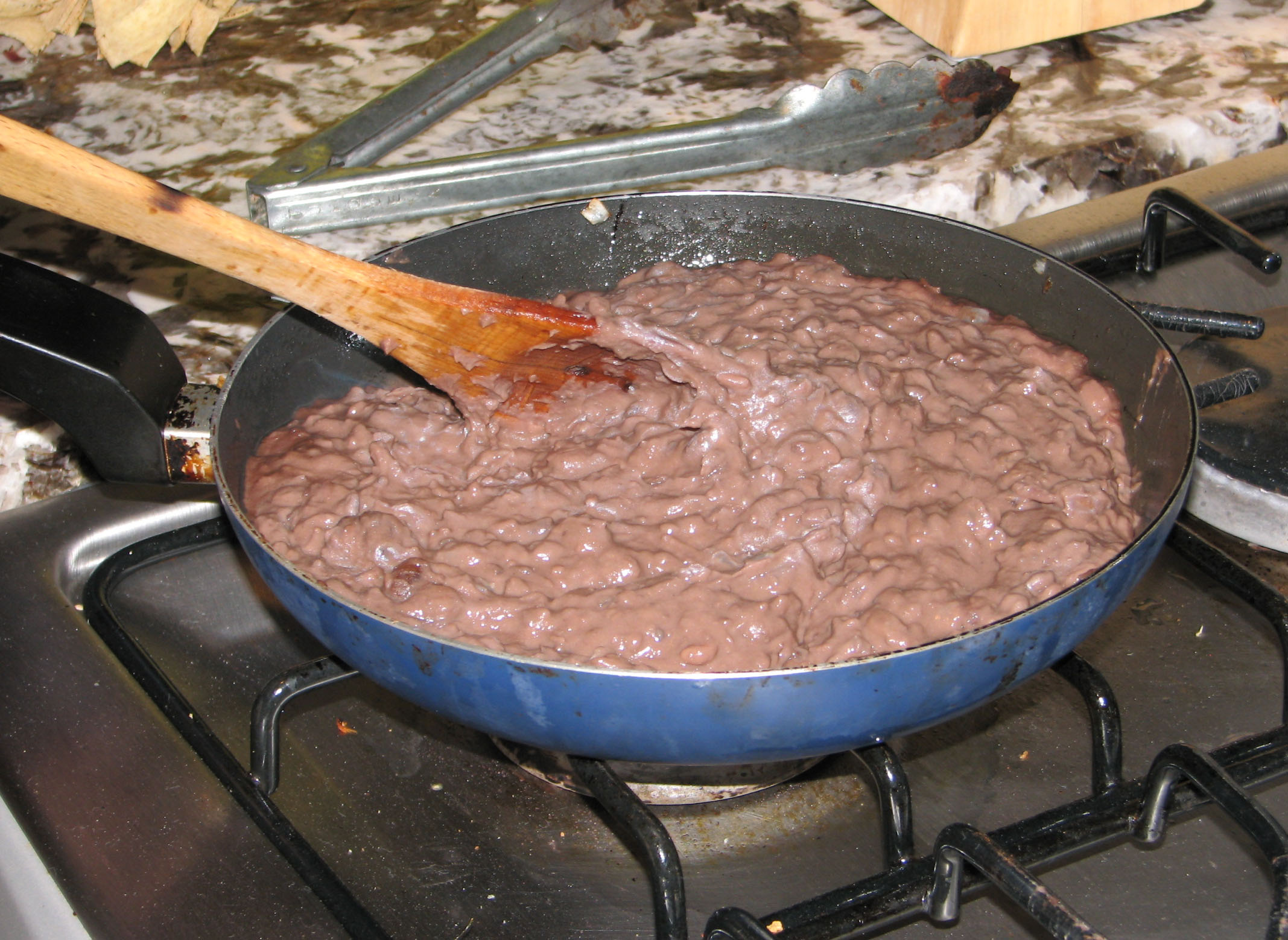
Refried beans being prepared in a frying pan

Refried beans (from Spanish: frijoles refritos, lit. 'well-fried beans') is a dish of cooked and mashed beans that is a traditional staple of Mexican and Tex-Mex cuisines, although each cuisine has a different approach when making the dish. Refried beans are also popular in many other Latin American countries. In this dish, after being boiled and then mashed into a paste, the beans are fried or baked (though they are fried only once).

The English "refried beans" is a mistranslation, since the essence of "frijoles refritos" is the reheating and mashing of the beans; the term "refried" is misleading. As described by Rick Bayless, "they're refritos—not fried again, as you might assume, but 'well fried' or 'intensely fried'."

== Ingredients and preparation ==
In Northern Mexico and Tex-Mex cuisine, refried beans are usually prepared with pinto beans, but many other varieties of bean are used in other parts of Mexico, such as black, or red kidney beans. The raw beans can be cooked when dry or soaked overnight, then stewed, drained of most of the remaining liquid, and converted into a paste with a masher (such as a potato masher), or pressed through a fine mesh sieve (to remove the skins). Some of the drained liquid, or chicken, beef, or vegetable stock, is added if the consistency is too dry. The paste is then baked or fried, usually with onion and garlic in a small amount of lard, vegetable oil, bacon drippings or butter, and seasoned to taste with salt and spices. In Mexico, lard is most often used, and this has a large effect on flavor. Epazote is a common herb used to add flavor to the dish; it is also a carminative (i.e. it reduces the intestinal gas associated with beans).

== Usage ==
In home cooking, refried beans are often served as a side dish accompanying a larger meal or rolled in a tortilla to form a bean burrito.

In the United States, refried beans are most commonly made from pinto beans. They are served as a side dish with most Tex-Mex restaurant meals. They also have become very popular as a dip for maize tortilla chips. Refried beans are also a primary ingredient in many tostada, chimichanga, and pupusa recipes. Additionally, they are a typical ingredient in layered dips, such as seven-layer dip, or in nachos.

== See also ==
- List of legume dishes
