= The Good Bean =

U.S. snack food company

- Type: Snack Foods
- Headquarters: Berkeley, California, U.S.
- Website: www.thegoodbean.com

The Good Bean is a snack food company founded by Sarah Wallace and Suzanne Slatcher in 2010, and based in Berkeley, California, U.S., specializing in chickpea-based snacks. Its Roasted Chickpea Snacks are "Desi" variety chickpeas, dry roasted and tossed in spices. The Fruit & No-Nut Bar is a nut-free variation of the fruit and nut energy bar.

== Awards ==
- Graphic Design USA - "2011 American Graphic Design Awards" for Roasted Chickpea Snack package design
- Graphic Design USA - "2012 American Graphic Design Awards" for Fruit & No-Nut Bar package design
- Daily Candy – "Best Snacks Roundup 2012"
