= Seven-layer dip =

American appetizer

Seven-layer or Tex-Mex dip
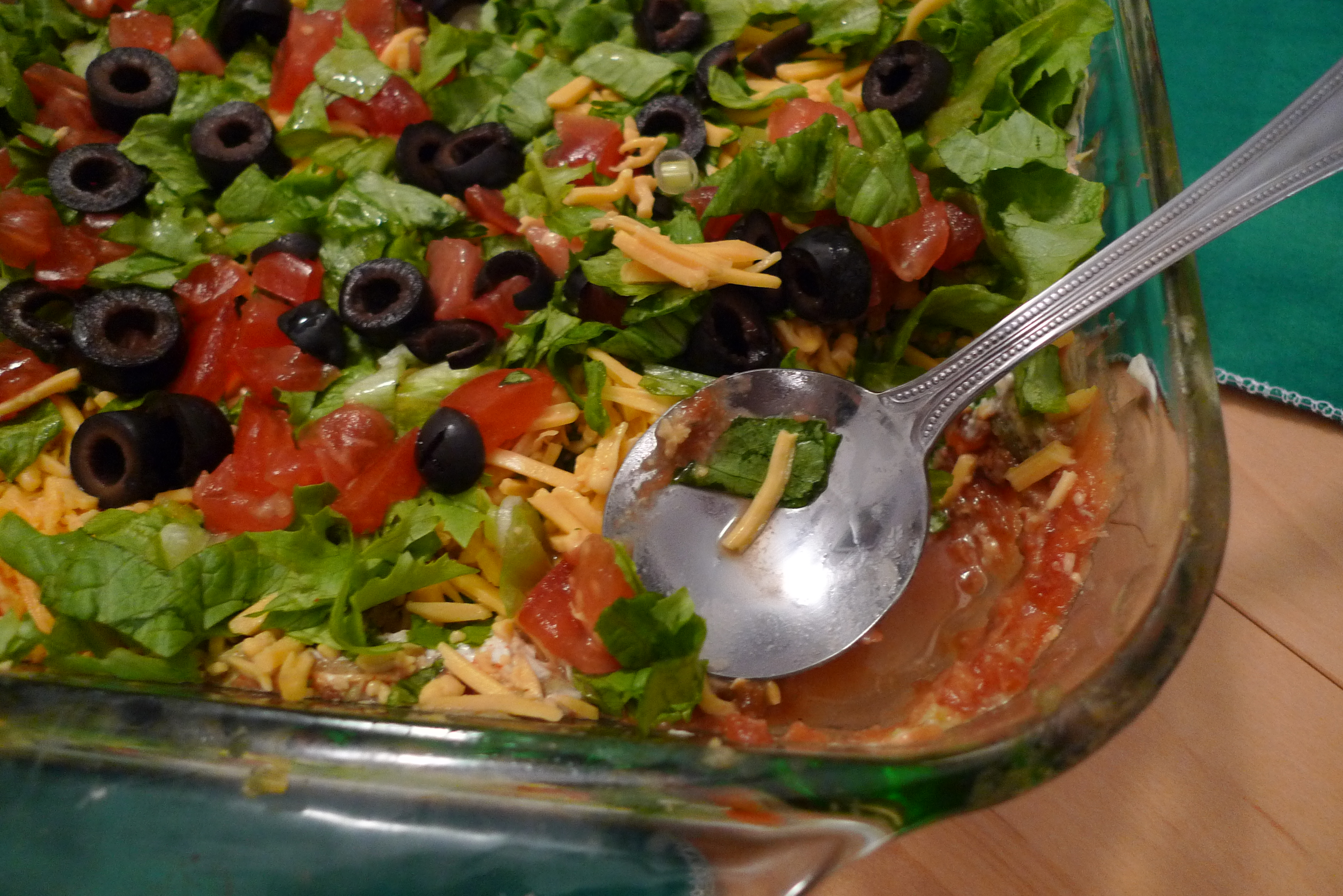
- Type: Dip
- Course: Appetizer or Hors d'oeuvre
- Main ingredients: Refried beans, guacamole, sour cream, cheese, black olives, pico de gallo or salsa roja or chopped tomatoes or salsa verde

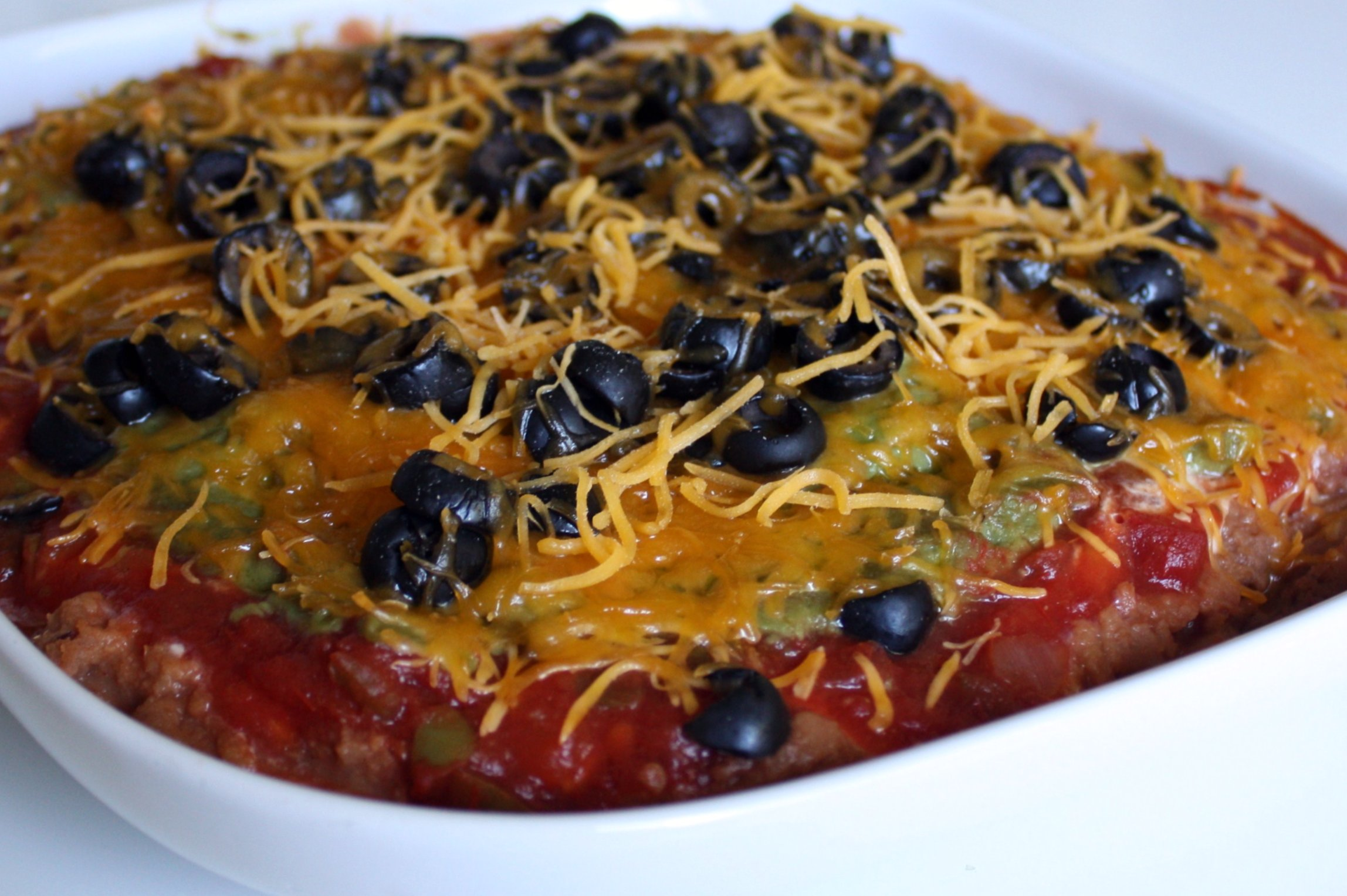
A seven-layer bean dip

A seven-layer dip is an American appetizer based on ingredients typical of Tex-Mex cuisine. The first widely published recipe (1981, Family Circle magazine) called it Tex-Mex Dip without reference to any layers. The dish was popular in Texas for some time before the recipe first appeared in print.

The dish typically includes:

1. Refried beans (originally commercial jalapeño bean dip)
2. Guacamole (originally mashed seasoned avocados)
3. Sour cream (originally a mixture of sour cream & mayonnaise seasoned with commercial taco seasoning mix)
4. Pico de gallo, salsa roja, salsa verde or chopped tomatoes (originally simply chopped green onions, tomatoes and onions)
5. Grated cheddar cheese, Monterey Jack cheese, queso asadero, queso Chihuahua or a blend (some early recipes substituted processed commercial jalapeño cheese dip - or homemade chile con queso)
6. Black olives
7. Optional ingredients and variations include many items such as chopped onion, cooked ground beef, shredded lettuce (for texture), or sliced jalapeño chiles for additional spiciness.

The dish is often chilled when not served immediately. Originally served with corn chips, seven-layer dip is now served most often with tortilla chips.

== See also ==
- Bean dip
- Chips and dip
- Dip (food)
  - List of dips
- List of hors d'oeuvre
- Seven-layer salad
