= Spinach dip =

Dip made with spinach

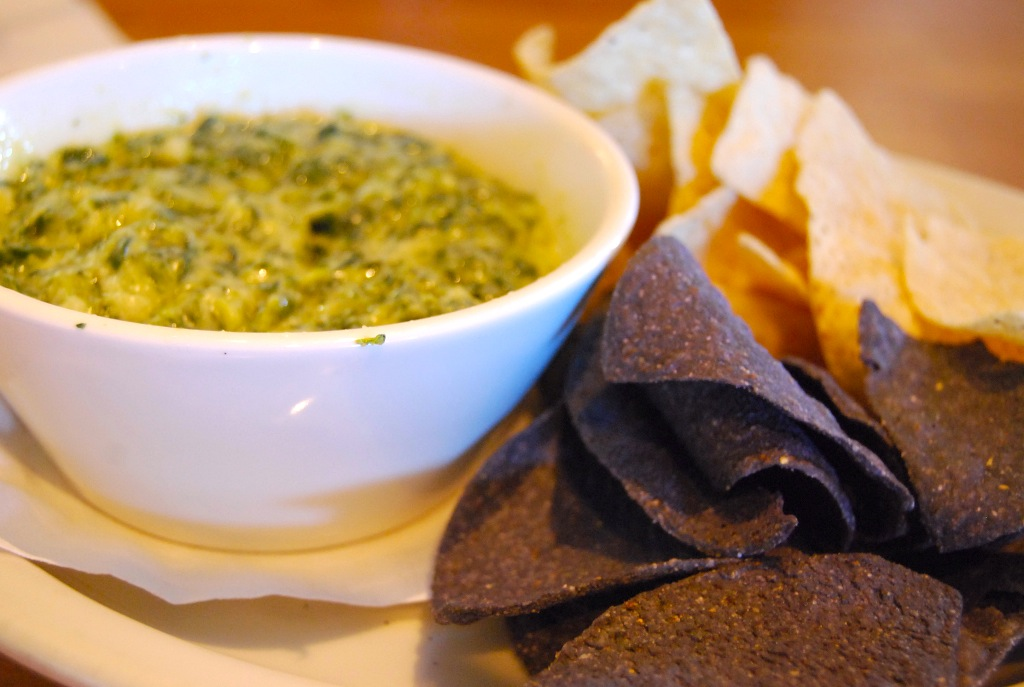
- Spinach and artichoke dip with blue tortilla chips
- Type: Dip
- Serving temperature: Cold or hot
- Main ingredients: Spinach
- Ingredients generally used: Mayonnaise, cream cheese, sour cream and cheese

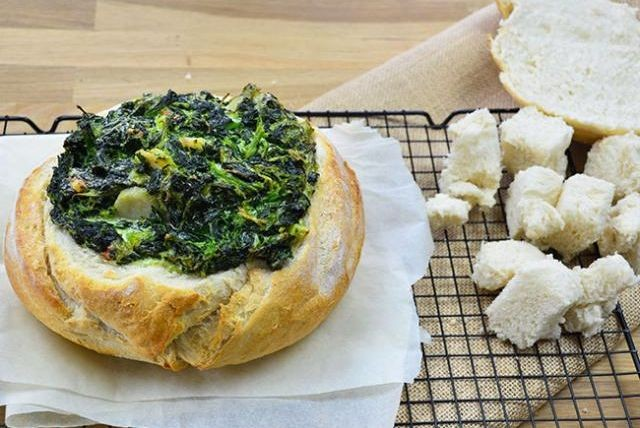
Spin dip in a cob loaf

Spinach dip (sometimes casually spin dip) is a dip that uses the vegetable spinach as a primary ingredient. Frozen spinach is often used in its preparation. Slow cookers may be used to prepare the dip, and it may be served warm, or there may be no cooking involved. Additional primary ingredients include mayonnaise, cream cheese, sour cream and cheese. Examples of accompaniments to spinach dip include bread, crackers and chips.

The dip is commonly eaten as an hors d'oeuvre, appetizer, or party platter. Many casual restaurant chains offer spinach dip on their menus. Several commercially prepared, mass-produced spinach dips are sold in grocery stores and supermarkets. Some commercial powdered mixes, such as Knorr, are available to flavor the dip.

== Presentation ==
The dip is well-suited to a simple presentation: being served in a small bowl or large ramekin. A bread bowl prepared using hollowed-out bread that is filled with spinach dip is another method of presentation. Spinach dips are sometimes served warm.

== Variations ==
Spinach-artichoke dip is one common variation, with artichoke hearts utilized as the other primary ingredient. Ingredient additions may include beans. Some recipes use spinach dip as a filling within other foods, like bread rolls.

== See also ==
- List of dips
- List of condiments
- Spinach soup
- Artichoke dip
- Creamed spinach
