= Dipping sauce =

Type of condiment

Dip
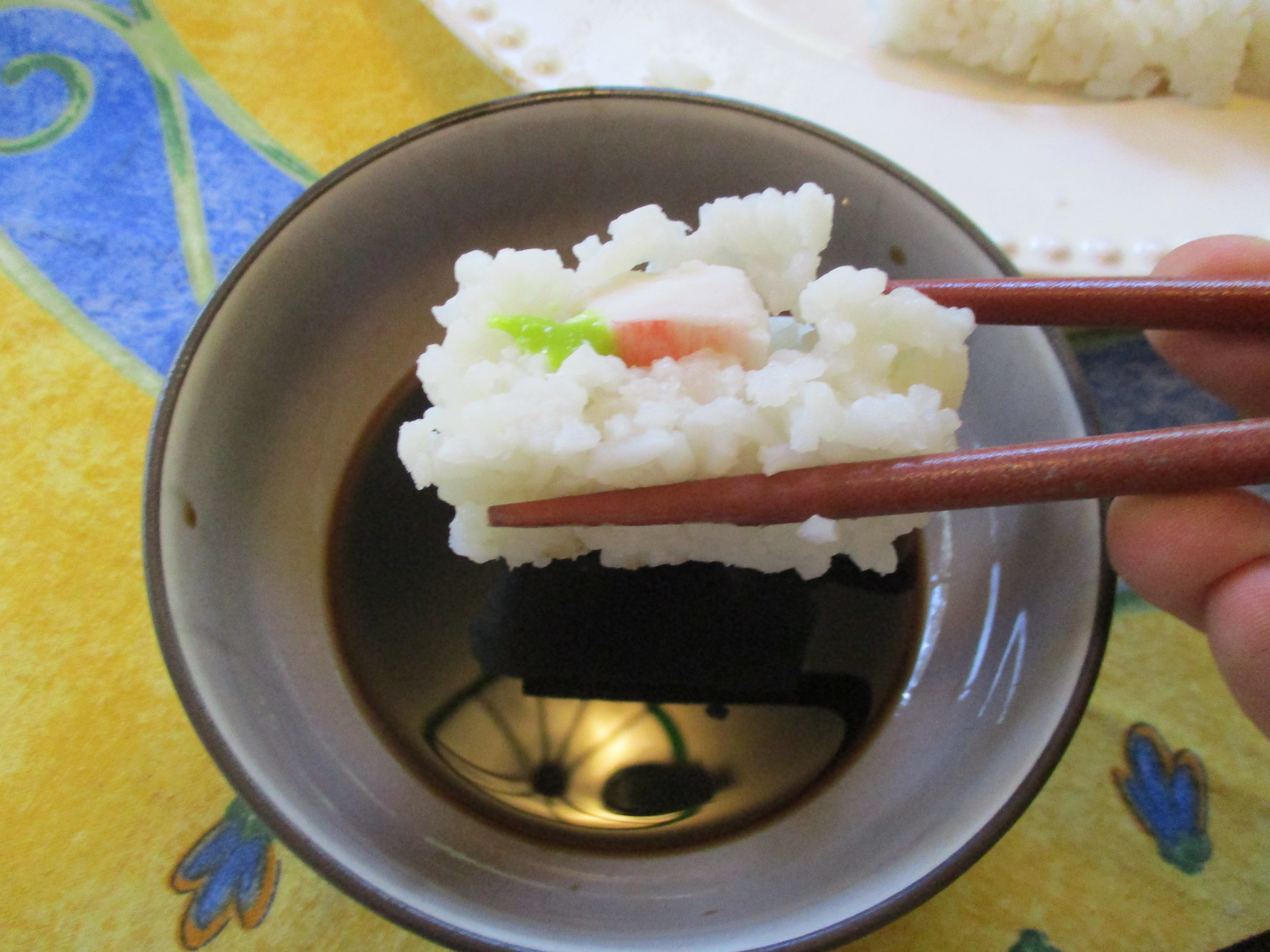
- Sushi being dipped into soy sauce
- Alternative names: Dipping sauce
- Type: Condiment

A dip or dipping sauce is a common condiment for many types of food. Dips are used to add flavor or texture to a food, such as pita bread, dumplings, crackers, chopped raw vegetables, fruits, seafood, cubed pieces of meat and cheese, potato chips, tortilla chips, falafel, and sometimes even whole sandwiches in the case of jus. Unlike other sauces, instead of applying the sauce to the food, the food is typically placed or dipped into the sauce.

Dips are commonly used for finger foods, appetisers, and other food types. Thick dips based on sour cream, crème fraîche, milk, yogurt, mayonnaise, soft cheese, or beans are a staple of American hors d'oeuvres and are lighter than spreads, which can be thinned to make dips.

Dips in various forms are eaten all over the world and people have been using sauces for dipping for thousands of years.

== List of common dips ==
A non-exhaustive list of common dips:

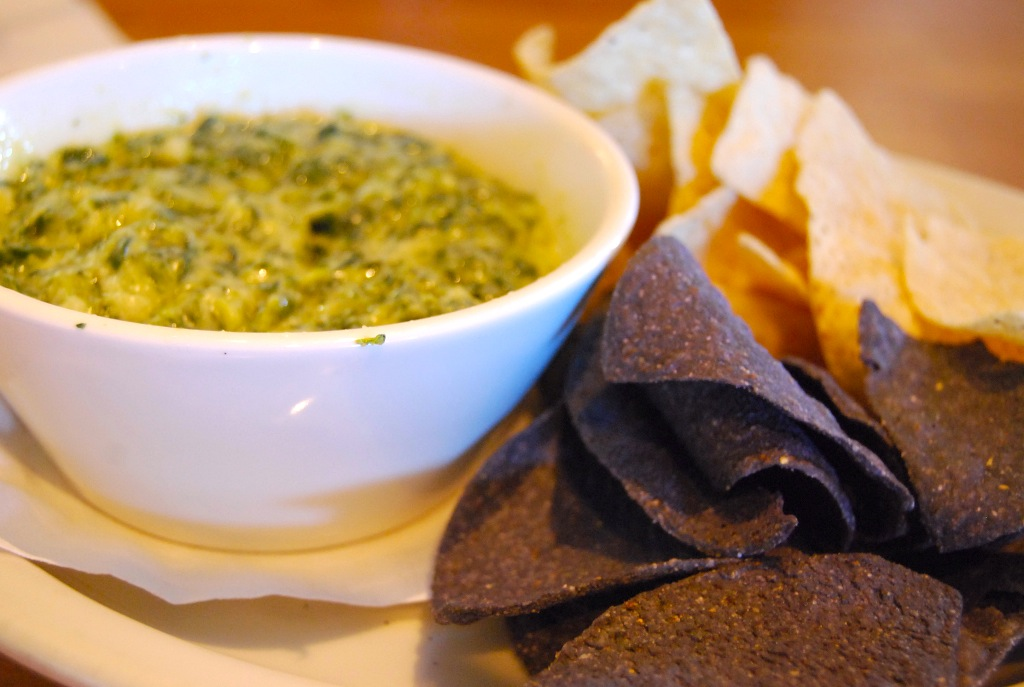
Spinach and artichoke dip with tortilla chips

- Artichoke dip
- Bean dip, dip made from refried beans
- Blue cheese dressing, commonly used as a dip for raw vegetables or Buffalo wings
- Brine, saltwater used as a dip for food, similarly to vinegar or soy sauce
- Cheese sauce
- Chocolate, a dip for various fruits, doughnuts, profiteroles and marshmallows
- Garlic butter sauce, used for dipping seafood, chicken, beef and pizza; plain clarified butter or drawn butter are more common with lobster, crab or clams
- Hazelnut butter or hazelnut spread, commonly used as a dip for crackers and cookies
- Honey, a common dip for chicken and biscuits
- Honey mustard
- Hot sauce or chili sauce, a spicy dip made from peppers
- Ketchup (also called catsup or tomato sauce), often used with French fries, onion rings, and a variety of other foods. Tomato ketchup is the most common, originates in United States, and is now used worldwide. Other varieties exist, such as mushroom ketchup, banana ketchup, curry ketchup, and fruit ketchup.
- Marinara sauce, a tomato sauce served with breadsticks and pizza, among other foods. Widely used in Italian-American cuisine; known as alla marinara in Italy.
- Mustard, ground seeds of the mustard plant. Used worldwide, variants are used in Eastern European and Asian cuisine.
- Olive oil. Originates in Ancient Greek, Ancient Roman, and in Mediterranean cuisines, is used worldwide.
- Sour cream, on its own or combined with mayonnaise and/or other ingredients, a common dip for potato chips
- Spinach dip, for tortilla chips and vegetables
- Sweet and sour sauce, a generic term for many styles of sauce
- Vinegar, used as a dip for grilled meats, and steamed crabs; Balsamic vinegar is also commonly used as a dipping sauce for bread

== List of regional dips ==
Regional varieties of dip originate in, and are used in particular places of the world, while many have spread worldwide:

=== Africa ===
- Matbucha, a North African dip consisting consisting of slow-cooked tomatoes, bell peppers and garlic

=== Asia ===
Various chutneys

- Chili oil, used as a dipping sauce for meat and dim sum.
- Chogochujang, a variant of gochujang; a dip for seafood including hoe, oyster, and wakame, or for raw vegetables
- Chutney, eaten with snacks like deep-fried samosas and pakoras, dosa and idli
- Fish sauce (garum), or nam pla, used in southeastern Asian cuisines as a dip for snacks and other foods
- Oyster sauce. Popular in South-East Asia.
- Plum sauce, used for dipping fried noodles, dumplings, and other foods. Originates in Cantonese cuisine.
- Prahok ktis, a sauce made with prahok, minced pork, kroeung, and coconut cream eaten with fresh vegetables. Originates in Cambodia.
- Sambal, for fish, chicken, etc. Originates from Indonesia.
- Soy sauce, often served in small saucers for dipping a variety of East Asian foods; for sushi and sashimi, prepared wasabi is mixed in
- Tentsuyu, a Japanese dipping sauce

==== Philippines ====
- Banana ketchup, a Filipino condiment made from bananas; used similarly to tomato ketchup
- Fish paste or bagoong, fermented fish paste, used in southeastern Asian cuisines as a dip for rice dishes
- Toyomansi, a Filipino meat or fish dip made with soy sauce and calamansi juice; chilis may also be added to create "silimansi"

==== Thailand ====
- Nam chim, Thai dipping sauces which most often contain chili peppers
- Nam phrik, Thai chili pastes which are also used as dips for vegetables and fried fish
- Prik nam pla (Thai) mixes of chili peppers and fish sauce
- Sriracha sauce

==== Vietnam ====
- Mắm nêm, made of fermented fish. Originates in Vietnam.
- Nước chấm (Vietnamese), mixes of chili peppers and fish sauce
- Tương, a dipping sauce made from fermented soybeans in Vietnamese cuisine

=== Europe ===
- Horseradish sauce, often made of horseradish mixed with sour cream or mayonnaise. Common in UK and Denmark, and Eastern and Central Europe.

==== Western Europe ====
- Au jus, a salty beef broth or gravy, especially used for dipping French dip sandwiches
- Bagna càuda, a regional dish of the Italian Piedmont
- Curry ketchup, also called Currygewürzketchup in Germany; a spicier form of ketchup. Although curry itself originates in the Indian subcontinent, curry ketchup is from northern parts of Europe, and is common in Belgium, the Netherlands, Germany, and Scandinavia.
- Fondue, a blend of melted cheese and wine in which bread is dipped
- French onion dip
- Fritessaus, a leaner form of mayonnaise from The Netherlands
- Hollandaise
- Mayonnaise, the basis for many dips; on its own a dip for cold chicken, vegetables, French fries, and seafood. Originates in France and Spain, used worldwide.
- Mint sauce, made with ground mint leaves and vinegar or yogurt. Popular in the UK.
- Pinzimonio, an Italian dip based on olive oil
- Remoulade, often used with fried foods such as fish, or chips (french fries or fries). Originates from France.
- Romesco, used as a dip or as a condiment for other dishes. Originates from Catalonia.
- Tartar sauce, commonly used with seafood. Originates in France. Common in UK, Commonwealth, and North American cuisines.
- Vin Santo, into which cantucci (biscotti) are dipped. Originates in Italy.
- Worcestershire sauce

==== Southern Europe ====
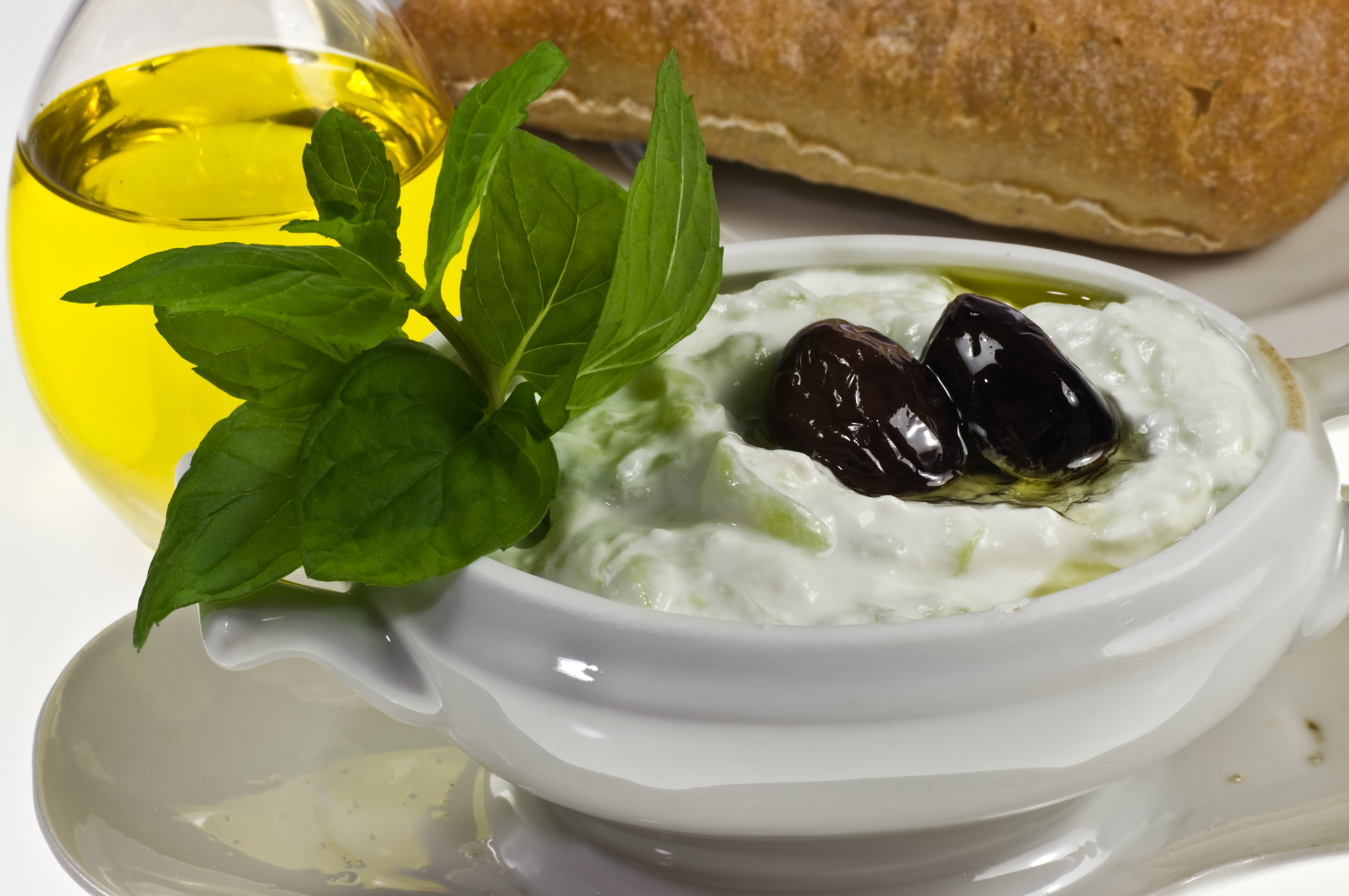
Tzatziki

- Ajvar, made from red bell peppers with garlic, found in Macedonian cuisine, Bosnian cuisine and Serbian cuisine
- Taramosalata, a Near Eastern dip of carp or codfish roe. Originates in Greece.
- Tirokafteri, a feta-based Greek meze
- Tzatziki and similar sauces used for dipping include tarator and Raita. Southern Europe and Western Asia.

==== Eastern Europe ====
- Smetana, a type of sour cream and a common dip for bliny, pelmeni, vareniki. Has different regional names, is common in Central, Eastern (incl. the Baltics and Ukraine), and Southern Europe, the Caucasus, Central Asia, and Russia.

=== The Caucasus ===
- Ajika, a spicy, subtly flavored dip in Caucasian cuisine, based on hot red pepper, garlic, herbs and spices. Caucasian ajika is very hot, while lighter varieties have emerged in the Baltics.
- Mkhali (colloquially pkhali), Georgian vegetable purées thickened with walnut paste and often rolled into balls
- Satsivi, a walnut dip in Georgian cuisine
- Tkemali, a cherry plum sauce in Georgian cuisine

=== Middle East ===
- Baba ghanoush, a dip made from eggplant, common in the Eastern Mediterranean and parts of South Asia
- Gravy, used as a dipping sauce for bread, such as in Maghrebi cuisine
- Haroseth, Jewish dipping sauce based on local Israeli ground fruits and spices
- Hilbeh, Yemenite condiment made from ground fenugreek seeds
- Hummus, a Levantine dip of ground chickpeas and sesame tahini with spices and lemon juice
- Muhammara, a Near Eastern hot pepper and walnut dip
- Tahina, a Middle-Eastern condiment made from toasted ground sesame

=== Latin America ===
- Ají, a spicy sauce popular in Latin American cuisine, often served as a condiment to complement main dishes
- Chimichurri, a dip from Argentina made of parsley, garlic, and oregano
- Guacamole, avocadoes mashed with lime juice, onions, tomatoes, and herbs; commonly eaten with tortilla chips
- Nacho cheese, for dipping tortilla chips
- Pebre, a Chilean mix of tomato, onion, chile, and coriander
- Pico de gallo

=== North America ===
- Barbecue sauce, often used for grilled and fried meats in the United States
- Buffalo sauce, often used as both a coating for Buffalo wings as well as a standalone dipping sauce for other foods
- Chile con queso, used in Tex-Mex cuisine with tortilla chips
- Clam dip, a condiment for dipping crackers and chips. Originates from United States.
- Cocktail sauce, a dip for seafood made from ketchup or chili sauce and horseradish. United States.
- Comeback sauce, a dip for chicken fingers made from mayonnaise and chili sauce. Originates in central Mississippi.
- Crab dip, a thick dip popular in Maryland usually made from cream cheese and lump crab meat
- Duck sauce, a modern variation of plum sauce in American Chinese cuisine.
- Fry sauce, a dip eaten with French fries, onion rings, chicken strips, and other deep-fried foods. Originates in United States.
- Pimento cheese
- Ranch dressing, buttermilk flavored salad dressing popular in the United States
- Salsa, used often with tortilla chips. Originates in Mexico, and popularised in Mexican-American cuisines. Tortilla chips in salsa are ubiquitous in Mexican-American restaurants, but not in Mexico itself.
- Seven-layer dip, a dip containing ingredients common to Tex-Mex cuisine

=== Oceania ===
- Kiwi onion dip, a New Zealand snack food served with potato chips, crackers, or chopped vegetables

== See also ==
- Chips and dip
- List of food pastes
- List of foods
- List of sauces
- List of spreads
- Paste (food)
- Spread (food)
- Condiment
- Chutney
