= Crab dip =

Dip typically prepared from cream cheese and crab meat

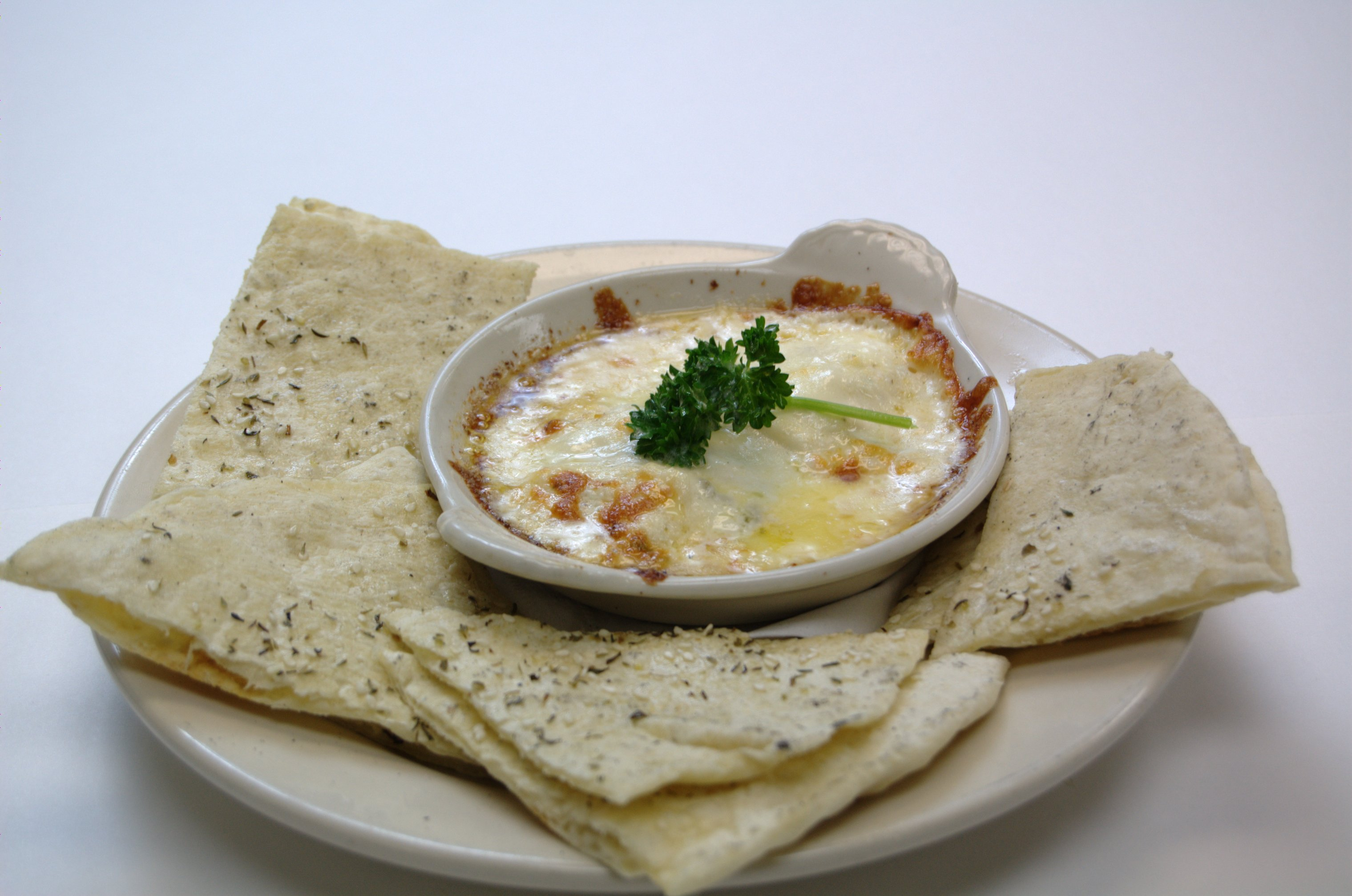
- Crab dip served with flatbread
- Alternative names: Maryland crab dip
- Type: Dip
- Place of origin: United States
- Region or state: Maryland
- Serving temperature: Hot
- Main ingredients: Crab and cream cheese
- Ingredients generally used: Mayonnaise

Crab dip, sometimes referred to as Maryland crab dip, is a thick, creamy dip typically prepared from cream cheese and lump crab meat. Other primary ingredients such as mayonnaise may be used. Various types of crab preparations, species and superfamilies are used, as are a variety of added ingredients. It is typically served hot, although cold versions also exist. Hot versions are typically baked or broiled. It is sometimes served as an appetizer. Accompaniments may include crackers and various breads. Some U.S. restaurants offer crab dip. Commercially produced varieties exist, and some stadiums offer it as a part of their concessions.

== Ingredients ==
Fresh, frozen or canned crab meat may be used in the preparation of crab dip. Different types of crab meat may be used, such as jumbo lump, lump backfin, leg and claw, among others. Various types of crab species and superfamilies are also used, such as blue crab, Dungeness crab and Alaska king crab, among others.

Some versions may use mayonnaise, other types of cheese, such as pepper jack cheese, brie cheese or Cheddar cheese instead of or in addition to cream cheese as primary ingredients. Some may incorporate other seafoods in addition to crab, such as imitation crab, lobster, shrimp and surimi. Additional ingredients may include mushrooms, artichoke, onion, green onion, shallot, green pepper, bread crumbs (such as panko), heavy cream and others. Bread crumbs may be used to top the dish, which may be browned during the cooking process creating a crust. Sometimes Parmesan cheese is combined with the bread crumbs. Some versions use Old Bay Seasoning as an ingredient to add flavor, and some are prepared spicy with the addition of ingredients such as hot sauce and red pepper.

Crab dips

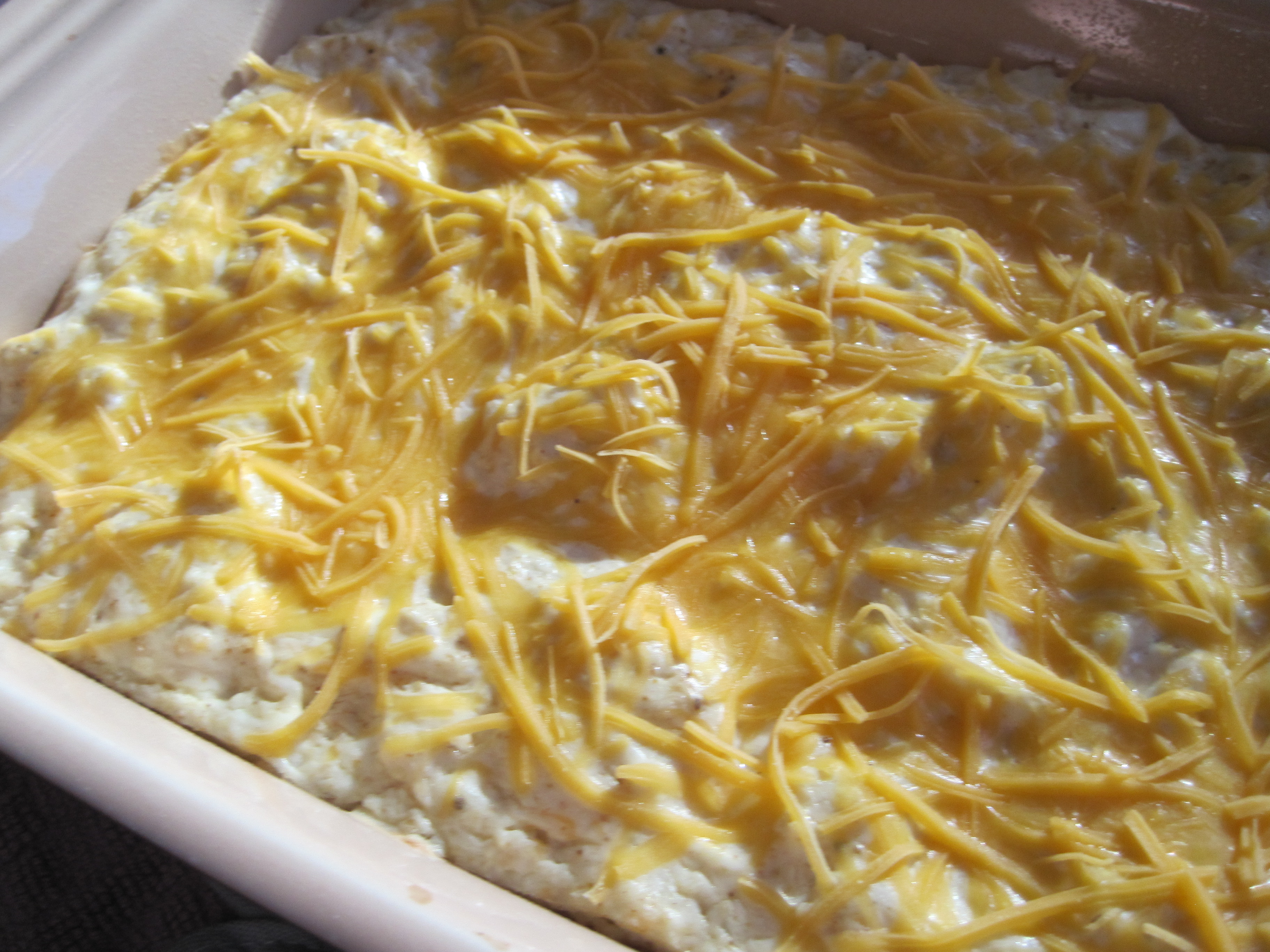
Warm crab dip with cheddar cheese

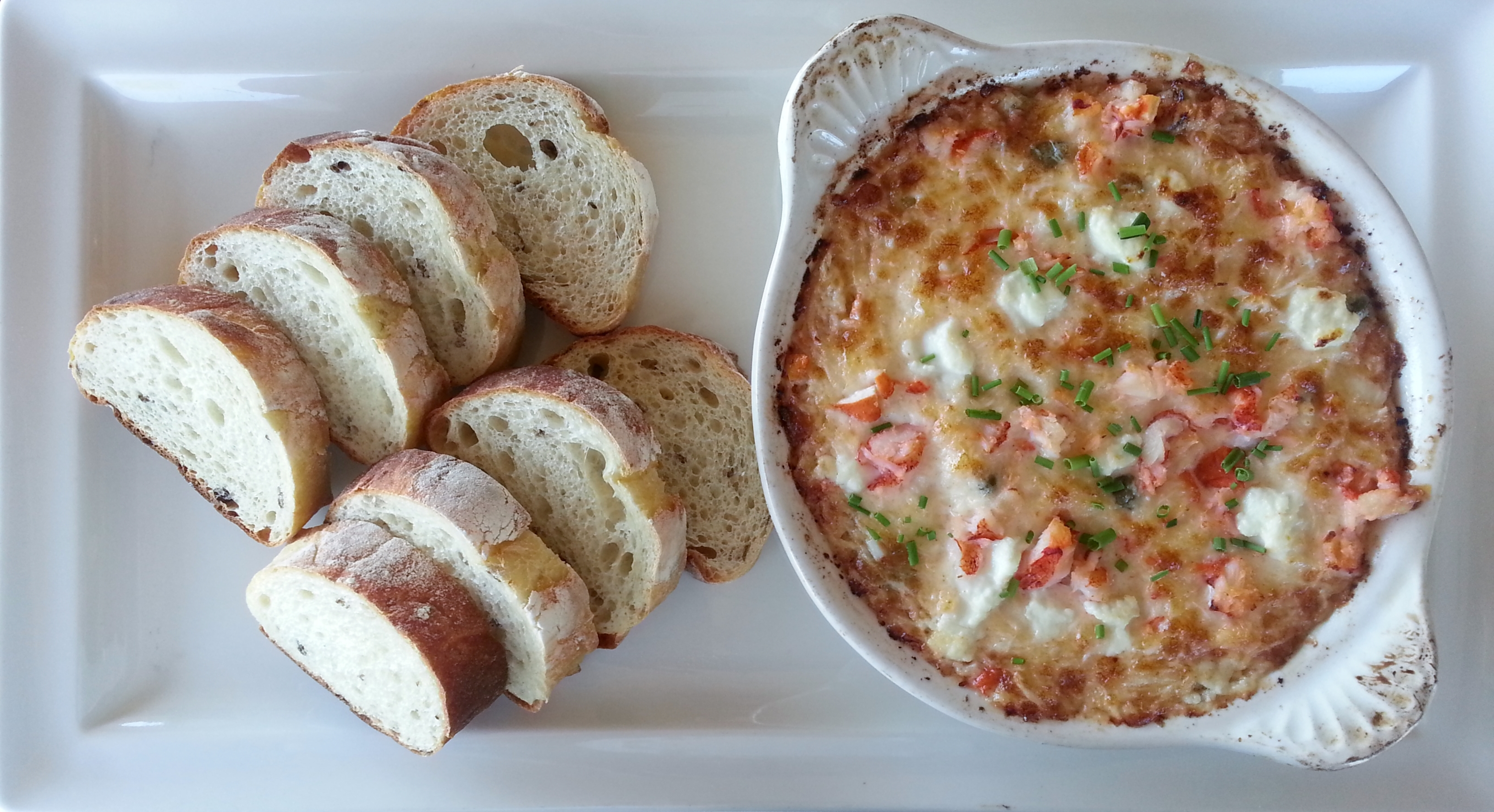
Warm crab and lobster dip served with bread

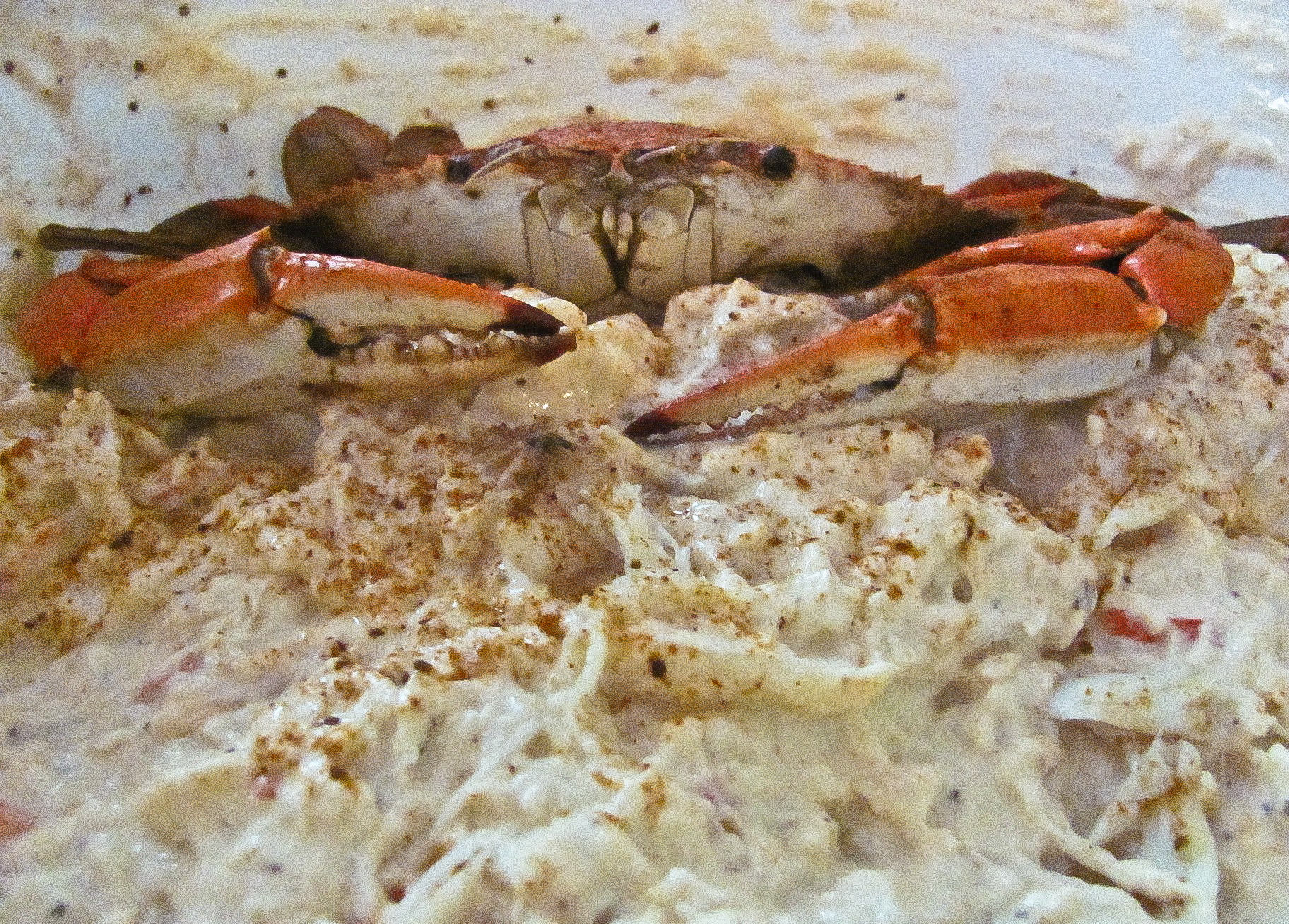
Close-up of crab dip, with a crab atop

== Preparation and service ==
Some U.S. restaurants offer crab dip on their menus. Commercially mass-produced crab dips are also manufactured. Crab dip can be prepared in advance, refrigerated, and cooked at a later time. It may be served in bread that has been hollowed-out, such as a sourdough loaf. Crab dip may be served with crackers, flatbread, pita bread, bread, crostino, pretzels and sliced vegetables, among other accompaniments.

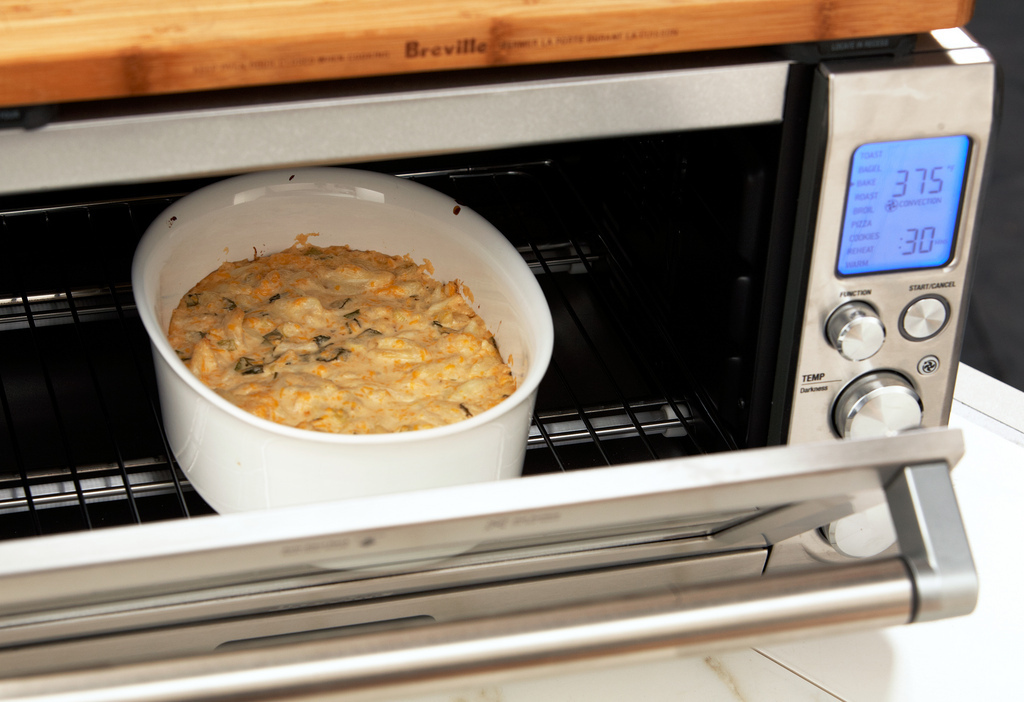
Crab dip being baked in a toaster oven

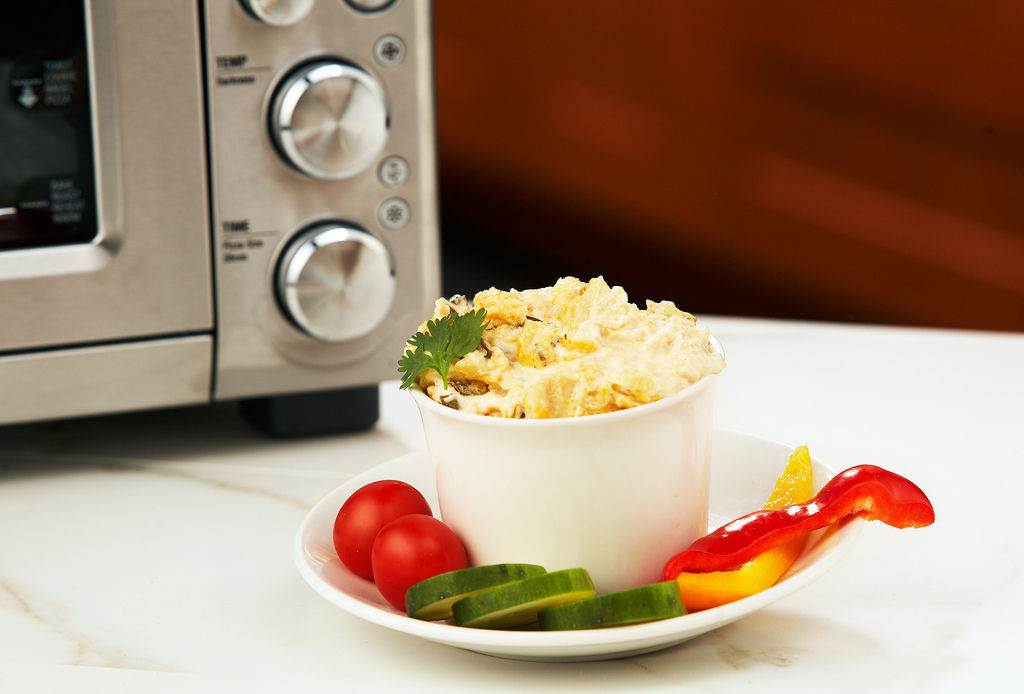
Crab dip served with vegetables

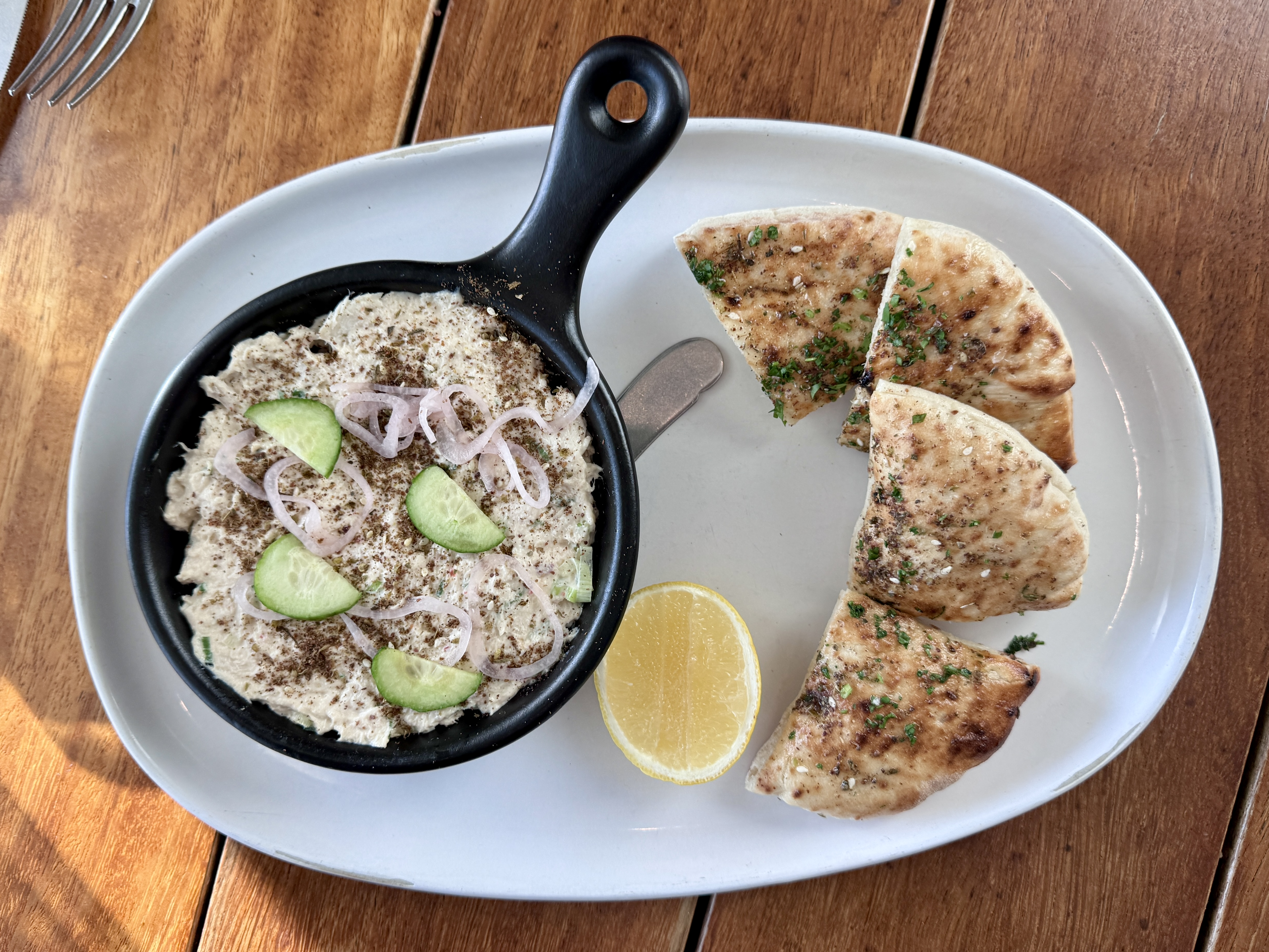
Cold Dungeness crab dip served cucumber, onions and a side of pita bread

== History ==
Lynne Olver, the creator of the website The Food Timeline, describes the modern crab dip as the latest in a line of dishes of creamy minced crab, over time taking different serving temperatures as well as "textures, flavors, and dippers". The earliest Olver cites is English cook Hannah Glasse's 1747 recipe "To Butter Crabs, or Lobsters" in The Art of Cookery Made Plain and Easy:

Take two Crabs, or Lobsters, being boiled, and cold, tale all the Meat out of the Shells and Bodies, mince it small, and put it all together into a Sauce-pan; add to it a Glass of White Wine, two Spoonfuls of Vinegar, a Nutmeg grated, then let it boil up till it is thorough hot; then have ready half Pound fresh Butter, melted with an Anchovy, and the Yolks of two Eggs beat up and mixed with the Butter; then mix Crab and Butter all together, shaking the Sauce-pan constantly round till it is quite hot; then have ready the great Shell, either of the Crab or Lobster, lay it in the Middle of your Dish, pour some into the Shell, and the rest in little Saucers round the Shell, sticking three Corner Toasts between the Saucers, and round the Shell. This is a fine Side-dish at a second Course."

The first American recipe Olver identifies in the crab dip tradition followed 23 years later, in 1770, when South Carolina woman Harriott Pinckney Horry published her book A Colonial Plantation Handbook. Over the following years, recipes appeared under various names, including "Scalloped Crabs", "Cream Crab", "Flaked Crab Meat", and in 1932, "Crab Flake Maryland":

1 lb. lump crab flakes, 1 pint milk, 1/2 pint cream, 1/4 lb. butter, 1/2 oz. salt, 2 pinch cayenne pepper, 1 glass sherry wine, 2 tablespoons flour. Melt half the butter in a sauce-pan, add the flour and make the cream sauce with the heated milk, set aside to keep it hot. Heat the rest of the butter in a sauce-pan, add the crab meat and fry a little, try not to break up the lumps, add salt, pepper, cream sauce and cream. Let boil for two or three minutes, then add the sherry wine, mix well. Make sure that it doesn't boil. Serve very hot in chafing dish with toast.

— Wm. H. Parker, Manager, Hotel Emerson, Baltimore." (p. 47)

It was not until the 1950s that Olver identifies a recipe calling the dish "crab dip", she credits this to the word dip arising in the dipping sauce sense in the period after World War II, (Note: The Oxford English Dictionary dates the earliest use of dip in this sense to 1960.) and the first identified crab dip using cream cheese is listed in 1961 in the Los Angeles Times. Crab dips became popular in the 1970s, prepared in a double boiler or oven, at a time when warm dips were viewed as sophisticated appetizers. When baked, these crab dips were often topped with slivered almonds.

== Stadium concessions ==
The Nationals Park baseball park in the Navy Yard neighborhood of Washington, D.C., the home ballpark for the Washington Nationals, offers a sandwich prepared with a half-smoke, Maryland crab dip and Virginia ham called "The DMV" as part of its concessions. It was reported in August 2014 that Byrd Stadium on the campus of the University of Maryland in College Park, Maryland planned to offer a large 700 g (1 1/2 lb) soft pretzel baked with crab dip and melted cheese that serves four people as part of its concessions. Byrd Stadium also offers other foods prepared with crab, such as nachos and "crab fries".

== See also ==
- Clam dip
- Dipping sauce
- List of crab dishes
- List of hors d'oeuvre
