= Clam dip =

Dipping sauce and condiment

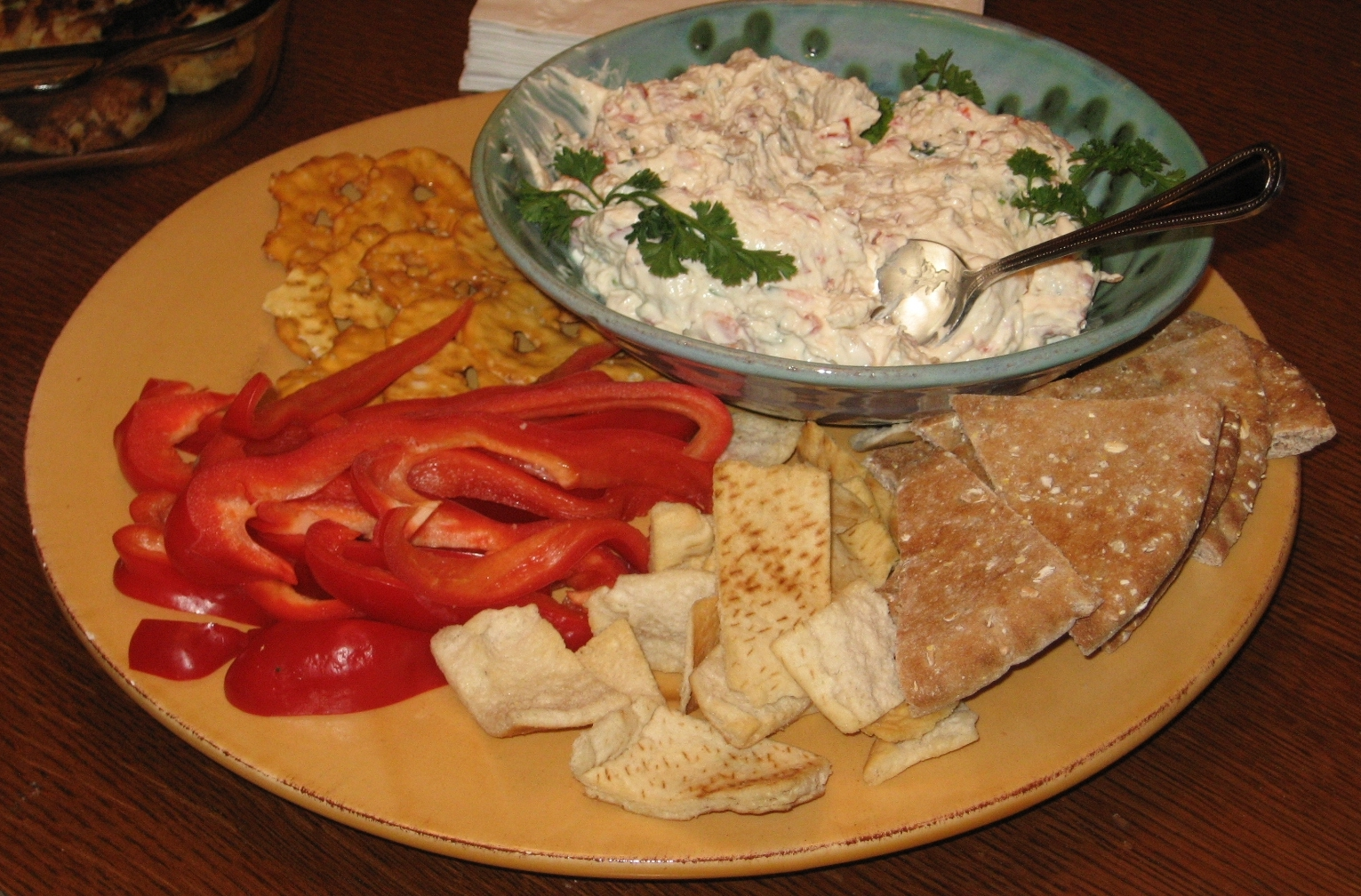
- Chunky clam dip with various foods for dipping
- Type: Dip, snack food
- Course: Sometimes served as an appetizer
- Place of origin: United States
- Serving temperature: Usually chilled, sometimes served hot or at room temperature
- Main ingredients: sour cream and/or cream cheese, chopped or minced clams, various seasonings
- Ingredients generally used: Lemon juice, Worcestershire sauce
- Food energy (per 1 tablespoon serving): 71 kcal (300 kJ)
Nutritional value
(per 1 tablespoon serving)
- Protein: 5 g
- Fat: 5 g
- Carbohydrate: 1 g
- Other information: – Hot clam dip can include melted cheese – Nutrition information source:

Clam dip is a dipping sauce and condiment prepared with clams, sour cream or cream cheese, and various seasonings as primary ingredients. Various additional ingredients can be used. It is usually served chilled, although it is sometimes served hot or at room temperature. It is used as a dip for potato chips, crackers, bread, and crudités. Commercial varieties of clam dip are mass-produced by some companies and marketed to consumers in grocery stores and supermarkets.

== History ==
In the early 1950s, the first recipe for clam dip in the U.S. appeared on the Kraft Music Hall, a radio and television variety program broadcast on NBC from 1933 to 1971. After the recipe segment was broadcast, canned clams in New York City reportedly sold out within 24 hours. The ingredients used in this recipe were minced canned clams, cream cheese, lemon juice, Worcestershire sauce, garlic, salt and pepper. Clam dip remained popular in the U.S. throughout the 1960s and 1970s, at which time prepared manufactured clam dips were readily available in U.S. supermarkets. In the mid to late 1980s, various tomato-based salsas began gaining more favor with American consumers and the popularity of clam dip and other dips made with sour cream and cream cheese declined.

== Preparation ==
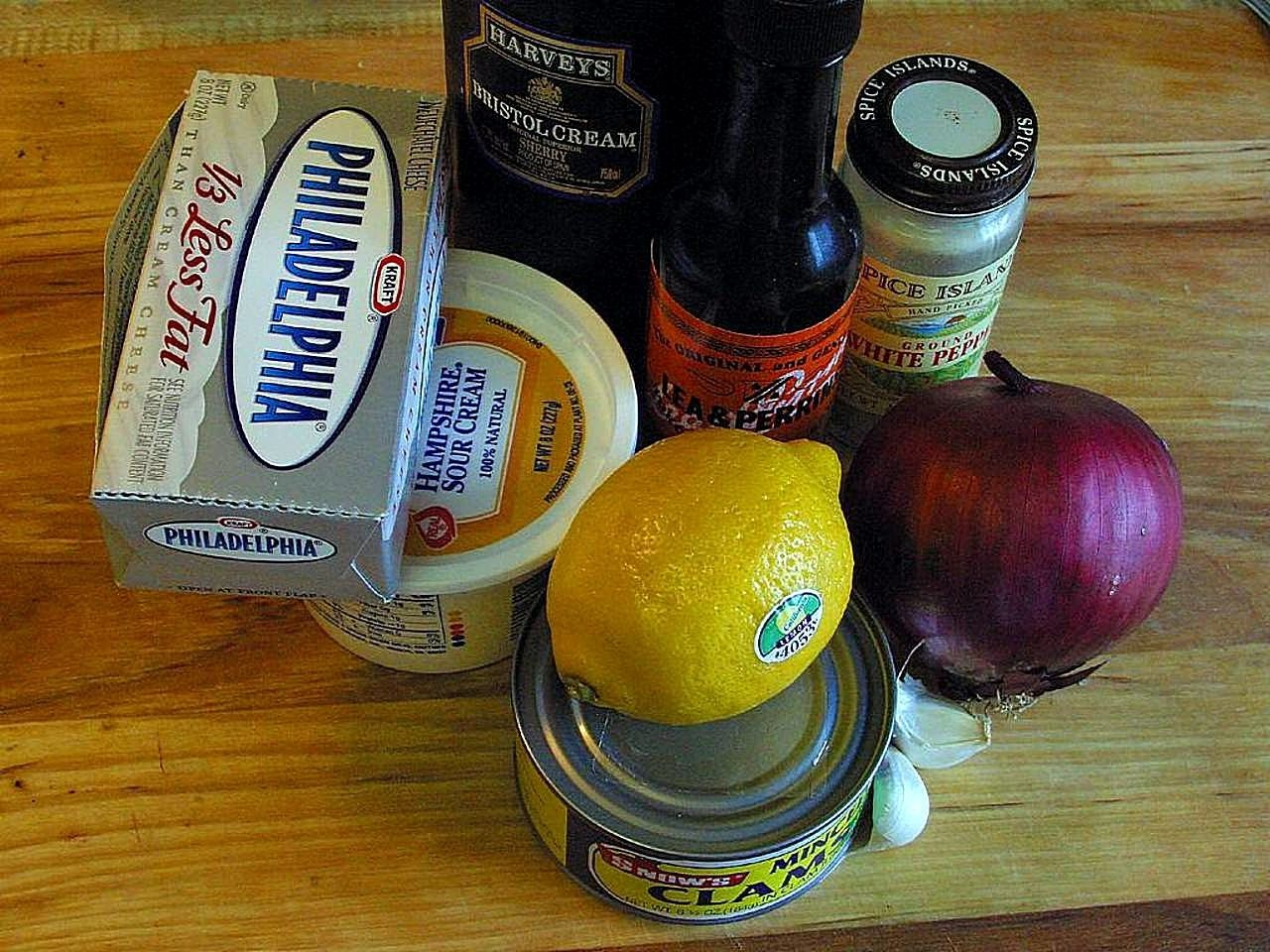
Ingredients to prepare clam dip

Clam dip is typically prepared using canned chopped or minced clams, sour cream or cream cheese, and various seasonings, and usually served chilled. It is used as a dip for potato chips, bread, crackers, and crudités. It has a creamy texture and mouthfeel. Canned, cooked, and frozen or fresh clams may be used, the latter of which can be cooked by steaming or pan cooking. Canned clams can be drained, or the liquid can be retained and used as an ingredient. After refrigeration, the dip may thicken, and the liquid from canned clams can be used to thin the dip. Milk or cream is also sometimes used to thin clam dip. When refrigerated overnight, the flavors of the ingredients intermingle more greatly, resulting in a more flavorful dip. Smoked clams are sometimes used, which imbues a distinct smoky flavor to the dip. The clams can be smoked in the shell and then minced afterward.

Additional ingredients can be used, such as lemon juice, Worcestershire sauce, onion, scallions, shallots, chives, garlic, and pepper sauce. The ingredients can be mixed using a food processor. It is sometimes served as a hot dip, which can be kept warm using a chafing dish, and melted cheese can be used as an ingredient in hot versions. It is also sometimes served at room temperature. Clam dip can be served in a hollowed-out loaf of bread, such as sourdough. It can be garnished with ingredients such as parsley, scallions and paprika. Crudités to accompany the dish can include red peppers, carrots, radishes, and cauliflower, among others. Prepared clam dip can be preserved by storing it in a freezer.

== Commercial varieties ==
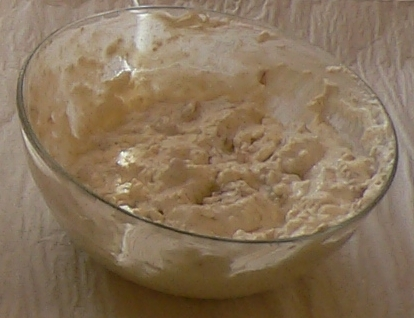
A close-up view of a clam dip

Some companies mass-produce commercial varieties of prepared clam dip and market them to consumers in grocery stores and supermarkets. Commercial varieties are typically packaged in plastic tubs. Prepared clam dip mixes have also been commercially manufactured and marketed to consumers. One such product comes packaged with dried sour cream that is reconstituted using water.

== Nutrition information ==
A one-tablespoon serving of clam dip using the recipe that aired in the early 1950s on the Kraft Music Hall show contains 71 calories, 1 g carbohydrate, 5 g protein, 5 g total fat (with 3 g saturated fat), 25 mg cholesterol and 136 mg sodium.

== See also ==
- Chips and dip
- Crab dip
- French onion dip
- List of clam dishes
- List of condiments
- List of dips
