= Artichoke dip =

Dip made with artichoke

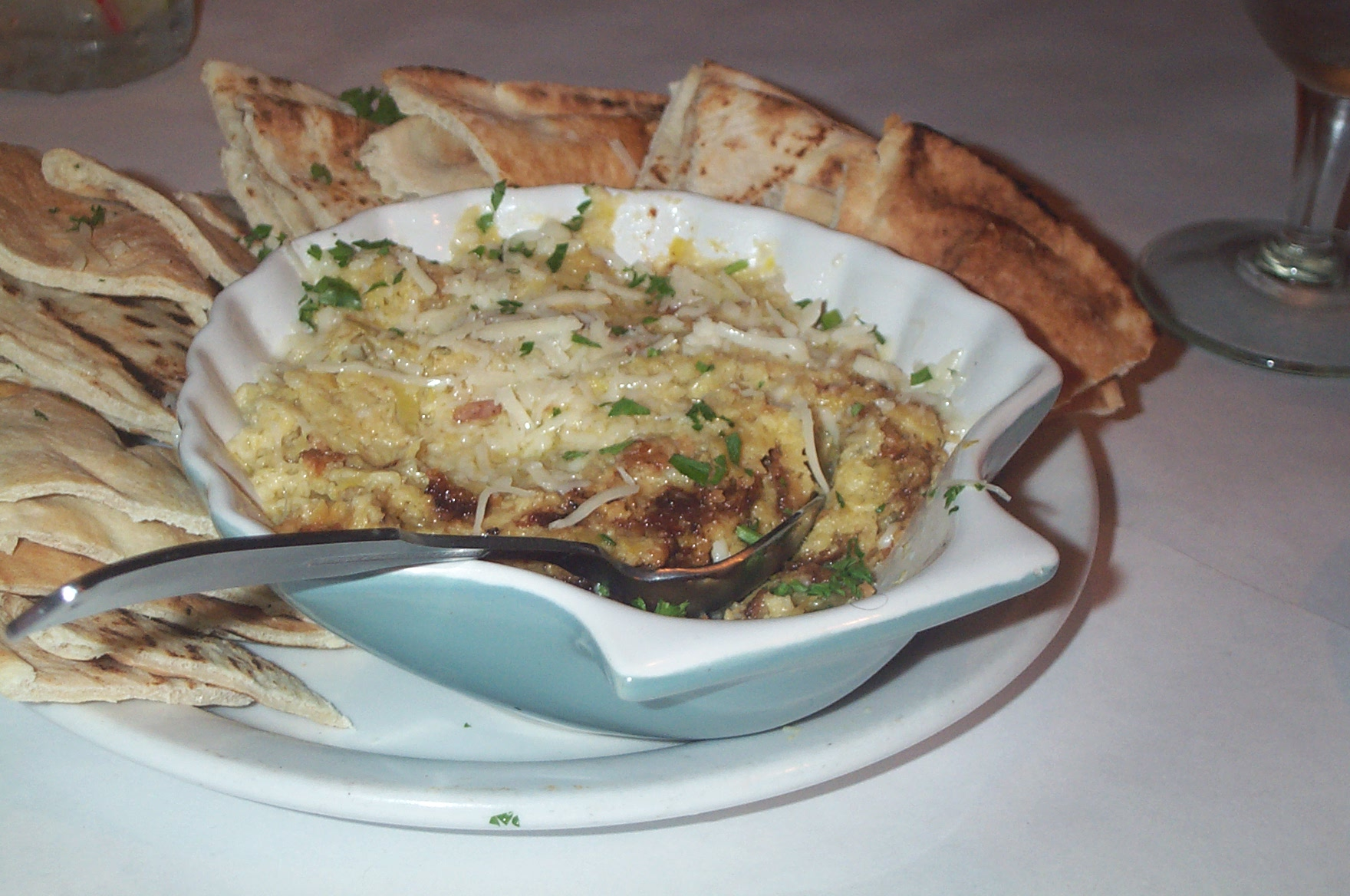
- Artichoke dip with pita bread
- Type: Dip
- Main ingredients: Artichoke
- Ingredients generally used: Lemon juice, olive oil, salt, pepper, mayonnaise, bread crumbs, garlic, basil and Parmesan

Artichoke dip is a dip that uses artichoke as a primary ingredient. Some versions are served chunky, while others are puréed and have a smooth texture. It may be served as an hors d'oeuvre along with crackers or chips for dipping. Commercially prepared artichoke dips are produced for consumer purchase. It has been described as "one of the most popular appetizer menu items of all time".

== Ingredients and preparation ==
Fresh (cooked) or canned/jarred artichokes may be used in the preparation of artichoke dip. Ingredients may include lemon juice, olive oil, salt, pepper, mayonnaise, bread crumbs, garlic, basil and Parmesan. It is sometimes prepared using spinach as an additional primary ingredient. Some versions are baked in an oven, which can give them a brown crust on the top. It is sometimes served in a hollowed-out round of bread.

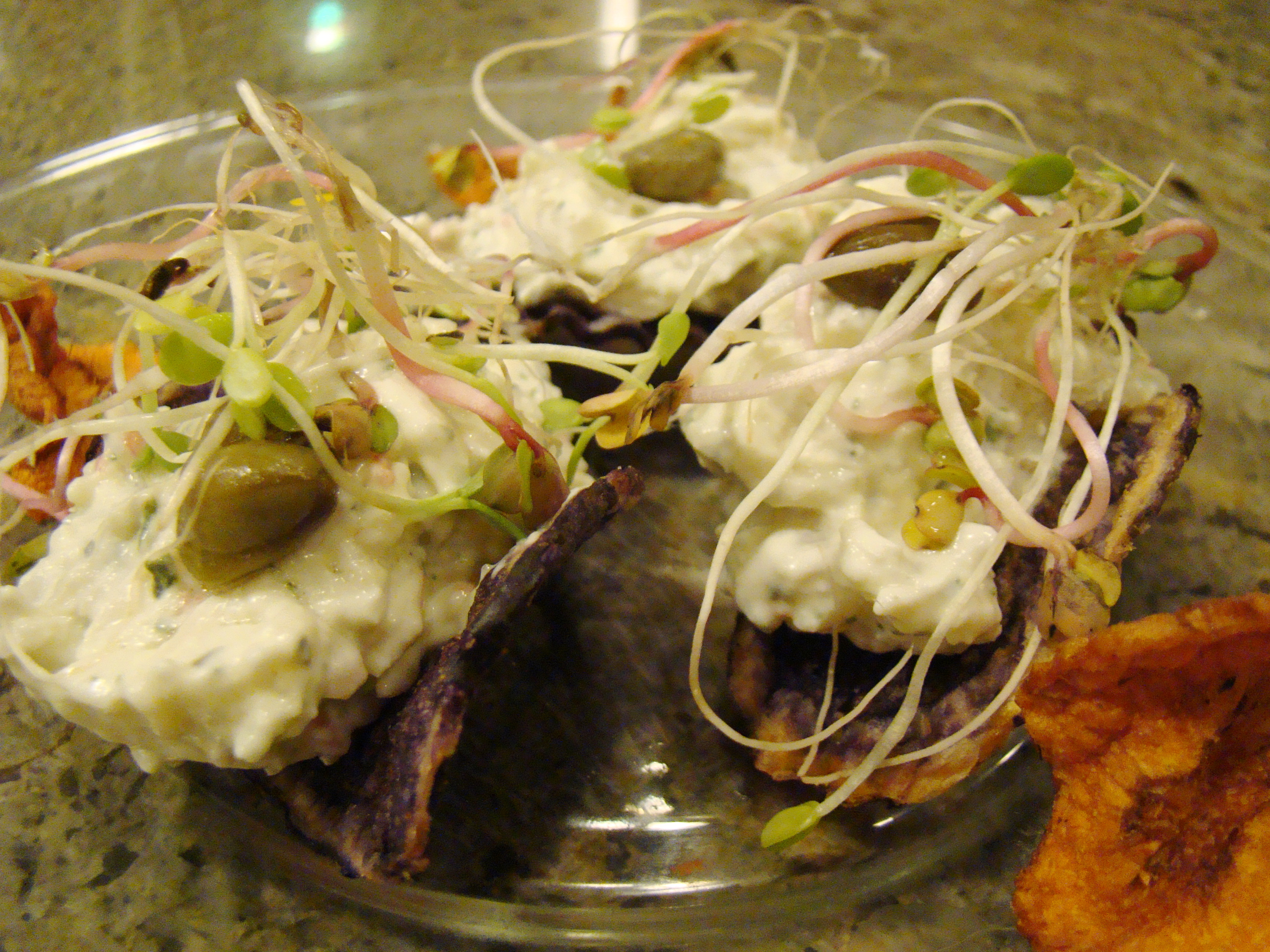
Crisps topped with artichoke dip and sprouts

== History ==
Spinach and artichoke dip became prominent in the 1950s, when eating in front of the television became more common. These became widespread, as they do not require any utensils. Consumer Packaged Goods companies like Lays, Hellman's and Lipton's helped push this trend.

== See also ==
- List of dips
- List of condiments
- Spinach dip
