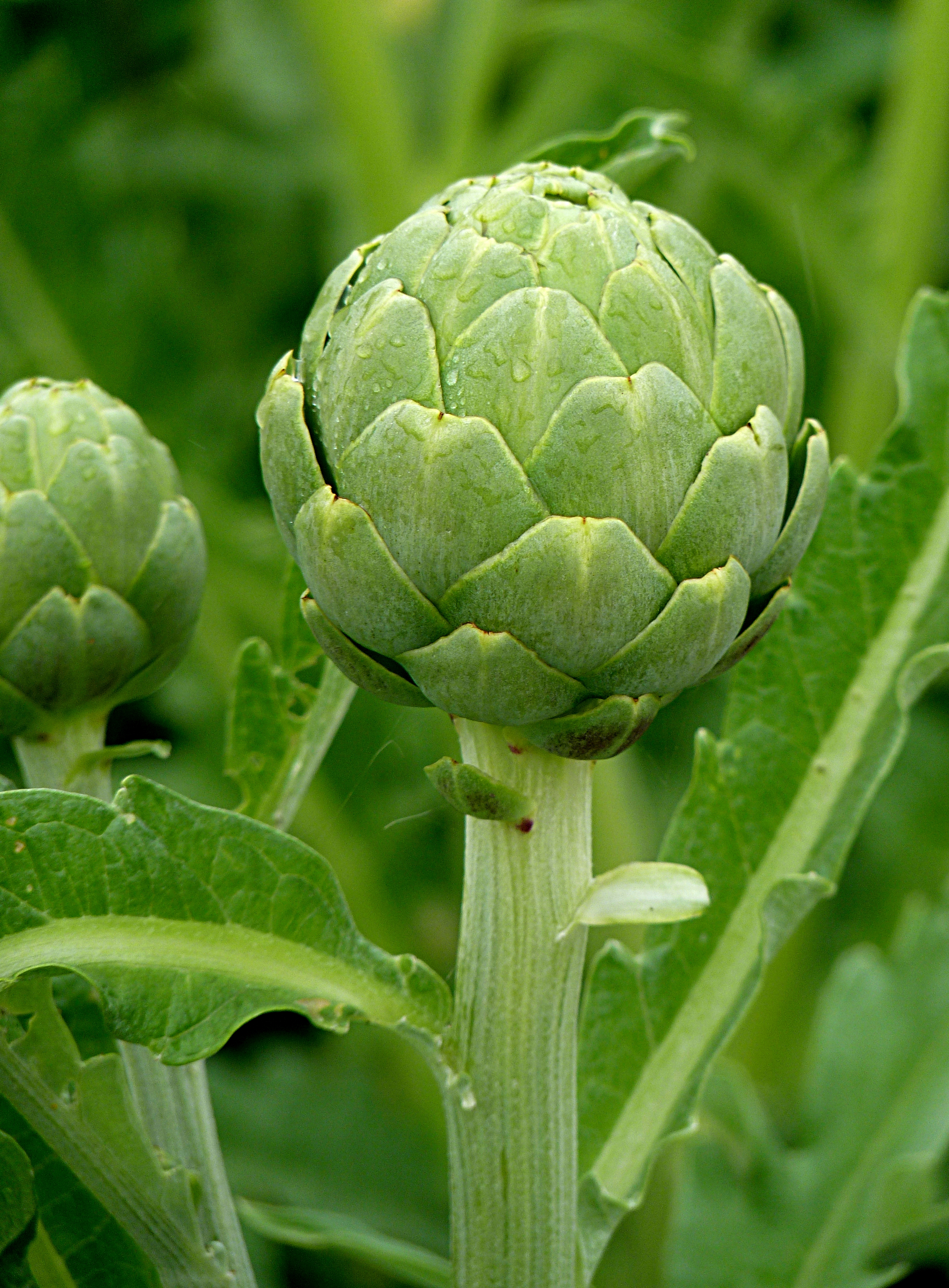

Scientific classification
- Kingdom: Plantae
- Clade: Tracheophytes
- Clade: Angiosperms
- Clade: Eudicots
- Clade: Asterids
- Order: Asterales
- Family: Asteraceae
- Genus: Cynara
- Species: C. cardunculus
- Variety: C. c. var. scolymus

Trinomial name
- Cynara cardunculus var. scolymus L.

= Artichoke =

Type of vegetable cultivated for culinary use

The artichoke (Cynara cardunculus var. scolymus) is a variety of a species of thistle cultivated as food.

The edible portion of the plant consists of the flower buds before the flowers come into bloom. The budding artichoke flower-head is a cluster of many budding small flowers (an inflorescence), together with many bracts, on an edible base. Once the buds bloom, the structure changes to a coarse, barely edible form. Another variety of the same species is the cardoon, a perennial plant native to the Mediterranean region. Both wild forms and cultivated varieties (cultivars) exist.

== Description ==
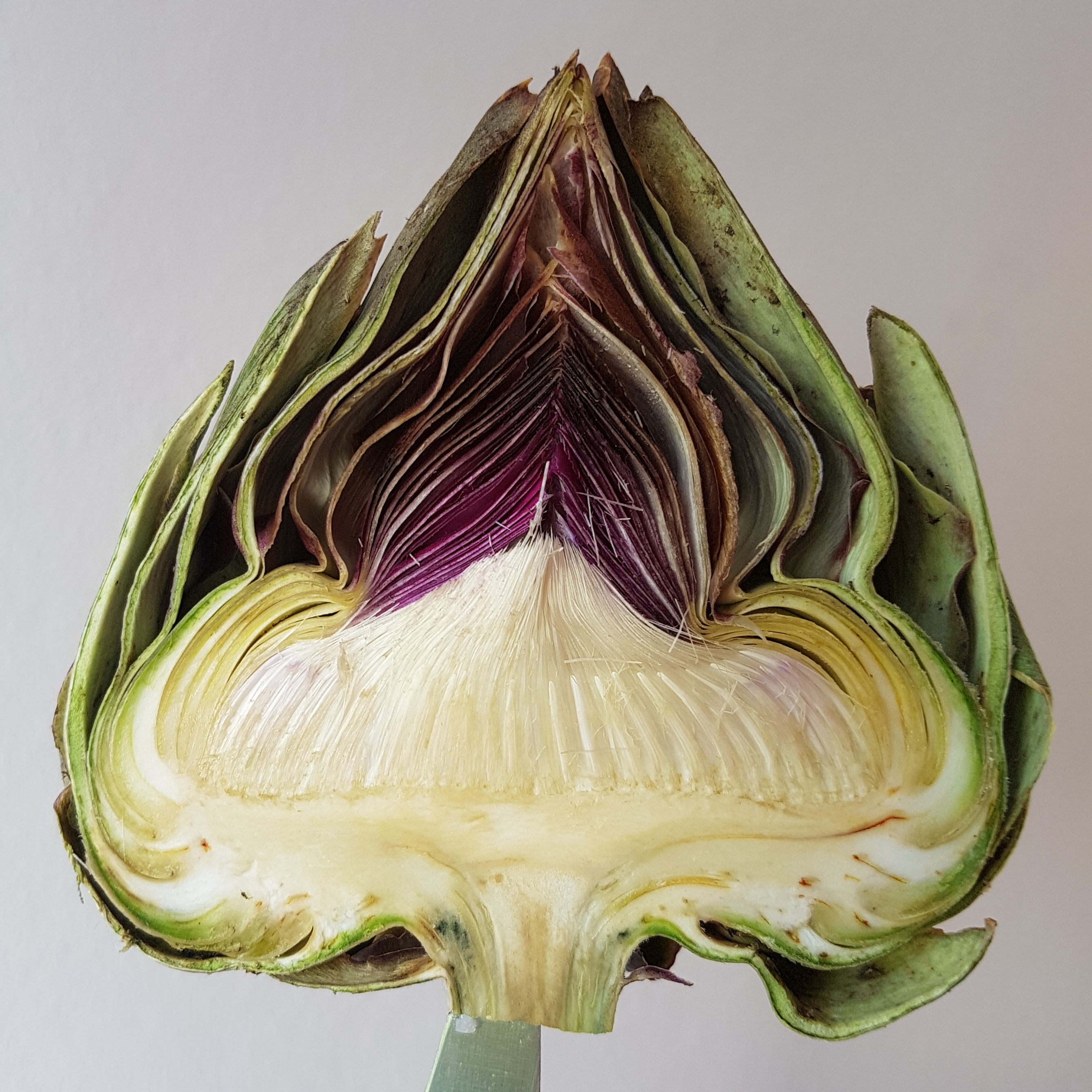
Cross section of an artichoke heart

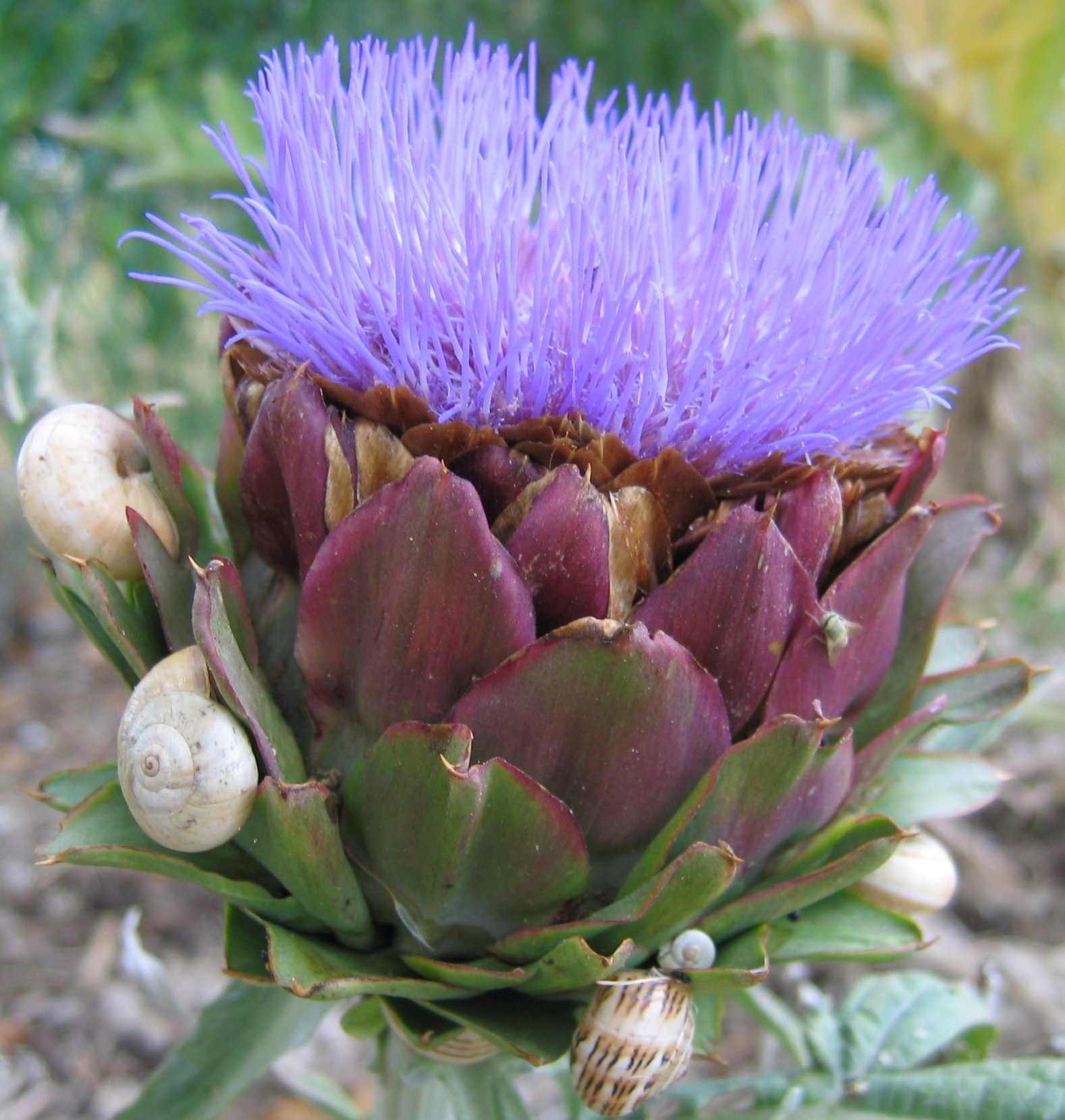
Artichoke head with flower in bloom

This vegetable grows to 1.4–2 m (4 ft 7 in – 6 ft 6 1/2 in) tall, with arching, deeply lobed, silvery, glaucous-green leaves 50–83 cm (19 1/2–32 1/2 in) long. The flowers develop in a large head from an edible bud about 8–15 cm (3–6 in) diameter with numerous triangular scales; the individual florets are purple. The edible portions of the buds consist primarily of the fleshy lower portions of the involucral bracts and the base, known as the heart; the mass of immature florets in the center of the bud is called the choke or beard (which is inedible in older, larger flowers), and the bottom of the heart from which all leaves and choke have been removed.

== Name ==
The English word artichoke was borrowed in the sixteenth century from the northern Italian word articiocco (the standard modern Italian being carciofo). The Italian term was itself borrowed either from Spanish alcarchofa (today usually alcachofa) or directly from the source of the Spanish word—medieval Andalusi Arabic الخرشوفة (al-kharshūfa, including the Arabic definite article al). The Arabic form kharshūfa is still used in Maghrebi Arabic today, while other variants in Arabic include kharshafa, and Modern Standard Arabic khurshūfa. These Arabic forms derive from classical Arabic حرشفة (harshafa) singular word of the plural حراشف (ḥarashef) meaning "scale". Other languages which derive their word for the artichoke from Arabic include Israeli Hebrew, which has the word חֻרְשָׁף (khursháf). The original Hebrew name (see Hebrew: he:ארטישוק) is קינרס kinars, which is found in the Mishna. During the sixteenth century the artichoke began to appear in French as carchofas, from the Italian carciofo.

Despite being borrowed from Arabic, European terms for the artichoke have in turn influenced Arabic in their own right. For example, the modern Levantine Arabic term for artichoke is أرضي شوكي (ʔarḍī shawkī). This literally means 'earthy thorny', and is an Arabicisation (through phono-semantic matching) of the English word artichoke or other European terms like it.

As in the case of Levantine Arabic ʔarḍī shawkī, names for the artichoke have frequently changed form due to folk etymology and phono-semantic matching. The Italian form articiocco seems to have been adapted to correspond to Italian arci- ('arch-, chief') and ciocco ('stump'). Forms of the French word artichaut (which also derives from Arabic, possibly via Spanish) have over the years included artichaud (corresponding to chaud, 'warm') and artihault (corresponding to haut, 'height'). Forms found in English have included hartichoak, corresponding to heart and choke, which were likely associated with the belief that the inedible centre of the vegetable could choke its eaters or that the plant can take over a garden, choking out other plants.

== Ecology ==
Artichokes are affected by fungal pathogens including Verticillium dahliae and Rhizoctonia solani.

Soil solarization has been successful in other crop-fungus pathosystems and is evaluated for suppression of V. dahliae and R. solani by Guerrero et al. 2019.

== Cultivation ==
=== Early history ===
The artichoke is a domesticated variety of the wild cardoon (Cynara cardunculus), which is native to the Mediterranean area. There was debate over whether the artichoke was a food among the ancient Greeks and Romans, or whether that cultivar was developed later, with Classical sources referring instead to the wild cardoon. The cardoon is mentioned as a garden plant in the eighth century BC by Homer and Hesiod. Pliny the Elder mentioned growing of 'carduus' in Carthage and Cordoba. In North Africa, where it is still found in the wild state, the seeds of artichokes, probably cultivated, were found during the excavation of Roman-period Mons Claudianus in Egypt.

Varieties of artichokes were cultivated in Sicily beginning in the classical period of the ancient Greeks; the Greeks calling them kaktos. In that period, the Greeks ate the leaves and flower heads, which cultivation had already improved from the wild form. The Romans called the vegetable carduus (hence the name cardoon). Further improvement in the cultivated form appears to have taken place in the medieval period in Muslim Spain and the Maghreb, although the evidence is inferential only. By the twelfth century, it was being mentioned in the compendious guide to farming composed by Ibn al-'Awwam in Seville (although it does not appear in earlier major Andalusian Arabic works on agriculture), and in Germany by Hildegard von Bingen.

Le Roy Ladurie, in his book Les paysans de Languedoc, has documented the spread of artichoke cultivation in Italy and southern France in the late fifteenth and early sixteenth centuries, when the artichoke appeared as a new arrival with a new name, carchofas, which may be taken to indicate an arrival of an improved cultivated variety:

The blossom of the thistle, improved by the Arabs, passed from Naples to Florence in 1466, carried by Philippo Strozzi. Towards 1480 it is noticed in Venice, as a curiosity. But very soon veers towards the northwest... Artichoke beds are mentioned in Avignon by the notaries from 1532 onward; from the principal towns they spread into the hinterlands... appearing as carchofas at Cavaillon in 1541, at Chateauneuf du Pape in 1553, at Orange in 1554. The local name remains carchofas, from the Italian carciofo... They are very small, the size of a hen's egg... and are still considered a luxury, a vaguely aphrodisiac tidbit that one preserved in sugar syrup.

The Dutch introduced artichokes to England, where they grew in the garden of Henry VIII at Newhall in 1530. From the mid-seventeenth century artichokes 'enjoyed a vogue' in European courts. The hearts were considered luxury ingredients in the new court cookery as recorded by writers such as François Pierre La Varenne, the author of Le Cuisinier François (1651). It was also claimed, in this period, that artichokes had aphrodisiac properties. They were taken to the United States in the nineteenth century—to Louisiana by French immigrants and to California by Spanish immigrants.

=== Cultivation methods ===
Artichokes may be produced from seeds or from vegetative means such as division, root cuttings, or micropropagation. Although technically perennials that normally produce the edible flower only during the second and subsequent years, certain varieties of artichokes may be grown from seed as annuals, producing a limited harvest at the end of the first growing season, even in regions where the plants are not normally winter-hardy. This means home gardeners in northern regions can attempt to produce a crop without the need to overwinter plants with special treatment or protection. The seed cultivar 'Imperial Star' has been bred to produce in the first year without such measures. An even newer cultivar, 'Northern Star', is said to be able to overwinter in more northerly climates and readily survives subzero temperatures.

Commercial culture is limited to warm areas of the mainland of the United States in USDA hardiness zone 7 and above. It requires good soil, regular watering and feeding, and frost protection in winter. Rooted suckers may be planted each year, so mature specimens may be disposed of after a few years, as each individual plant lives only a few years. The peak season for artichoke harvesting is the spring, but they can continue to be harvested throughout the summer, with another peak period in mid-autumn. When harvested, they are cut from the plant so as to leave an inch or two of stem (that also is edible and resembles the bottom). Artichokes possess good keeping qualities, frequently remaining quite fresh for two weeks or longer under average retail conditions.

Apart from culinary applications, the globe artichoke is used as a landscape plant for its bright floral display, sometimes grown in herbaceous borders for its bold foliage and large, purple flower heads.

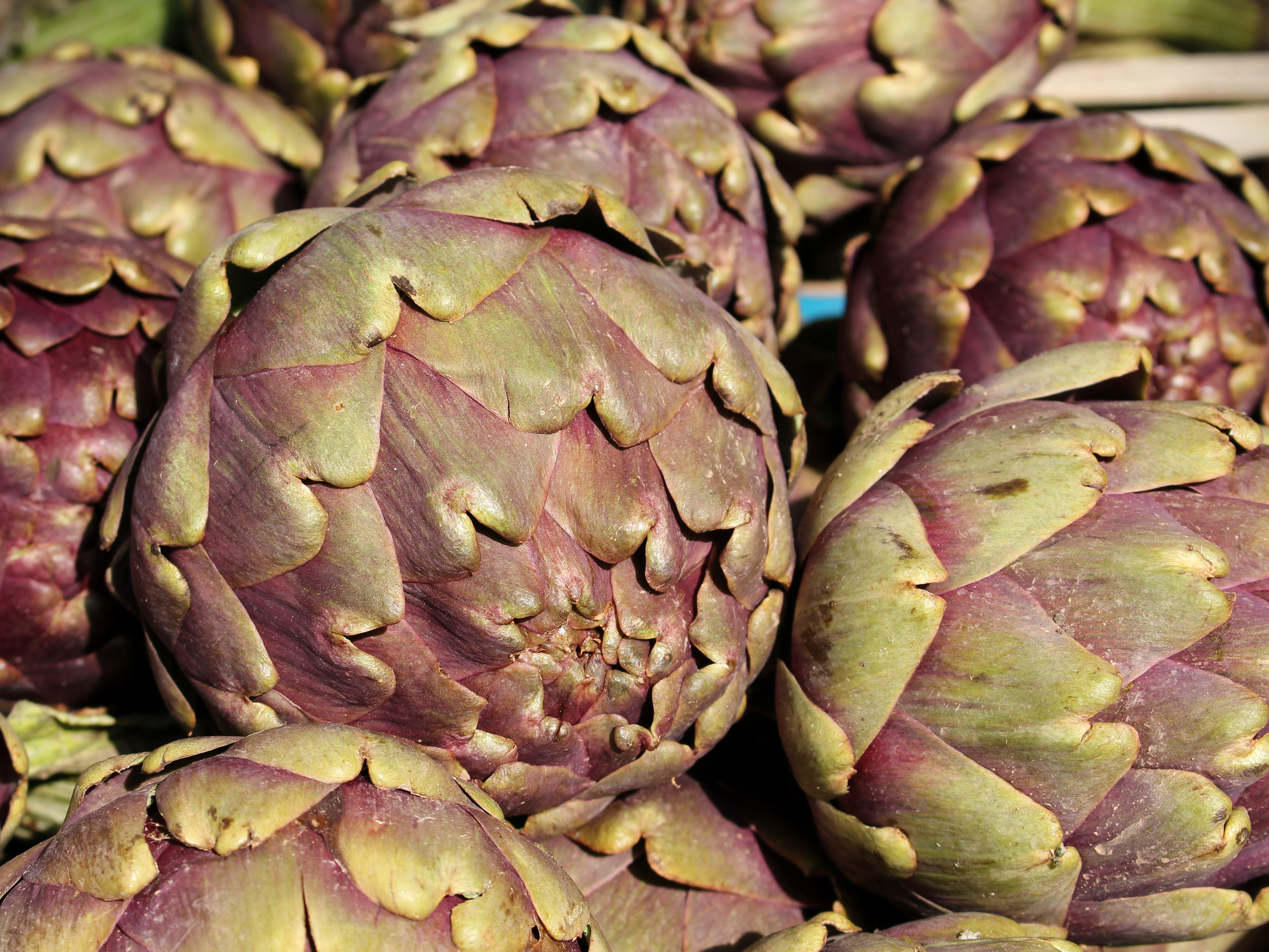
Some varieties of artichoke display purple coloration

=== Cultivars ===
- Green, big: 'Vert de Laon' (France), 'Camus de Bretagne', 'Castel' (France), 'Green Globe' (USA, South Africa)
- Green, medium-size: 'Verde Palermo' (Sicily, Italy), 'Blanca de Tudela' (Spain), 'Argentina', 'Española' (Chile), 'Blanc d'Oran' (Algeria), 'Sakiz', 'Bayrampasha' (Turkey)
- Purple, big: 'Romanesco', 'C3' (Lazio, Italy)
- Purple, medium-size: 'Violet de Provence' (France), 'Brindisino', 'Catanese', 'Niscemese' (Sicily, Italy), 'Violet d'Algerie' (Algeria), 'Baladi' (Egypt), 'Ñato' (Argentina), 'Violetta di Chioggia' (Veneto, Italy)
- Spined: 'Spinoso Sardo e Ingauno' (Sardinia, Italy), 'Criolla' (Peru)
- White: in some parts of the world.

== Production ==
In 2024, world production of artichokes was 1.7 million tonnes, led by Egypt with 601,272 tonnes and Italy with 373,960 tonnes.

Production of artichokes

Artichoke yield

== Uses ==
Artichoke, cooked boiled, unsalted
Nutritional value per 100 g (3.5 oz)
- Energy: 310 kJ (74 kcal)
- Carbohydrates: 11.57 g
- Sugars: 0.96 g
- Dietary fiber: 5.5 g
- Fat: 2.87 g
- Protein: 2.81 g
Vitamins and minerals
Vitamins	Quantity %DV^{†}
Vitamin A equiv. lutein zeaxanthin	449 μg
Thiamine (B1)	4% 0.05 mg
Riboflavin (B2)	7% 0.087 mg
Niacin (B3)	7% 1.075 mg
Vitamin B6	6% 0.095 mg
Folate (B9)	22% 86 μg
Vitamin C	8% 7.2 mg
Vitamin K	14% 16.7 μg
Minerals	Quantity %DV^{†}
Calcium	2% 21 mg
Copper	14% 0.123 mg
Iron	3% 0.59 mg
Magnesium	10% 41 mg
Phosphorus	6% 71 mg
Potassium	9% 277 mg
Selenium	0% 0.2 μg
Sodium	8% 180 mg
Zinc	4% 0.4 mg
- Other constituents: Quantity
- Water: 81.7 g
- Link to USDA Database entry
- ^{†}Percentages estimated using US recommendations for adults, except for potassium, which is estimated based on expert recommendation from the National Academies.

=== Nutrition ===
Cooked unsalted artichoke is 82% water, 12% carbohydrates, 3% protein, and 3% fat (table). In a 100-gram reference serving, cooked artichoke supplies 310 kilojoules (74 kilocalories) of food energy, is a rich source (20% or more of the Daily Value, DV) of folate, and is a moderate source (10–19% DV) of vitamin K, copper, and magnesium (10–14% DV) (table), manganese (18%), among others. Nutritional details also include many phytochemicals.

=== Culinary ===
Large globe artichokes are frequently prepared by removing all but 5–10 mm (3/16–3/8 in) or so of the stem. To remove thorns, which may interfere with eating, around a quarter of each scale may be cut off. To cook, the artichoke is simmered for 15 to 30 minutes, or steamed for 30–40 minutes (less for small ones). A cooked, unseasoned artichoke has a delicate flavor.

Salt may be added to the water if boiling artichokes. Covered artichokes, in particular those that have been cut, may turn brown due to the enzymatic browning and chlorophyll oxidation. Placing them in water slightly acidified with vinegar or lemon juice can prevent the discoloration.

Leaves are often removed one at a time, and the fleshy base eaten, often with vinaigrette, hollandaise, vinegar, butter, mayonnaise, aioli, lemon juice, or other sauces. The fibrous upper part of each leaf is usually discarded. The heart is eaten when the inedible choke has been peeled away from the base and discarded. Thin leaves covering the choke are also edible. The heart may be completely stripped of leaves and choke and eaten as a delicacy, stuffed with several types of ingredients, or chopped to include in dishes.

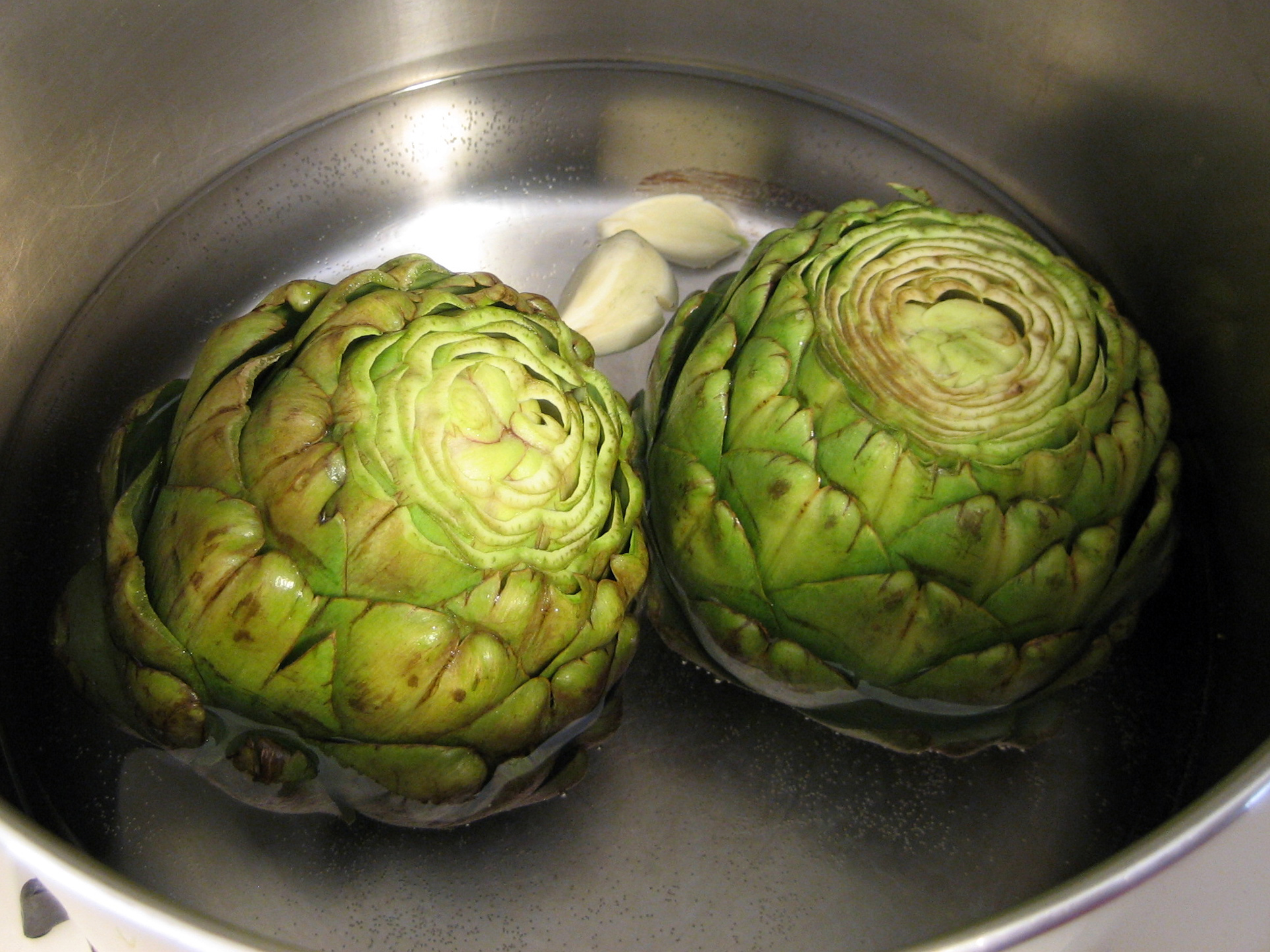
Globe artichokes being cooked

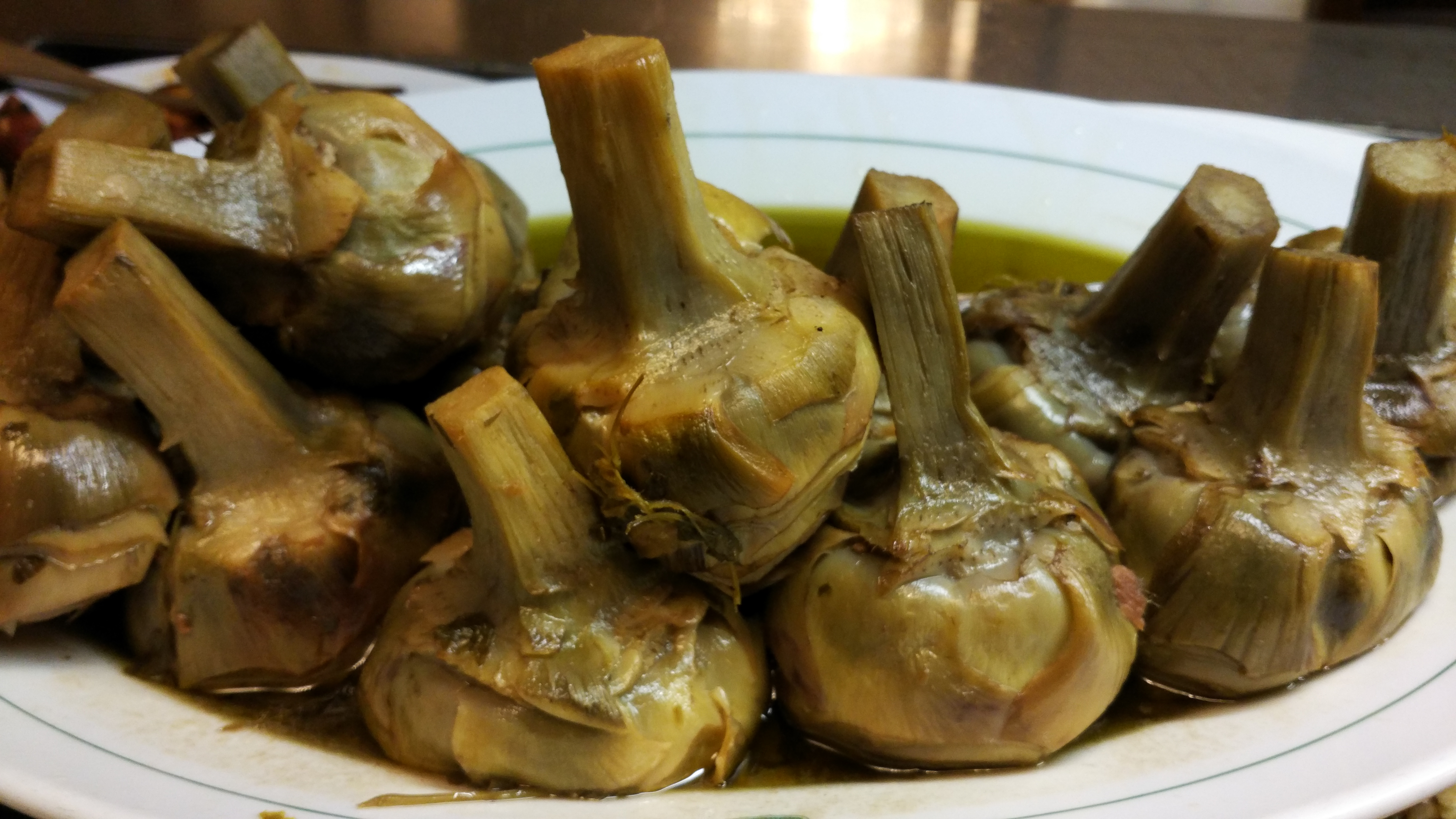
Artichokes alla romana

In Italy, artichoke hearts in oil are the usual vegetable for the "spring" section of the "four seasons" pizza (alongside tomatoes and basil for summer, mushrooms for autumn, and prosciutto and olives for winter).

A recipe well known in Rome is Jewish-style artichokes, which are deep-fried whole. The softer parts of artichokes are also eaten raw, one leaf at a time dipped in vinegar and olive oil, or thinly sliced and dressed with lemon and olive oil.

There are many stuffed artichoke recipes. A common Italian stuffing uses a mixture of bread crumbs, garlic, oregano, parsley, grated cheese, prosciutto, and sausage. A bit of the mixture is then pushed into the spaces at the base of each leaf and into the center before boiling or steaming.

In Spain, younger, smaller, and more tender artichokes are used. They can be sprinkled with olive oil and left in hot ashes in a barbecue, sautéed in olive oil with garlic, with rice as a paella, or sautéed and combined with eggs in a tortilla (frittata).

The Greek anginares alla Polita ("artichokes city-style", referring to the city of Constantinople) is a hearty, savory stew made with artichoke hearts, potatoes, and carrots, and is flavored with onion, lemon, and dill. The island of Tinos, or the villages of Iria and Kantia in the Peloponnese, still very much celebrate their local production, including with a day of the artichoke or an artichoke festival.

Artichokes may also be prepared by completely breaking off all of the leaves, leaving the bare heart. The leaves then are steamed to soften the fleshy base part of each leaf to be used as the basis for any number of side dishes or appetizing dips, or the fleshy part is left attached to the heart, while the upper parts of the leaves are discarded. The remaining concave-shaped heart is often filled with meat, then fried or baked in a savory sauce. Canned or frozen artichoke hearts are a time-saving substitute, although the consistency and stronger flavor of fresh hearts, when available, is often preferred. Deep-fried artichoke hearts are eaten in coastal areas of California. Canned artichoke bottoms with absolutely no leaves are sold as a delicacy.

Throughout North Africa, the Middle East, Turkey, and Armenia, ground lamb is a favorite filling for stuffed artichoke hearts or bottoms. Spices reflect the local cuisine of each country. In Lebanon, for example, the typical filling would include lamb, onion, tomato, pinenuts, raisins, parsley, dill, mint, black pepper, and allspice. A popular Turkish vegetarian variety uses only onion, carrot, green peas, and salt. Artichokes are often prepared with white sauces or other kinds of sauces.

==== Herbal tea ====
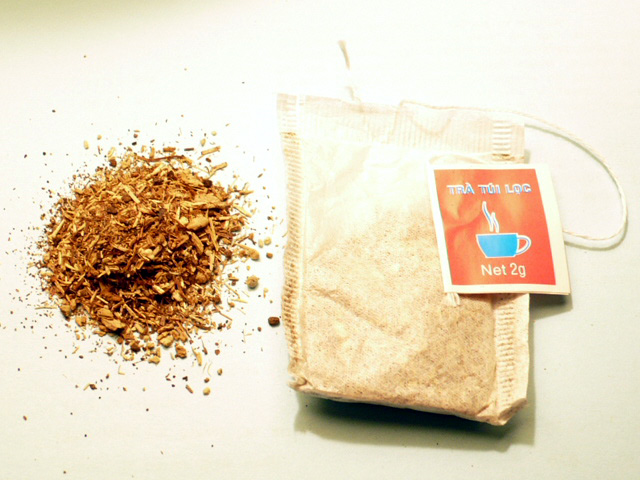
A tea bag containing artichoke tea from Vietnam

Artichokes also may be made into a herbal tea. The infusion is consumed particularly among the Vietnamese. An artichoke-based herbal tea called Ceai de Anghinare is made in Romania. The flower portion is put into water and consumed as a herbal tea in Mexico. It has a slightly bitter, woody taste.

==== Apéritif ====
Artichoke is the primary botanical ingredient of the Italian aperitif Cynar, with 16.5% alcohol by volume, produced by the Campari Group. It may be served over ice as an aperitif or as a cocktail mixed with orange juice, which is especially popular in Switzerland. It is also used to make a 'Cin Cyn', a slightly less-bitter version of the Negroni cocktail, by substituting Cynar for Campari.

== Genome ==
The globe artichoke genome has been sequenced. The genome assembly covers 725 of the 1,084 Mb genome and the sequence codes for approximately 27,000 genes. An understanding of the genome structure is an important step in understanding traits of the globe artichoke, which may aid in the identification of economically important genes from related species.

== See also ==
- Brussels sprout
- Cardoon
