= Drawn butter =

Melted butter as a sauce

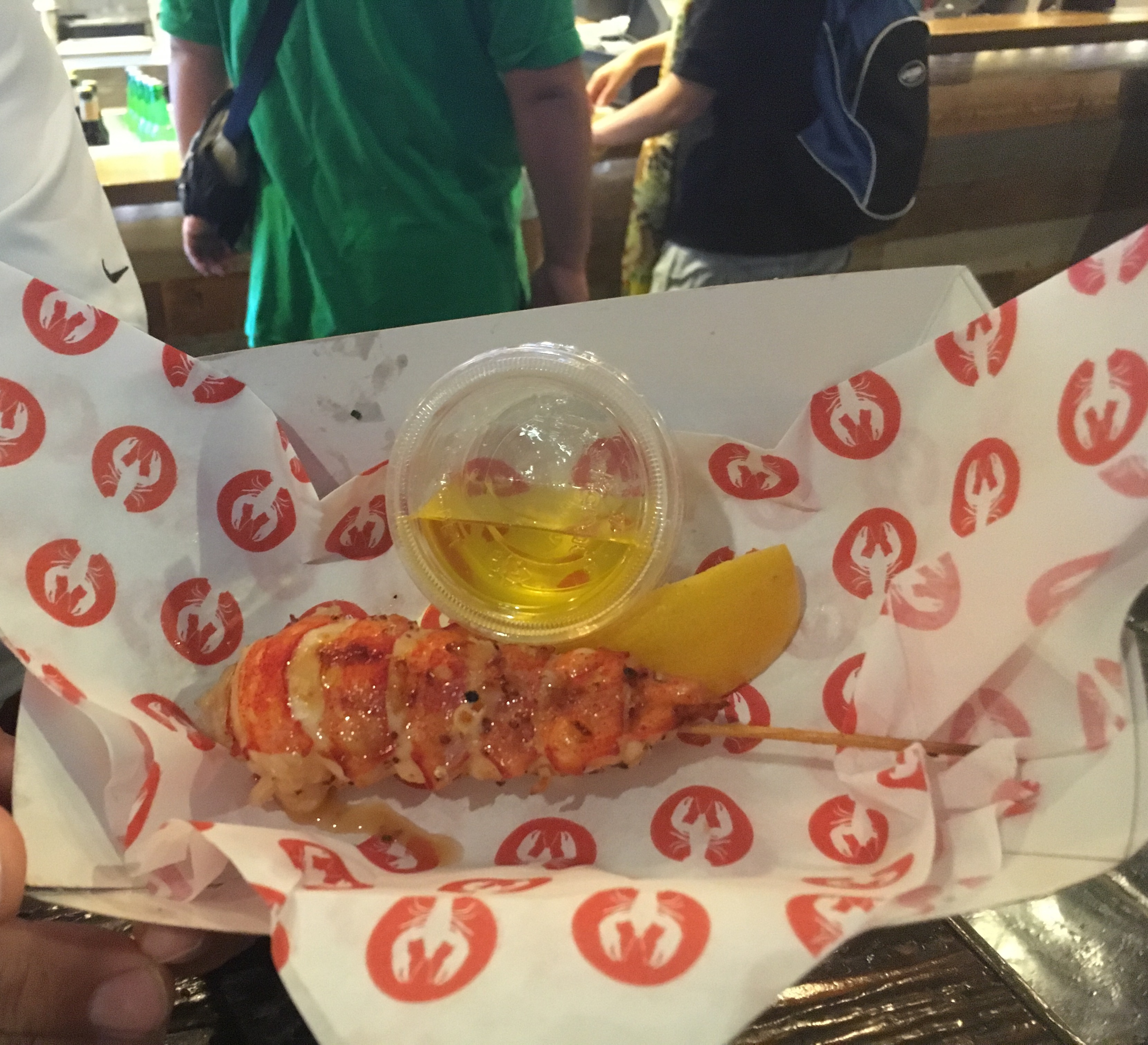
A piece of lobster with drawn butter in a plastic container

Drawn butter is melted butter, often served as a sauce for steamed seafood. Some cooks restrict the term to clarified butter, while others insist that it should not be clarified.

When it is served with seafood, diners often add lemon juice to it.

== Drawn butter sauces ==
In the 18th century, a small amount of flour and water or milk was often added to melted butter to thicken it and prevent it from separating. Later in the 19th century, increasing amounts of flour and water were used. These sauces may themselves be named simply "melted butter", "drawn butter", or "drawn butter sauce", and flavored with vinegar, salt, pepper, capers, watercress, and so on.

== See also ==
- Beurre blanc, a French sauce made of emulsified butter, also commonly served to accompany seafood
