= Kripik =

Indonesian chips

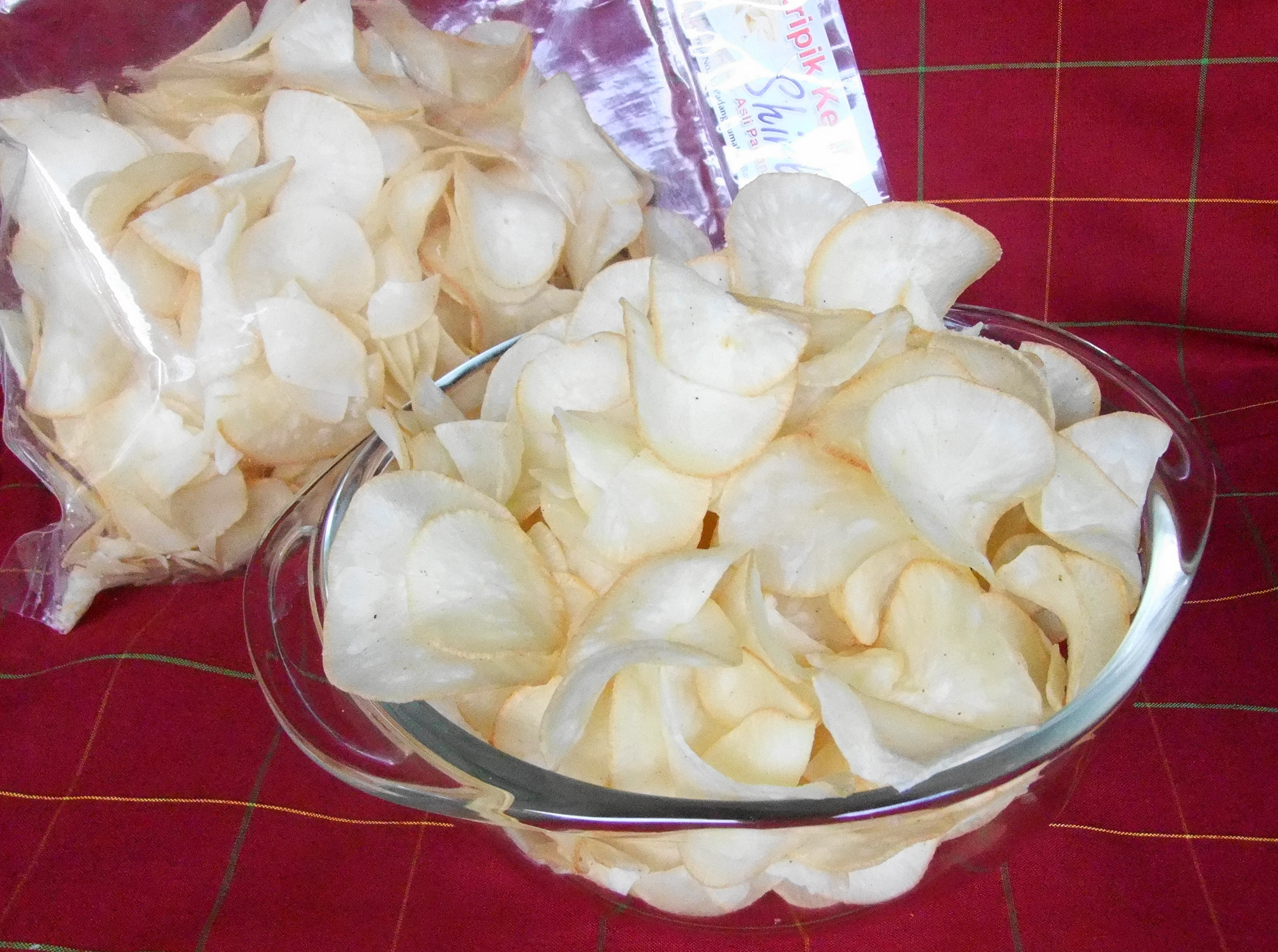
- Kripik singkong (cassava kripik)
- Alternative names: Keripik
- Course: Snack
- Place of origin: Indonesia
- Region or state: Nationwide
- Serving temperature: Room temperature
- Main ingredients: Deep-fried dried ingredients
- Variations: Different variations according to ingredients

Kripik or keripik are Indonesian chips or crisps, bite-size snack crackers that can be savoury or sweet. They are made from various dried fruits, tubers, vegetables, and fish that have undergone a deep frying process in hot vegetable oil. They can be lightly seasoned with salt, or spiced with chili powder and sugar.

Together with krupuk, the etymology of the term kripik is believed to be an onomatopoeia in Indonesian from the crunch sound of this crispy snack.

Kripik (chips) and krupuk (crackers) are an integral part of Indonesian cuisine. Kripik commonly are made from dried slices of roots and tubers. The most popular are kripik singkong (cassava crackers) and kripik pisang (Banana chips); other types of fruit, yam, or tuber crackers are also available.

== Kripik and krupuk ==
Kripik is closely related to krupuk since it is popularly considered a smaller-sized krupuk. In Indonesia, the term krupuk refers to relatively large crackers, while kripik or keripik refers to smaller bite-size crackers, the counterpart of chips (or crisps) in Western cuisine. For example, potato chips are called kripik kentang in Indonesia. Usually, krupuk are made from a dried paste consisting of a mixture of starch and other ingredients, while kripik are usually made entirely from a thinly sliced, sun-dried, and then deep-fried product without any mixture of starch.

== Variants ==
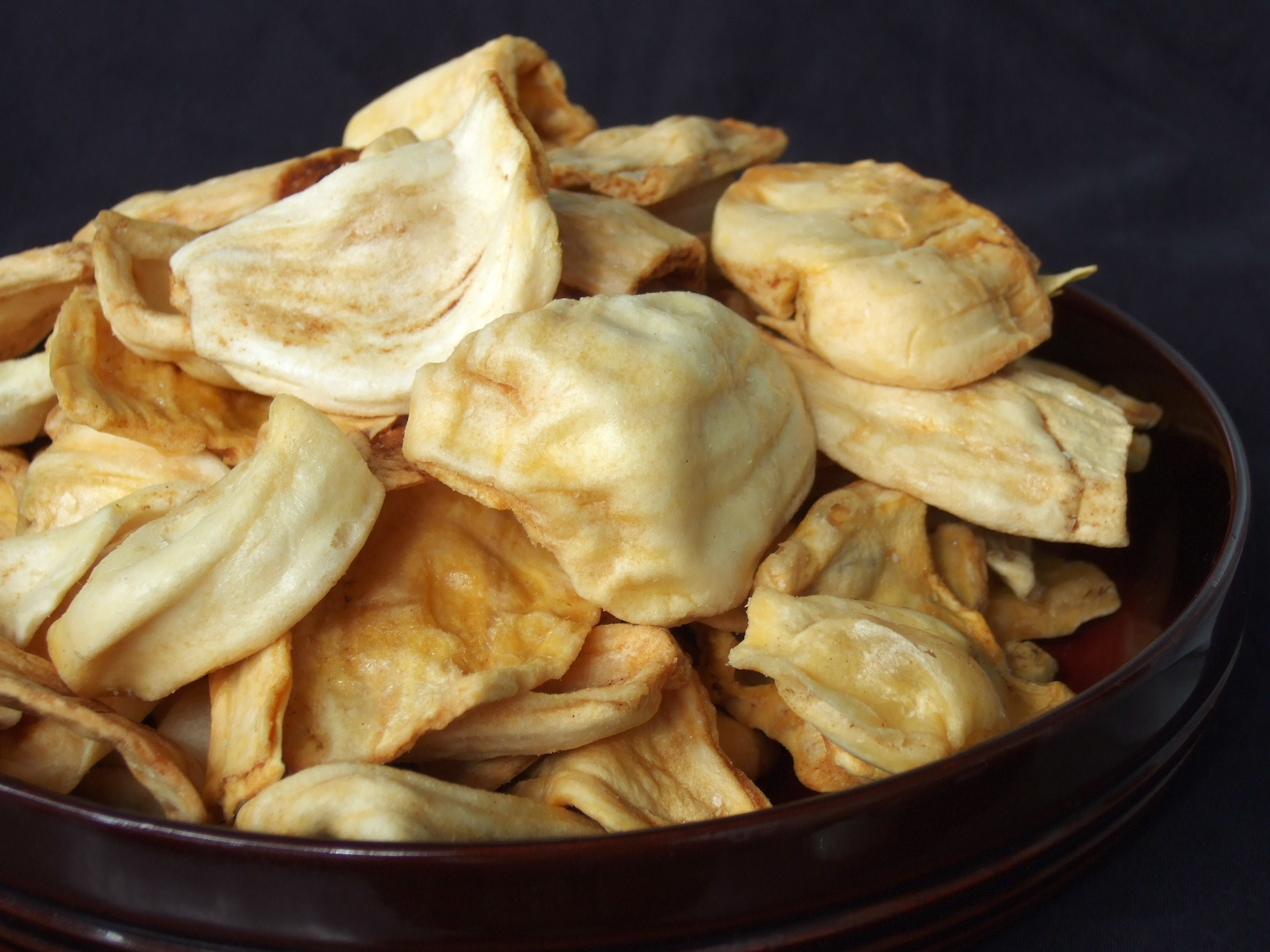
Jackfruit kripik

Almost all types of fruits, nuts, tubers, and plant products can be made into kripik. Other types of kripik can be coated with batter and deep-fried until crispy and dry. In Indonesia, the latest popular snack is extra hot and spicy kripik.

- Emping is a type of kripik made from the melinjo (Gnetum gnemon) nut.
- Kripik apel, made from dried apple, was originally produced in Malang, East Java
- Kripik bayam, made from spinach
- Kripik belut, made from battered and deep-fried eel
- Kripik cabe, made from chili
- Kripik ceker, made from deep-fried boneless chicken feet
- Kripik durian, from Medan
- Kripik gadung, made from gadung yam (Dioscorea hispida)
- Kripik ikan, made from fish
- Kripik jahe, made from ginger
- Kripik jamur, made from mushrooms
- Kripik kentang, made from potatoes
- Kripik nangka, made from jackfruit
- Kripik oncom, made from oncom, is similar to kripik tempeh but has a slightly bitter taste
- Kripik pisang, made from dried banana
- Kripik rambutan, made from rambutan
- Kripik salak, made from snake fruit
- Kripik sambal teri, spicy cassava chips with dried anchovies from Sibolga, North Sumatra.
- Kripik sanjay or kripik singkong balado, thin crispy cassava coated with chili pepper and sugar – a popular snack from Bukittinggi, West Sumatra
- Kripik singkong, made of cassava. A spicy variant is available in Bandung, West Java, commonly called by its brand name maicih.
- Kripik sukun, made from breadfruit
- Kripik talas/keladi, made from taro
- Kripik tempe, made by deep-frying batter-coated tempeh
- Kripik teripang, made from dried sea cucumbers
- Kripik ubi, made from sweet potatoes
- Kripik walang or kripik belalang, made from grasshoppers

== Product ==
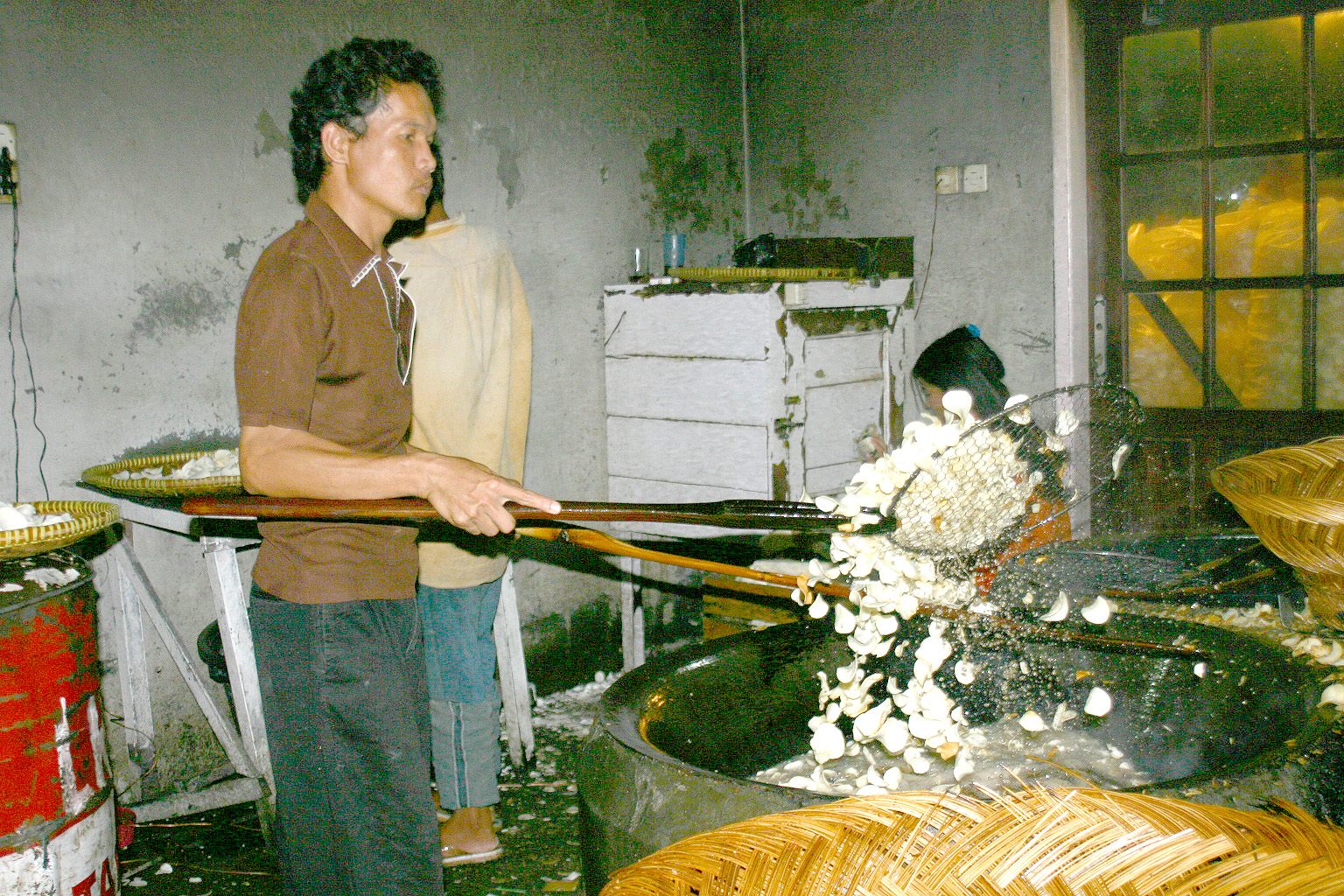
Kripik sanjay home industry in West Sumatra

Kripik are traditionally made by a small-scale home industry. However, just like the potato chip industry in the Western counterpart, in Indonesia today it is common to encounter mass-produced packed kripik snacks in warung shops, minimarkets, and supermarkets. Some brands have mass-produced certain variants of kripik chips.

In Indonesia, kripiks are often sold as oleh-oleh or food gifts to be brought home after travel. Certain areas have developed their specialty kripiks which depend on locally available ingredients and recipes. For example, Lampung is well known for its banana kripiks, Malang in East Java for its fruit-based kripiks, including apple and jackfruit kripiks, while Bandung is well known for its tempeh, oncom, tubers and sweet potato-based kripiks. Bukittinggi city in West Sumatra on the other hand is famous for its Keripik sanjay, a hot and spicy cassava chips coated with balado chili sauce.

As of 8 February 2018, the latest trend in Indonesia's kripik industry is extra hot kripiks with ample chili powder, which started with Keripik Pedas Maicih (Maicih spicy crackers) in Bandung in 2010. It is a bag of fiery hot cassava chips offered in different levels of spiciness. Subsequently, the popularity of extra hot kripik ' swept across the nation.

== Gallery ==
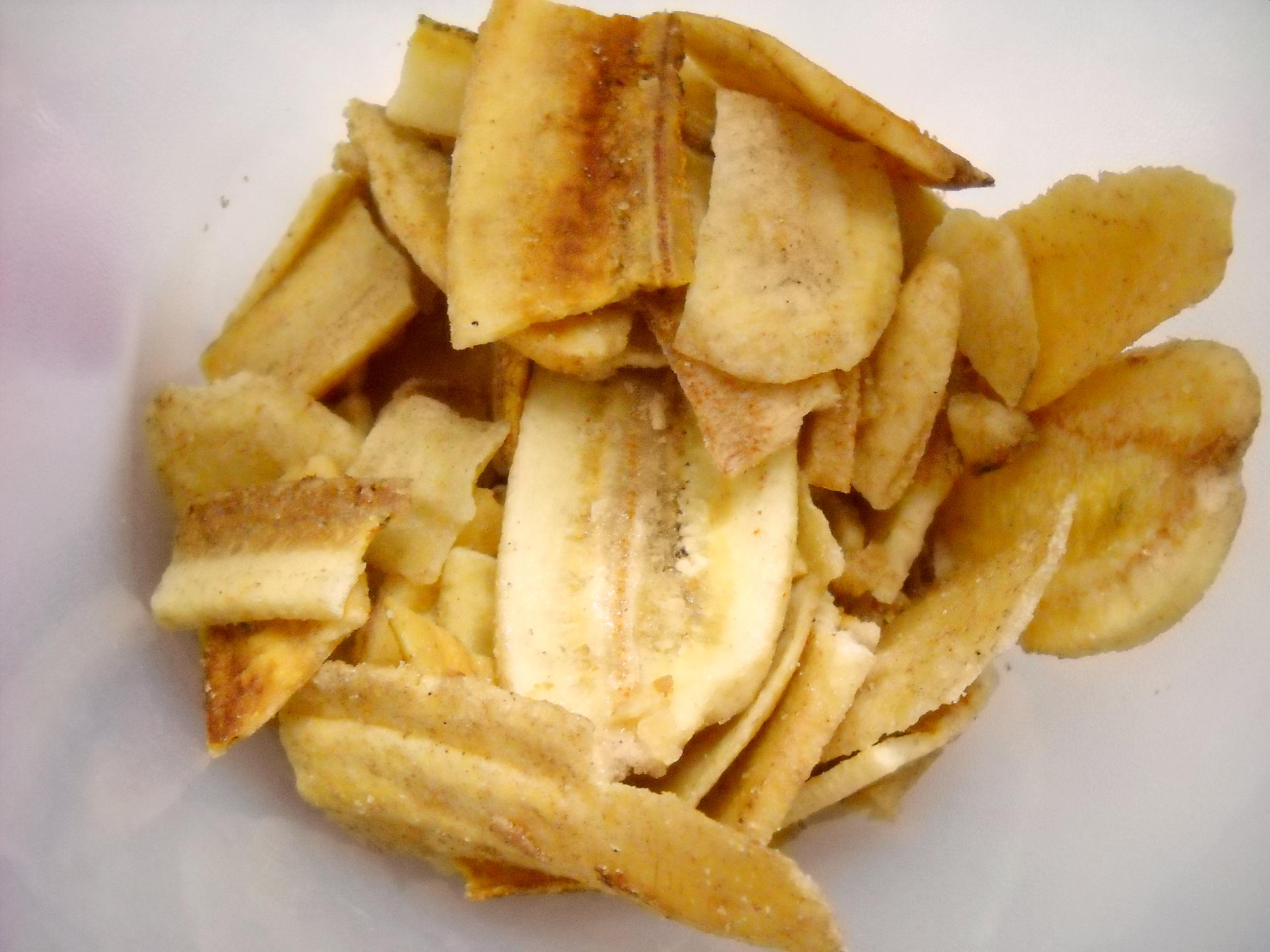
Banana kripik

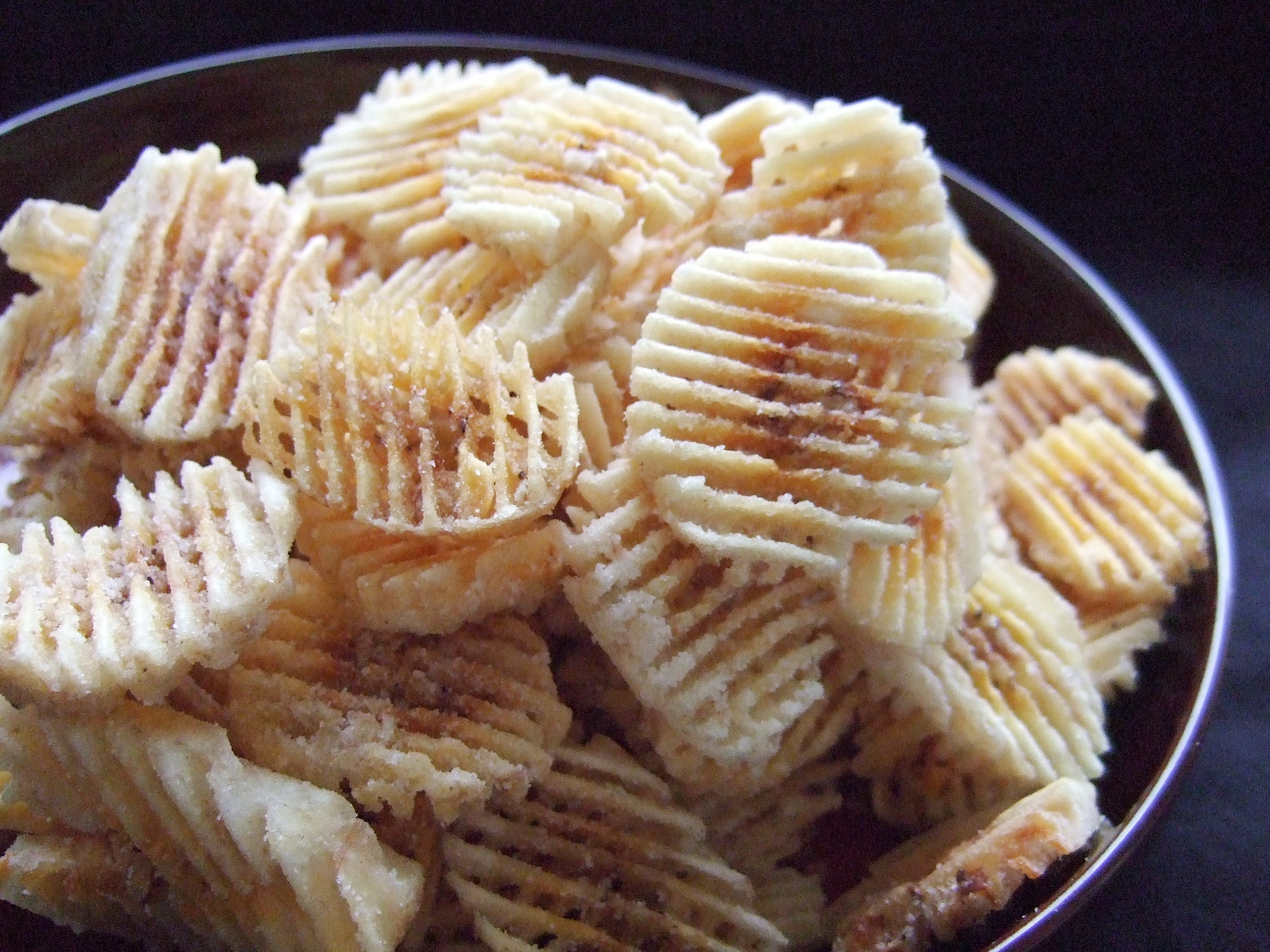
Kepok banana kripik

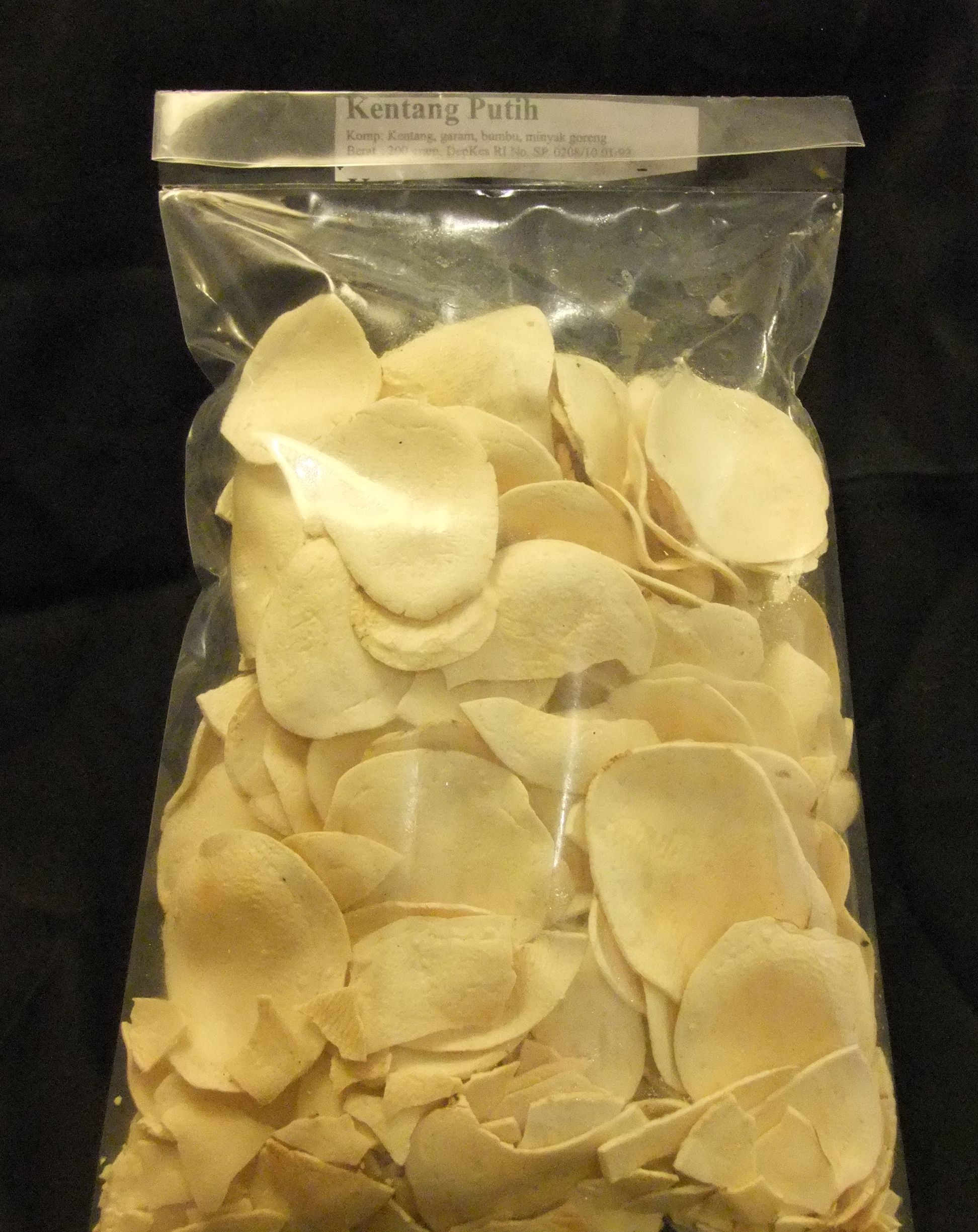
Gadung (Dioscorea hispida) kripik

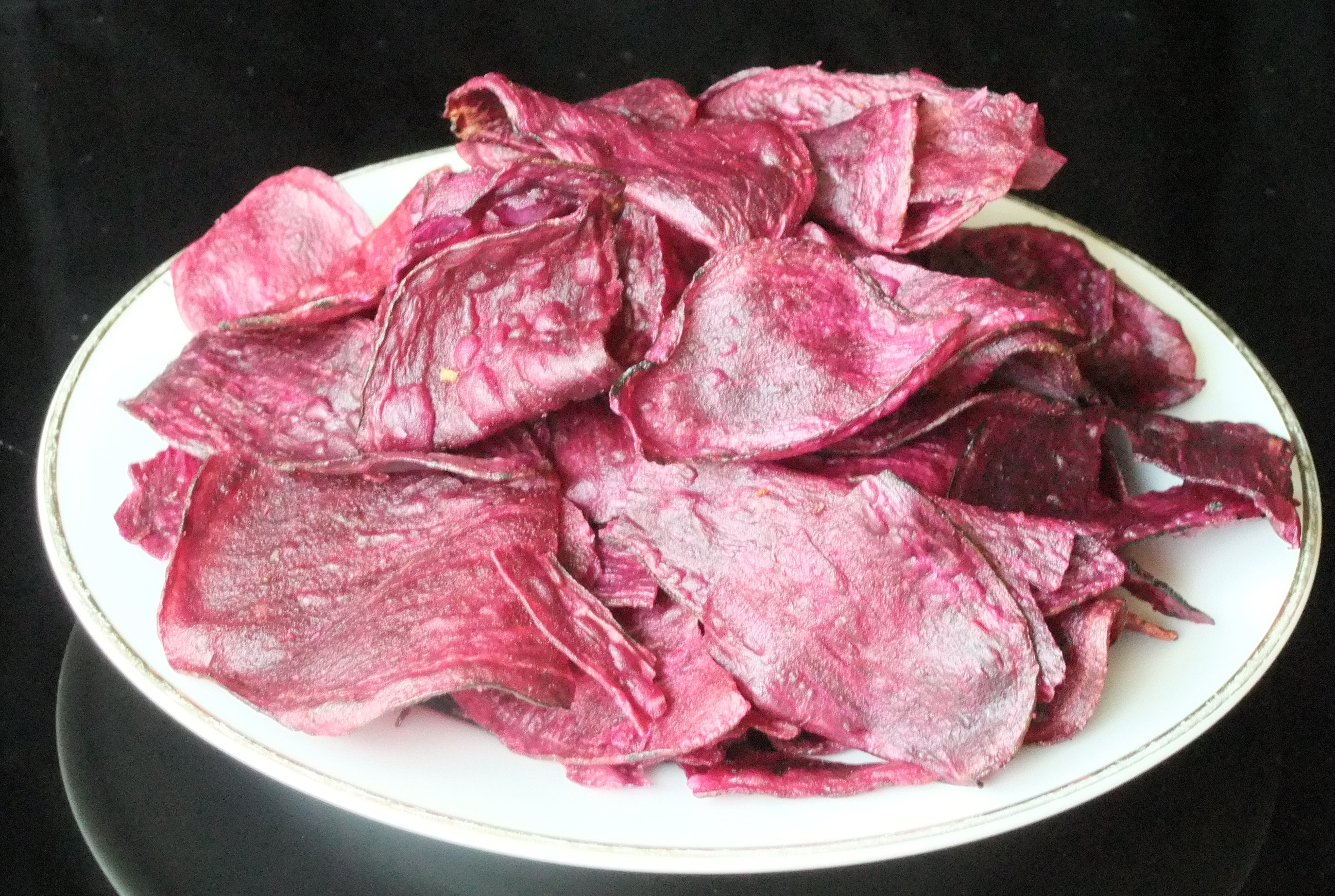
Sweet potato kripik

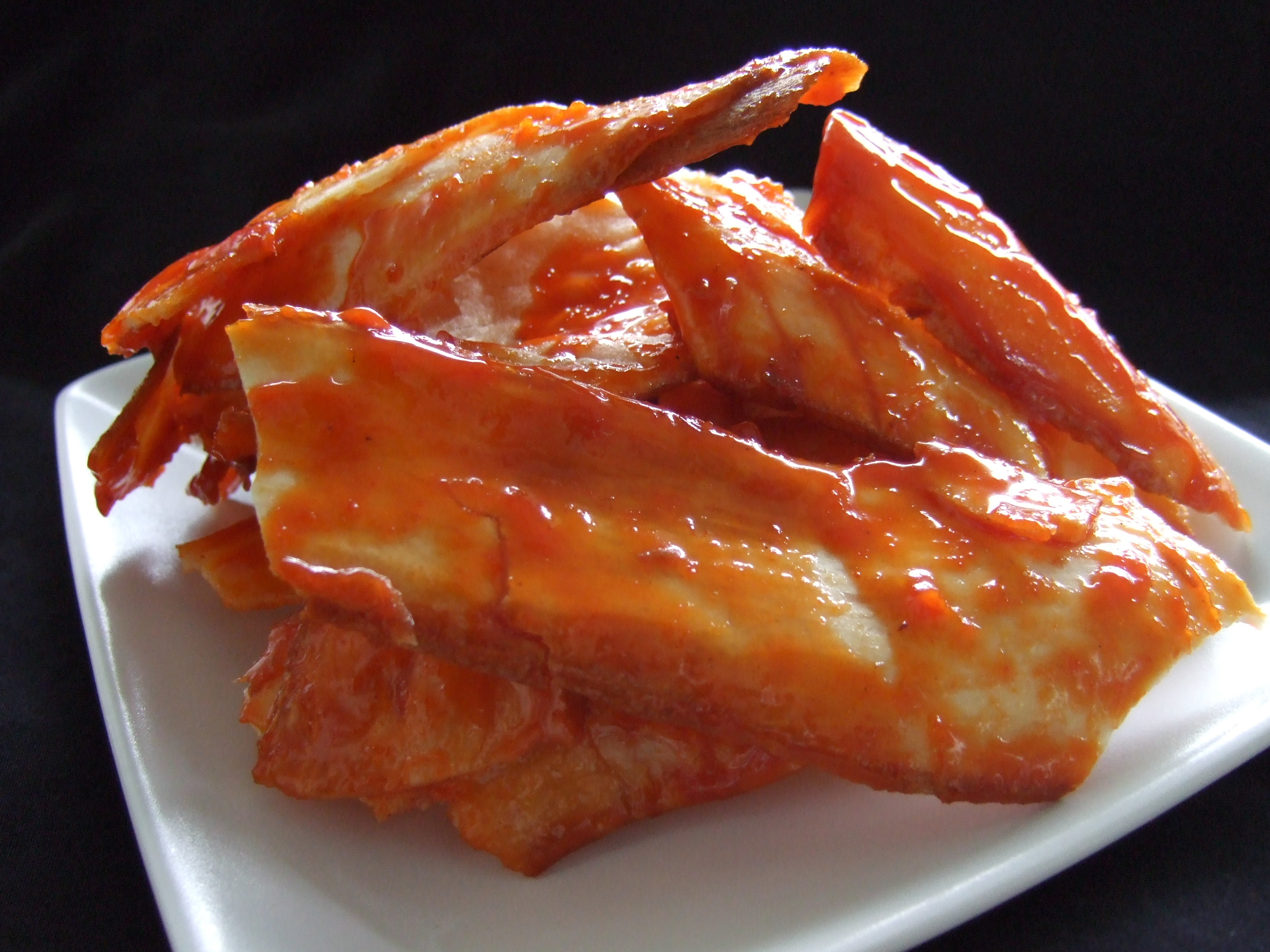
Kripik sanjai, cassava-chili kripik

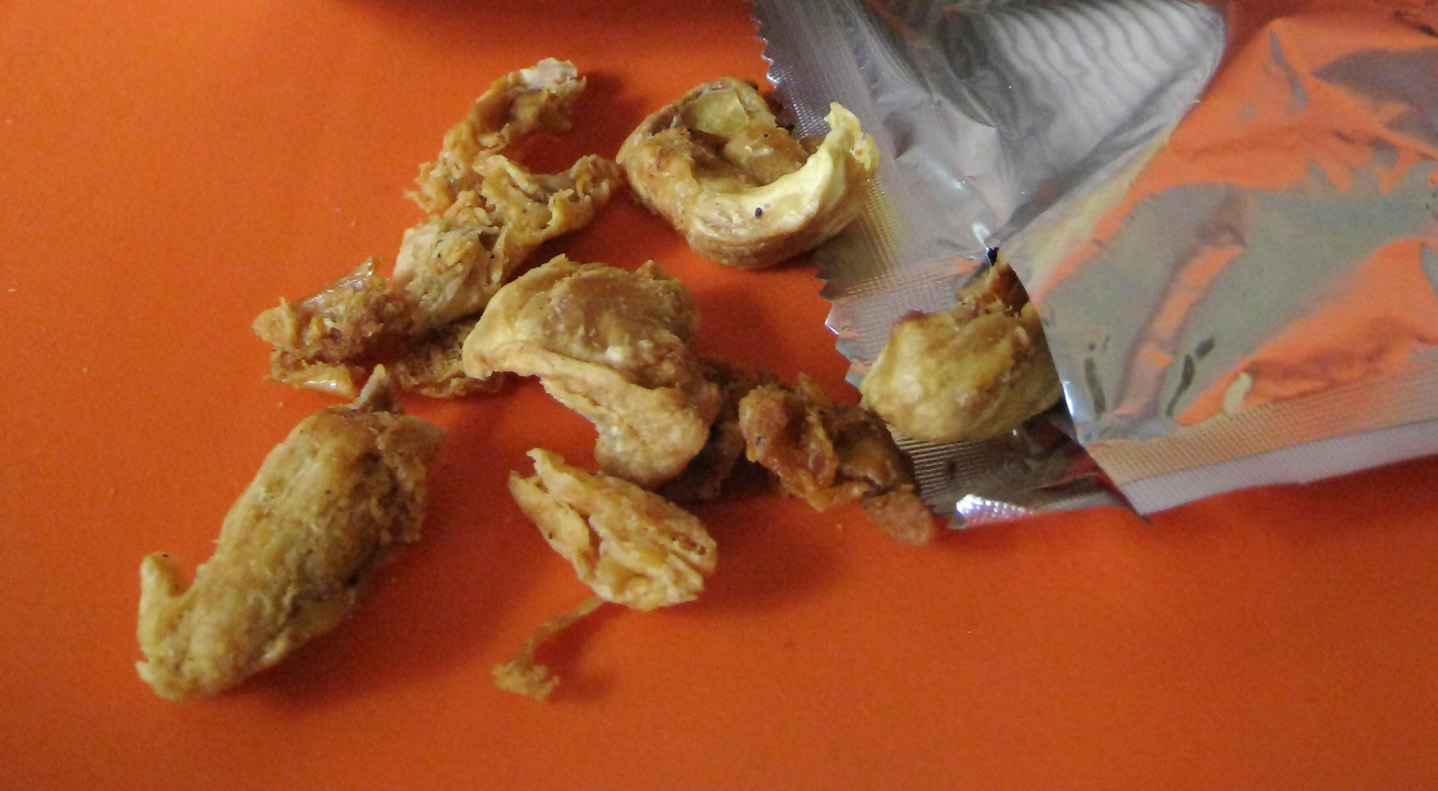
Durian kripik

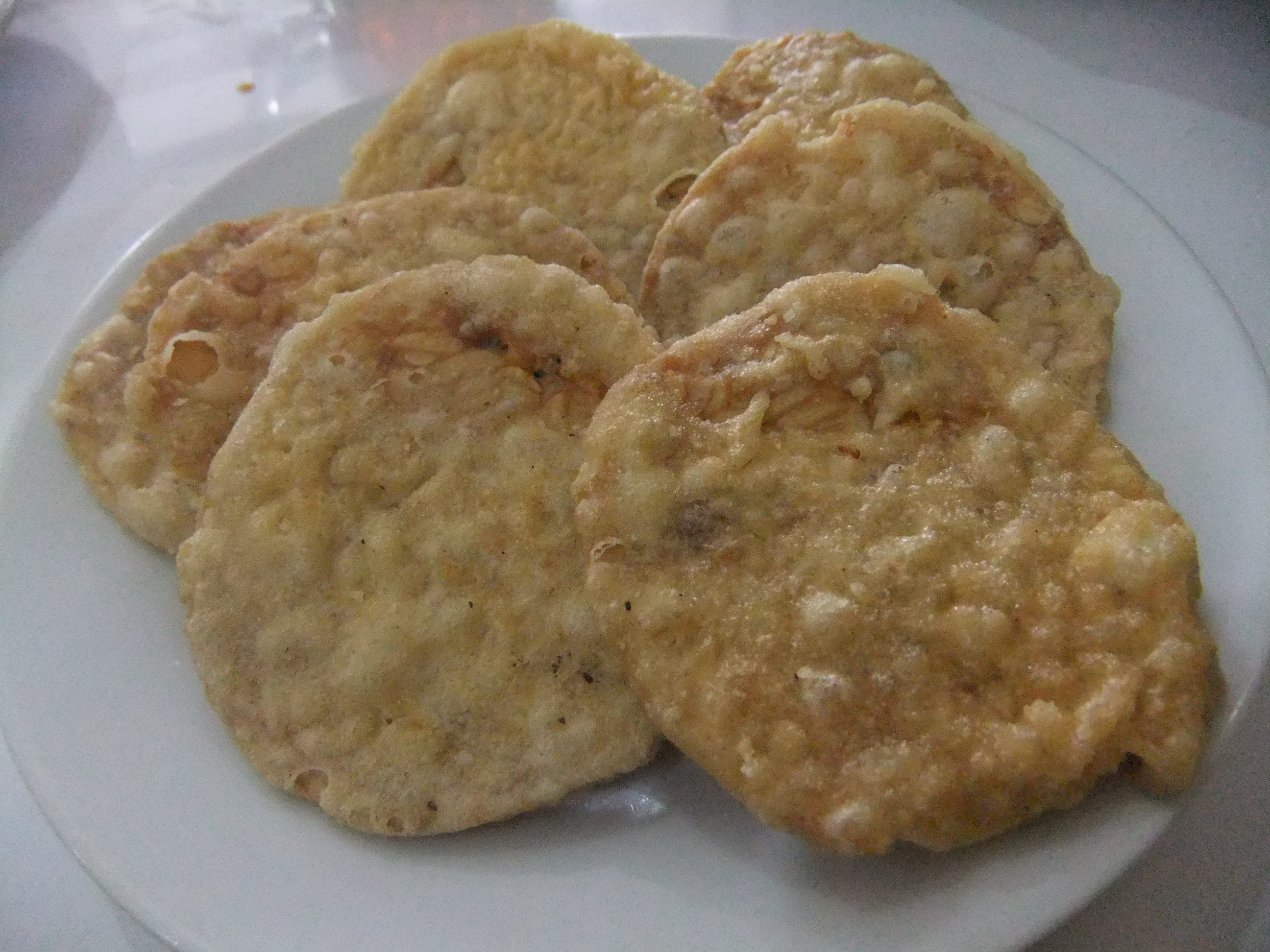
Tempeh kripik

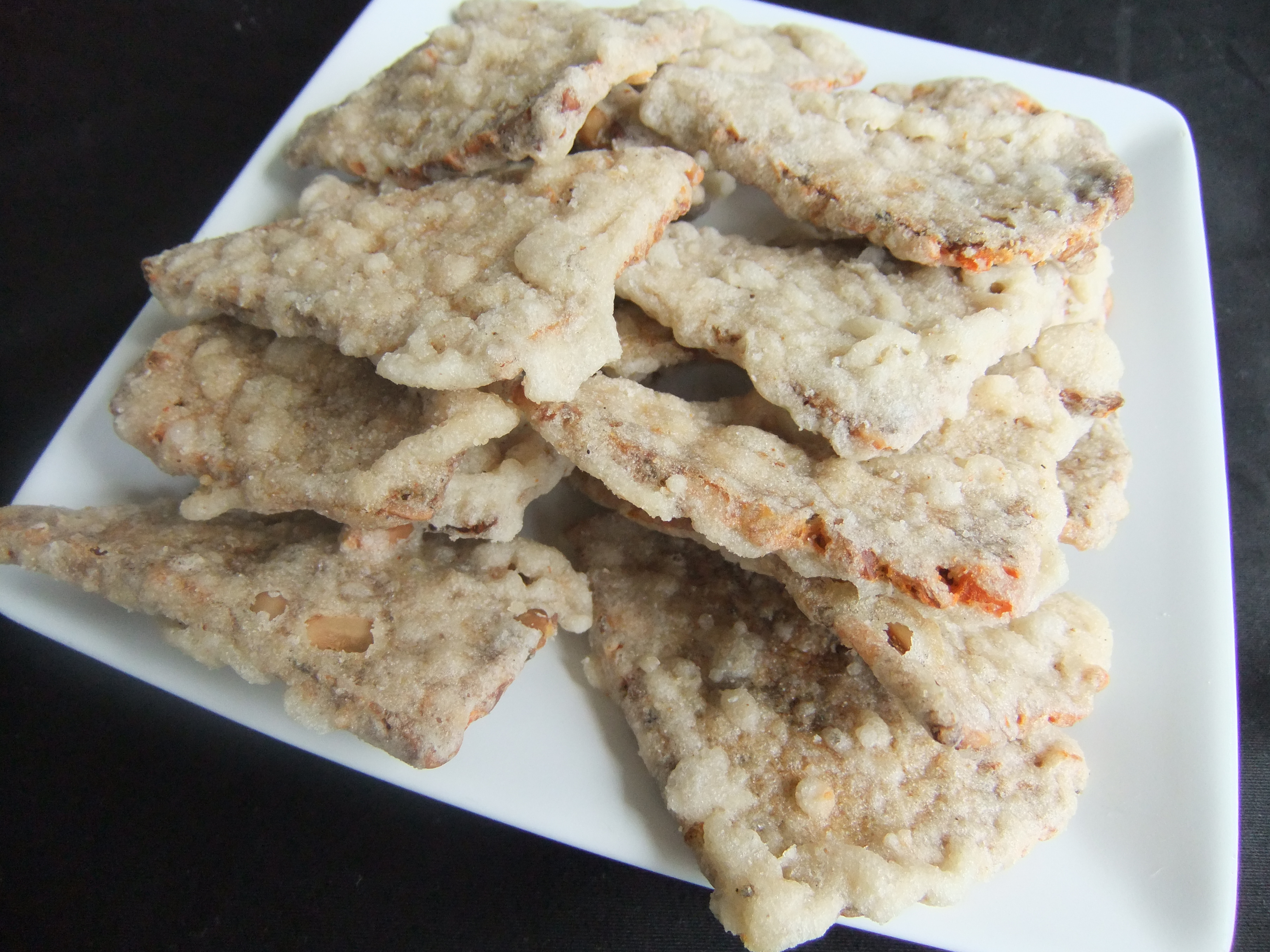
Oncom kripik

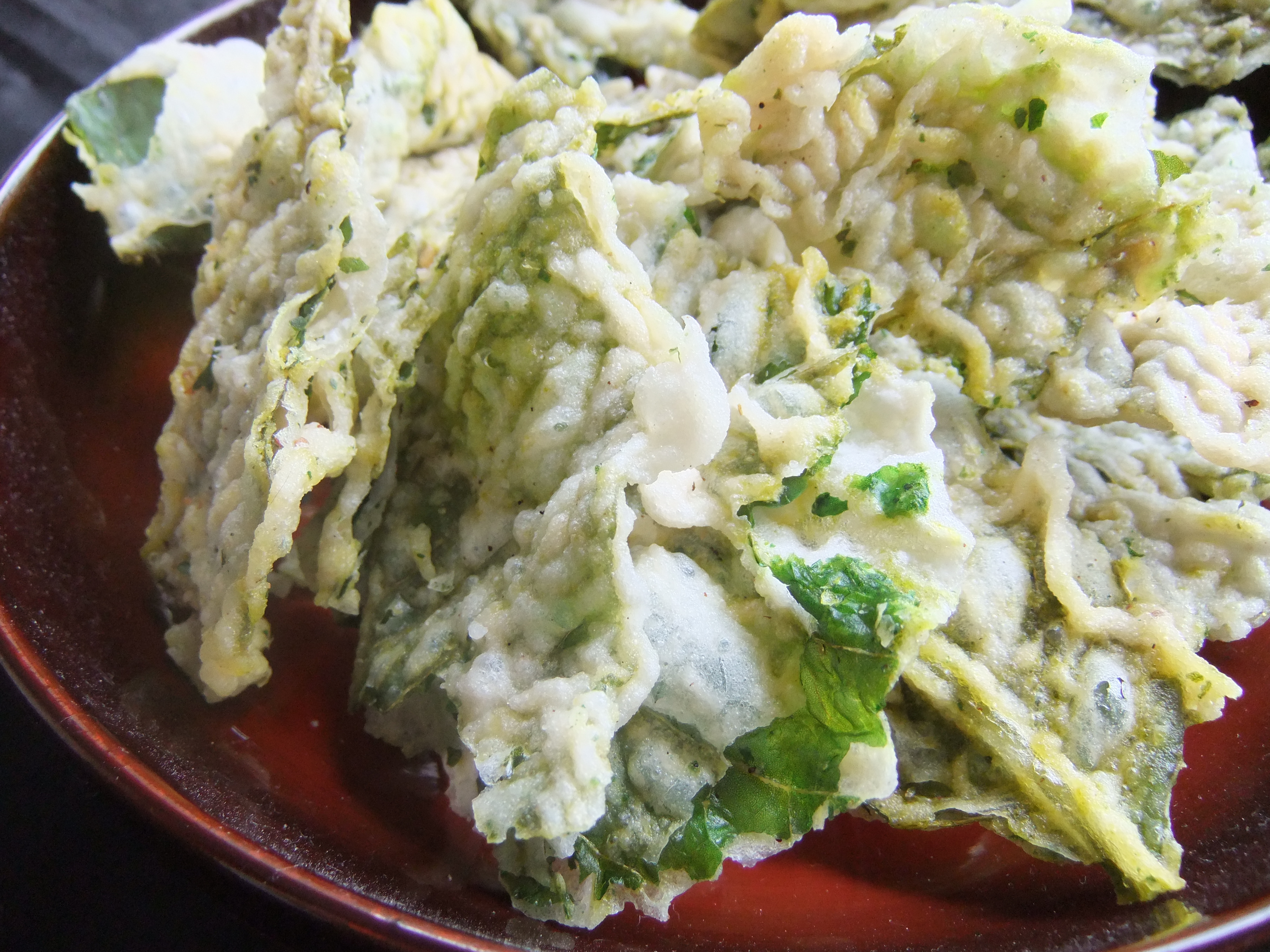
Spinach kripik

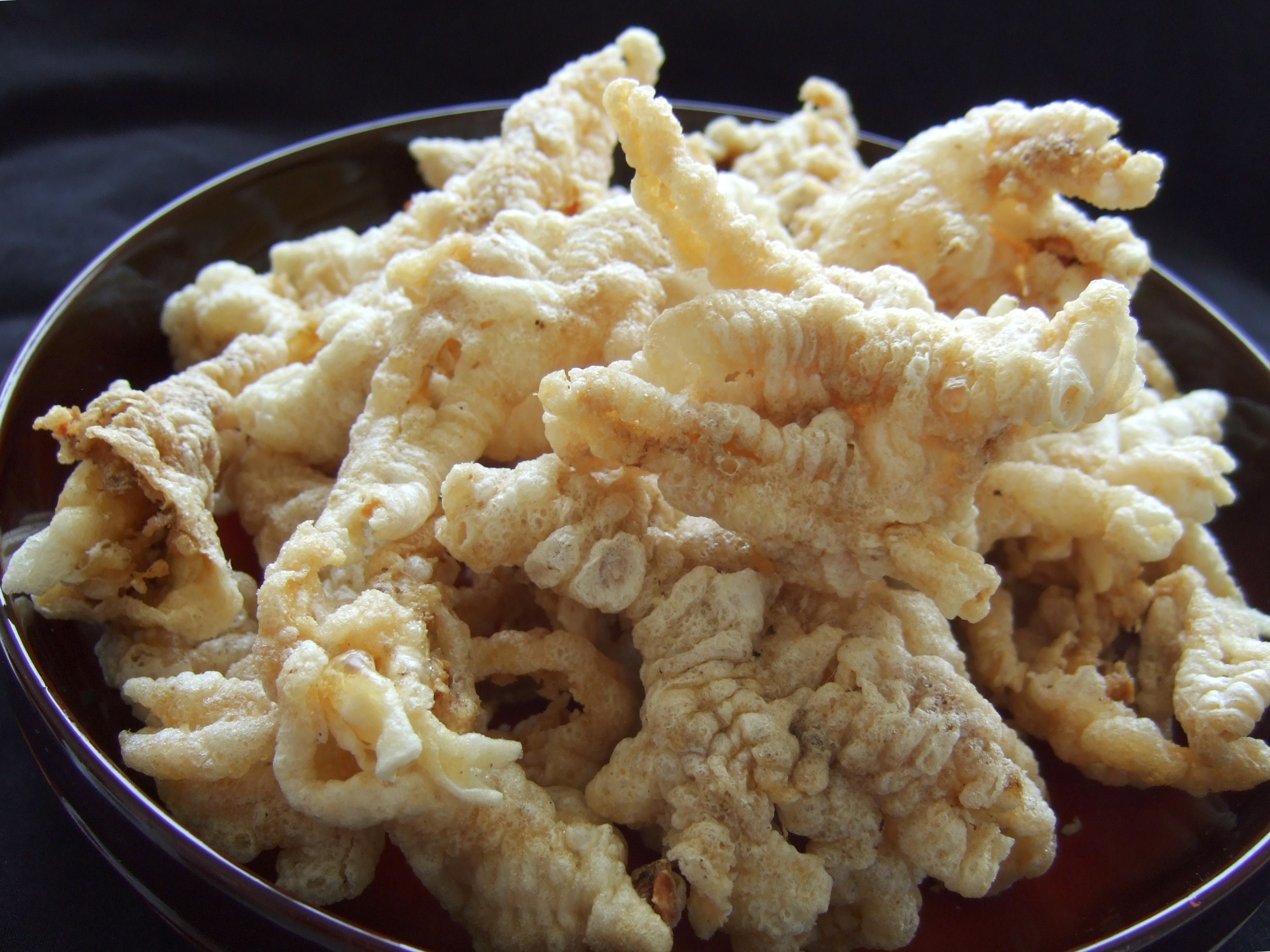
Chicken feet kripik

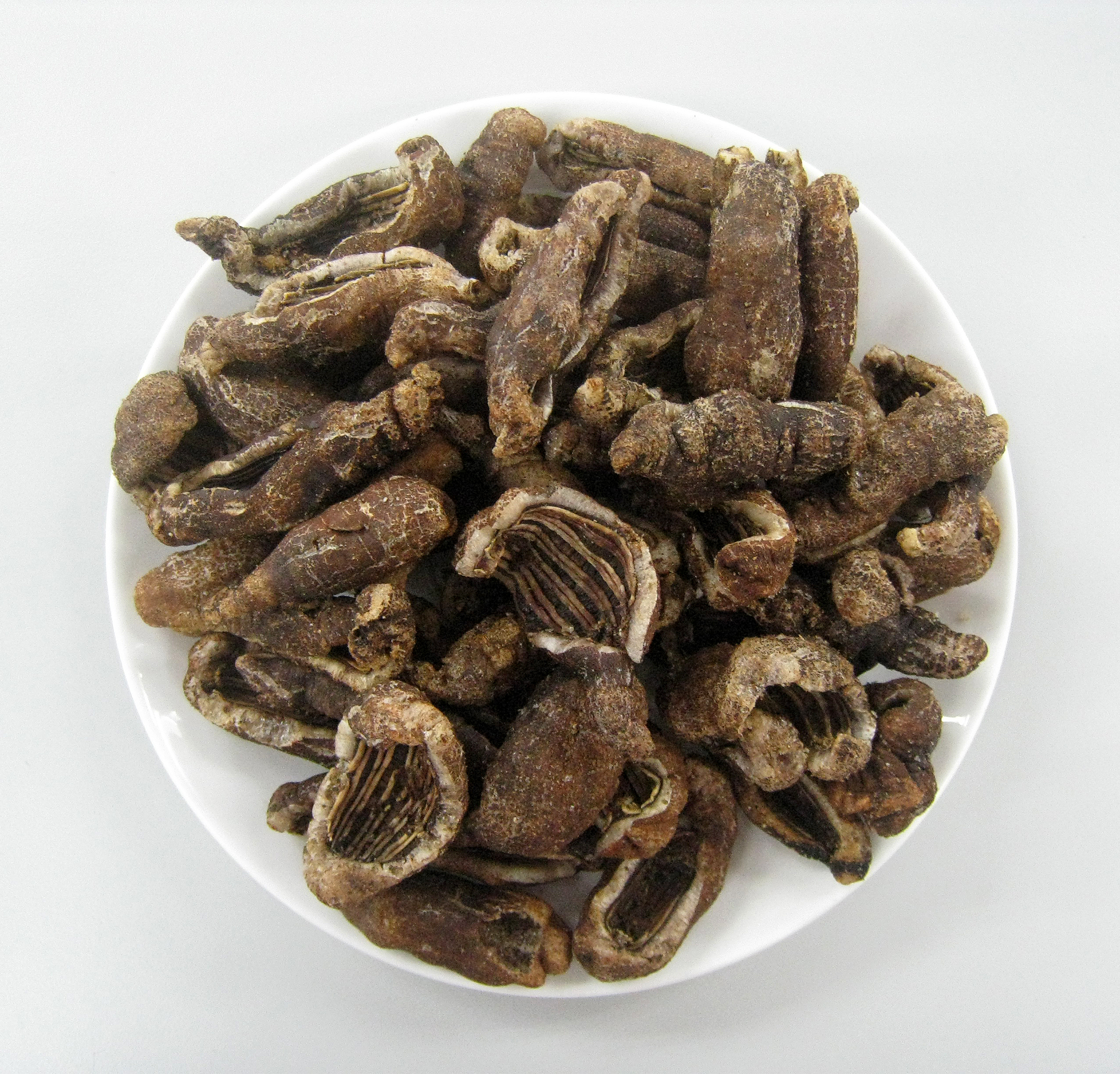
Keripik teripang, sea cucumber kripik

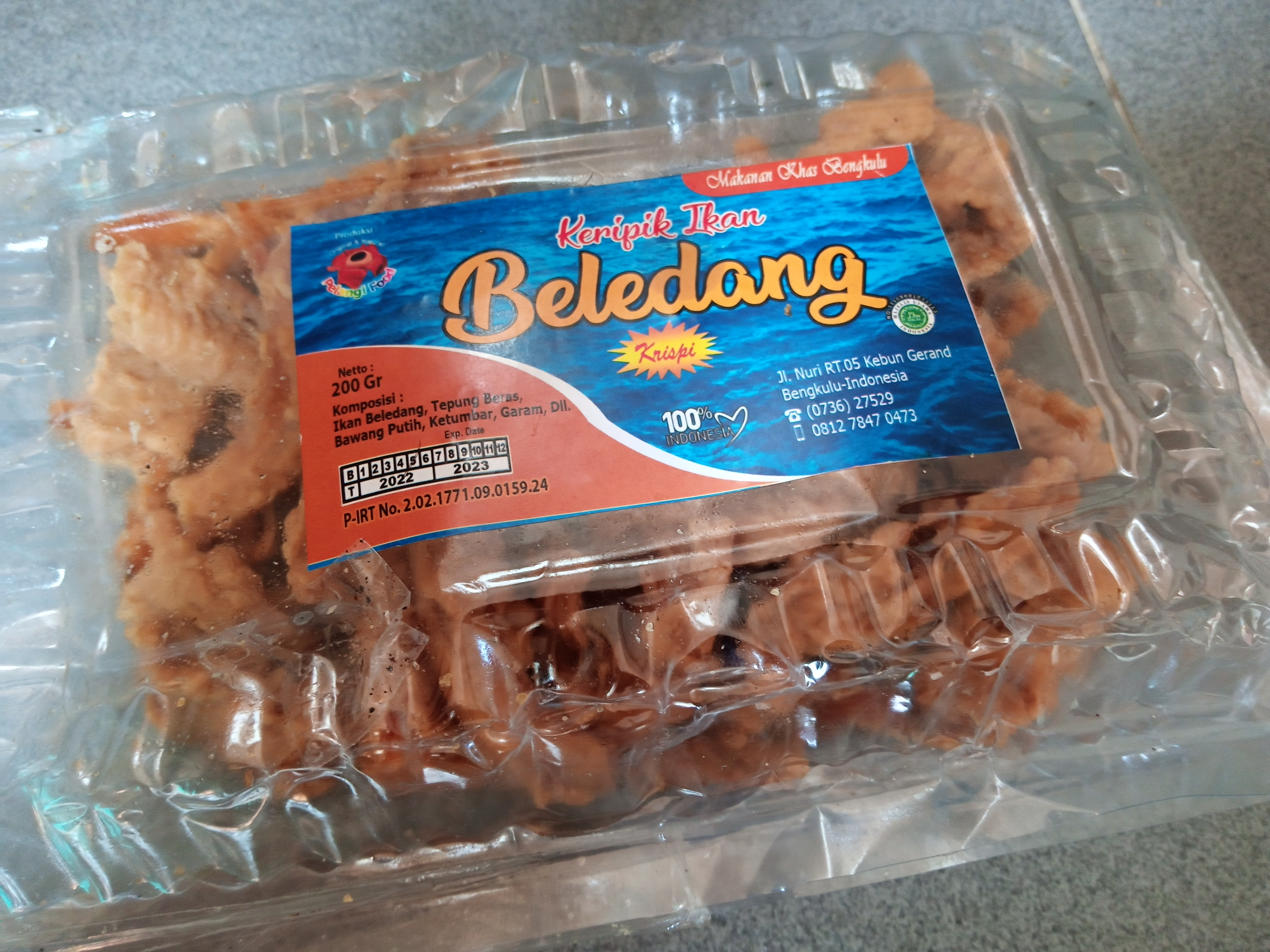
Largehead hairtail fish kripik

== See also ==
- Kabkab
- Kiping
- Banana chips
- Potato chips
- Tempura
