= Tapioca chips =

Deep fried thin slice of cassava root

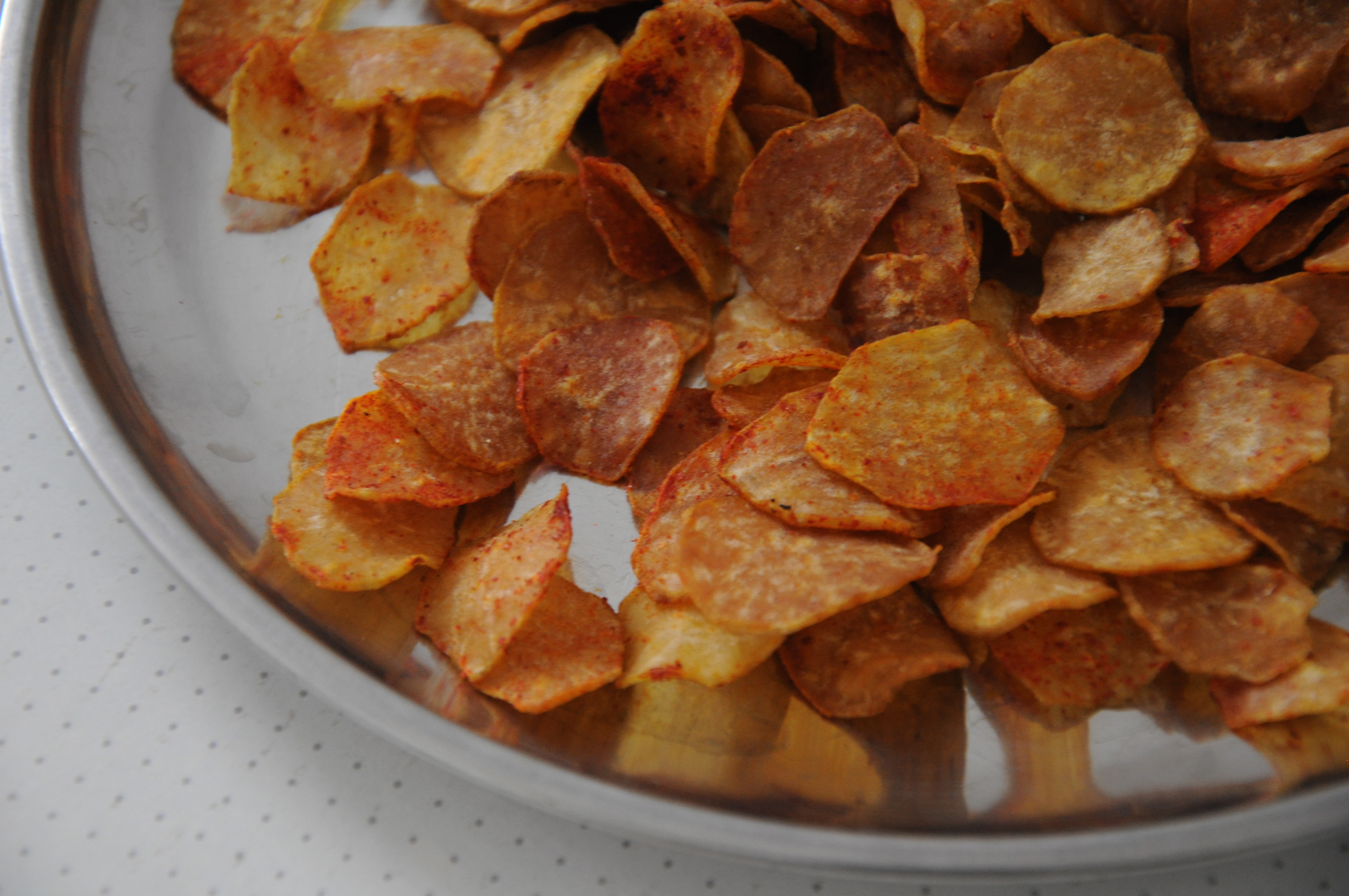
A close-up view of seasoned tapioca chips

Tapioca chips are a snack food made from thin wafers of deep-fried cassava root. It is commonly found in South India, and Sri Lanka, as well as in Indonesia where it is known as kripik singkong (cassava chips), and in Malaysia known as kerepek ubi.

It is also a bulk commodity product that is produced and traded, and in this form is used to create products such as alcohol, animal feed, biofuel, and starch.

== Overview ==
The dish is prepared using raw cassava tubers, whereby the inner rind and outer skin are removed. The chips are then fried or deep-fried in coconut oil, salted, and often spiced with red chili powder.

Tapioca chips have a longer shelf life compared to raw cassava tubers. The snack is sometimes purveyed and consumed as a street food.

Some companies mass-produce and purvey prepared tapioca chips that are packaged in bags.

== Variations ==
=== India and Sri Lanka ===
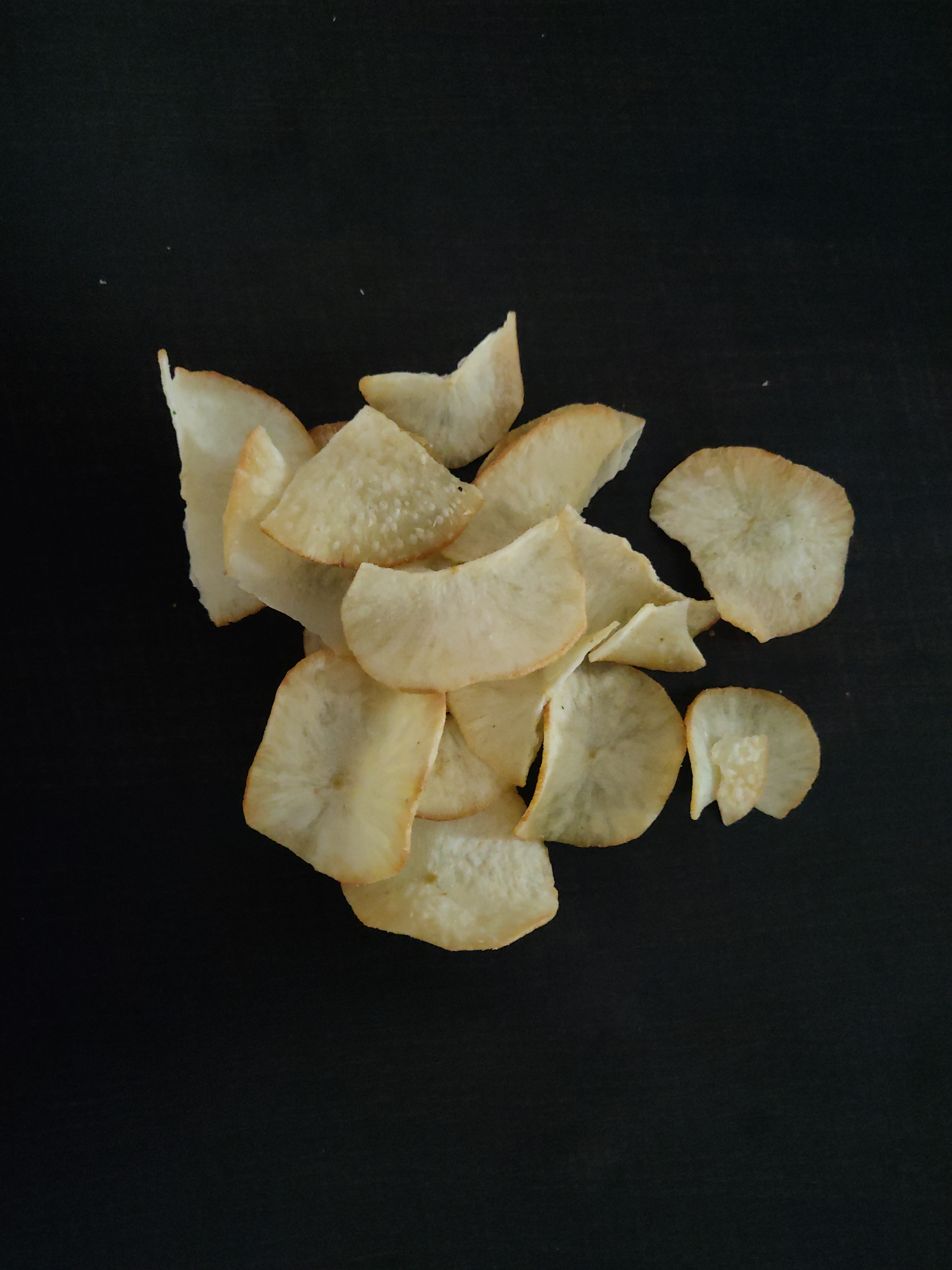
Plain tapioca chips from Kerala

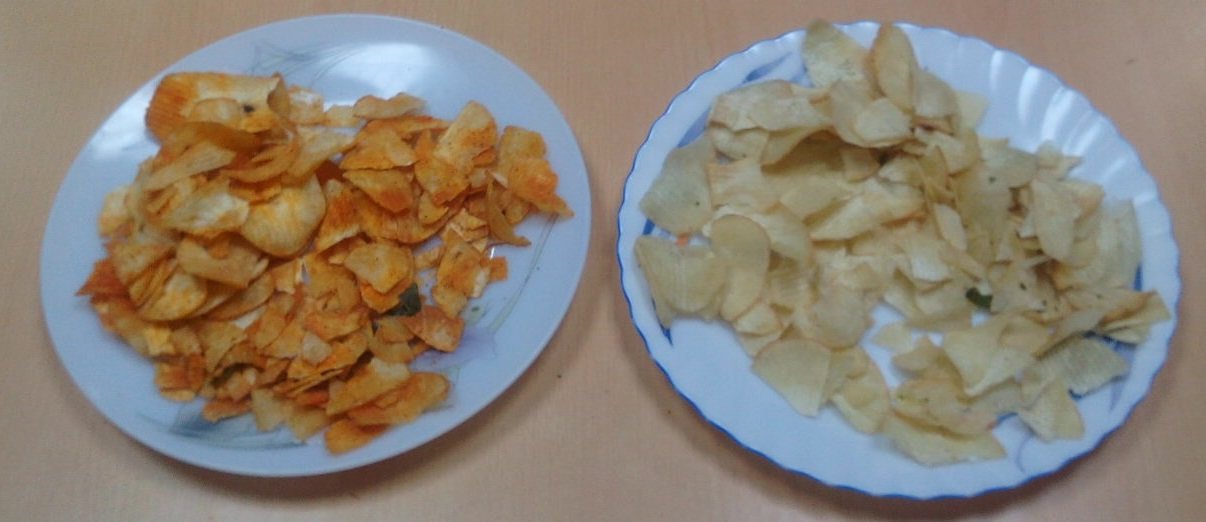
Spiced and plain tapioca chips

The snack is widely available in Tamil Nadu, Kerala, Karnataka, and Sri Lanka. High in carbohydrates, it is a crunchy and flavorful snack food, and the chips are crunchier compared to banana chips and potato chips. Common variants include the non-spicy and spicy (red chili pepper powder and other spices added).

=== Indonesia ===
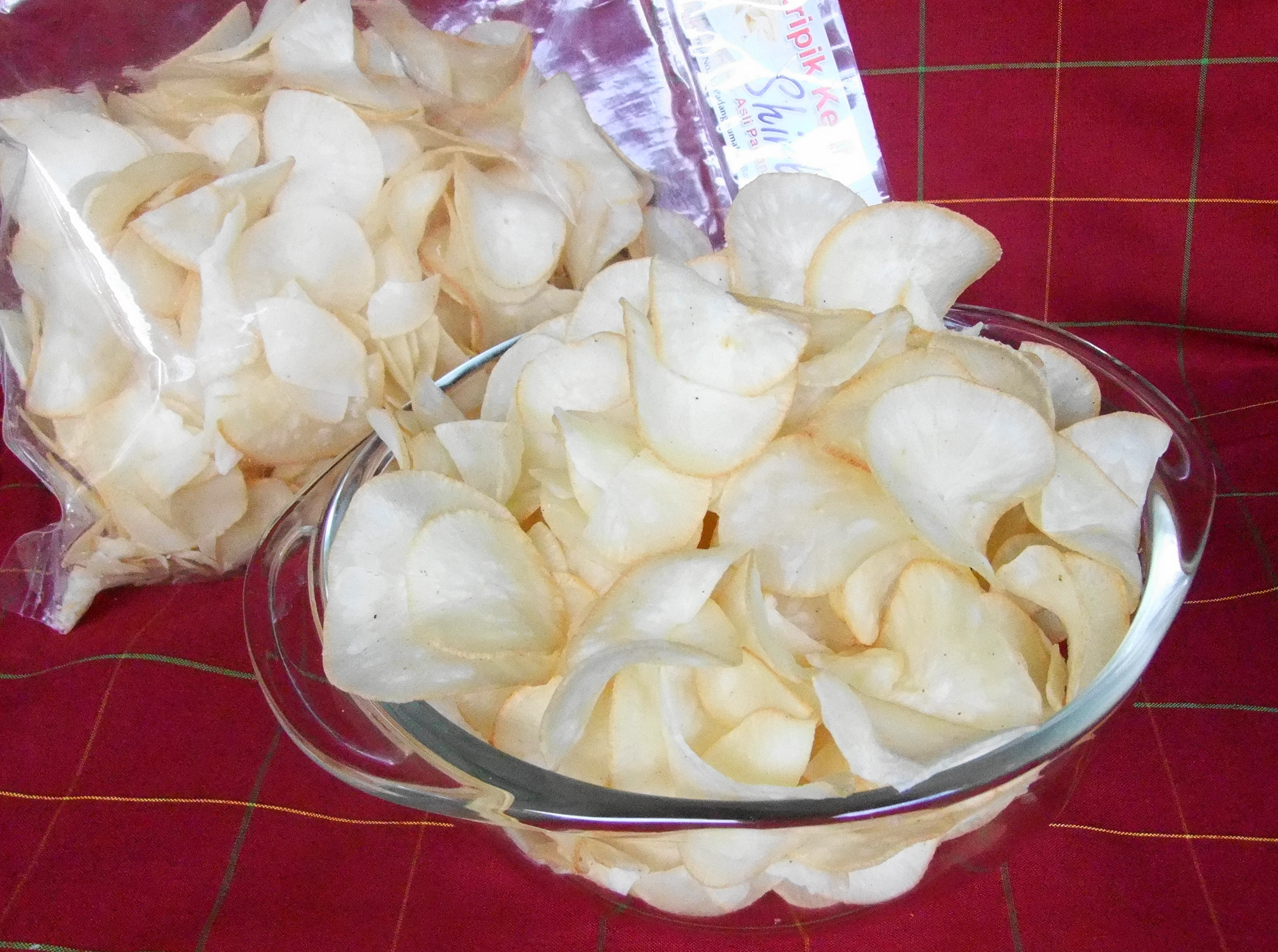
Indonesian kripik singkong (cassava chips)

Thinly sliced cassava is deep fried to be made as kripik singkong crackers (cassava chips or tapioca chips). Next to potato chips, cassava chips are a popular snack in Indonesia and are often spiced with various flavors. Some are mass-produced and purveyed under various brand names in stores and supermarkets.

A variant of hot and spicy kripik singkong coated with sugar and chili pepper is known as kripik balado or keripik sanjai, a specialty of Bukittinggi city in West Sumatra.

== Commercial tapioca chips ==
Tapioca chips and pellets are also produced, sold, and traded in bulk as a commodity, and are used to make starch, alcohol, and biofuel. The product is also used as animal feed in Kerala and Chennai, India, and for this purpose, processing typically involves only the removal of the outer skin of the tubers. Commercial varieties typically consist of the sliced and dried cassava tuber and are not fried in oil.

== See also ==
- Banana chips
- Cassava-based dishes
- List of deep fried foods
- List of street foods
- Tapioca
- Vegetable chips
