= Keripik sanjai =

Indonesian chips

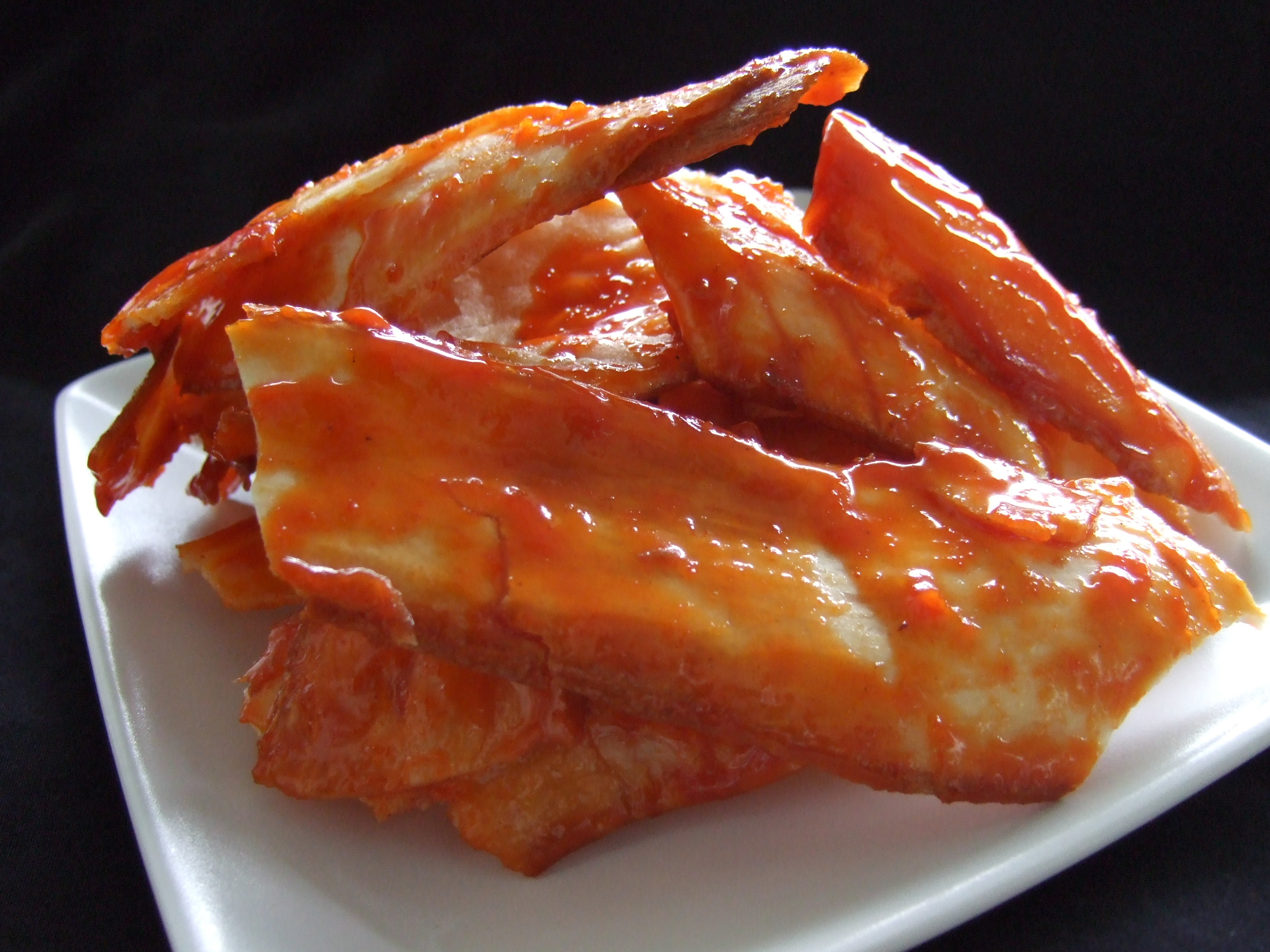
- Keripik sanjai balado (cassava), kripik in hot and sweet balado
- Alternative names: Keripik sanjay
- Course: Snack
- Place of origin: Indonesia
- Region or state: Bukittinggi, West Sumatra
- Created by: Minangkabaus
- Serving temperature: Room temperature
- Main ingredients: Deep fried dried cassava chips coated with sugar and chili pepper paste

Keripik sanjai or keripik sanjay (Jawi: كاروڤواق سنجاي; Minangkabau: karupuak sanjai) is a Minangkabau cassava kripik or chips from Bukittinggi city in West Sumatra, Indonesia. It is made from thinly sliced cassava deep fried in ample of coconut oil until crispy. It is commonly called keripik singkong in Indonesia, but this Minang version is probably the most popular of keripik singkong in Indonesia. And yet, the sweet, hot and spicy keripik sanjai balado is also the most famous variant of keripik sanjai.

There are three types of kripik sanjai:

1. Keripik sanjai tawar is a plain variant that only add salt for flavour
2. Keripik sanjai saka is sweet tasting variant coated with palm sugar.
3. Keripik sanjai balado, coated with balado bumbu made from the mixture of ground palm sugar and red chili pepper paste, it is the most famous variant.

== See also ==
- Balado
- Banana chips
- Potato chips
- List of deep fried foods
