= Balado (food) =

Indonesian spice mixture

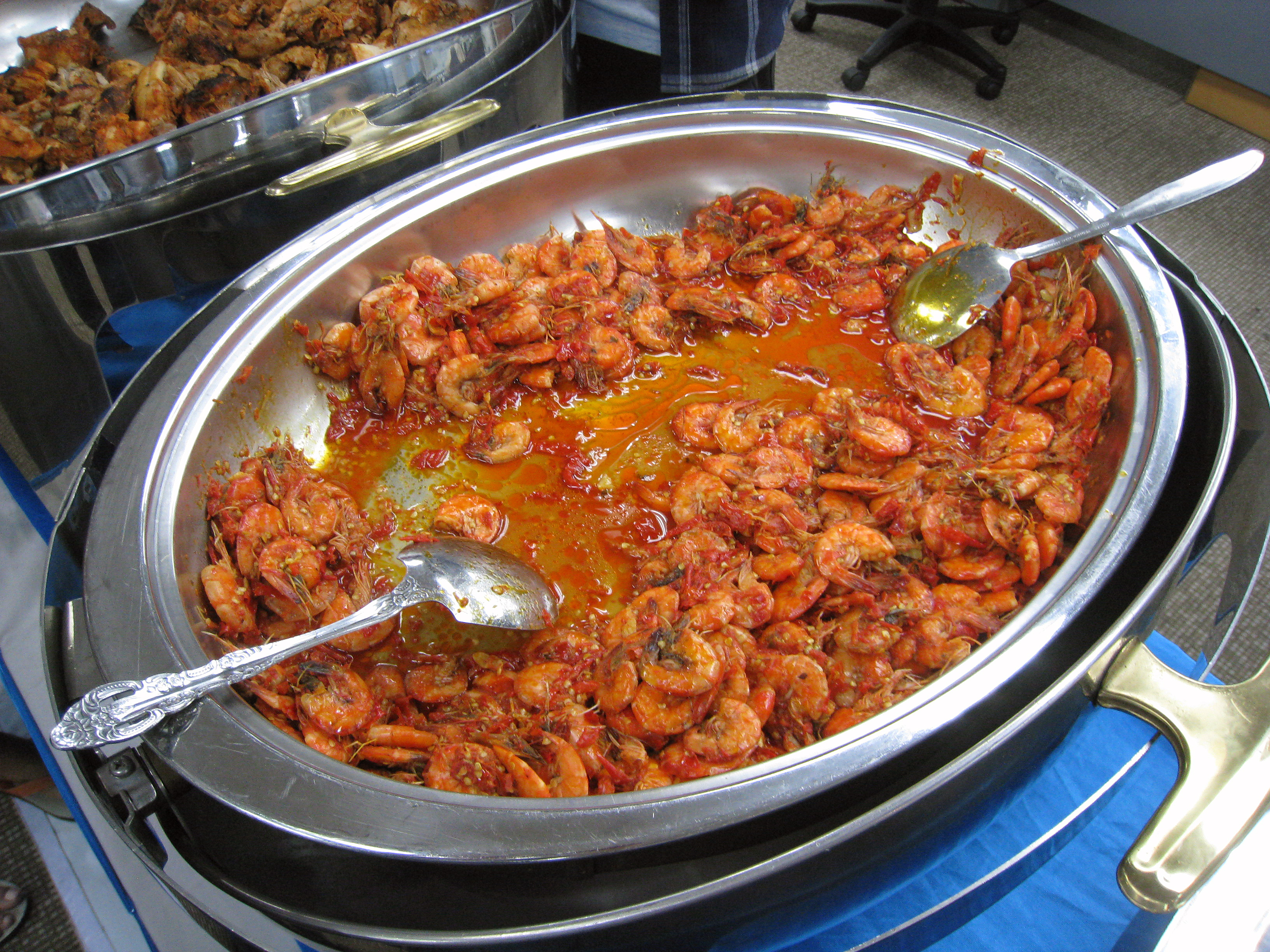
- Udang balado prawns in spicy balado sauce
- Alternative names: Sambal goreng, sambal lado
- Course: Main course
- Place of origin: Indonesia
- Region or state: West Sumatra
- Serving temperature: Hot
- Main ingredients: Egg, chicken, meat, or seafood in hot and spicy spice mixture with a large amount of red chili pepper

Balado is a type of hot and spicy bumbu (spice mixture) found in Minang cuisine of West Sumatra, Indonesia. It has since spread through the rest of Indonesia and also Malaysia especially in Negeri Sembilan. Balado sauce is made by stir frying ground red hot chili pepper with other spices including garlic, shallot, tomato and kaffir lime (leaves, fruit, or both) in coconut or palm oil.

The ingredients are quite similar to sambal hot chili paste. However, unlike sambal, which is often treated as a separate dipping condiment, balado chili sauce is usually mixed and stir fried together with its main ingredients and treated as a dish. Balado is suitable to be served with various types of seafood, such as fried prawns, squid, fish (whole or cutlets), as well as other ingredients, such as chicken, fried boiled eggs, fried beef, eggplant, and potatoes.

Because of its almost identical ingredients and technique, the term balado is often interchangeable with sambal goreng (lit.: "fried sambal"). Nevertheless, the term balado is more specifically referring to Minang cooking tradition, while sambal goreng refers to a more general Indonesian cuisine tradition.

== Variants ==
In the Minang dialect, the term balado literally means "with chili" or "in chili", since lado means "chili pepper" in the Minang dialect (compared with the Indonesian word "berlada"). Dish names usually combine the main ingredient followed with "balado", for example:

- Ayam balado (chicken balado)
- Bada balado (anchovies balado)
- Baluik balado or belut balado (eel balado)
- Cumi balado (squid balado)
- Dendeng balado (dendeng balado, thinly sliced dry fried beef)
- Kantang balado or kentang balado (potato balado)
- Talua balado or telur balado (egg balado)
- Taruang balado (eggplant balado)
- Teri Kacang Balado or Peanuts Anchovy Balado.
- Tuna balado (tuna balado)
- Udang balado (prawn/shrimp balado)
- Sambalado or sambal balado (balado as sambal condiment), precooked and chilled balado sauce to be used in cooking later.

== Gallery ==
Balado variants

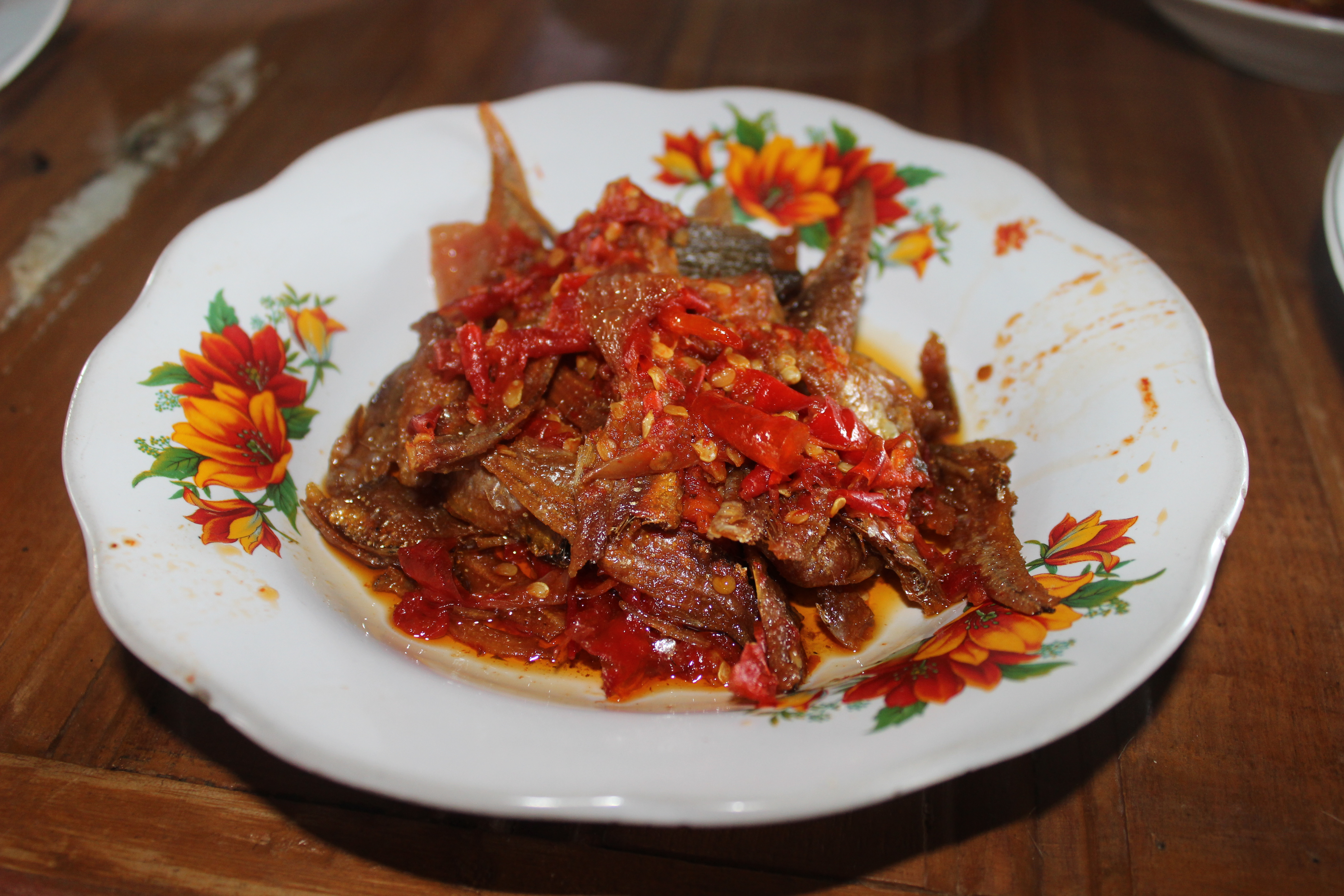
Bada (anchovy) balado

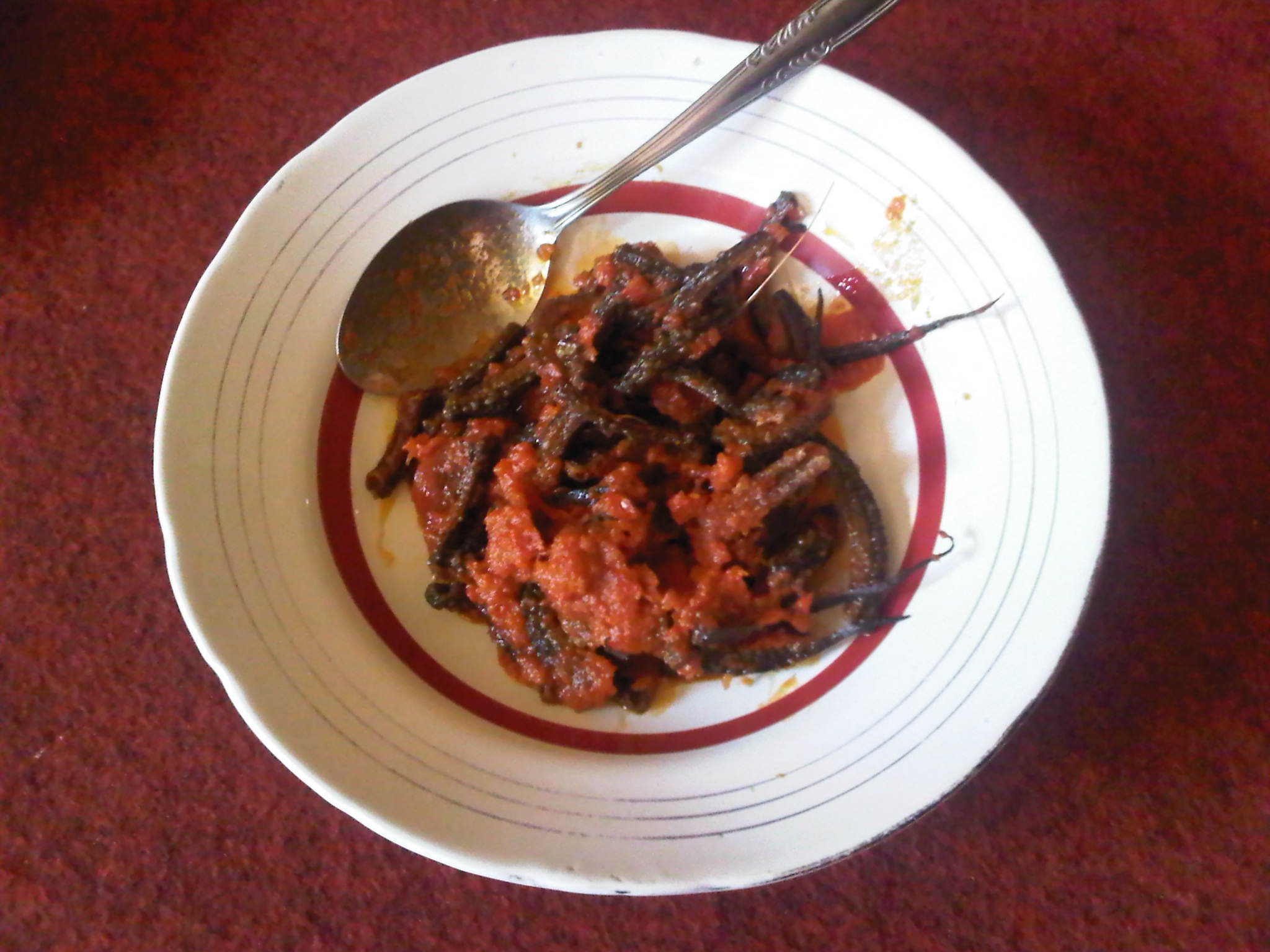
Baluik (eel) balado

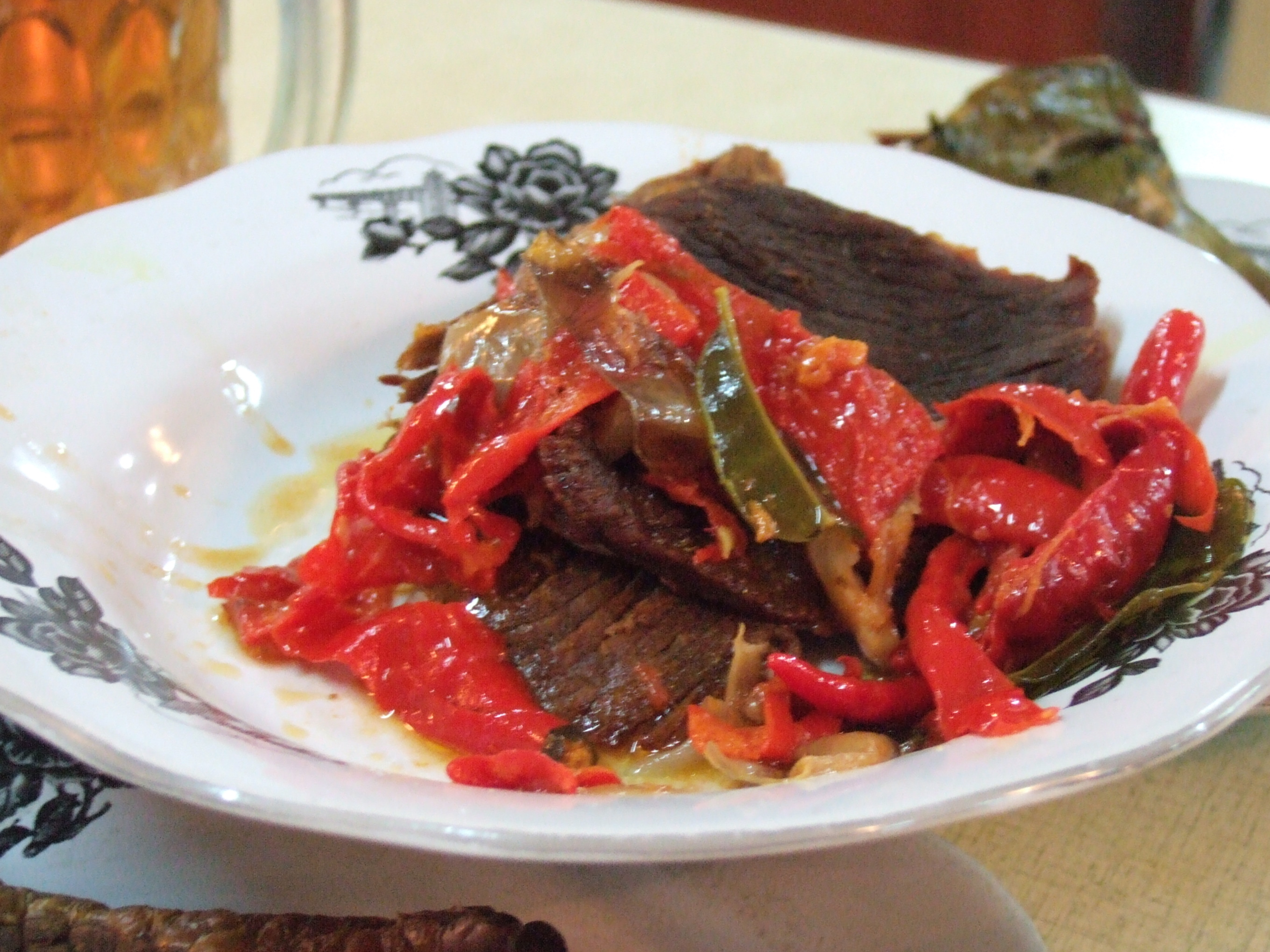
Dendeng (dried beef) balado

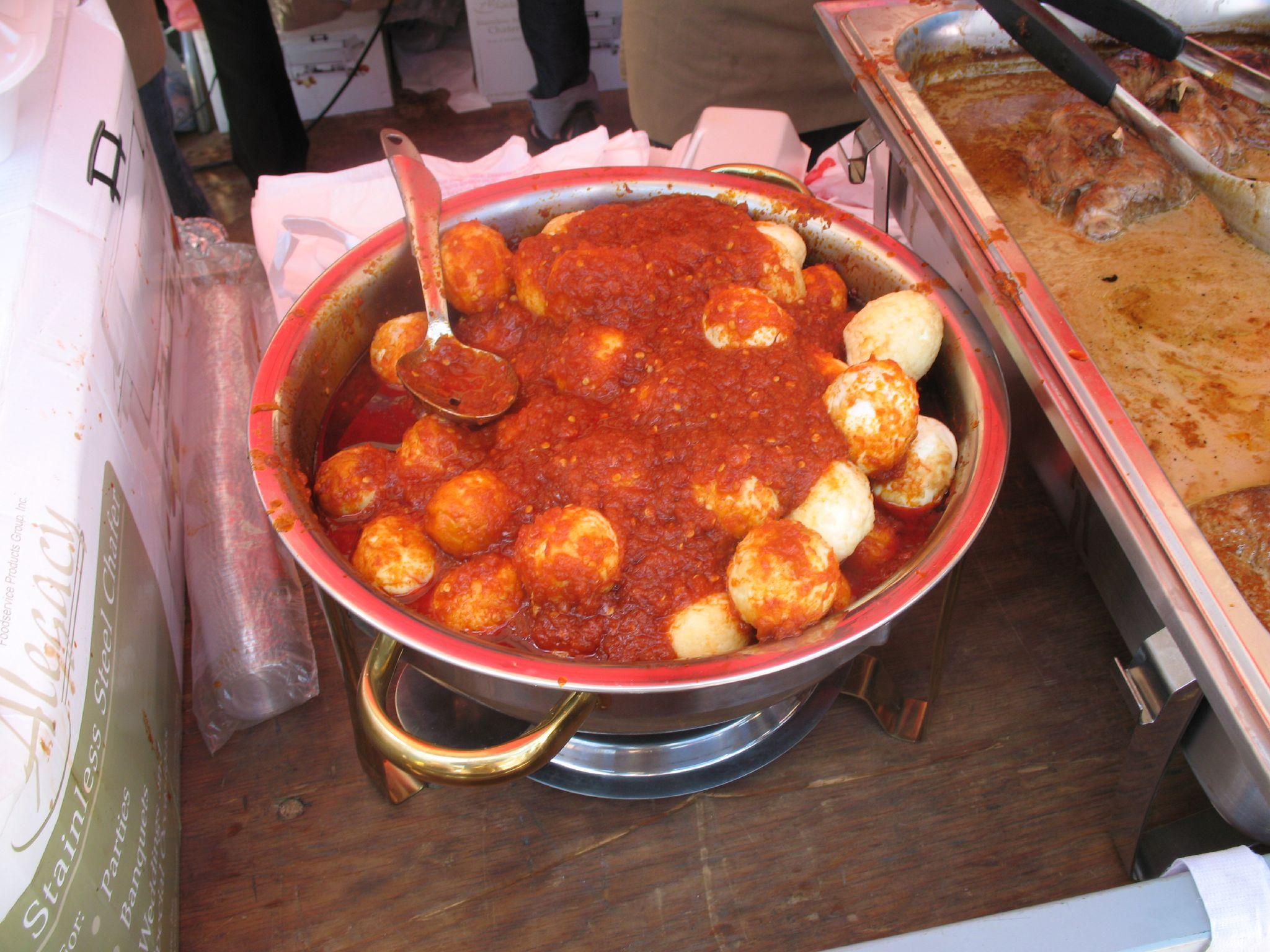
Talua (egg) balado

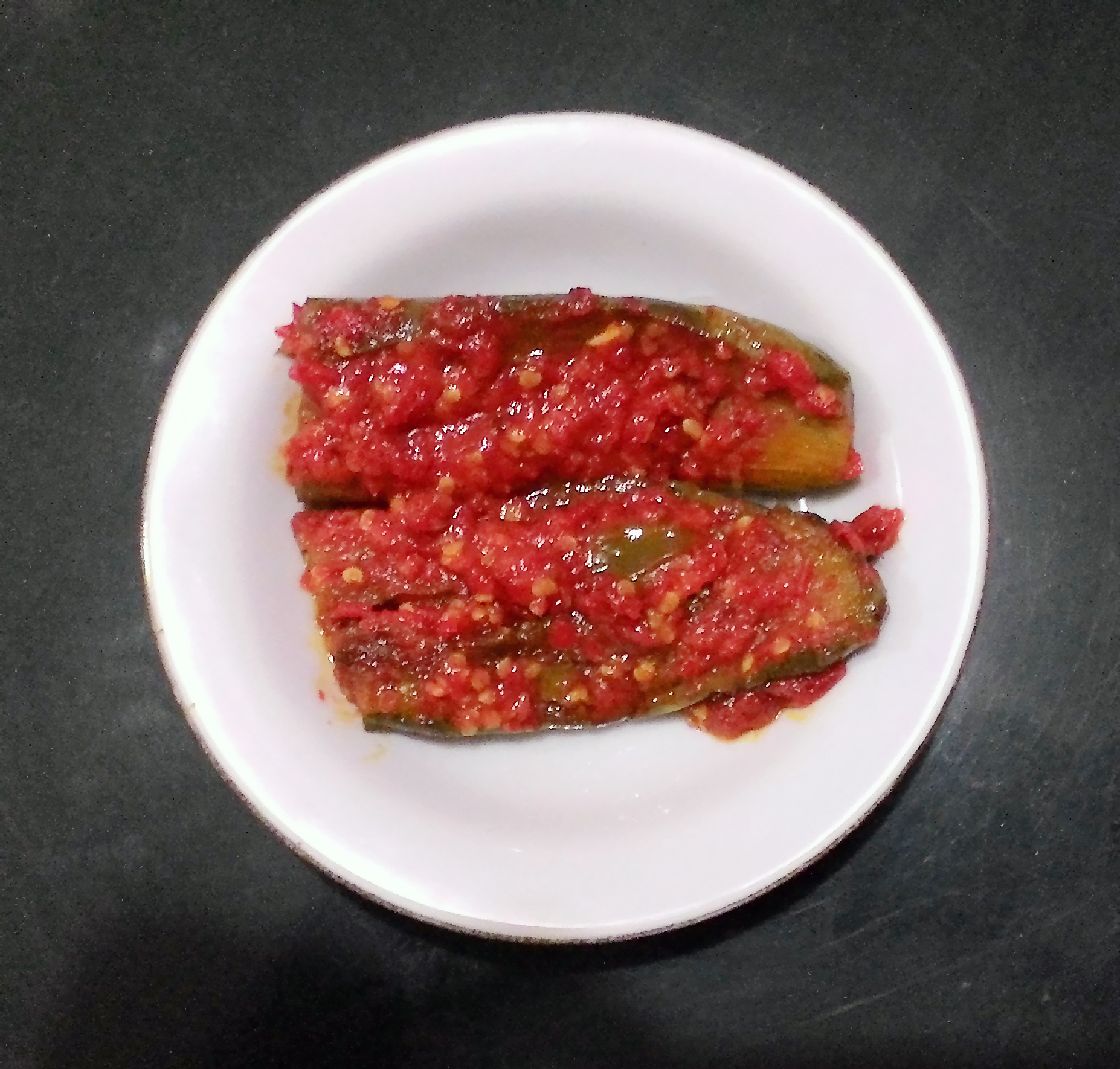
Taruang (eggplant) balado

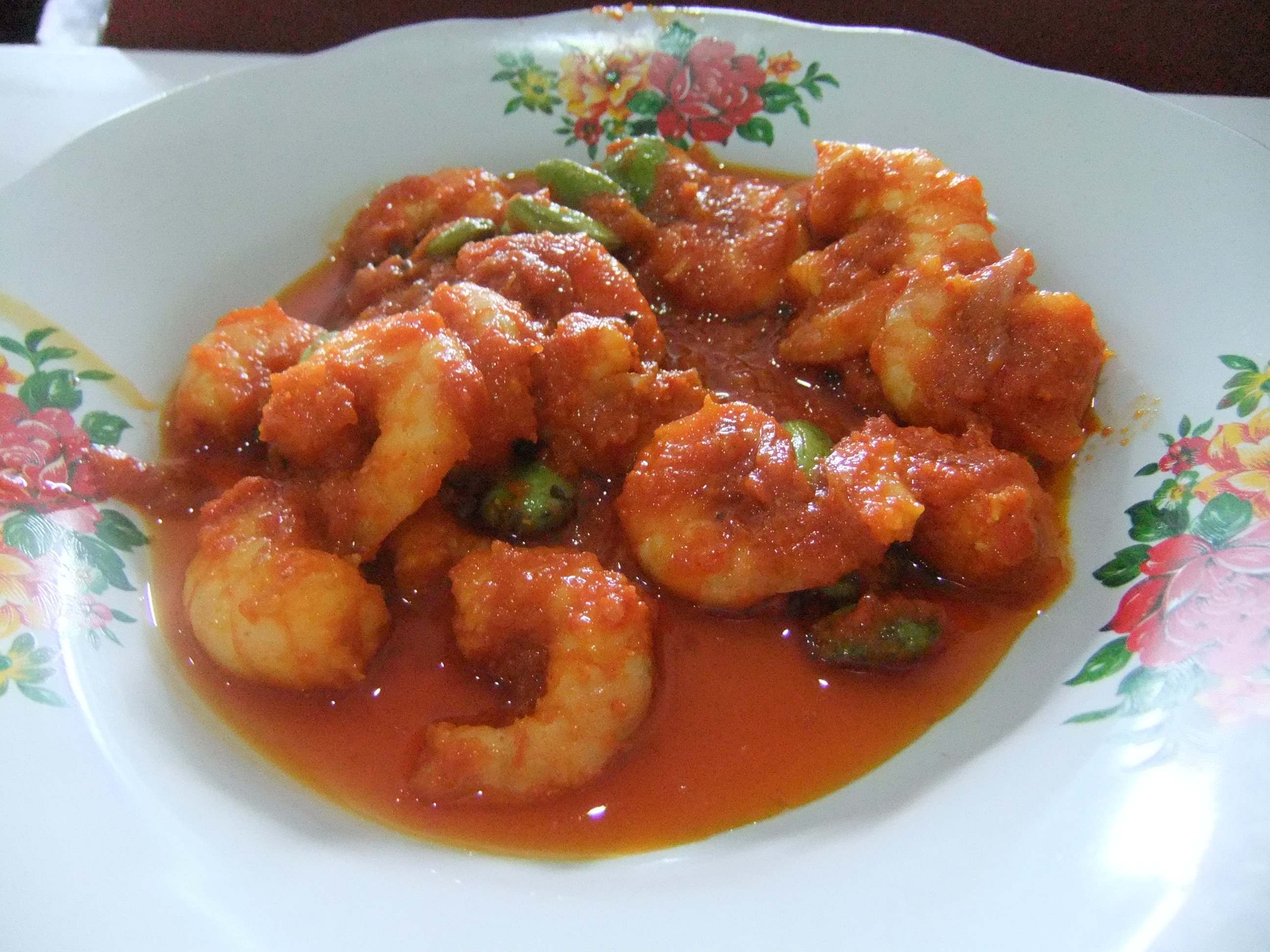
Udang (prawn) balado

== In popular culture ==
Hot and spicy balado has become an inspiration for a popular dangdut song, "Sambalado", sung by Ayu Tingting.

== See also ==
- Cuisine of Indonesia
- Sambal
- Rica-rica
- Dabu-dabu
